= Delaware Route 1 =

Highway in Delaware

Delaware Route 1
- DE 1 highlighted in red; DE 1A highlighted in yellow; DE 1B highlighted in teal; DE 1D highlighted in blue; DE 1 Bus. highlighted in green

Route information
- Maintained by DelDOT and USACE
- Length: 102.63 mi (165.17 km)
- Existed: 1974–present
- History: Completed in 2003
- Tourist routes: Delaware Bayshore Byway; Washington–Rochambeau Revolutionary Route

Major junctions
- South end: MD 528 in Fenwick Island
- US 9 / DE 404 in Nassau; US 113 in Milford; DE 9 near Dover AFB; US 13 in Dover; US 13 / DE 896 in Boyds Corner; US 301 Toll in Biddles Corner; US 13 in Tybouts Corner; US 40 in Bear; DE 273 near Christiana; DE 7 in Christiana
- North end: I-95 / DE 7 in Christiana

Location
- Country: United States
- State: Delaware
- Counties: Sussex, Kent, New Castle

Highway system
- Delaware State Route System; List; Byways
← DE 896	→ DE 1A

Delaware Route 1 (DE 1) is the longest numbered state highway in the U.S. state of Delaware. The route runs 102.63 mi (165.17 km) from the Maryland state line in Fenwick Island, Sussex County, where the road continues south into that state as Maryland Route 528 (MD 528), north to an interchange with Interstate 95 (I-95) in Christiana, New Castle County, where the roadway continues north as part of DE 7. Between Fenwick Island and Dover Air Force Base in Dover, Kent County, DE 1 is a multilane divided highway with at-grade intersections and occasional interchanges. The route heads north through the Delaware Beaches resort area along the Atlantic Ocean before it runs northwest through rural areas, turning north at Milford to continue to Dover. Upon reaching Dover, DE 1 becomes the Korean War Veterans Memorial Highway, a freeway that is partially tolled. Between Dover and Tybouts Corner, DE 1 parallels U.S. Route 13 (US 13), crossing over and featuring interchanges with it multiple times. Past Tybouts Corner, the freeway heads north parallel to DE 7 to the northern terminus of DE 1 in Christiana. DE 1 serves as the main north-south state highway in Delaware, connecting the Delaware Beaches with the Dover and Wilmington areas.

DE 1 was first designated in the 1970s from Fenwick Island north to US 113 in Milford, replacing a portion of DE 14 south of Milford and following the newly-constructed Milford Bypass. DE 14 between Fenwick Island and Milford had been built as a state highway in the 1920s and 1930s and was widened into a divided highway between the 1950s and 1970s. In the 1980s, a controlled-access "Relief Route" of US 13 was proposed between Dover and the Wilmington area in order to relieve that route of beach traffic. This proposed highway was incorporated into DE 1 in 1988, with the route extended north concurrent with US 113 between Milford and Dover to connect to the Relief Route. The DE 1 freeway between Dover Air Force Base and Christiana opened in multiple stages between 1991 and 2003, and at a cost of $900 million was the largest public works project in Delaware history. The concurrent US 113 designation between Milford and Dover Air Force Base was removed in 2004. Upgrades continue to be made to DE 1 such as the construction and improvement of interchanges as well as widening portions of the road.

== Route description ==
DE 1 begins at MD 528 at the Maryland state line in Fenwick Island, where it heads north along a multilane divided highway called Coastal Highway through the Delaware Beaches resort area along the Atlantic Ocean, crossing the Indian River Inlet on the Indian River Inlet Bridge. In Dewey Beach, the route turns northwest away from the ocean, running through commercial development from Rehoboth Beach to Nassau. DE 1 forms a concurrency with US 9 from Carpenters Corner to Nassau. Past Nassau, DE 1 leaves the Delaware Beaches resort area and runs northwest through rural areas in northern Sussex County. The route bypasses Milford to the east along the Milford Bypass, crossing into Kent County. After an interchange with the northern terminus of US 113, DE 1 heads north along Bay Road through more rural areas, passing east of Frederica. The route becomes a freeway near Magnolia and turns into a toll road called the Korean War Veterans Memorial Highway while passing Dover Air Force Base. DE 1 bypasses the city of Dover to the east and begins to run parallel to US 13. The route passes east of Smyrna and enters New Castle County, where it crosses US 13 multiple times and heads west of Odessa. The road has an interchange with the northern terminus of the US 301 toll road in Biddles Corner. The toll road portion of the route ends before it crosses the Chesapeake & Delaware Canal on the Senator William V. Roth Jr. Bridge in St. Georges. DE 1 becomes concurrent with US 13 from Wrangle Hill to Tybouts Corner, where US 13 splits to the northeast. The DE 1 freeway heads north and meets US 40 in Bear before it comes to Christiana, where DE 7 joins the route. The DE 1 designation ends at an interchange with I-95 and DE 7 continues north along the freeway to the DE 58 interchange, from which point DE 7 turns into a divided highway with at-grade intersections.

DE 1 serves as a major route connecting northern Delaware to the Delaware Beaches and sees heavy traffic in the summer months. The peak travel periods in the summer are southbound on Friday evenings, both directions on Saturday afternoons, and northbound on Sunday afternoons. DE 1 serves as a primary hurricane evacuation route from the Delaware Beaches and points along the Delaware Bay to inland locations in northern Delaware. The sections of DE 1 between DE 12 near Frederica and Clapham Road in Little Heaven and between Trap Shooters Road near Magnolia and DE 9 near Dover Air Force Base are designated as part of the Delaware Bayshore Byway, a Delaware Byway and National Scenic Byway. The section of DE 1 between the south end of the DE 7 concurrency and the northern terminus at I-95 in Christiana is part of the Washington–Rochambeau Revolutionary Route, a National Historic Trail. DE 1 has an annual average daily traffic count ranging from a high of 116,110 vehicles at the US 13 interchange north of Smyrna to a low of 10,590 vehicles at the southern boundary of South Bethany. The entire length of DE 1 is part of the National Highway System, a network of roads important to the country's economy, defense, and mobility.

=== Fenwick Island to Nassau ===
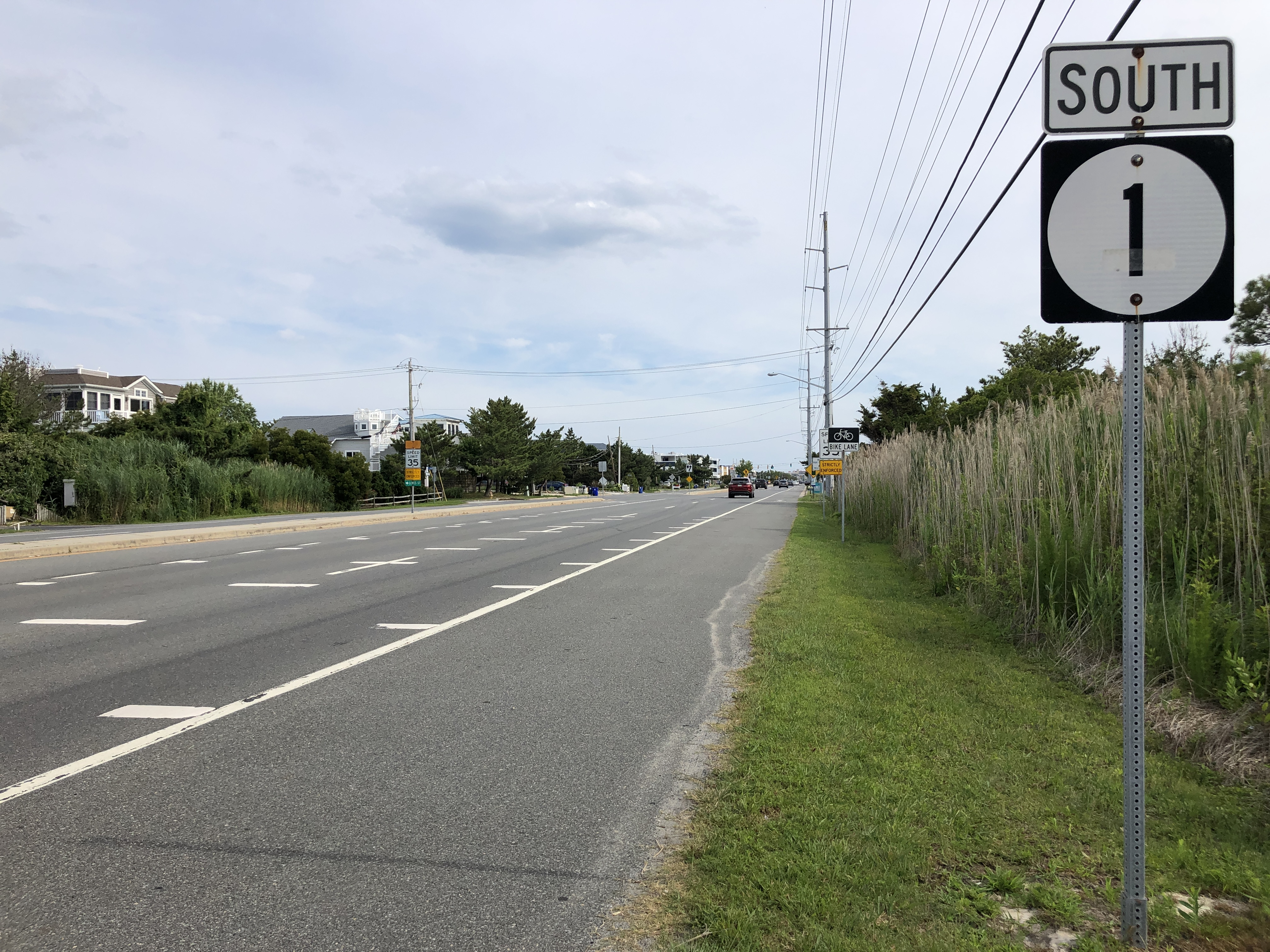
DE 1 southbound entering Fenwick Island

DE 1 begins at the Maryland state line south of the Delaware Beaches town of Fenwick Island in Sussex County, where the road continues south into the town of Ocean City, Maryland, as MD 528. From this point, DE 1 heads north on Coastal Highway, a four-lane divided highway. A block after the state line, the route intersects the eastern terminus of DE 54. The road continues north into the town of Fenwick Island and heads through business areas with some residences a short distance to the west of the Atlantic Ocean. DE 1 passes west of the Bethany-Fenwick Area Chamber of Commerce Information Center as it leaves Fenwick Island and enters Fenwick Island State Park, running along a narrow strip of land with the Little Assawoman Bay to the west and the Atlantic Ocean to the east. The route heads past a small area of residential development before it goes through more of the state park, running to the west of a fire control tower from World War II. The road runs through the community of York Beach and enters the town of South Bethany, where it passes through residential areas. DE 1 leaves South Bethany and heads into commercial areas in the community of Middlesex Beach, briefly curving northwest before turning north again. The route continues into the town of Bethany Beach, where the road name changes to Delaware Avenue. DE 1 runs past residences and comes to an intersection with DE 26, which heads east into the commercial center of Bethany Beach. The road curves northeast and leaves Bethany Beach as it passes to the east of a Delaware National Guard training site. Continuing north, DE 1 becomes Coastal Highway again and heads past the community of Sussex Shores, running between wooded areas to the west and beachfront homes to the east. Farther north, the route crosses into Delaware Seashore State Park, where it travels along a strip of land between the Indian River Bay to the west and the Atlantic Ocean to the east. DE 1 comes to a right-in/right-out access point to the South Inlet area of the park before it crosses over the Indian River Inlet on the Indian River Inlet Bridge, a cable-stayed bridge.

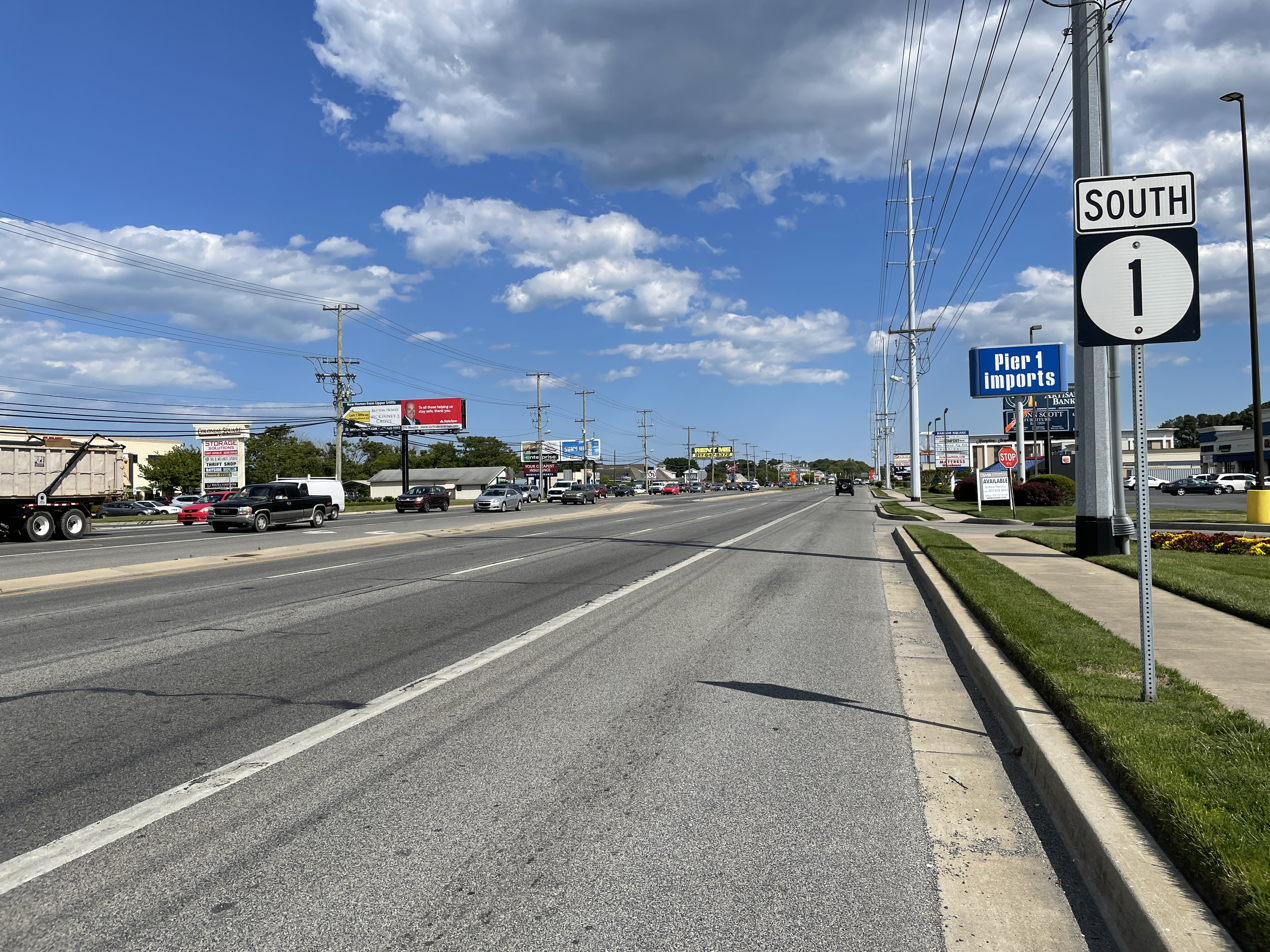
DE 1 southbound approaching DE 24/DE 1D in Midway

Past the bridge, the road passes to the east of United States Coast Guard Station Indian River Inlet and the North Inlet area of the park, continuing north through more of the state park between the Rehoboth Bay to the west and the Atlantic Ocean to the east. The route travels near the Indian River Life-Saving Station and two fire control towers from World War II before it leaves Delaware Seashore State Park and heads west of the residential community of Indian Beach prior to entering the town of Dewey Beach. At this point, DE 1 runs through business areas. The route comes to an intersection with the southern terminus of DE 1A, which heads north toward the city of Rehoboth Beach. At this intersection, DE 1 turns northwest away from the Atlantic Ocean and passes through residential areas with some commercial development. The road leaves Dewey Beach and continues to a right-in/right-out interchange with DE 1B, which heads north into Rehoboth Beach. Immediately after, the route crosses over the Lewes and Rehoboth Canal on a high-level, twin-span crossing and enters commercial areas. After the bridge, the road has a southbound ramp connecting to South Timberlake Trail and a northbound right-in/right-out serving Oyster House Road, which allows U-turns from the southbound direction to the northbound direction via South Timberlake Trail and Oyster House Road. At this point, the route gains a southbound combined right turn, bus, and bicycle lane.

DE 1 intersects the northern terminus of DE 1A, at which point it widens to eight lanes, with three travel lanes in each direction plus a combined right turn, bus, and bicycle lane in both directions. The road passes more businesses, with the Rehoboth Avenue Extension service road running parallel to the northbound lanes to the Shuttle Road/Sea Blossom Boulevard intersection. Shuttle Road heads south to the Rehoboth Beach Park and Ride, a park and ride facility serving DART First State buses. Following this, the roadway passes between two sections of the Tanger Outlets Rehoboth Beach outlet mall. Farther northwest, the route heads to the northeast of the Rehoboth Mall and comes to an intersection with the eastern terminus of DE 24 and the southern terminus of DE 1D in the community of Midway. DE 1 passes to the northeast of another section of the Tanger Outlets as it is lined with more businesses. In the community of Carpenters Corner, the route intersects US 9, which travels northeast to provide access to the city of Lewes, Cape Henlopen State Park, and the Cape May–Lewes Ferry across the Delaware Bay. At this point, DE 1 becomes concurrent with US 9, and the two routes run through woods before curving west past businesses and passing north of the Lewes Transit Center park and ride serving DART First State buses. At the Five Points intersection, US 9 splits from DE 1 by heading west concurrent with DE 404, with access to the northern termini of DE 23 and DE 1D, while US 9 Bus. heads northeast toward Lewes. At this intersection, access from eastbound US 9/DE 404 to northbound DE 1 is provided by a reverse jughandle. Past Five Points, DE 1 narrows back to four lanes and heads south of a park and pool lot located at a church before it bypasses the community of Nassau to the southwest, curving northwest to pass over the Georgetown-Lewes Trail on a bridge.

=== Nassau to Dover Air Force Base ===
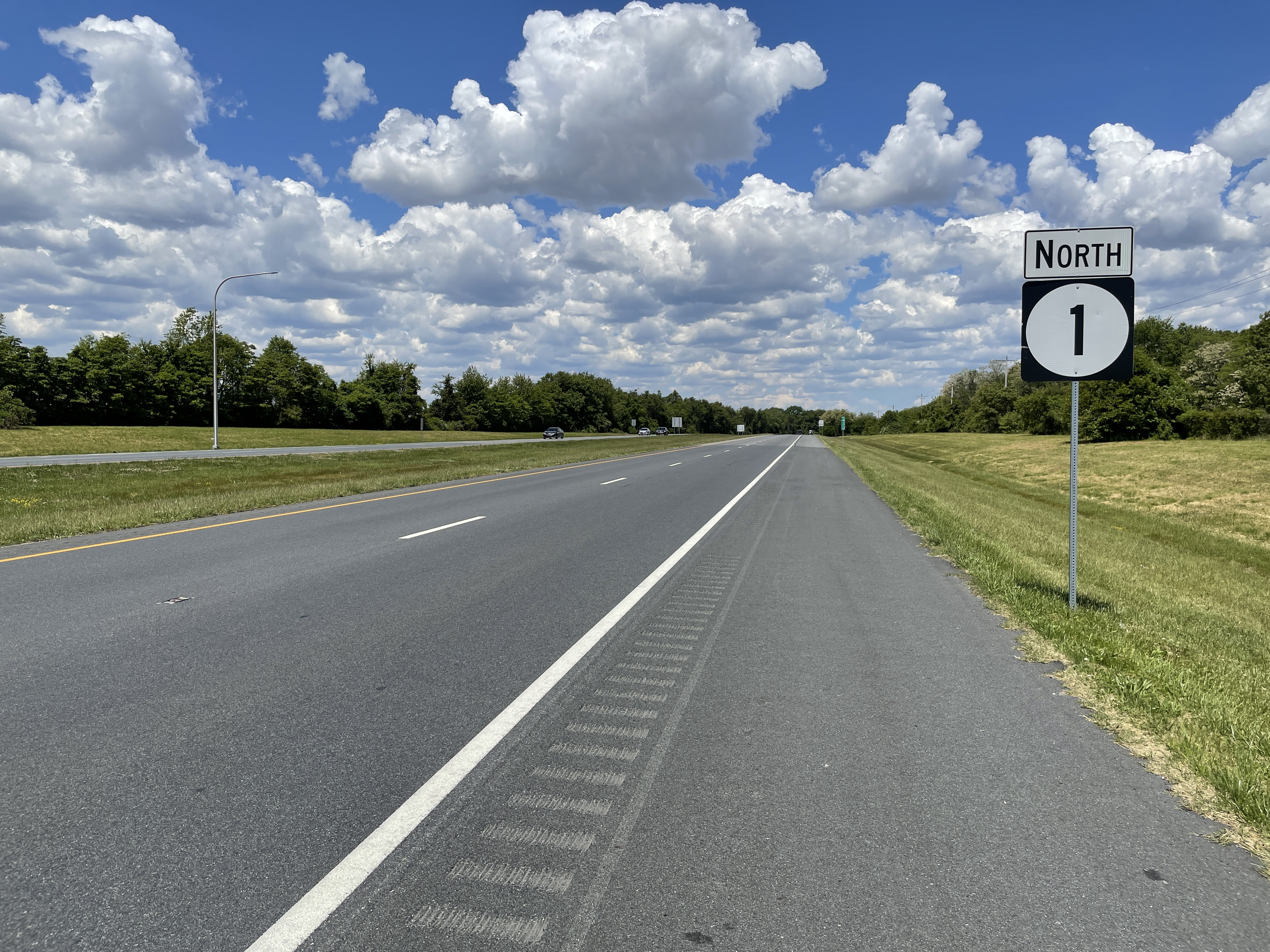
DE 1 northbound along the Milford Bypass in Milford

After the bridge over the trail, DE 1 leaves the Delaware Beaches resort area and heads into a mix of farm fields and residential and commercial development, coming to a junction with Minos Conaway Road and traveling to the northeast of Red Mill Pond. The road intersects Cave Neck Road in the community of Overbrook and passes northeast of Eagle Crest Aerodrome and the Hudson Fields event venue as it continues through more agricultural areas with some residential subdivisions and woods. The route crosses the Broadkill River and runs to the southwest of a golf course before it comes to a junction with DE 16, which heads west to the town of Milton and east to the community of Broadkill Beach along the Delaware Bay. This is the northernmost signalized intersection on DE 1. Following this, the highway continues through farmland and woodland to the southwest of the Prime Hook National Wildlife Refuge, reaching an intersection with the northern terminus of DE 5; this intersection has no access from northbound DE 1 to DE 5. Immediately after this intersection, the road travels across Waples Mill Pond along the Primehook Creek and runs north-northwest through more agricultural areas, crossing Slaughter Creek. The route curves northwest as it bypasses the community of Argos Corner to the southwest. Past here, DE 1 crosses Cedar Creek and passes near a couple residential subdivisions before intersecting Johnson Road. A short distance later, the road reaches an interchange connecting to DE 30 northeast of Bayhealth Hospital, Sussex Campus. After this interchange, the route comes to a northbound exit and southbound entrance with the southern terminus of DE 1 Bus., which heads northwest into the city of Milford. At this point, DE 1 curves north and becomes the Milford Bypass, which heads around the eastern part of the city. The route passes between residential development to the west and farmland to the east before turning northwest into wooded areas and coming to a diamond interchange with DE 36.

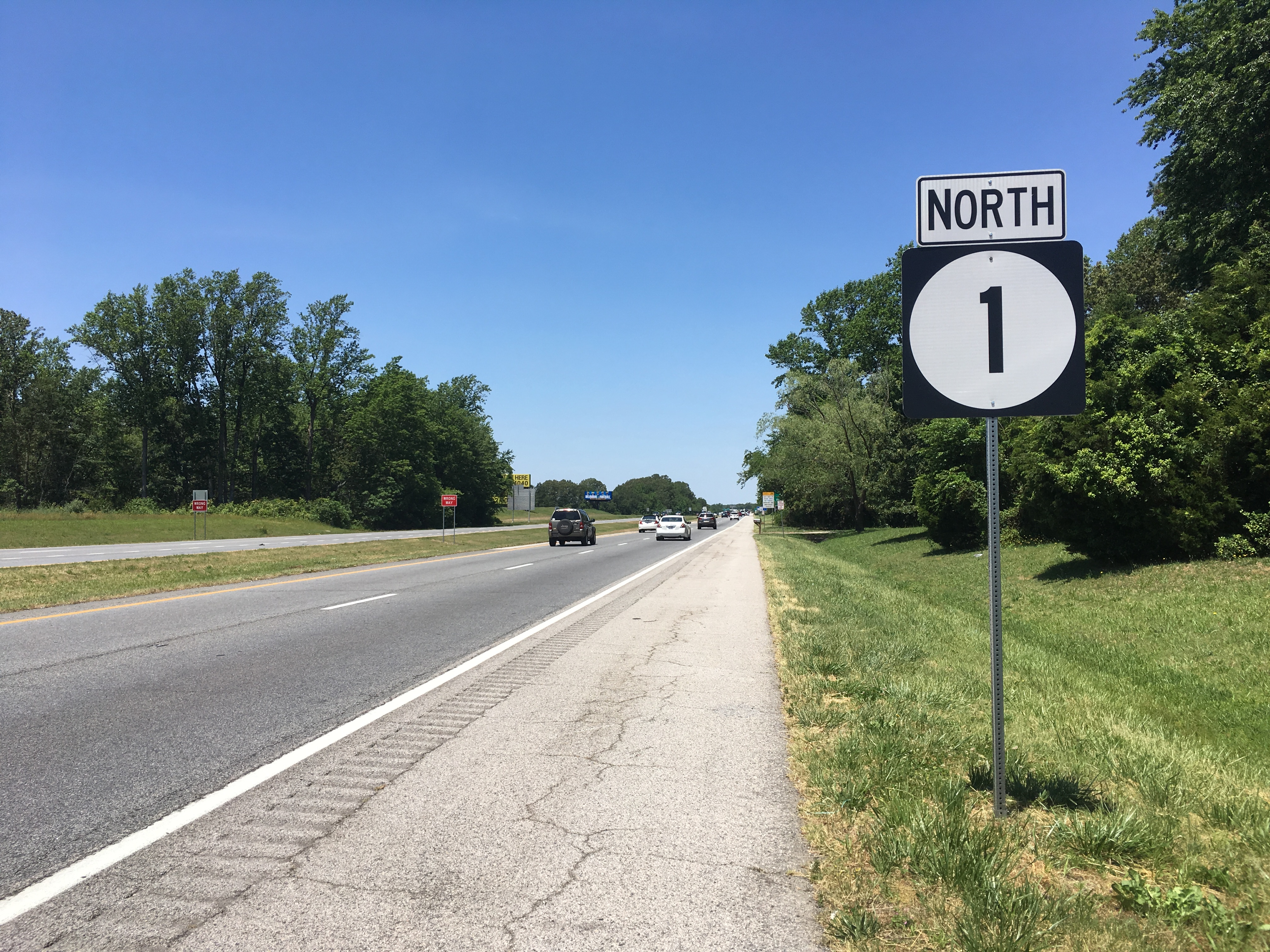
DE 1 northbound past the Frederica Road/Milford Neck Road interchange in Frederica

Past this interchange, DE 1 crosses the Mispillion River into Kent County and continues northwest to an interchange with the eastern terminus of DE 14 serving downtown Milford. The road runs between businesses to the southwest and a wooded residential neighborhood to the northeast, reaching a southbound exit and a northbound exit and entrance with Northeast 10th Street; there is no access across DE 1 at this interchange. The route passes near more development before it comes to a southbound exit and northbound entrance with the northern termini of US 113 and DE 1 Bus. at the northern end of Milford. Past this interchange, DE 1 becomes Bay Road and crosses Swan Creek to the east of Tub Mill Pond before it runs through a mix of farm fields and residential and commercial areas. The route reaches a partial cloverleaf interchange with Thompsonville Road and continues through farmland with some woods and development, crossing Old Baptist Church Branch. The road curves northwest and comes to an interchange with Frederica Road and Milford Neck Road as it passes southwest of the DE Turf Sports Complex and a park and ride lot that are served by the interchange; Frederica Road heads northwest to the town of Frederica. DE 1 bends to the north and bypasses Frederica to the east, crossing the Murderkill River in marshland. The route has an interchange with the eastern terminus of DE 12, which heads south (west) into Frederica. The road runs north through agricultural areas, passing to the west of Barratt's Chapel, before it reaches the community of Little Heaven. Here, DE 1 comes to an interchange that connects to Bowers Beach Road, which leads east to the town of Bowers Beach along the Delaware Bay, and Clapham Road, which heads northwest toward the town of Magnolia and the community of Rising Sun; at this interchange, Old Beach Road serves as a service road to the west while Little Heaven Road serves as a service road to the east. Following this, the road runs through farmland with some woods before coming to a right-in/right-out interchange with Trap Shooters Road, a road that connects to Barkers Landing Road, which provides access to Magnolia. At this point, the route transitions into a four-lane freeway. DE 1 crosses the St. Jones River in marshland on the Barkers Landing Bridge and continues north to a diamond interchange with the southern terminus of DE 9, at which point it enters the city of Dover. At this interchange, the route turns northwest and passes between an asphalt plant and sand plant to the southwest and the runways of Dover Air Force Base to the northeast, with a southbound right-in/right-out serving the asphalt plant and sand plant.

=== Dover Air Force Base to Christiana ===
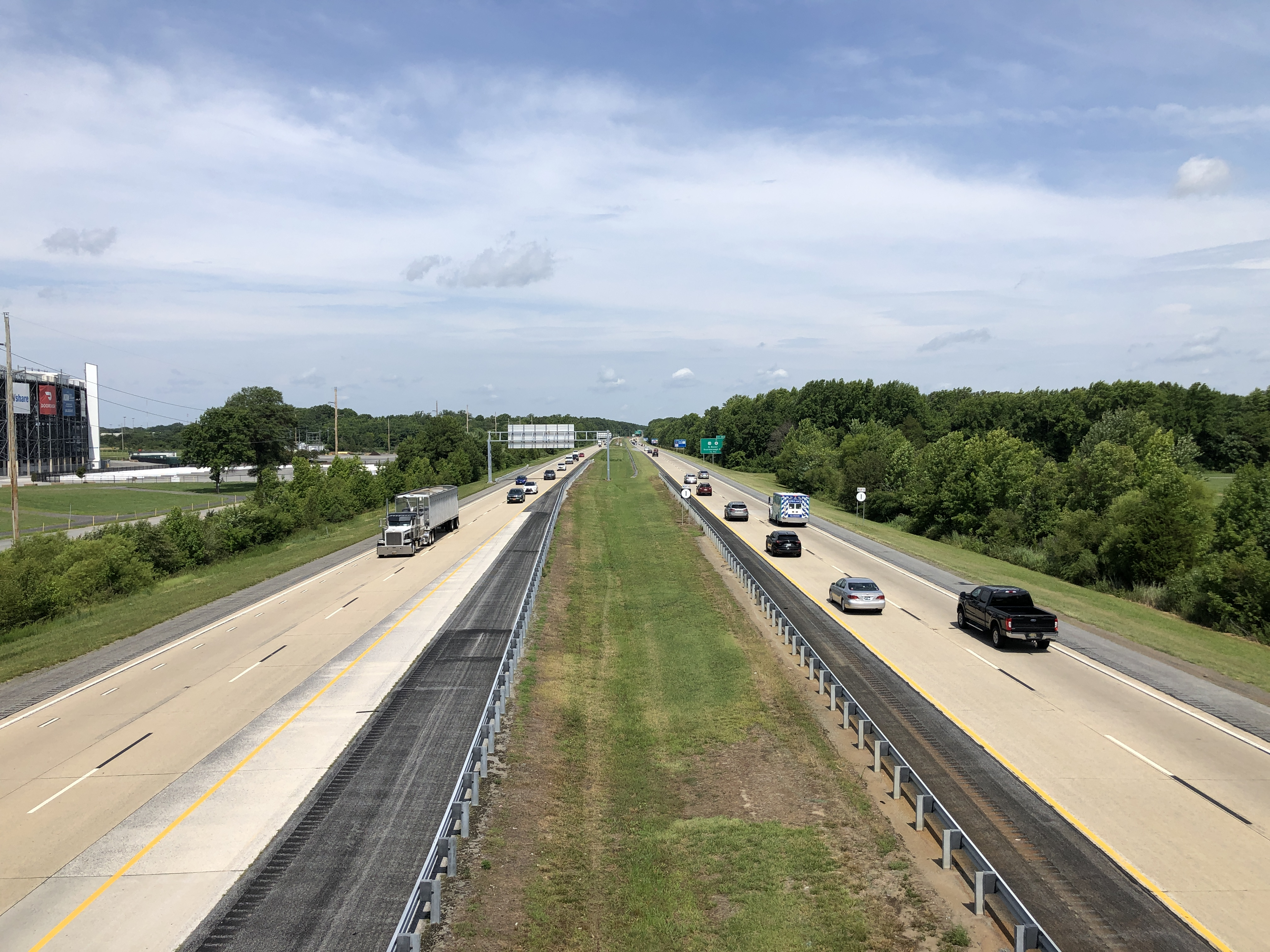
DE 1 northbound in Dover

Along the Dover Air Force Base boundary, DE 1 becomes the Korean War Veterans Memorial Highway. The road comes to a northbound exit and entrance which serves the Commercial Gate of Dover Air Force Base. The freeway passes between the air base golf course to the southwest and various base buildings to the northeast before it reaches a diamond interchange with Old Lebanon Road that provides access to the Main Gate to the northeast and base housing to the southwest. After this, the route continues between base residences and the main part of the base prior to reaching a northbound exit and southbound entrance at the eastern terminus of DE 10 and Bay Road that serves the North Gate of Dover Air Force Base; the route becomes a toll road at this interchange. DE 1 runs north along the west side of Bay Road before it passes over it, where there is a southbound exit and entrance and a northbound entrance that serves to provide access to DE 10 from southbound DE 1 and to northbound DE 1 from DE 10. Immediately after this is a southbound exit and northbound entrance with the Puncheon Run Connector freeway, which heads west toward US 13. The freeway continues north along the eastern edge of Dover and comes to a southbound exit and northbound entrance at DE 8, which provides access to downtown Dover to the west and the town of Little Creek to the east. Past this interchange, the highway turns northwest through rural areas, crossing the Little River before it comes to the Dover mainline toll plaza. DE 1 passes to the northeast of Dover Motor Speedway and the Bally's Dover hotel, casino, and harness racetrack as it runs between campgrounds belonging to the speedway. Past this, the route comes to a trumpet interchange that provides access to US 13 and Scarborough Road, serving the northern part of Dover. This interchange has toll plazas on the southbound exit and northbound entrance. Following this interchange, the toll road leaves Dover and crosses Dyke Branch as it continues through wooded areas with some fields and nearby development. The route heads to the east of the town of Cheswold, passing under DE 42 without an interchange and crossing Alston Branch. The freeway curves north and heads across the Leipsic River. DE 1 continues through rural areas a short distance to the east of US 13 before it reaches the town of Smyrna. Here, the freeway comes to a trumpet interchange serving US 13 at the southern edge of town, with tolls on the southbound exit and northbound entrance. The highway runs along the eastern edge of Smyrna and crosses Mill Creek, heading between residential development to the west and rural land to the east and passing under DE 6 with no access.

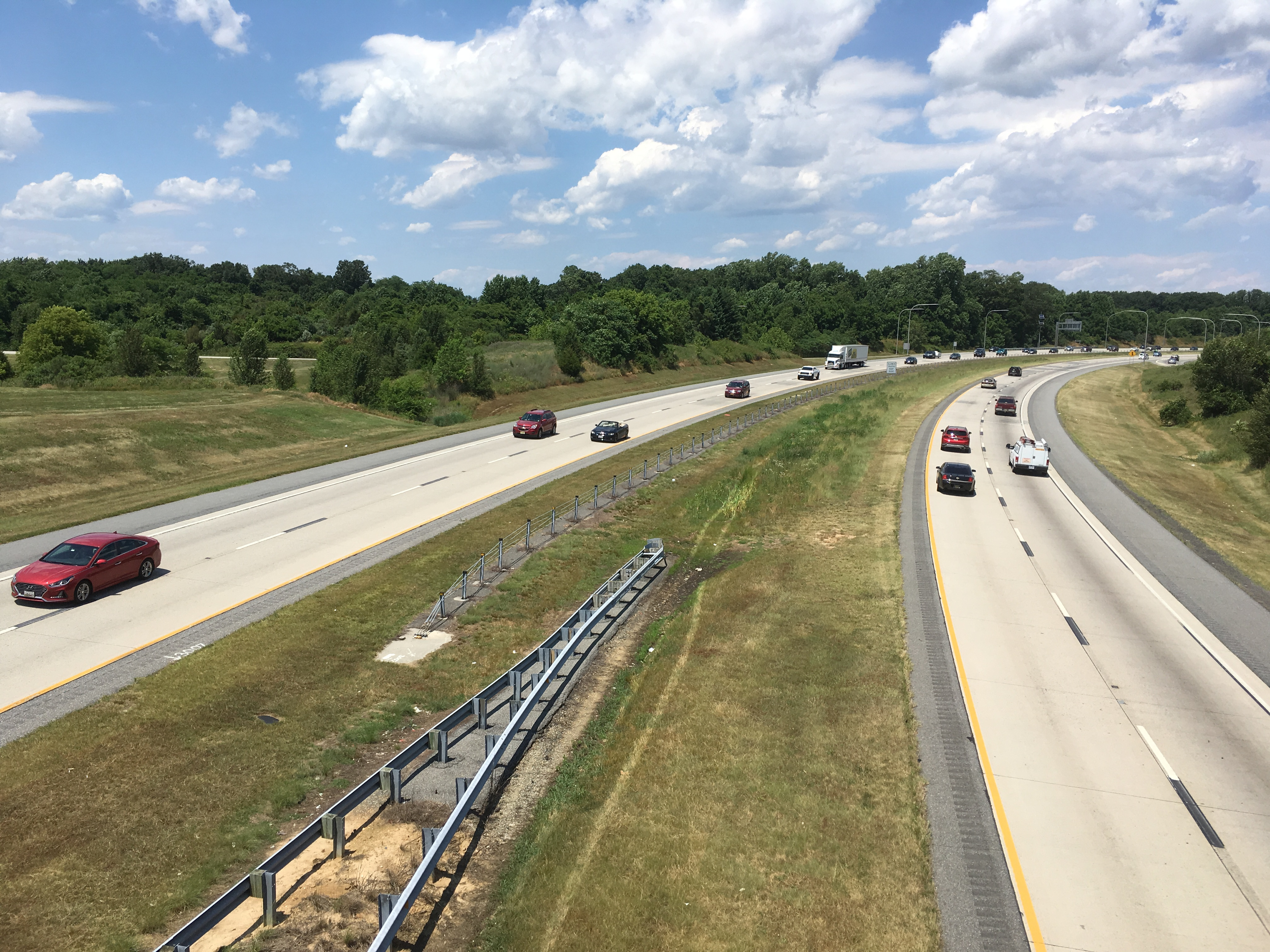
DE 1 northbound at the DE 299 interchange in Middletown

DE 1 curves northwest and crosses the Duck Creek into New Castle County, where it heads through farmland with some woods. The road features a virtual weigh station for trucks in the northbound direction, where trucks can be weighed at highway speeds. The route crosses US 13 at an interchange to the north of Smyrna, with access to the Smyrna Rest Area along US 13 to the south. The freeway continues northwest through rural areas to the west of US 13, curving north and crossing over Sandom Branch and US 13 to briefly travel along the east side of the U.S. highway. The route crosses the Blackbird Creek prior to another bridge over US 13 to again run to the west of it as it passes to the east of the town of Townsend, crossing Herring Run along this stretch. DE 1 heads north and closely follows along the west side of US 13 as it runs through more rural areas with residential development to the east. The freeway turns northwest away from US 13 and crosses the Appoquinimink River, passing to the northeast of a residential neighborhood before coming to a diamond interchange with DE 299, which provides access to the town of Middletown to the west and the town of Odessa and US 13 to the east. Past this interchange, DE 1 curves northeast and passes over US 13 again before it turns north and crosses Drawyer Creek. The freeway continues north a short distance to the east of US 13 past residential subdivisions as it comes to a diamond interchange with Pole Bridge Road, which heads west to intersect US 13 and the southern terminus of DE 896 in the community of Boyds Corner. This interchange has tolls on the northbound exit and southbound entrance. After this interchange, DE 1 curves northwest and crosses over US 13, turning north and reaching the Biddles Corner mainline toll plaza.

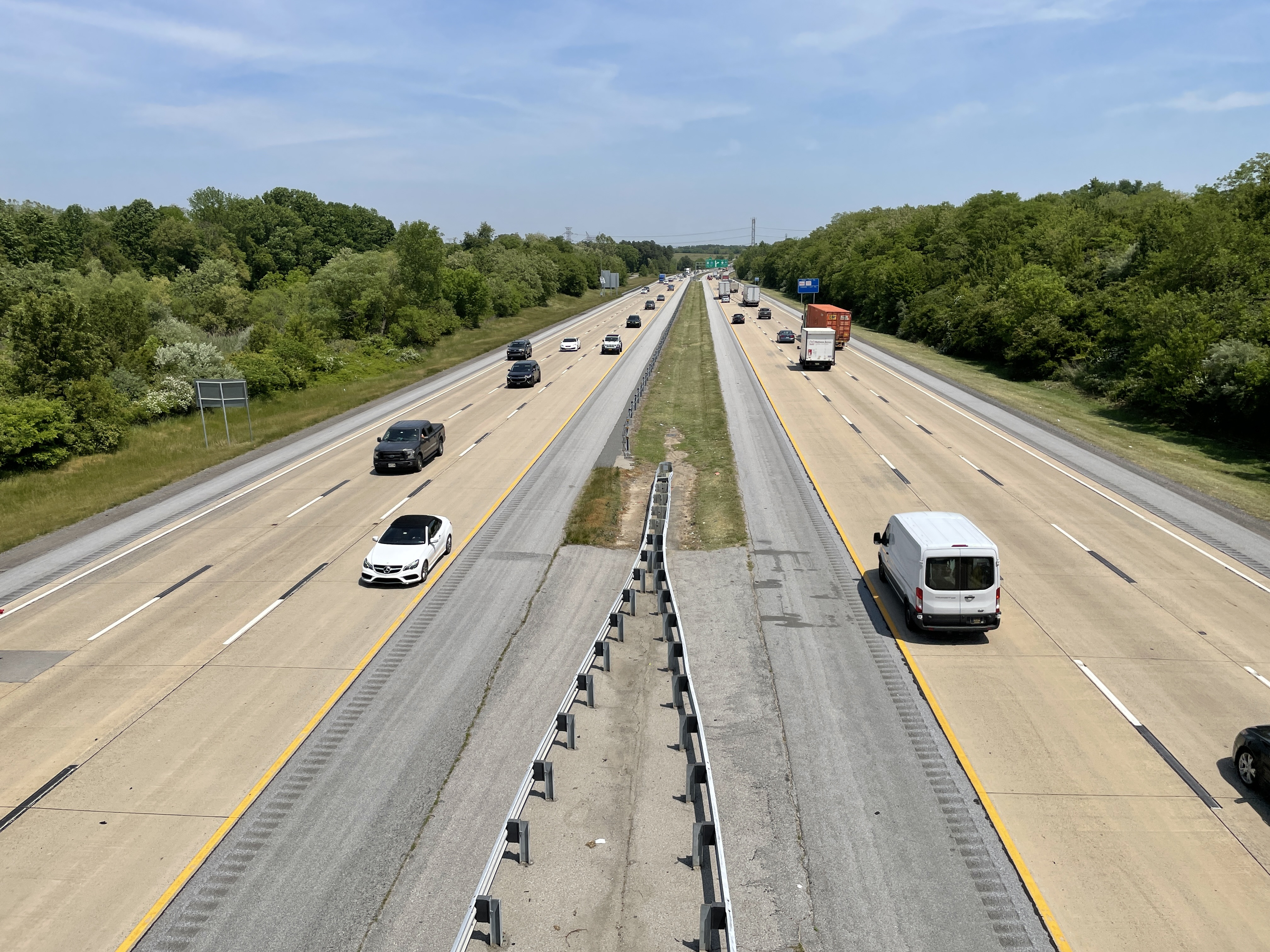
DE 1 and US 13 northbound south of Tybouts Corner

After the toll plaza, DE 1 widens to six lanes and comes to a southbound exit and northbound entrance with the northern terminus of the US 301 toll road. Immediately after, the route has a southbound exit and northbound entrance providing access to US 13 in the community of St. Georges; the southbound exit connects to US 13 by way of Lorewood Grove Road while the northbound entrance consists of a direct ramp from US 13 starting from that route's intersection with Port Penn Road that merges into the ramp from US 301. This interchange marks the north end of the toll road portion of DE 1. The freeway turns northwest and crosses the Chesapeake & Delaware Canal and the Michael N. Castle Trail on the north bank of the canal on the cable-stayed Senator William V. Roth Jr. Bridge. The highway passes through a mix of fields and residential subdivisions and curves north, crossing Dragon Creek before coming to a diverging diamond interchange with US 13 and DE 72 near the community of Wrangle Hill to the west of the city of Delaware City. At this point, US 13 becomes concurrent with DE 1, with the freeway running through farmland and passing over Norfolk Southern's Reybold Industrial Track railroad line and DE 7 without access to the west of PBF Energy's Delaware City Refinery. US 13/DE 1 cross Red Lion Creek and continue concurrent to the community of Tybouts Corner, where DE 1 splits at an interchange to remain as a freeway and US 13 heads northeast as a divided highway with at-grade intersections. Within this interchange is the northern terminus of DE 71 at US 13; southbound DE 1 has a direct ramp to DE 71. Past Tybouts Corner, DE 1 narrows to four lanes and travels north past residential subdivisions, passing over Norfolk Southern's New Castle Secondary railroad line prior to a partial cloverleaf interchange at US 40 in Bear. The highway gains a third auxiliary lane in each direction and continues north to a diamond interchange with DE 273 in Christiana, where the auxiliary lanes end. Past this interchange, the freeway becomes six lanes and runs through wooded areas, crossing the Christina River before it comes to a partial cloverleaf interchange with DE 7 and Mall Road that serves the Christiana Mall and adjacent retail development to the east of the road. At this point, DE 7 joins DE 1 on the four-lane freeway, passing to the west of the shopping mall before DE 1 comes to its northern terminus at a modified cloverleaf interchange with I-95 (Delaware Turnpike) that has flyover ramps from northbound DE 1 to northbound I-95 and from southbound I-95 to southbound DE 1; the flyover ramps split from DE 1 south of the DE 7 interchange. Past I-95, the freeway continues north as part of DE 7 to a partial cloverleaf interchange with DE 58; this interchange uses the exit numbers from DE 1. In the southbound direction, a collector/distributor road serves both DE 58 (intersecting that road at-grade) and I-95. Past DE 58, DE 7 continues north as a divided highway with at-grade intersections.

== Tolls ==
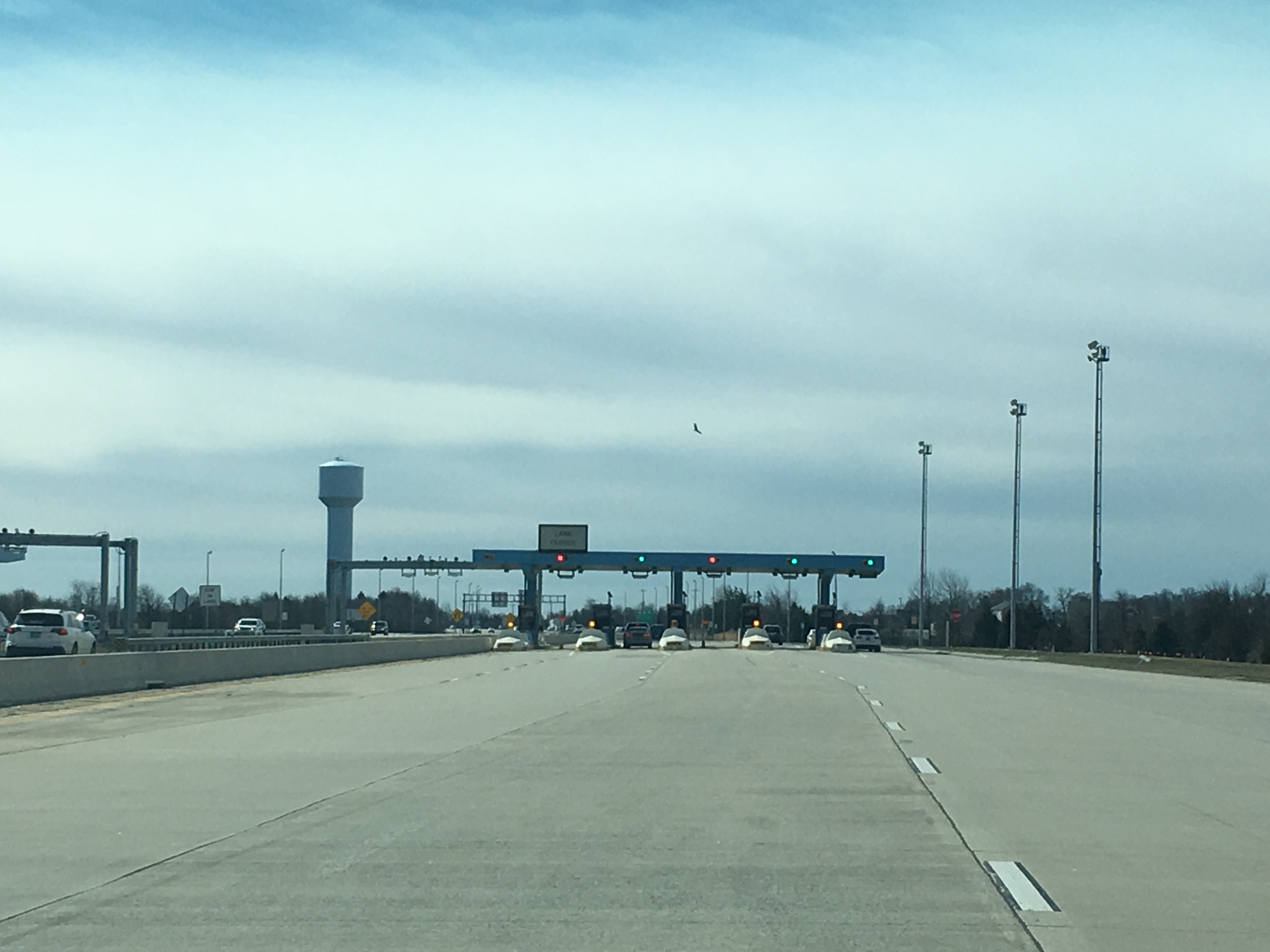
The Biddles Corner mainline toll plaza, with high-speed E-ZPass lanes

The Korean War Veterans Memorial Highway portion of DE 1 is a toll road using a barrier toll system, with mainline toll plazas at Dover and Biddles Corner and ramp tolls at exit 104 for US 13 in North Dover (southbound exit and northbound entrance), exit 114 for US 13 in South Smyrna (southbound exit and northbound entrance), and exit 142 for DE 896 in Boyds Corner (northbound exit and southbound entrance). Tolls may be paid with cash or E-ZPass. The mainline plazas are staffed by toll collectors and also feature high-speed E-ZPass lanes, whereas the ramp plazas are unattended; cash users here must pay by depositing exact change in a basket. As of August 1, 2014, the Delaware Department of Transportation (DelDOT) charges a total of $2 on weekdays and $6 on weekends for passenger vehicles to travel the entire length of the Korean War Veterans Memorial Highway, with the mainline toll plazas each charging passenger vehicles $1 on weekdays and $3 on weekends. Weekend tolls are in effect from 7:00 pm Friday until 11:00 pm Sunday. DelDOT charges passenger vehicles $0.50 for the ramp tolls at exit 104 and exit 142 and $0.25 for the ramp tolls at exit 114. A discount is available for motorists with E-ZPass exiting northbound and entering southbound at exits 104 and 114 north of the Dover toll plaza as well as entering northbound and exiting southbound at exit 142 south of the Biddles Corner toll plaza. This discount is $0.50 for passenger vehicles at exits 104 and 142 and $0.25 for passenger vehicles at exit 114. There is also a frequent user plan in which E-ZPass users who make at least 30 trips in 30 days receive a 50% discount on tolls.

Tolls at the mainline toll plazas were originally $1 for passenger vehicles the whole week. E-ZPass became operational along DE 1 on April 6, 1999, and the Biddles Corner mainline toll plaza opened with high-speed E-ZPass lanes in the same year. On October 1, 2007, tolls on weekends at the mainline toll plazas were increased to $2 for passenger vehicles in order to fund statewide transportation projects. Commercial vehicle tolls also increased by $1 on weekdays and $2 on weekends at this time. On August 1, 2014, the weekend tolls at Dover and Biddles Corner increased to $3 for passenger vehicles in order to again provide funding to transportation projects across the state.

== History ==
=== South of Dover ===
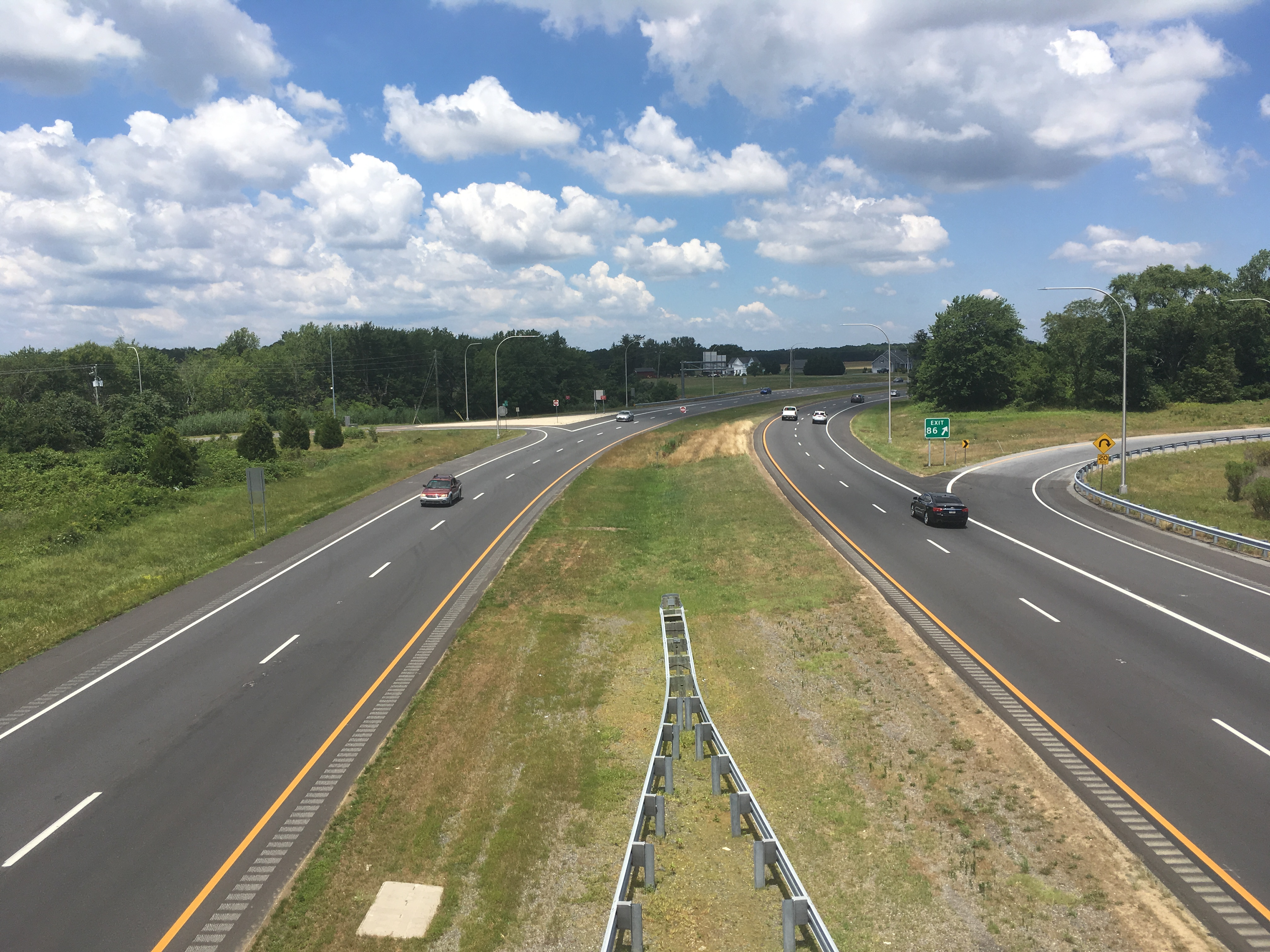
DE 1 northbound at the DE 12 interchange near Frederica

The portion of DE 1 between Milford and Little Heaven was initially built as part of the DuPont Highway, a highway that spanned the state from Selbyville north to Wilmington. The highway was proposed as a modern road that would improve travel and bring economic development to Kent and Sussex counties as part of a philanthropic measure. The DuPont Highway was to be modeled after the great boulevards of Europe and was to have a 200-foot (61 m) wide right-of-way consisting of a 40-foot (12 m) wide roadway for automobiles flanked by dual trolley lines, 30-foot (9.1 m) wide roadways for heavy vehicles, 15-foot (4.6 m) wide unpaved roadways for horses, and sidewalks. Utilities were to be buried underground below the horse roadways. The highway was also to include agricultural experimental stations and monuments for future surveying. Trolley revenues would help pay for the construction of the roadway. After portions of the DuPont Highway were built, these portions were planned to be turned over to the state at no charge.

In 1911, the Coleman DuPont Road, Inc. was established and construction on the highway began. By 1912, construction was interrupted by litigation challenging both the constitutionality of the law establishing the road building corporation and the need for DuPont to acquire such a large right-of-way. DuPont would narrow the proposed right-of-way to 100 feet (30 m) in order to compromise with opponents of the highway in addition to offering landowners whose properties were affected by the highway five times the assessed value of the land five years after the highway was completed. The DuPont Highway would end up being built on a 60-foot (18 m) alignment with a 32-foot (9.8 m) wide roadway. The DuPont Highway north of Milford would be both designed and constructed by Delaware State Highway Department (DSHD). A portion of the road north of Milford and from Frederica to Little Heaven were completed by 1920. The portion of the DuPont Highway from north of Milford to Frederica was under construction in 1920 and completed by 1923, the same year the last section of the entire Selbyville–Wilmington highway was completed near Odessa. When the U.S. Highway System was designated in 1926, this portion of the DuPont Highway became a part of US 113.

The portion of DE 1 between Little Heaven and Dover Air Force Base was built as part of a Dover bypass for US 113. This bypass was built atop existing Bay Road north of the present-day DE 9 interchange and on a new alignment south of there. The new highway between Little Heaven and Bay Road would cross the St. Jones River at a site called Barkers Landing. Between December 1931 and the end of 1933, DSHD constructed a causeway across 3,150 feet (960 m) of the marsh on the east bank of the river, a process that required multiple applications of fill dirt and dynamite to create a stable surface for a modern highway. A Scherzer rolling lift bascule bridge was constructed across the St. Jones River in 1934. Bay Road was widened and the new sections of highway were built with 20-foot (6.1 m) wide concrete pavement starting in 1934. US 113 was relocated to the bypass when the new highway opened for Memorial Day in 1935.

US 113 was widened into a divided highway from north of Milford to south of Frederica and around Dover Air Force Base in 1959. A four-lane divided bypass to the east of Frederica was constructed in 1965, with the former alignment of US 113 through Frederica now Frederica Road. US 113 between Frederica and Little Heaven was expanded in 1975. US 113 between Little Heaven and Dover Air Force Base was expanded to a divided highway in 1984 and 1985; this project included replacing the two-lane drawbridge over the St. Jones River with a four-lane girder bridge.

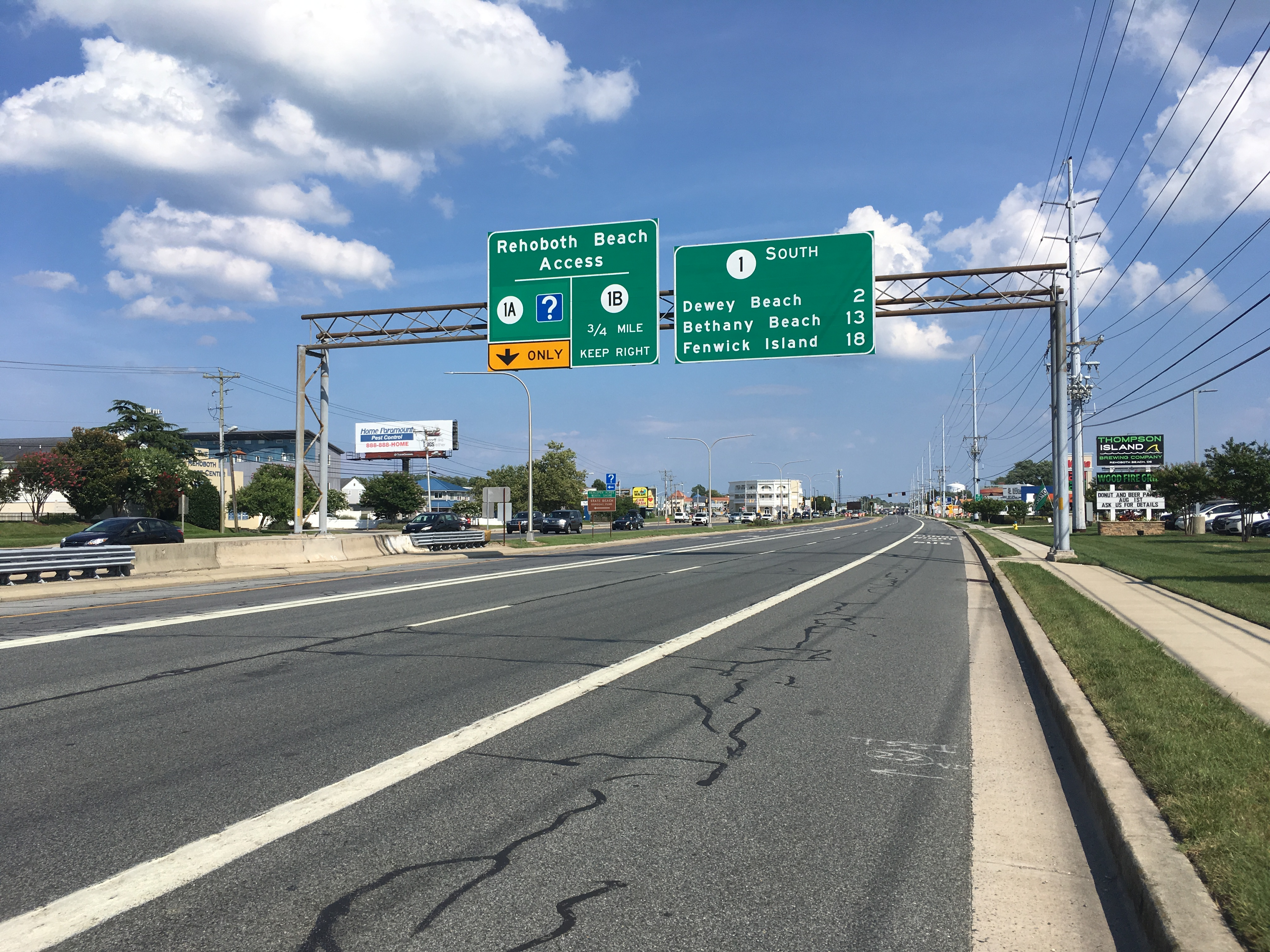
DE 1 southbound approaching DE 1A near Rehoboth Beach

What would become DE 1 between Milford and Rehoboth Beach was originally a county road by 1920. By 1924, the road was proposed as a state highway between Nassau and Rehoboth Beach. A year later, the state highway was completed between Milford and Cedar Creek and from Nassau to just west of Rehoboth Beach, with the sections between Cedar Creek and Nassau and into Rehoboth Beach under proposal. In 1927, the state highway between Milford and Rehoboth Beach was completed with the construction of a bascule bridge over the Broadkill River. In 1931, a state gravel road was extended from Bethany Beach to the Indian River Inlet, providing access to the inlet for recreational purposes. In January 1933, bids were made for construction of a gravel road from Dewey Beach south to the Indian River Inlet as well as for a timber bridge across the inlet, connecting with the gravel road between the Indian River Inlet and Bethany Beach. This gravel road would provide a direct connection between Bethany Beach and Rehoboth Beach and would provide better access to the Atlantic coast for recreation. The Ocean Highway between Bethany Beach and Rehoboth Beach was completed in 1933. In the later part of that year, the roadway between Bethany Beach and Indian River Inlet was paved, with recommendations to pave the road north from the Indian River Inlet toward Rehoboth Beach. In 1934, the Ocean Highway between the Indian River Inlet and Rehoboth Beach was paved. The same year, recommendations were made to extend the Ocean Highway south from Bethany Beach to Fenwick Island, where it would lead to a Maryland state highway continuing to Ocean City.

When Delaware designated its state highway system by 1936, the state highway between Milford and Bethany Beach became a part of DE 14, which continued west from Milford to the Maryland state line near Burrsville, Maryland. In 1939, a southern extension of DE 14 was built between Bethany Beach and the Maryland state line in Fenwick Island as a gravel road. In 1940, a swing bridge opened across the Indian River Inlet. The same year, work began for a bypass of the route between Dewey Beach and west of Rehoboth Beach, which included a bascule bridge over the Lewes and Rehoboth Canal. In 1942, the Rehoboth Beach bypass for DE 14 was completed. In addition, the roadway was paved between Fenwick Island and Bethany Beach by that year. In 1952, a new swing bridge opened across the Indian River Inlet after the previous bridge was destroyed by ice and tides in 1948.

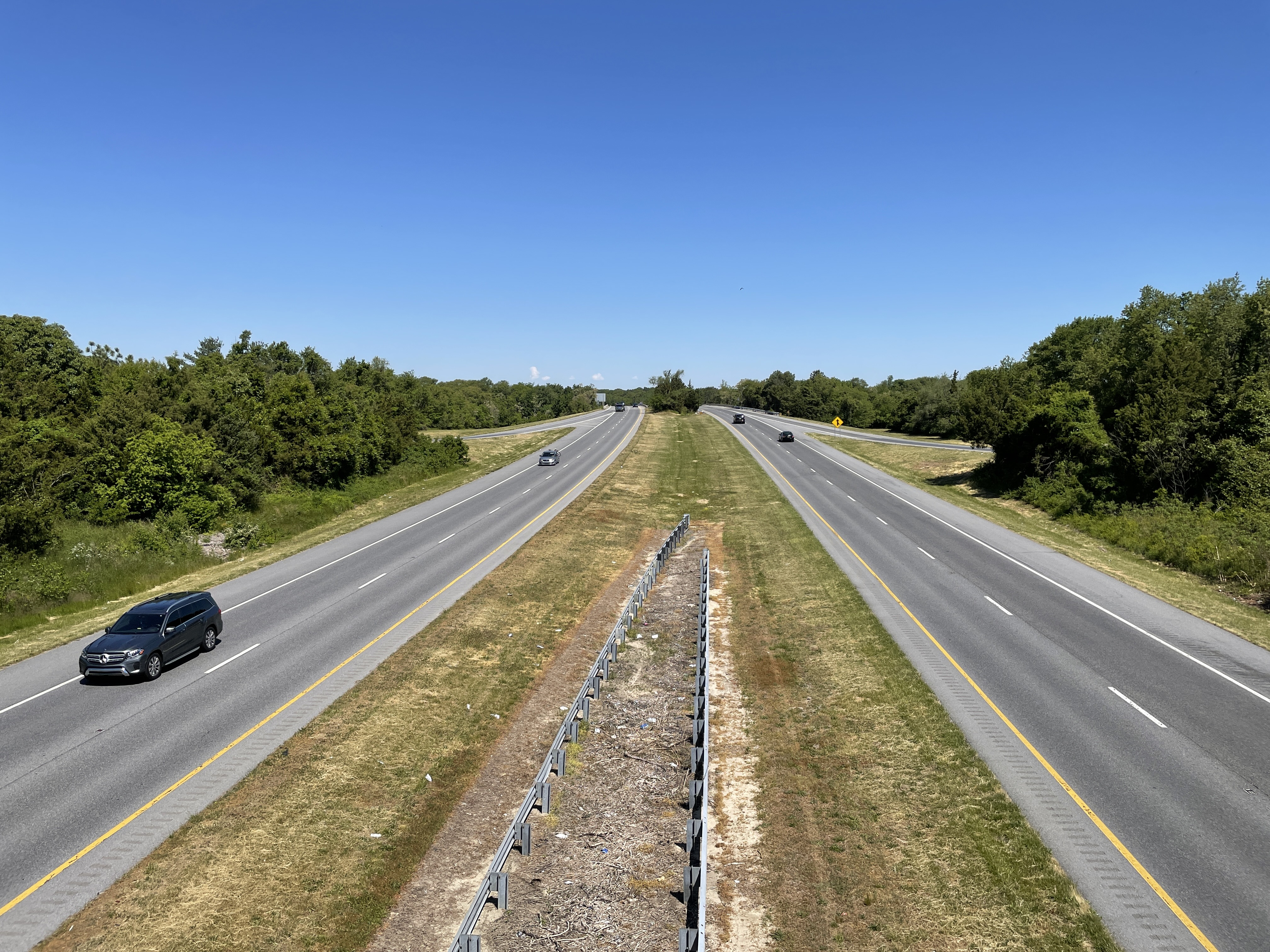
DE 1 northbound at the DE 36 interchange in Milford

The route was widened into a divided highway between DE 18 (now US 9/DE 404) in Nassau and Rehoboth Beach in 1954 in order to provide relief to traffic heading to the beaches. Channelized intersections were built at DE 18 in Nassau and Rehoboth Avenue in Rehoboth Beach. As part of this widening, DE 14 was moved to a new alignment to bypass Wescoats Corner, removing a concurrency with DE 18; the bypassed alignment of DE 14 is now US 9 Bus. (which replaced DE 18) and Wescoats Road. In 1965, a new dual bridge was constructed across the Indian River Inlet. By 1966, DE 14A was designated onto the former alignment of DE 14 through Rehoboth Beach. The divided highway portion of DE 14 was extended north from DE 18 to DE 16, which included a bypass of Nassau, and between the Indian River Inlet and South Bethany in 1967. The former alignment of DE 14 through Nassau is now Nassau Road. By 1967, a divided bypass of Milford running from DE 14 southeast of Milford to US 113 north of Milford was under proposal. Structural design on the Milford Bypass began in 1968. In 1969, design work began on widening DE 14 into a divided highway between DE 16 and the Milford Bypass. The route was widened into a divided highway between Dewey Beach and the Indian River Inlet the same year. In 1971, the divided Miford Bypass between DE 14 southeast of Milford and US 113 north of Milford was completed. In 1971, a contract was awarded to widen DE 14 to a divided highway between Fenwick Island and South Bethany. This widening project was completed a year later. In 1973, construction was underway to make DE 14 a divided highway from the Milford Bypass to DE 16, which included a bypass of Argos Corner; this was completed in 1974. The former alignment of DE 14 through Argos Corner is now Argos Corner Road.

In 1974, DE 1 was signed concurrent with DE 14 east of Milford and on the Milford Bypass. Work began in 1975 to widen the portion of DE 14 bypassing Rehoboth Beach, which included a new bridge over the Lewes and Rehoboth Canal. In 1977, DE 14 was truncated to Milford, with DE 1 replacing the route between Fenwick Island and the south end of the Milford Bypass. As a result of this, DE 14A was renumbered to DE 1A. A new high-level bridge carrying DE 1 over the Lewes and Rehoboth Canal opened in 1978. By 1981, DE 1 was widened to a divided highway between Dewey Beach and southwest of Rehoboth Beach except for the crossing of the canal. In 1985, the crossing over the Lewes and Rehoboth Canal was dualized with a high-level bridge constructed for northbound traffic. DE 1 was designated along US 113 between Milford and Dover in 1988.

In mid 1991, DelDOT enacted corridor preservation measures on DE 1, including its concurrency with US 113, from Dover Air Force Base to Nassau to prevent excessive development along the corridor so it can gradually be transformed into a freeway.

From 1990 to 1991, a jughandle was built between eastbound US 9/DE 404 and northbound DE 1 as part of an reconfiguration of the Five Points intersection that separated the DE 23 and the Plantation Road intersection from US 9/DE 404.

In 2004, the concurrent US 113 designation along DE 1 between Milford and Dover Air Force Base was removed.

Between September 2003 and May 2004, a $5 million improvement project took place on DE 1 between Dewey Beach and the Lewes and Rehoboth Canal bridge that added sidewalks on both sides of the road, a new median, improvements to pavement, drainage, and intersections, and installed pedestrian signals alongside the replacement of traffic signals.

In 2004, DelDOT considered converting the Five Points intersection into an interchange in addition to constructing the Western Parkway. The Western Parkway would have provided a road corridor from DE 1 north of Five Points south to DE 24, running to the west of DE 1. The parkway, which was intended to provide another north-south corridor in the area, was planned to have partial control of access, featuring intersections with existing roads but no private driveways or access to new development. Alternatives for these projects were presented at public workshops between 2004 and 2008, although the projects were cancelled due to lack of support and financial limitations.

On September 11, 2006, work began on a $9.7 million project to widen DE 1 between DE 24 in Midway and US 9/DE 404 in Five Points by adding a third southbound lane and a multi-use lane in both directions. The project was completed on June 9, 2008.

On October 27, 2008, construction began on an interchange at DE 9 near Dover Air Force Base, with Governor Ruth Ann Minner in attendance at the groundbreaking ceremony. Construction of the interchange at DE 9 was completed in September 2009.

In November 2009, construction began for a grade-separated interchange with DE 12 in Frederica; the interchange was completed in June 2011.

In September 2011, the median crossover at the Wilkins Road intersection near the northern terminus of DE 30 was permanently closed. The median crossover at DE 30 Alt. (Johnson Road) was modified to prohibit left turns from northbound DE 30 Alt. to northbound DE 1; only allowing motorists to turn from northbound DE 30 Alt. to southbound DE 1 and to access southbound DE 30 Alt. from both directions of DE 1.

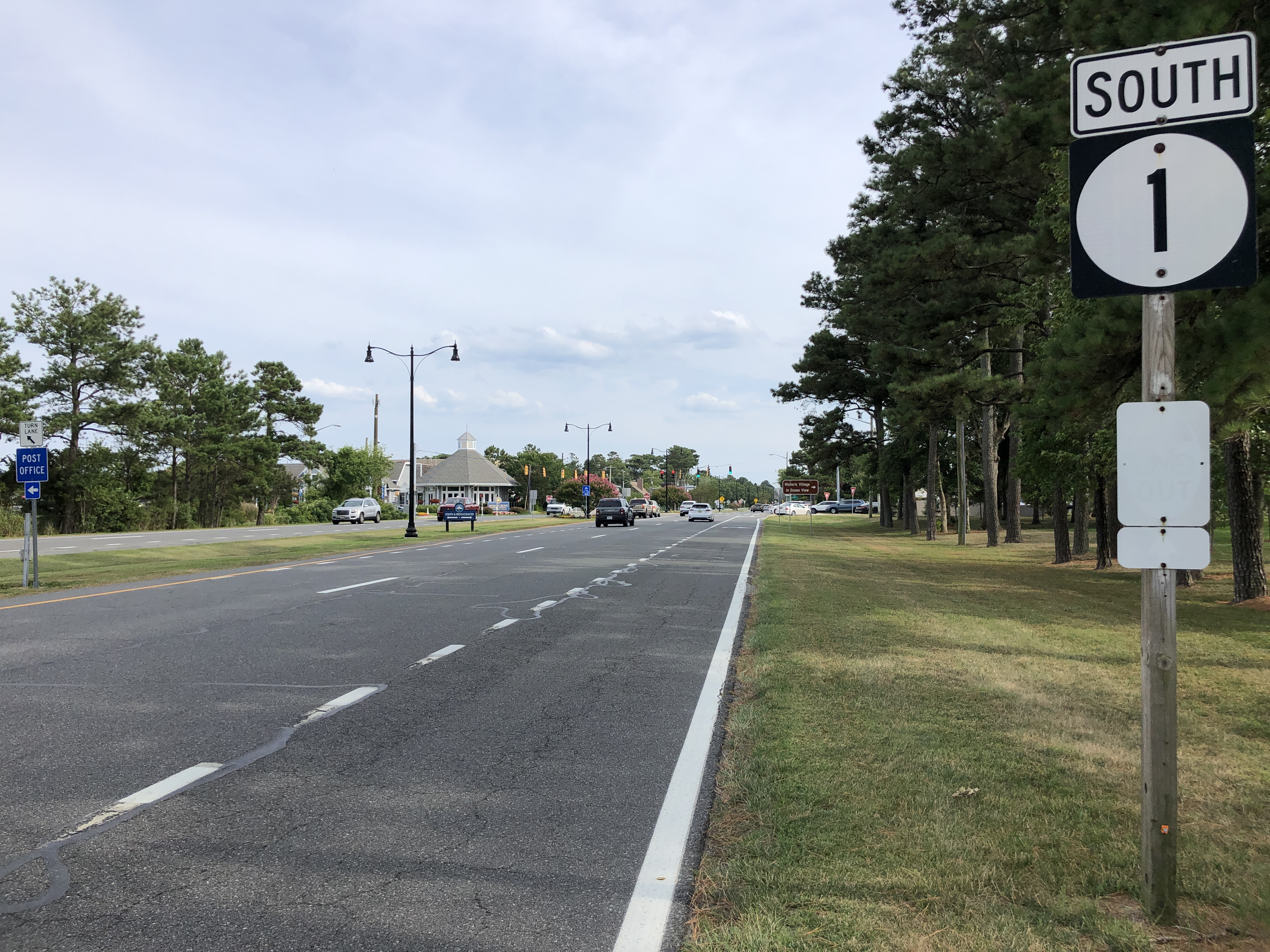
DE 1 southbound approaching DE 26 in Bethany Beach

In 2009, work began to replace the steel-girder Indian River Inlet Bridge with a cable-stayed span due to scouring that had occurred to the steel girder bridge. The new Indian River Inlet Bridge opened to southbound traffic on January 20, 2012. Delaware Governor Jack Markell, U.S. Senator Tom Carper, and DelDOT Secretary Shailen Bhatt rode in the first car across the bridge. On January 30, 2012, one northbound lane of the new bridge opened. All four lanes of the bridge as well as the pedestrian and bicycle walkway opened in early 2012. Demolition of the former bridge began in early 2012 and was completed in early 2013.

In November 2012, construction began on the interchange at DE 30 southeast of Milford, which was completed in July 2014.

In September 2014, a $7.2 million project began for pedestrian improvements along the stretch of DE 1 between the bridge over the Lewes and Rehoboth Canal in Rehoboth Beach and Nassau, which sees heavy pedestrian and bicycle traffic during the summer months. The project added a continuous sidewalk along this segment of road, multiple new crosswalks, and new and improved bus stops. The pedestrian improvement project was completed on June 13, 2016, with Governor Markell, DelDOT secretary Jennifer Cohan, State Representative Peter Schwartzkopf, and State Senator Ernesto Lopez in attendance at a ceremony to mark the completion of the project.

On January 31, 2015, groundbreaking took place for an interchange at Thompsonville Road north of Milford, with Governor Markell and DelDOT secretary Bhatt in attendance. Construction of this interchange involved extending Thompsonville Road west from DE 1 to an intersection with Church Hill Road and Tub Mill Pond Road. The interchange at Thompsonville Road opened in November 2016.

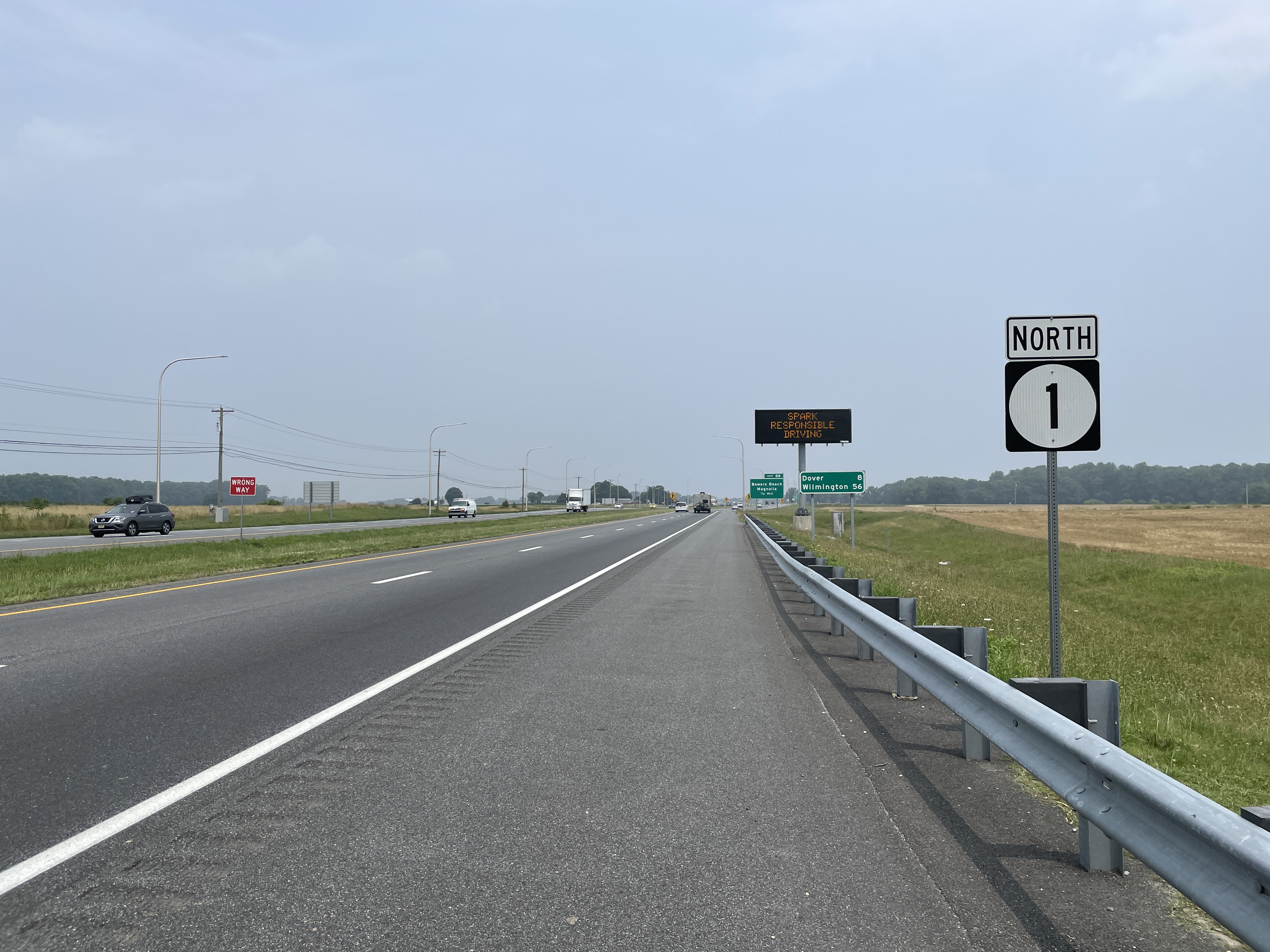
DE 1 northbound past DE 12 near Frederica

On March 18, 2016, a groundbreaking ceremony took place to build an interchange at Frederica Road south of Frederica, with Governor Markell, Senator Carper, and Kent County Administrator Michael J. Petit de Mange present at the ceremony. The Frederica Road interchange south of Frederica opened to traffic on July 10, 2018. A ribbon-cutting ceremony for this interchange was held on August 10, 2018, with Governor Carney, Senator Carper, U.S. Representative Lisa Blunt Rochester, and DelDOT secretary Cohan in attendance.

On March 26, 2018, a groundbreaking ceremony was held to construct an interchange at DE 14 in Milford; Governor Carney, Senator Carper, U.S. Representative Blunt Rochester, and DelDOT secretary Cohan attended the ceremony. Construction of the interchange at DE 14 in Milford eliminated the at-grade intersections with DE 14 and Northeast 10th Street and also built a connector road from DE 14 to Northeast 10th Street. A ribbon-cutting ceremony for the DE 14 interchange took place on May 18, 2019, with DelDOT secretary Cohan, Senator Carper, and State Representative Bryan Shupe in attendance.

On November 9, 2015, construction began on an interchange at Bowers Beach Road and Clapham Road in Little Heaven, with Governor Markell, DelDOT secretary Cohan, U.S. Senators Carper and Chris Coons, and Speaker of the Delaware House of Representatives Peter Schwartzkopf in attendance at the groundbreaking ceremony. Work on the interchange at Bowers Beach Road and Clapham Road built service roads on both sides of the route with a bridge carrying DE 1 over Bowers Beach Road. On December 20, 2017, the ramps connecting southbound DE 1 and Clapham Road opened. The east service road, called Little Heaven Road, was opened on February 27, 2018, and served as the temporary northbound lanes of DE 1 while the bridges over Bowers Beach Road were being built. The new alignment carrying DE 1 over Bowers Beach Road opened to traffic on March 4, 2019; at the same time, access to Bowers Beach Road and Clapham Road transitioned to the ramps and service roads. Two-way traffic was implemented on the Old Beach Road service road to the west on June 14, 2019, and on the Little Heaven Road service road to the east on July 12, 2019. The Little Heaven interchange project cost $44 million and eliminated the last traffic signals along DE 1 in Kent County. A ribbon-cutting ceremony for the interchange took place on August 13, 2019, with Governor John Carney, Lieutenant Governor Bethany Hall-Long, members of the Delaware General Assembly, and DelDOT secretary Cohan in attendance.

In September 2019, the median crossover at Cave Neck Road was modified to prohibit left turns from Cave Neck Road to northbound DE 1 along with U-turns from southbound DE 1; only allowing motorists to turn from Cave Neck Road to southbound DE 1 and to access Cave Neck Road from both directions of DE 1.

The median crossovers at Oyster Rocks Road, Hudson Road, and DE 5 were modified to provide longer deceleration lanes and prohibit left turns. This was completed in June 2020.

In 2021, plans were made to construct a median fence along DE 1 between Read Avenue and Saulsbury Street in Dewey Beach, which is aimed to direct pedestrians to cross the roadway at crosswalks. The median fence was constructed in 2022. This section of fence is a pilot project and the fencing could be extended along the entire length of DE 1 in Dewey Beach in the future.

A direct ramp from southbound DE 1 to US 9/DE 404 at the DE 1D/DE 23 intersection was constructed as part of a reconfiguration of the intersection between US 9/DE 404 and DE 1D/DE 23. The ramp opened on May 16, 2024.

On June 21, 2022, a groundbreaking ceremony was held to mark the beginning of construction of an interchange with DE 16 east of Milton, with Governor Carney, DelDOT secretary Nicole Majeski, and state and local officials in attendance. On May 31, 2023, northbound DE 1 traffic was shifted to the completed northbound ramps to allow for construction of the grade separation. Traffic along southbound DE 1 was temporarily shifted to the former northbound lanes on July 19, 2023, in order for the grade separation and southbound ramps to be constructed. On April 22, 2025, southbound DE 1 was shifted to the new alignment passing over DE 16 and the ramps connecting southbound DE 1 and DE 16 opened to traffic. Construction of the interchange at DE 16 is planned to be completed in the later part of 2025.

In early 2024, construction began on a median cable barrier along DE 1 between DE 30 in Milford and Trap Shooters Road near Magnolia in order to prevent crossover crashes; construction is planned to be finished in early 2025. In the future, the median cable barrier will be extended further south along DE 1.

There are plans to replace two more at-grade intersections along the route with grade-separated interchanges. The two intersections to be upgraded to interchanges are Cave Neck Road in Overbrook and Minos Conaway Road in Nassau. Construction of the interchange at Cave Neck Road is planned to start in 2026 and be finished in 2028. On June 20, 2025, a groundbreaking ceremony was held for the Minos Conaway Road interchange. Construction of the interchange at Minos Conaway Road is planned to be completed in 2028. As part of constructing the interchange at Minos Conaway Road, nine median crossovers will be eliminated along DE 1 and traffic will be directed to the interchange.

=== Korean War Veterans Memorial Highway ===
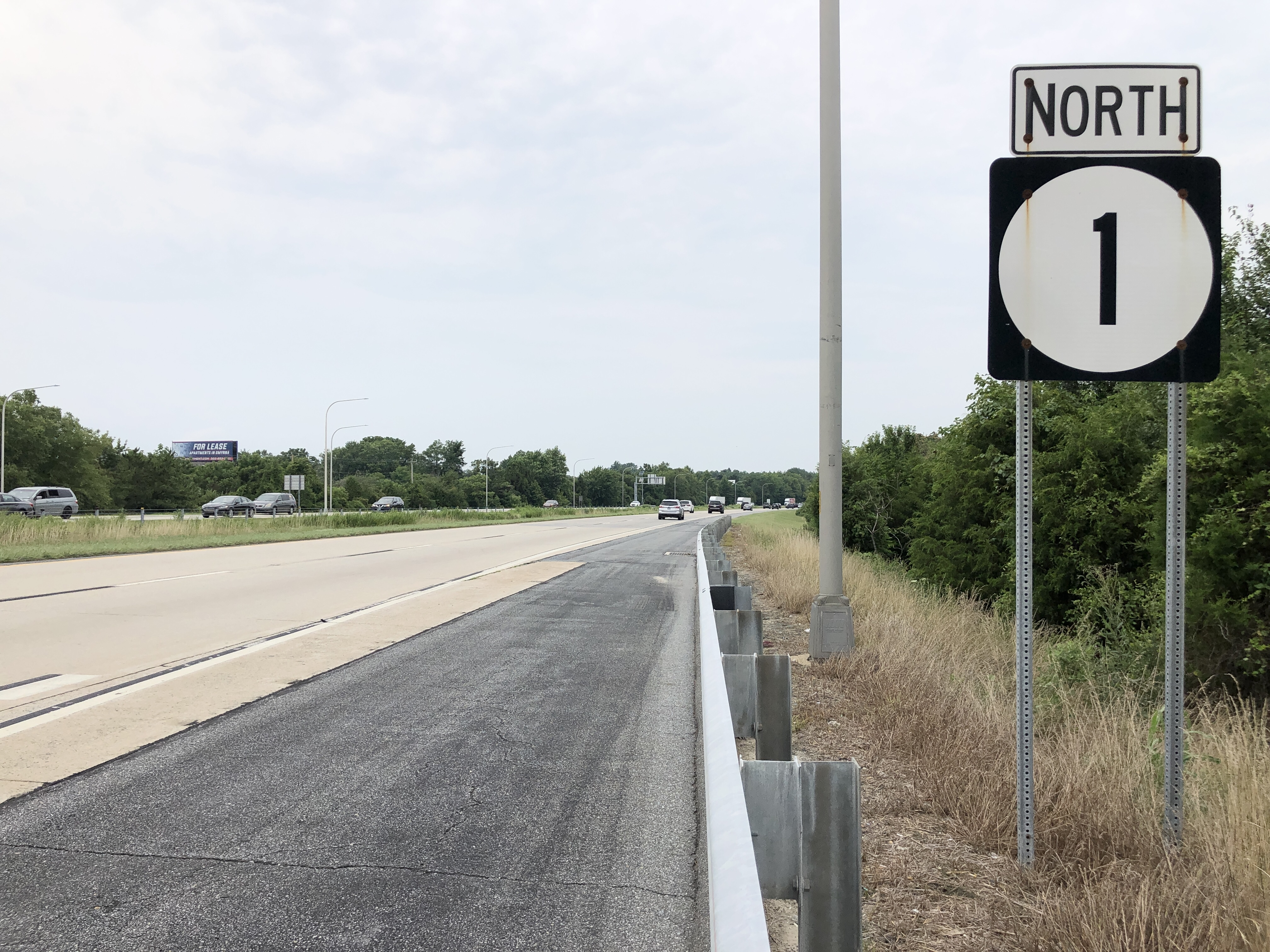
DE 1 northbound past the US 13 interchange in the southern part of Smyrna

Between 1958 and 1971, studies were conducted for a bypass of the segment of US 13 through Dover along with a connector between Dover and Frederica. The proposed routing began at US 113 and DE 12 north of Frederica and continued northwest to Woodside, where it was planned to cross US 13. From here, the bypass was to run to the west of Dover and head north to its terminus at US 13 north of Cheswold. As part of planning of the Dover Bypass, an archaeological survey had to be conducted along part of the proposed route between 1972 and 1975. By 1976, construction of the Dover Bypass was postponed indefinitely. From 1971 to 1978, a north-south extension of the Delaware Turnpike (I-95) between Wilmington and Dover was studied. This extension was proposed to run from north of I-95 in Ogletown south to US 13 near Camden. The toll road would head south from Ogletown and cross the Chesapeake & Delaware Canal on the Summit Bridge to reach a connector to US 301 near the Maryland state line. From here, the turnpike would bypass Middletown, Clayton, Smyrna, and Dover to the west before coming to US 13. Intermediate interchanges were to be located west of Dover, at DE 6 west of Smyrna, west of Middletown, at DE 896 south of the Summit Bridge, DE 71 north of the Summit Bridge, US 40, and I-95. The north-south extension of the Delaware Turnpike was to have a combination of ramp tolls and mainline toll barriers. Three mainline toll barriers were to be located between I-95 and US 40, between Middletown and Smyrna, and north of Camden. The projected cost of the project in 1972 was $107 million. In 1983, studies began for a "Relief Route" of US 13 between Dover and Wilmington. The new highway was proposed in order to relieve US 13 of traffic heading to the Delaware Beaches in the summer. The Relief Route for US 13 was planned as a toll road in order to help pay for the cost of the construction of the highway. Prior to the beginning of construction, an archaeological survey was conducted along the proposed route of the freeway in 1986. The same year, plans were unveiled for the route, which would begin at US 113 south of Dover and head north to US 13 in Tybouts Corner. The Relief Route would cross US 13 several times, passing to the east of Dover and Smyrna and to the west of Odessa. The section of DE 1 between Tybouts Corner and Christiana had originally been planned as a relief route for DE 7, a two-lane road connecting US 13 to I-95 that saw a lot of congestion. In July 1987, construction began on the first segment of the freeway between US 40 in Bear and DE 273 in Christiana. In 1988, the US 13 Relief Route was given the DE 1 designation. DE 1 was extended from its northern terminus in Milford to follow US 113 between Milford and Dover and US 13 between Dover and Tybouts Corner. Construction on the freeway between US 13 in Tybouts Corner and US 40 in Bear began in March 1988. In August of that year, groundbreaking took place for the section of the DE 1 toll road between Dover and Smyrna. Construction commenced on DE 1 between DE 273 and I-95 in Christiana in August 1990. The first section of the DE 1 freeway opened in August 1991 between US 13 in Tybouts Corner and US 40 in Bear. Three months later, the freeway opened north to DE 273 in Christiana.

In April 1992, groundbreaking took place for the section of DE 1 between St. Georges and Tybouts Corner. It was decided that the highway would cross the Chesapeake & Delaware Canal on a cable-stayed bridge. The section of DE 1 between DE 273 and I-95 in Christiana opened in April 1993. In August of that year, southbound DE 1 between US 113 at Lafferty Lane in Dover and US 113 south of DE 10 at Dover Air Force Base was opened to traffic. In September 1993, bicyclists were allowed on a section of the under-construction DE 1. The portion of the route bypassing Smyrna was finished in November of that year. The section of the tollway between US 113 at Dover Air Force Base and US 13 south of Smyrna opened on December 21, 1993, with Governor Tom Carper in attendance at the opening ceremony. This section opened with a mainline toll barrier and ramp tolls. Following the completion of this section, DE 1 was rerouted off US 113 and US 13 between Dover and Smyrna. When this portion of DE 1 opened, road signs, with the exception of speed limit signs, were in metric units in anticipation of the United States converting to the metric system. The section of DE 1 between Dover and Smyrna had exit numbers based on kilometerposts while the section between Tybouts Corner and Christiana originally had exit numbers based on mileposts.

In 1997, the exit numbers along the portion of the route between Tybouts Corner and Christiana were changed to reflect kilometerposts.

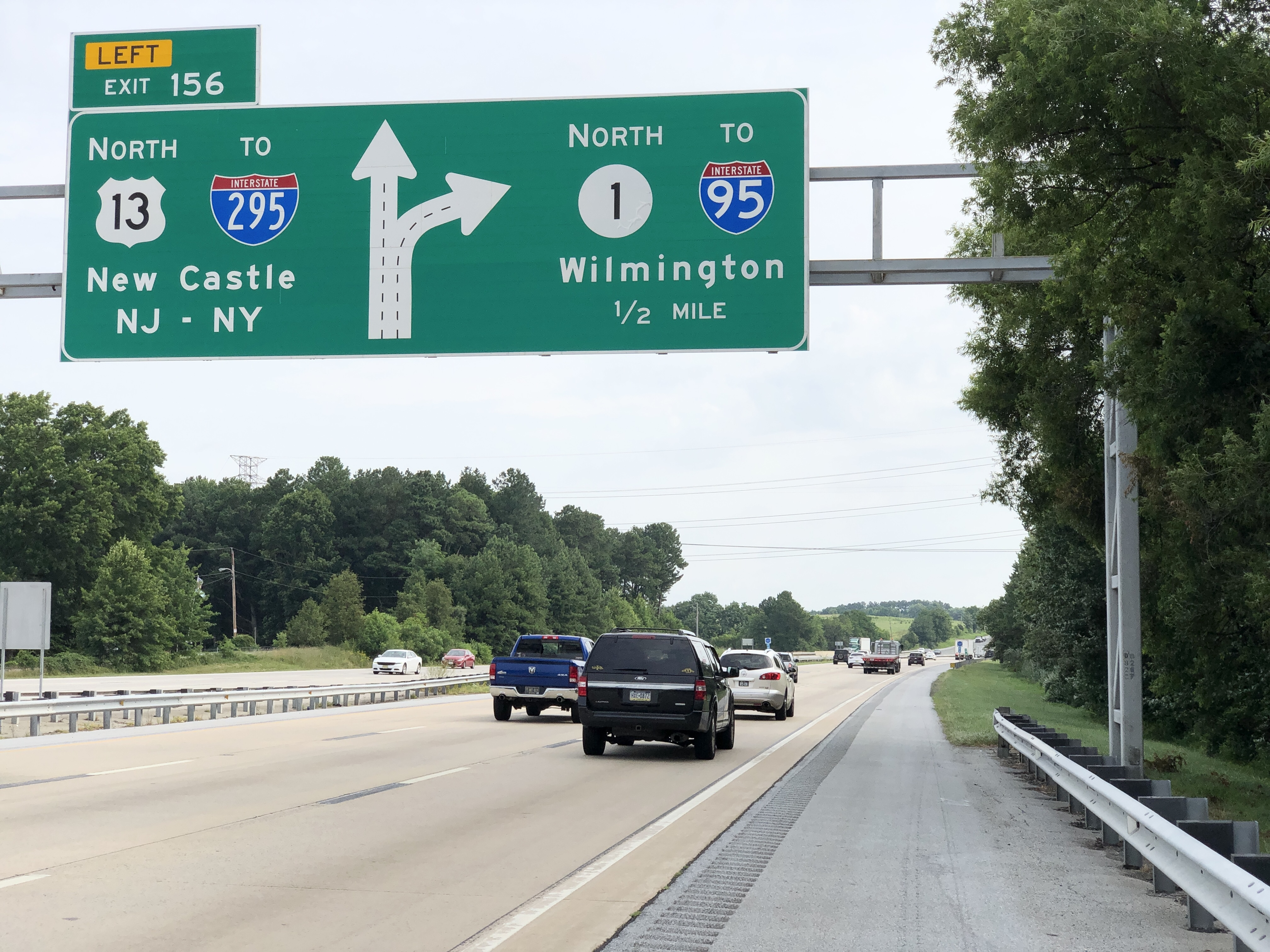
DE 1 northbound approaching the split with US 13 northbound in Tybouts Corner

In December 1995, the section of DE 1 between US 13 in St. Georges and US 13 in Tybouts Corner opened, which included the Chesapeake & Delaware Canal Bridge (now called the Senator William V. Roth Jr. Bridge). Prior to the opening of this section, a bridge walk was held over the canal. Following the completion of this segment, DE 1 was rerouted off the surface alignment of US 13 that crossed the canal on the St. Georges Bridge. In addition, US 13 was rerouted to follow the new DE 1 between the DE 72 interchange and Tybouts Corner. Construction of the new DE 1 had severed US 13 south of Tybouts Corner, with part of the former alignment north of the DE 7 intersection becoming a two-lane road while the section south of there became an extended DE 7 to the intersection with US 13 and DE 72. In building DE 1 across the Chesapeake & Delaware Canal, there were initially plans to demolish the aging St. Georges Bridge that carried US 13 over the canal. The plan drew concerns from residents in St. Georges who feared the community would be split in half. The St. Georges Bridge was instead kept and was refurbished. A southbound exit and northbound entrance at US 13 south of the Chesapeake & Delaware Canal Bridge along DE 1 was built as required by federal legislation that gave the state $115 million toward construction of the new canal bridge.

E-ZPass became operational at the Dover Toll Plaza on April 6, 1999.

DE 7 from I-95 to north of DE 58 became an extension of the freeway in 1999 with an interchange built at DE 58 in a $25 million construction project.

The extension of the DE 1 freeway south through Dover Air Force Base was constructed later than the Dover to Smyrna segment due to the need to coordinate negotiations with the military installation and to allow the base to remediate hazardous material sites, maintain security and access restrictions with construction of a new Main Gate, and reconstruct base housing on the west side of the highway. Construction of an interchange at the Dover Air Force Base Main Gate commenced in February 1996. This project resulted in the relocation of the Main Gate further back in order to build the interchange and the overpass linking the Main Gate to base housing. This construction resulted in facilities having to be constructed at the North Gate in order to be able to handle base traffic. In May of that year, groundbreaking took place for the DE 1 toll road between Odessa and St. Georges. The first contract of the Dover Air Force Base Main Gate interchange was completed in December 1998, with the second contract beginning in March 1999. The segment of DE 1 between US 13 south of Odessa and US 13 in St. Georges opened in November 1999. DE 1 was subsequently rerouted off US 13 between those two points. The Biddles Corner mainline toll plaza contained a high-speed E-ZPass gantry, with four lanes, two in each direction.

On September 5, 2002, a partial interchange opened at DE 8 in Dover, utilizing the existing emergency vehicle ramps. This interchange was included in the initial plans for the highway but was dropped due to low traffic volumes. As part of building the interchange, DelDOT purchased development rights to adjacent land parcels in order to prevent additional development in the area of the interchange.

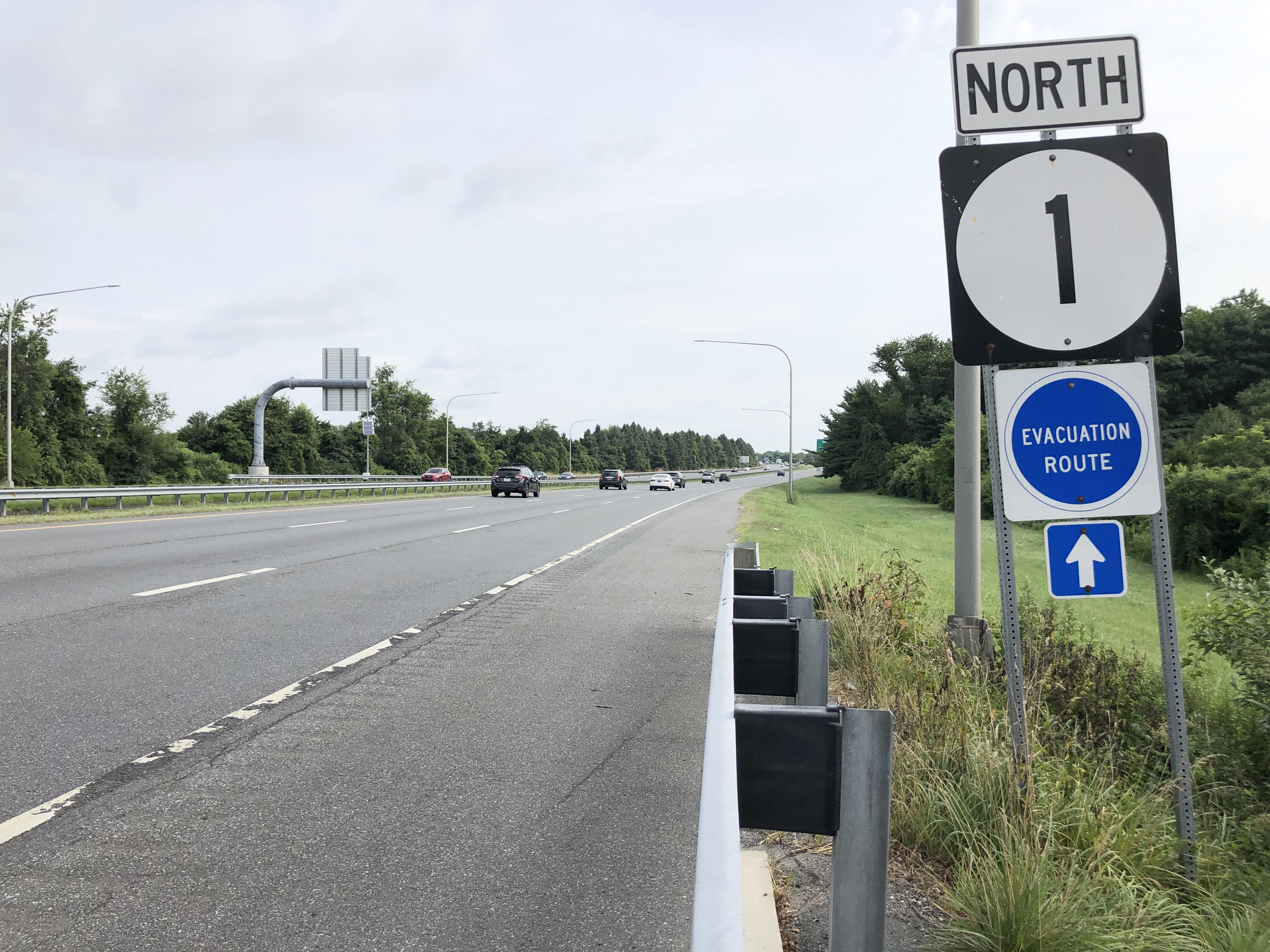
DE 1 northbound past the US 40 exit in Bear

In March 2000, groundbreaking took place for the final segment of the DE 1 freeway between Smyrna and Odessa. The interchange at the Dover Air Force Base Main Gate was completed in July of that year. The construction of the final segment resulted in a portion of US 13 south of Odessa being shifted further east as DE 1 would be built on top of the road. A service road would serve properties on the southbound side of US 13. In October 2001, northbound US 13 was realigned to the new alignment south of Odessa in order to build DE 1 in that area. In May 2002, US 13 was shifted to a new southbound alignment south of Odessa, with the former portion of the route in that area becoming a service road known as Harris Road. On May 19, 2003, Governor Minner cut the ribbon for the final section of the DE 1 toll road between US 13 north of Smyrna and US 13 south of Odessa. This section opened to traffic two days later. As a result, DE 1 was moved off US 13 between Smyrna and Odessa. The total cost to build the toll road was $900 million and it was the largest public works project in Delaware history. As part of building DE 1, DelDOT created new wetlands to replace the ones that were lost in construction of the highway. As a result of the completion of the final section, the northbound exit and southbound entrance with US 13 south of Odessa was removed.

On May 24, 2004, a dedication ceremony was held marking the completion of four new high-speed E-ZPass lanes at the Dover mainline toll plaza, with DelDOT secretary Nathan Hayward III and Dover Mayor Stephen Speed in attendance; the lanes opened to traffic on May 27.

In November 2006, the Chesapeake & Delaware Canal Bridge was renamed the Senator William V. Roth Jr. Bridge after in honor of U.S. Senator William V. Roth Jr., who not only lent his name to the Roth IRA, but was instrumental in securing federal funding to build the bridge.

Traffic congestion at the interchange with I-95 in Christiana forced DelDOT to prematurely reconstruct the interchange. The project included adding flyover connecting ramps from northbound DE 1 to northbound I-95 and from southbound I-95 to southbound DE 1 which allowed for easier merging patterns and the elimination of lengthy backups on the former ramp design. Construction began in February 2011 with work to replace the bridge over DE 1/DE 7 leading to the Christiana Mall in order to allow room for the flyover ramps; this bridge was completed in March 2012. The ramp from southbound I-95 to southbound DE 1 opened on August 27, 2013, and the ramp from northbound DE 1 to northbound I-95 opened on October 17, 2013, with a ribbon-cutting ceremony attended by Governor Markell and DelDOT secretary Bhatt.

A project began on September 21, 2015, to construct a northbound auxiliary lane between the US 40 and DE 273 interchanges in order to reduce congestion, which was completed in November 2015.

On April 29, 2016, Governor Markell, DelDOT secretary Cohan, and local officials attended a groundbreaking ceremony for a $7 million project that rebuilt the DE 72 interchange into a diverging diamond design, the first such interchange in Delaware. The diverging diamond interchange configuration was put into place on November 19, 2016.

On April 19, 2017, a virtual weigh station was opened along northbound DE 1 south of the interchange with US 13 north of Smyrna. This weigh station allows trucks to be weighed at highway speeds; trucks with possible violations are instructed by signs to exit and follow US 13 north to a weigh station in Blackbird for additional screening and assessment while trucks with no issues are allowed to remain on DE 1. The virtual weigh station was constructed to ensure trucks traveling north through Delaware were being weighed after the completion of DE 1 in 2003 allowed truck traffic to bypass the weigh station along US 13.

On December 24, 2018, a replacement entrance ramp from US 13 to northbound DE 1 in St. Georges was opened, located further south to the Biddles Corner mainline toll plaza.

A new interchange with southbound US 301 opened to traffic on January 10, 2019.

On March 17, 2020, cash tolls were suspended at the Dover and Biddles Corner mainline toll plazas due to the COVID-19 pandemic, with all tolls collected electronically through the high-speed E-ZPass lanes and motorists without E-ZPass billed by mail; cash tolls resumed on May 21, 2020.

On March 20, 2020, construction began on a southbound auxiliary lane between the DE 273 and US 40 interchanges; this auxiliary lane opened to traffic in November 2020.

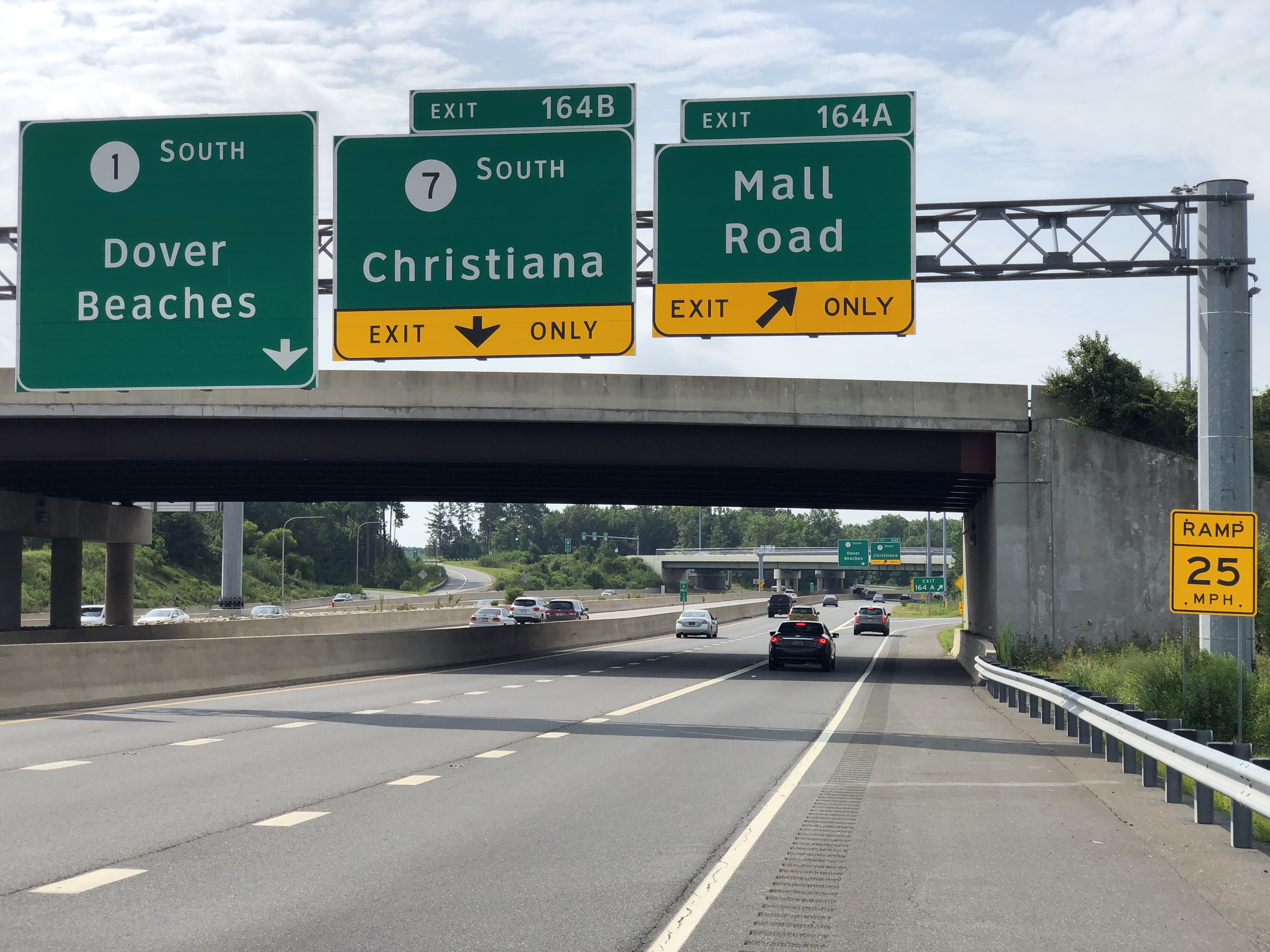
DE 1/DE 7 southbound at the Mall Road interchange in Christiana

DelDOT has plans to widen DE 1 by an additional lane in each direction between the Senator William V. Roth Jr. Bridge and the DE 273 interchange in Christiana. The project will involve widening bridges and reconfiguring interchanges. The project is currently in the design and planning stage. On October 27, 2021, a virtual public workshop on the widening and reconstruction project between the Senator William V. Roth Jr. Bridge and DE 273 was held. The preferred alternative for the project includes the construction of a southbound exit and northbound entrance at Newtown Road and the reconstruction of the DE 273 interchange into a single-point urban interchange. The construction project of widening DE 1 between US 40 in Bear and DE 7 in Christiana will receive federal funding from the Infrastructure Investment and Jobs Act signed into law by President Joe Biden in 2021, which will allow for an earlier start to the project.

There is a proposal to construct an interchange along DE 1 in Dover that would provide direct access to the Dover Mall in order to improve business at the shopping mall. The interchange, which is planned to cost $31 million, is supported by mall owner Simon Property Group along with government officials. The interchange would include toll plaza on its ramps.

== Major intersections ==
County	Location	mi	km	Old exit	New exit	Destinations	Notes
Sussex	Fenwick Island	0.00	0.00			MD 528 south (Coastal Highway) – Ocean City	Continuation into Maryland
Sussex	Fenwick Island	0.10	0.16			DE 54 west (Lighthouse Road)	Eastern terminus of DE 54
Sussex	Bethany Beach	6.08	9.78			DE 26 west (Garfield Parkway) – Millville, Ocean View	Signed eastern terminus of DE 26
Sussex		10.62	17.09			Delaware Seashore State Park South Inlet	Interchange
Sussex	Indian River Inlet	11.26	18.12	Indian River Inlet Bridge			
Sussex	Dewey Beach	17.17	27.63			DE 1A north (King Charles Avenue) – Rehoboth Beach	Southern terminus of DE 1A; access from southbound DE 1 to northbound DE 1A via St. Louis Street
Sussex	Rehoboth Beach					DE 1B north (Washington Street/State Road) – Rehoboth Beach	Interchange; southern terminus of DE 1B
Sussex	Rehoboth Beach					Oyster House Road	Interchange; no southbound entrance; southbound exit via South Timberlake Trail
Sussex	Rehoboth Beach	18.93	30.46			DE 1A south (Rehoboth Avenue) – Rehoboth Beach	Northern terminus of DE 1A; access to Rehoboth Beach-Dewey Beach Chamber of Commerce and Visitors Center; no southbound access from DE 1A
Sussex	Midway	21.13	34.01			DE 24 west (John J. Williams Highway / DE 1D north) – Millsboro	Eastern terminus of DE 24; southern terminus of DE 1D
Sussex	Carpenters Corner	22.55	36.29			US 9 east (Dartmouth Drive) – Cape May–Lewes Ferry	Southern end of US 9 concurrency
Sussex	Nassau	23.67	38.09			US 9 west / DE 404 west (Lewes Georgetown Highway) / US 9 Bus. east (Savannah Road) to DE 1D south / DE 23 south – Georgetown, Bay Bridge, Lewes	Northern end of US 9 concurrency; termini of DE 404 and US 9 Bus.; no access from westbound US 9 Bus. to eastbound US 9/southbound DE 1
Sussex	Nassau	25.10	40.39		40	Nassau Road, Minos Conaway Road	Interchange under construction
Sussex		30.46	49.02		49	DE 16 (Broadkill Road) – Milton, Greenwood, Bay Bridge, Broadkill Beach	Interchange under construction
Sussex		32.68	52.59			DE 5 south (Union Street Extended) – Milton	Northern terminus of DE 5; no access from northbound DE 1 to DE 5
Sussex	Milford					DE 30 – Lincoln, Milford	Interchange; northbound exit and entrance via Wilkins Road
Sussex	Milford	39.91	64.23			DE 1 Bus. north – Milford	Interchange; northbound exit and southbound entrance; southern terminus of DE 1 Bus.
Sussex	Milford	41.42	66.66			DE 36 – Milford, Slaughter Beach	Interchange
Kent	Milford					DE 14 west – Downtown Milford	Interchange; eastern terminus of DE 14; southbound exit and entrance via South Silicato Parkway
Kent	Milford	43.96	70.75			US 113 south / DE 1 Bus. south – Milford, Georgetown	Interchange; southbound exit and northbound entrance; northern terminus of US 113/DE 1 Bus.
Kent		44.90	72.26		79	Thompsonville Road	Interchange
Kent	Frederica	48.26	77.67		82	To DE 12 – South Frederica	Interchange; access via Frederica Road and Milford Neck Road; access to Killens Pond State Park
Kent	Frederica	49.89	80.29		85	DE 12 west – North Frederica	Interchange; eastern terminus of DE 12; access to Killens Pond State Park
Kent	Little Heaven	51.66– 52.12	83.14– 83.88		88	Bowers Beach, Magnolia	Interchange; access via Bowers Beach Road and Clapham Road
Kent				Southern end of freeway section			
Kent					89	Magnolia	Interchange
Kent	Dover AFB	56.22	90.48		90	DE 9 north – Kitts Hummock, Little Creek	Southern terminus of DE 9; access to Dover AFB Commercial Gate from southbound via U-turn at interchange; access to Air Mobility Command Museum and John Dickinson Plantation
Kent	Dover AFB				91	Allan Myers Dover Asphalt Plant	Southbound exit and entrance
Kent	Dover AFB	57.00	91.73		92	Dover AFB Commercial Gate	Northbound exit and entrance
Kent	Dover AFB	57.88	93.15		93	Dover AFB Main Gate, Visitors	Access via Old Lebanon Road
Kent	Dover AFB	57.88	93.15	Southern terminus of Korean War Veterans Memorial Highway			
Kent	Dover AFB	58.60	94.31		94	DE 10 west – Dover, Camden	Northbound exit and southbound entrance; eastern terminus of DE 10; also serves Bay Road; to US 13; last northbound exit before toll; access to Historic Dover
Kent	Dover AFB	59.71	96.09		95	To DE 10 – South Dover, Camden, Dover AFB North Gate	No northbound exit; access via Bay Road
Kent	Dover	60.00	96.56		97	To US 13 – Salisbury, Norfolk	Southbound exit and northbound entrance; access via Puncheon Run Connector
Kent	Dover	61.37	98.77		98	DE 8 – Downtown Dover, Little Creek	Southbound exit and northbound entrance; access to Bayhealth Hospital, Kent Campus, and Historic Dover
Kent	Dover			Dover Toll Plaza			
Kent	Dover	65.24	104.99		104	US 13 to DE 8 / Scarborough Road – North Dover, Dover Downs	Tolled southbound exit and northbound entrance; Dover Downs signed southbound; access to Delaware Tech, Delaware State University, and Wilmington University
Kent	Smyrna	71.47	115.02		114	US 13 to DE 6 / DE 300 – South Smyrna	Tolled southbound exit and northbound entrance; DE 6/DE 300 signed northbound; access to Bombay Hook National Wildlife Refuge
New Castle	Smyrna	76.17	122.58		119	US 13 to DE 6 / DE 300 – North Smyrna, Rest Area, Townsend	Signed as exits 119A (south) and 119B (north) southbound; North Smyrna signed northbound; DE 6/DE 300, Smyrna, and Rest Area signed southbound; last southbound exit before toll
New Castle	Middletown	85.20	137.12		136	DE 299 to US 13 – Odessa, Middletown, Townsend	Townsend signed southbound; last northbound exit before toll; access to Odessa Historic District
New Castle	Boyds Corner	89.12	143.42		142	DE 896 north – Mt. Pleasant, St. Georges, Boyds Corner	Tolled northbound exit and southbound entrance; access via Pole Bridge Road; St. Georges signed northbound; Boyds Corner signed southbound
New Castle	Biddles Corner			Biddles Corner Toll Plaza			
New Castle	Biddles Corner	91.18	146.74		147	US 301 Toll south – Annapolis	Southbound exit and northbound entrance; northern terminus of US 301
New Castle	St. Georges	92.0	148.1		148	To US 13 – South St. Georges	Southbound exit and northbound entrance; southbound exit via Lorewood Grove Road; last southbound exit before toll
New Castle	Chesapeake & Delaware Canal			Senator William V. Roth Jr. Bridge			
New Castle	Wrangle Hill	94.89	152.71		152	US 13 south / DE 72 to DE 7 – Delaware City, Newark, St. Georges, Business District	Southern end of US 13 concurrency; DE 7 and Newark signed northbound; US 13, St. Georges, and Business District signed southbound; access to Fort DuPont State Park, Fort Delaware State Park, and Lums Pond State Park
New Castle	Tybouts Corner	97.08	156.24	96	156	US 13 north to I-295 (US 40 east) – New Castle, New Jersey, New York	Northbound exit and entrance; northern end of US 13 concurrency
New Castle	Tybouts Corner	97.08	156.24	96	156	US 13 north / DE 71 south – Wilmington, Red Lion	Southbound exit and entrance; signed as exits 156A (south) and 156B (north)
New Castle	Bear	99.28	159.78	98	160	US 40 – Bear, Glasgow	
New Castle	Christiana	101.01	162.56	99	162	DE 273 – Newark, New Castle	
New Castle	Christiana			100	164	DE 7 south / Mall Road – Christiana	Northbound exit and southbound entrance
New Castle	Christiana				165C	I-95 north – Wilmington, Philadelphia	Northbound left exit and southbound left entrance; exit 4A on I-95
New Castle	Christiana	101.89	163.98			DE 7 north to I-95 south – Churchmans Crossing	Northern terminus
1.000 mi = 1.609 km; 1.000 km = 0.621 mi: Concurrency terminus; Incomplete access; Tolled

== Special routes ==
=== DE 1A ===
Delaware Route 1A
- Location: Dewey Beach–Rehoboth Beach
- Length: 2.01 mi (3.23 km)
- Existed: 1974–present

Delaware Route 1A (DE 1A) is a state highway in Sussex County. The route, which is signed north-south, runs 2.01 mi (3.23 km) from DE 1 in the town of Dewey Beach north to another intersection with DE 1 west of the city of Rehoboth Beach. The route provides access to Rehoboth Beach from DE 1, heading north before turning to the west. DE 1A follows King Charles Avenue, Bayard Avenue, 2nd Street (southbound), Christian Street (northbound), and Rehoboth Avenue.

What is now DE 1A was originally a part of DE 14 between 1936 and 1942. The road was designated DE 14A by 1966. In the 1970s, DE 1A was designated along DE 14A for a few years before DE 14A was decommissioned in favor of DE 1A. Between 2002 and 2006, a streetscape project revitalized the Rehoboth Avenue portion of the route and a roundabout was added at the northern entrance to Rehoboth Beach.

=== DE 1B ===
Delaware Route 1B
- Location: Rehoboth Beach
- Length: 0.75 mi (1,210 m)
- Existed: 1974–present

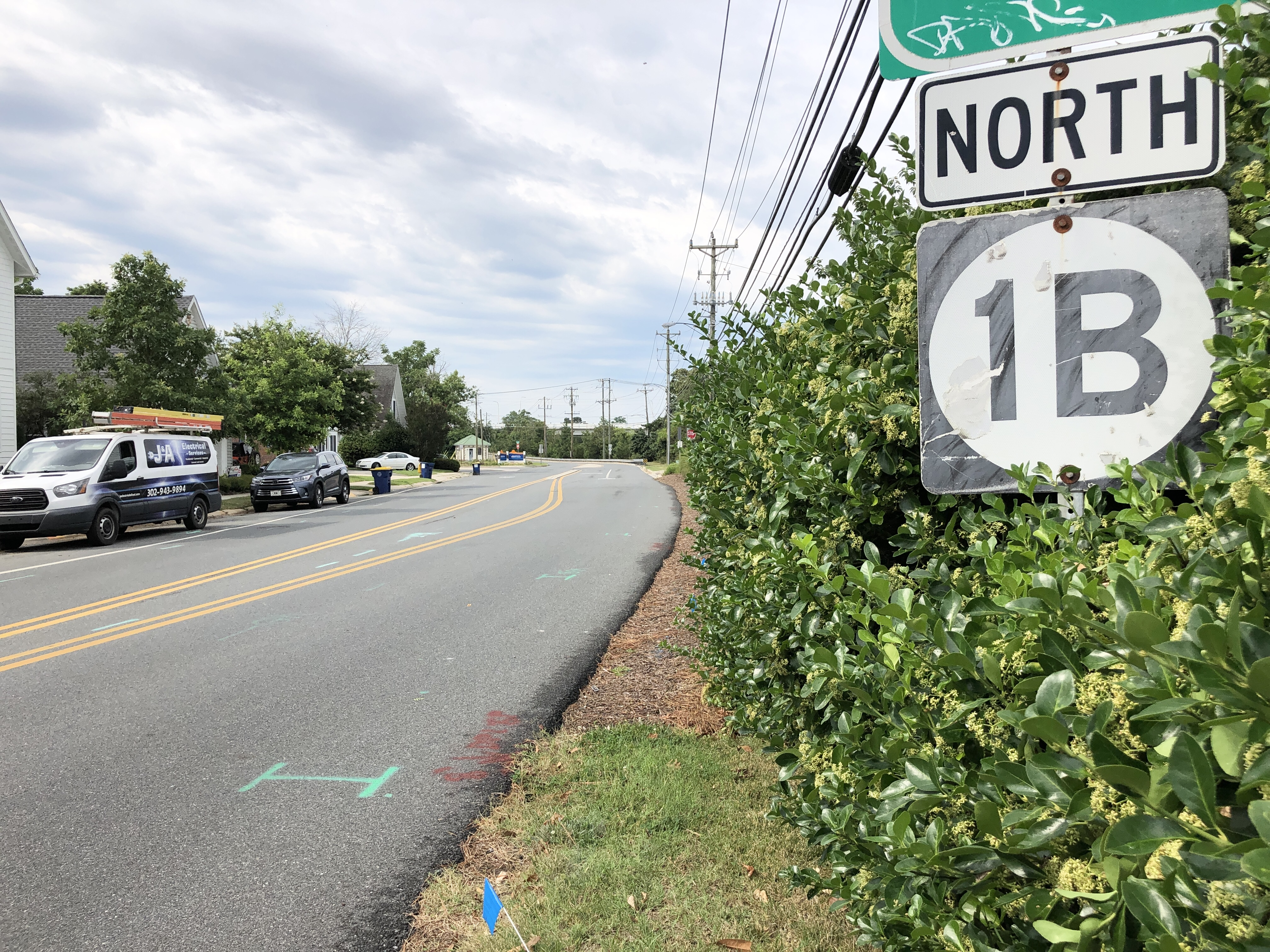
DE 1B northbound at Canal Street in Rehoboth Beach

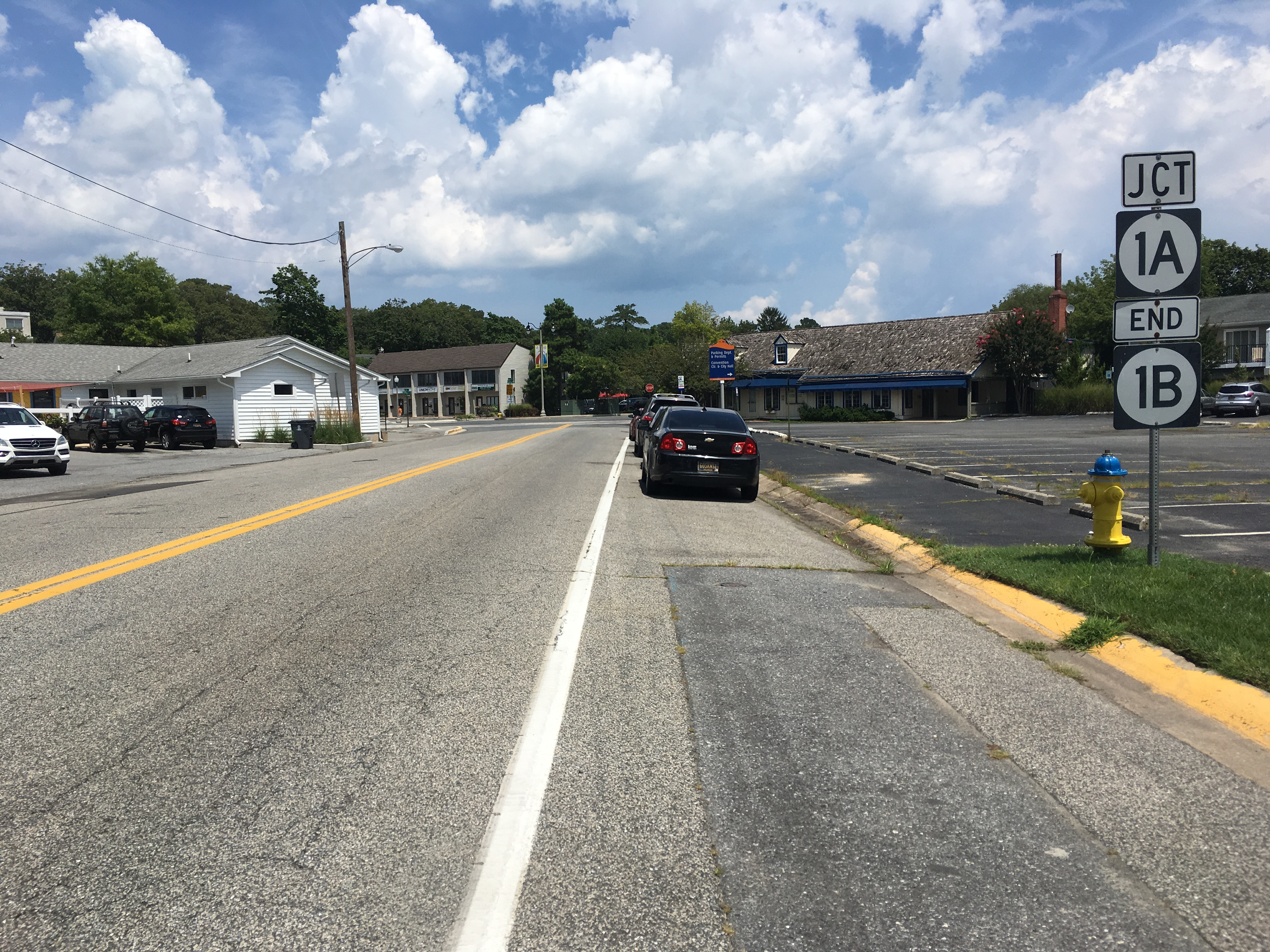
DE 1B approaching its terminus at DE 1A in Rehoboth Beach

Delaware Route 1B (DE 1B) is a 0.75-mile (1.21 km) state highway spur of DE 1 that allows access to and from the city of Rehoboth Beach in Sussex County. DE 1B starts at the southern approach to the Lewes and Rehoboth Canal bridge on DE 1, with right-in/right-out ramps providing access to both directions of DE 1. From this point, DE 1B heads southwest from the southbound lanes of DE 1 as two-lane undivided Washington Street, soon turning northwest onto Jefferson Street. The road curves north and becomes Roosevelt Street, passing under the DE 1 bridge over the canal. The route intersects State Road, which provides access to and from the northbound lanes of DE 1, at which point it heads northeast away from the canal on State Road. DE 1B continues into Rehoboth Beach and passes homes before reaching its terminus at DE 1A. At this intersection, left turns are prohibited from DE 1B to DE 1A northbound. DE 1B has an annual average daily traffic count ranging from a high of 2,485 vehicles at the DE 1A intersection to a low of 1,588 vehicles on the connector to northbound DE 1.

Major intersections
The entire route is in Rehoboth Beach, Sussex County.

mi	km	Destinations	Notes
0.00	0.00	DE 1 (Coastal Highway) – Dewey Beach, Dover	Interchange; southern terminus
0.75	1.21	DE 1A (Rehoboth Avenue)	Northern terminus; no access from DE 1B to northbound DE 1A
1.000 mi = 1.609 km; 1.000 km = 0.621 mi: Incomplete access

=== DE 1D ===
Delaware Route 1D
- Location: Midway–Nassau
- Length: 3.92 mi (6.31 km)
- Existed: 1996–present

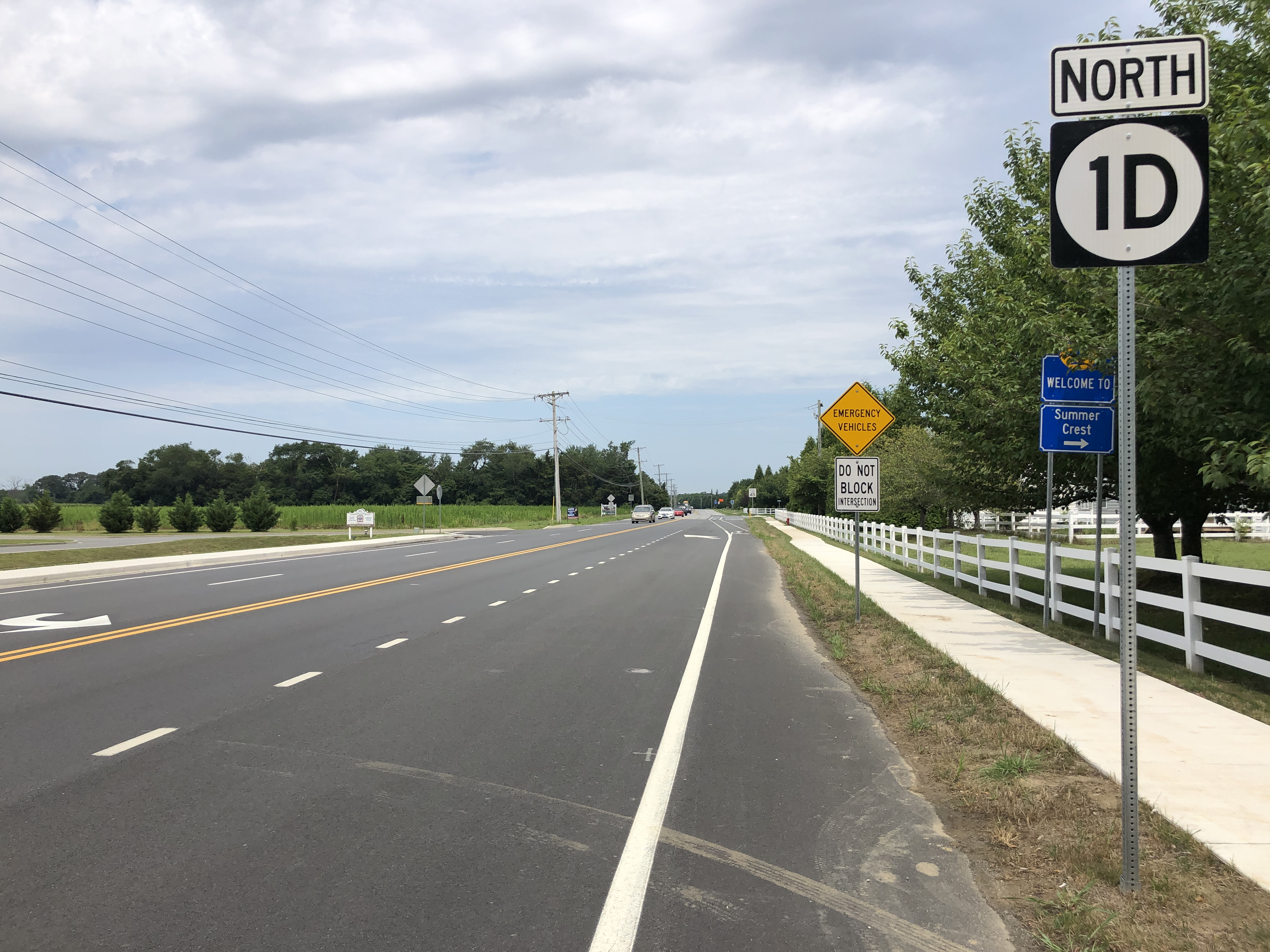
DE 1D northbound past DE 24 in Midway

Delaware Route 1D (DE 1D) is a state highway that is an auxiliary route of DE 1 in Sussex County. The route begins at DE 1 in the community of Midway, where it heads southwest concurrent with DE 24 on four-lane divided John J. Williams Highway, soon becoming undivided. The road passes homes and businesses as it transitions into a five-lane road with a center left-turn lane. DE 1D splits from DE 24 by turning northwest onto two-lane undivided Plantation Road concurrent with DE 24 Alt. The road heads through a mix of farmland and residential development. Upon reaching the Five Points intersection in the community of Nassau, the road curves west, coming to a roundabout with DE 23. At this point, DE 1D ends while the road continues southwest as DE 23 and DE 24 Alt. DE 23 heads north at this point to immediately intersect US 9/DE 404, which head east to provide access to DE 1. Plantation Road serves as an alternate to DE 1, which sees heavy traffic in the summer months.

In 1991, the Five Points intersection was reconfigured to separate the DE 23 and Plantation Road intersection from US 9/DE 404, with a short connector road linking US 9/DE 404 to the two roads. In addition, a jughandle was constructed from eastbound US 9/DE 404 to northbound DE 1. DE 1D was designated by 1996. The portion of the route along Plantation Road became concurrent with DE 24 Alt. by 2006. In 2022, construction began to reconfigure the intersection between US 9/DE 404 and DE 1D/DE 23 that would realign DE 1D and DE 23 to meet at a roundabout and intersect a longer connector road linking to US 9/DE 404 and also build a direct ramp from southbound DE 1 to US 9/DE 404 at the DE 1D/DE 23 intersection. Construction on this project is planned to be finished in 2024. The roundabout at the DE 1D and DE 23 junction opened on April 19, 2024, with the connection between the roundabout and US 9/DE 404 opening on May 16.

Major intersections
The entire route is in Sussex County.

Location	mi	km	Destinations	Notes
Midway	3.92	6.31	DE 1 (Coastal Highway) – Lewes, Rehoboth Beach DE 24 begins	Southern terminus; south end of DE 24 overlap; eastern terminus of DE 24
Midway	3.19	5.13	DE 24 west (John J. Williams Highway) DE 24 Alt. begins	North end of DE 24 overlap; south end of DE 24 Alt. overlap; eastern terminus of DE 24 Alt.
Nassau	0.00	0.00	DE 23 / DE 24 Alt. west (Beaver Dam Road) to US 9 / DE 404 / DE 1	Roundabout; northern terminus; north end of DE 24 Alt. overlap
1.000 mi = 1.609 km; 1.000 km = 0.621 mi: Concurrency terminus

=== DE 1 Business ===
Delaware Route 1 Business
- Location: Milford
- Length: 3.90 mi (6.28 km)
- Existed: 1977–present
- Tourist routes: Delaware Bayshore Byway

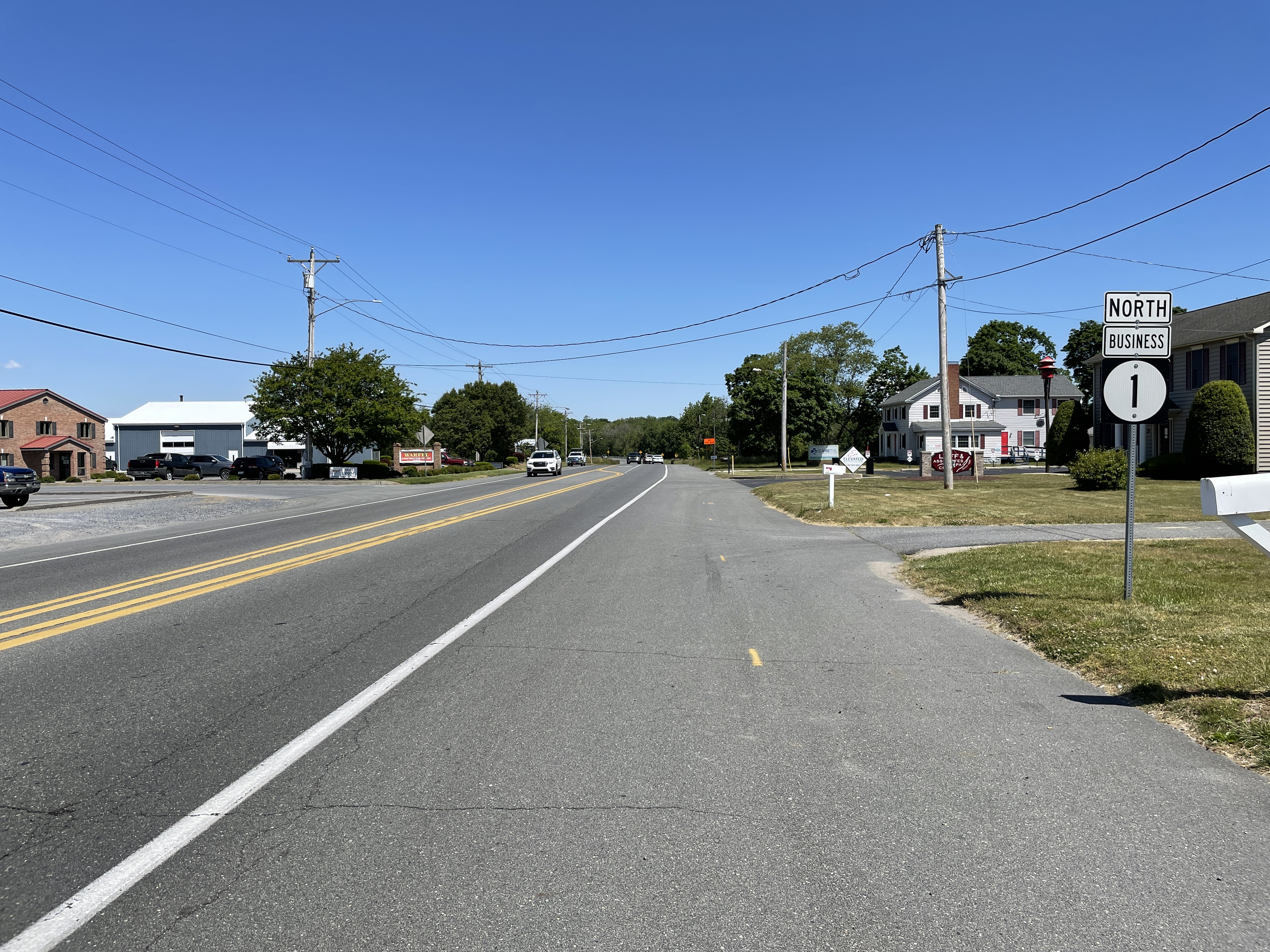
DE 1 Bus. northbound past DE 36 in Milford

Delaware Route 1 Business (DE 1 Bus.) is a business route of DE 1 that runs through the city of Milford. DE 1 Bus. starts at a partial interchange with DE 1 southeast of Milford in Sussex County, with access to southbound DE 1 and from northbound DE 1. At this interchange, the business route intersects the northern terminus of DE 30, with access from southbound DE 1 Bus. to DE 30 and access from DE 30 to northbound DE 1 Bus. From this interchange, the route heads northwest into Milford as two-lane undivided South Rehoboth Boulevard, passing residential subdivisions. The road continues past homes and some businesses, passing to the east of Marshalls Pond before reaching an intersection with DE 36. DE 1 Bus. curves north before it heads northwest into wooded areas and passes over the Mispillion River on a drawbridge, at which point it enters Kent County and becomes North Rehoboth Boulevard. The route continues into business areas and crosses DE 14. The road runs past commercial establishments, heading to the southwest of a Perdue Farms chicken plant, and turns north onto North Walnut Street. DE 1 Bus. passes to the west of Milford High School and heads north to an intersection with US 113, at which point it becomes concurrent with that route on four-lane divided Dupont Boulevard. US 113/DE 1 Bus. continue north for a short distance and end at a partial interchange with DE 1 at the north end of Milford, with access to northbound DE 1 and from southbound DE 1. The section of the route between DE 30 and DE 36 is designated as part of the Delaware Bayshore Byway, a Delaware Byway and National Scenic Byway. DE 1 Bus. has an annual average daily traffic count ranging from a high of 30,038 vehicles along the US 113 concurrency at the northern border of Milford to a low of 3,863 vehicles at the intersection with US 113 along North Walnut Street. The portion of DE 1 Bus. concurrent with US 113 is part of the National Highway System.

What is now DE 1 Bus. south of DE 36 and along North Walnut Street and US 113 was completed as a state highway by 1925. In 1926, suggestions were made to build a bypass east of Milford connecting US 113 (DuPont Boulevard) north of town to the state highway leading from Milford southeast to Rehoboth Beach in order to provide a better route to the beaches and reduce traffic congestion in Milford during the summer months. In 1928, plans were made to build the bypass, which included a drawbridge over the Mispillion River. Construction on the drawbridge was underway in 1929. The bypass to the east of Milford, along with the drawbridge, were completed in 1930. When Delaware designated its state highways by 1936, DE 14 was designated along Rehoboth Boulevard south of Northeast Front Street, where the route turned to the west. The divided Milford Bypass to the east of the city was completed in 1971. In 1977, DE 1 Bus. was designated onto its current alignment, running concurrent with DE 14 southeast of Northeast Front Street. The DE 14 concurrency was removed by 1984 when that route was realigned to follow Northeast Front Street to DE 1.

Major intersections
The entire route is in Milford.

County	mi	km	Destinations	Notes
Sussex	0.00	0.00	DE 1 south (Coastal Highway) – Lewes, Rehoboth Beach	Interchange; access to southbound DE 1 and from northbound DE 1; southern terminus
Sussex			DE 30 south (Cedar Creek Road)	Access to DE 30 in southbound direction and from DE 30 in northbound direction; northern terminus of DE 30
Sussex	1.79	2.88	DE 36 (Southeast Front Street/Cedar Beach Road) to DE 1 – Slaughter Beach	
Kent			DE 14 (Northeast Front Street)	
Kent	3.57	5.75	US 113 south (Dupont Boulevard) – Georgetown	South end of US 113 overlap
Kent	3.90	6.28	DE 1 north (Bay Road) – Dover, Wilmington	Interchange; access to northbound DE 1 and from southbound DE 1; northern terminus; northern terminus of US 113
1.000 mi = 1.609 km; 1.000 km = 0.621 mi: Concurrency terminus; Incomplete access
