= Carpenters Corner, Delaware =

Unincorporated community in Delaware, United States

- Unincorporated community
- Location within Delaware Location within the United States
- Coordinates: 38°44′33″N 75°09′01″W
- Country: United States
- State: Delaware
- County: Sussex
- Elevation: 23 ft (7.0 m)
- Time zone: UTC-5 (Eastern (EST))
  - Summer (DST): UTC-4 (EDT)
- Area code: 302
- GNIS feature ID: 216056

Carpenters Corner, Delaware is a village two miles south of Lewes and four miles northwest of Rehoboth Beach in Sussex County, at 38°44′30″N 75°09′00″W. The village is located on Delaware Route 1, and is named for two prosperous dairy farmers.
