= Little River (Delaware) =

Little River Tributary to Delaware Bay
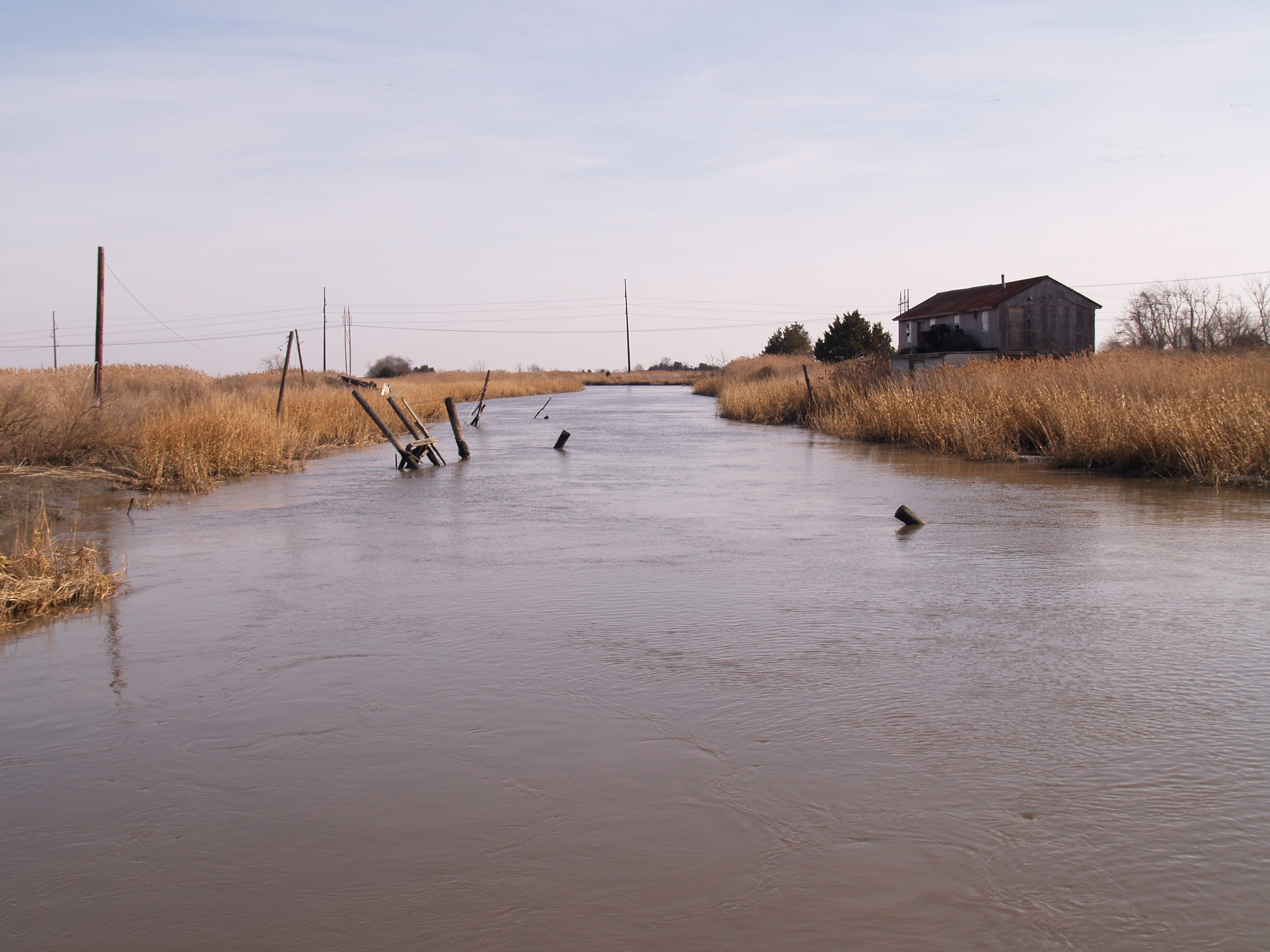
- Little Creek looking downstream (east) from DE 9 bridge in 2008

- Location within Delaware Location within the United States

Location
- Country: United States
- State: Delaware
- County: Kent
- City: Little Creek, Delaware

Physical characteristics
- Source: On the watershed divide between Little Creek and St. Jones River
  - location: Dover, Delaware
  - coordinates: 39°11′37″N 075°31′36″W
  - elevation: 30 ft (9.1 m)
- Mouth: Delaware Bay
  - location: about 2 miles east of Little Creek, Delaware
  - coordinates: 39°09′36″N 075°24′28″W
  - elevation: 0 ft (0 m)
- Length: 8.34 mi (13.42 km)
- Basin size: 13.93 square miles (36.1 km^{2})
- Discharge
  - location: Delaware Bay
  - average: 16.62 cu ft/s (0.471 m^{3}/s) at mouth with Delaware Bay

Basin features
- Progression: northeast
- River system: Delaware Bay
- Tributaries
  - left: unnamed tributaries
  - right: Morgan Branch; Elm Branch
- Bridges: white Oak Road; DE 8 DE 9

The Little River (also called Little Creek) is a river, approximately 8 mi (13 km) long, in central Delaware in the United States.

It rises in central Kent County, approximately 1 mi (1.6 km) northwest of Dover and flows generally east, entering Delaware Bay approximately 6 mi (10 km) east of Dover. The lower 2 mi (3.2 km) of the river is surrounded by extensive tidal wetlands protected as part of the Little Creek Wildlife Area.

== See also ==
- List of Delaware rivers
