= Dodd House =

Dodd House may refer to:

- Dodd Homestead, Rehoboth Beach, Delaware, listed on the National Register of Historic Places (NRHP)
- A. B. C. Dodd House, Charles City, Iowa, NRHP-listed
- Dodd College President's Home, Shreveport, Louisiana, NRHP-listed
- Dodd-Hinsdale House, Raleigh, NC, NRHP-listed
- Dodd--Harkrider House, Abilene, Texas, NRHP-listed
- Dodd House (Spokane, Washington), listed on the NRHP in Spokane County
- Osage Mission Infirmary, St. Paul, Kansas, NRHP-listed

== See also ==
- David O. Dodd Memorial, Little Rock, AR, NRHP-listed
- Thomas J. Dodd Research Center, of University of Connecticut libraries
- Dodds House, of Wright Quadrangle on the Bloomington campus of Indiana University
