= Gelof =

Gelof is a surname. Notable people with this surname include:

- Jake Gelof (born 2002), American baseball player
- Zack Gelof (born 1999), American baseball player, brother of Jake
