= Robert McG. Thomas Jr. =

American journalist

Robert McGill Thomas Jr. (May 9, 1939 – January 6, 2000) was an American journalist. He worked for many years at The New York Times and was best known for the obituaries he wrote for that newspaper.

== Early life ==
Thomas was born in Shelbyville, Tennessee, on May 9, 1939. He was distantly related to Estes Kefauver, a U.S. Senator from Tennessee who was the Democratic candidate for vice president in the 1956 presidential election. Thomas attended Yale University but dropped out and joined the Times as a copyboy in 1959.

== Career ==
Thomas covered a variety of subjects at the New York Times as a reporter, though he gained particular attention for his obituaries. More than thirty of his obituaries were published in the 1997 anthology The Last Word. After his death, a larger collection of Thomas' obituaries was published in 2001 as 52 McGs.: The Best Obituaries from Legendary New York Times Reporter Robert McG. Thomas.

The author of a starred Kirkus Review of 52 McGs wrote, "For the last half of the 1990s, readers of the New York Times could be excused if they searched out Thomas's work before they bothered with the front-page lead. Known as 'McGs.'—after the veteran reporter's middle name—these little beauties celebrated the unsung, the queer, the unpretentious, the low-rent." Michael T. Kaufman, writing in Thomas's own New York Times obituary, said that he "extended the possibilities of the conventional obituary form, shaking the dust from one of the most neglected areas of daily journalism".

== Personal life and death ==
Thomas and his wife, Joan, had twin sons. They lived between Manhattan and a vacation home in Rehoboth Beach, Delaware, where he died from abdominal cancer on January 6, 2000, aged 60.
