= Rehoboth Beach, Delaware =

- City
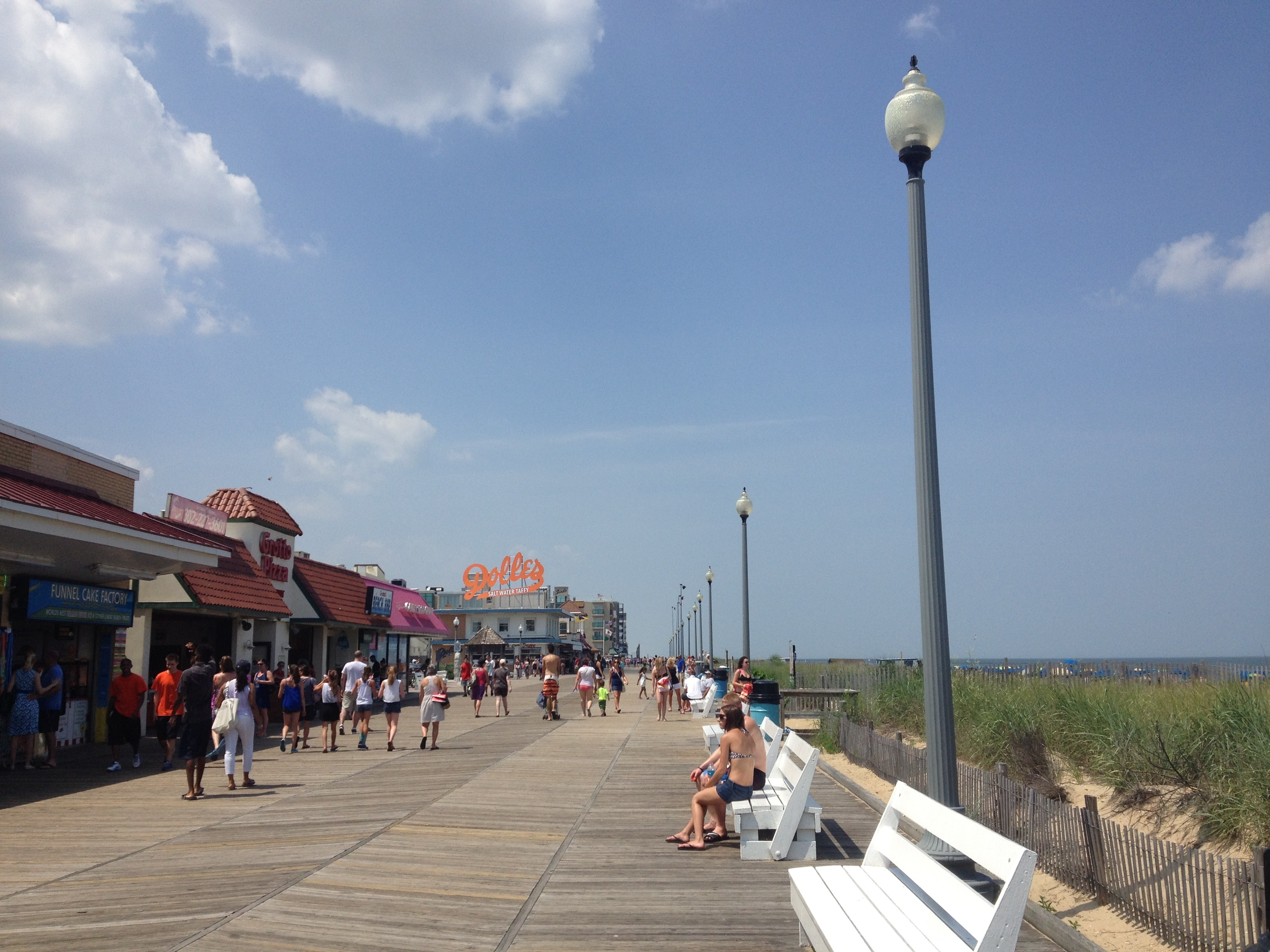
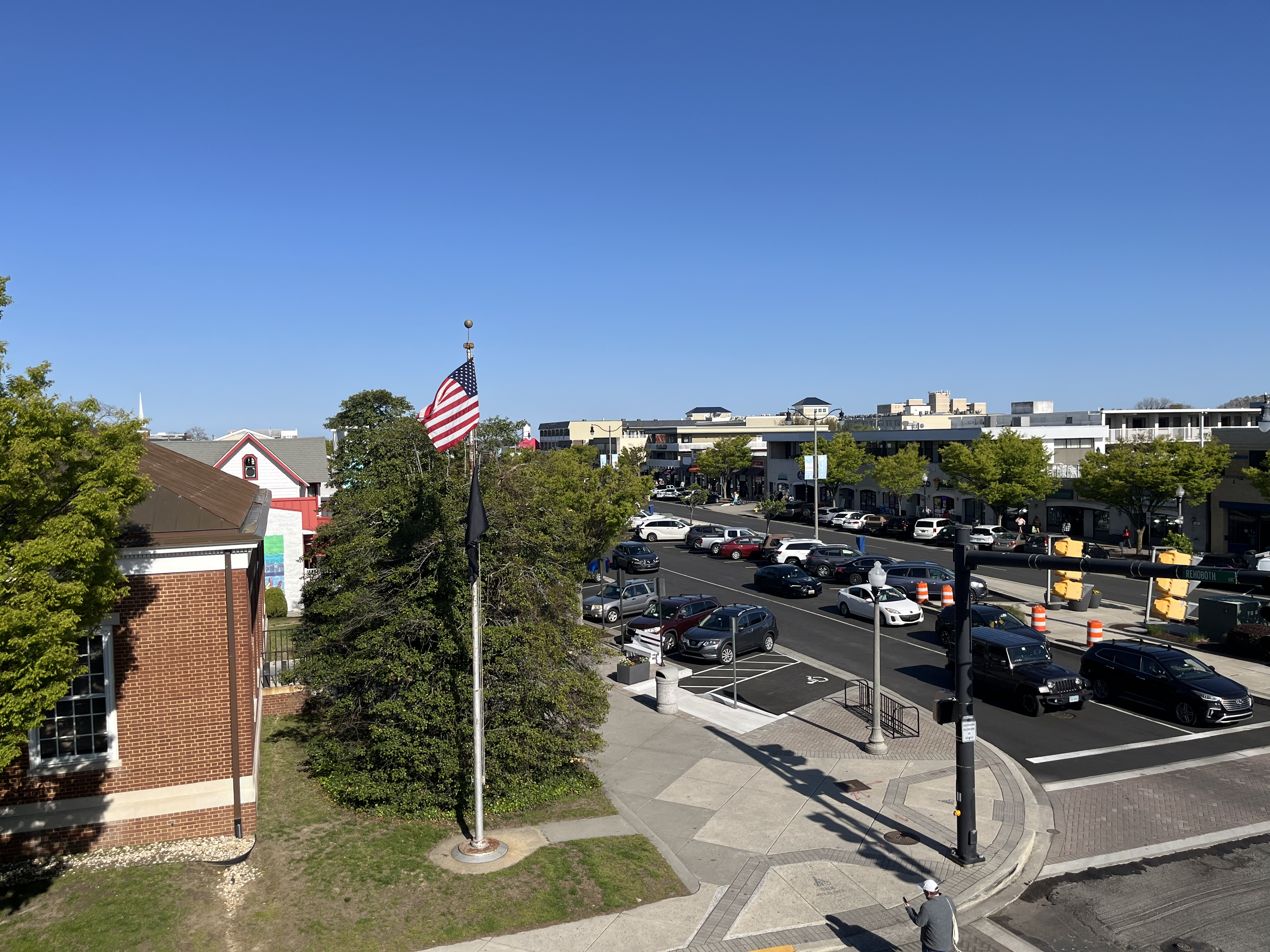
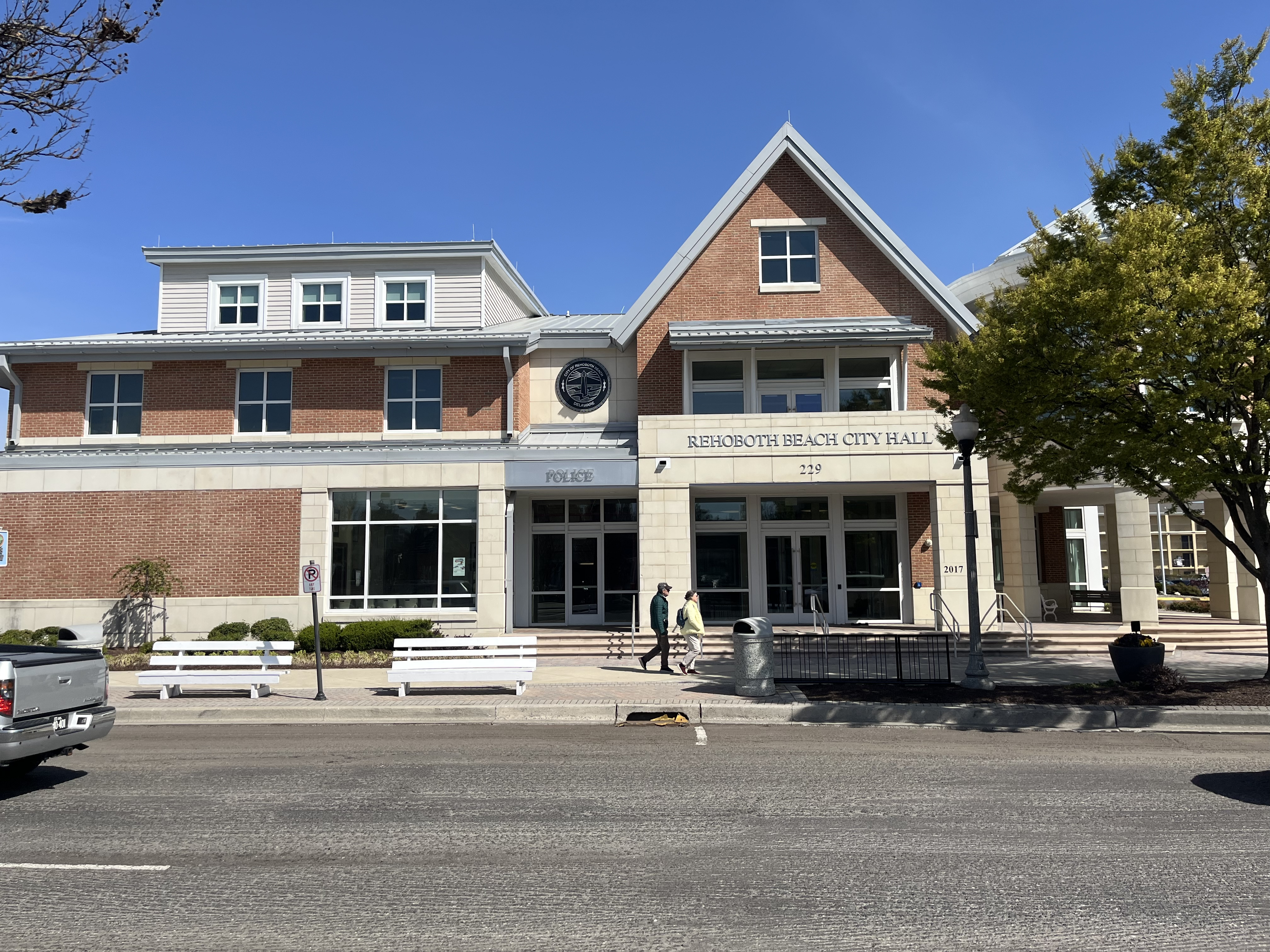
- Rehoboth Beach boardwalk looking north View of the city facing west towards the boardwalk Rehoboth Beach city hall

- Flag Seal
- Nickname: The Nation's Summer Capital
- Location of Rehoboth Beach in Sussex County, Delaware

- Location of Rehoboth Beach in Delaware Rehoboth Beach (the United States)
- Coordinates: 38°43′15″N 75°04′34″W
- Country: United States
- State: Delaware
- County: Sussex
- Founded: 1873
- Incorporated: March 19, 1891

Government
  - Mayor: Susan Stewart (NP)

Area
  - Total: 1.64 sq mi (4.26 km^{2})
  - Land: 1.17 sq mi (3.04 km^{2})
  - Water: 0.47 sq mi (1.22 km^{2})
- Elevation: 7 ft (2.1 m)

Population (2020)
  - Total: 1,108
  - Density: 942.6/sq mi (363.95/km^{2})
- Time zone: UTC−5 (Eastern (EST))
  - Summer (DST): UTC−4 (EDT)
- ZIP Code: 19971
- Area code: 302
- FIPS code: 10-60290
- GNIS feature ID: 214535
- Website: www.rehobothbeachde.gov

Rehoboth Beach (/rəˈhoʊbəθ/ rə-HOH-bəth) is a city on the Atlantic Ocean along the Delaware Beaches in eastern Sussex County, Delaware, United States. As of 2024, its population was 1,370. Along with the neighboring coastal town of Lewes, Rehoboth Beach is one of the principal cities of Delaware's rapidly growing Cape Region. Rehoboth Beach lies within the Salisbury metropolitan area.

As a popular vacation destination, especially for the communities of Washington, D.C., Baltimore, and Philadelphia, Rehoboth has many summer homes, including one owned by the 46th U.S. President Joe Biden. During the summer season, Rehoboth's population expands to over 25,000 within the city limits, and thousands more in the surrounding area.

In 2011, the NRDC awarded Rehoboth Beach with a 5-Star rating in water quality. This award was given to 12 other locations, one being neighboring Dewey Beach. Out of the 30 states with coastline, the Delaware Beaches ranked number one for water quality in 2011.

== History ==
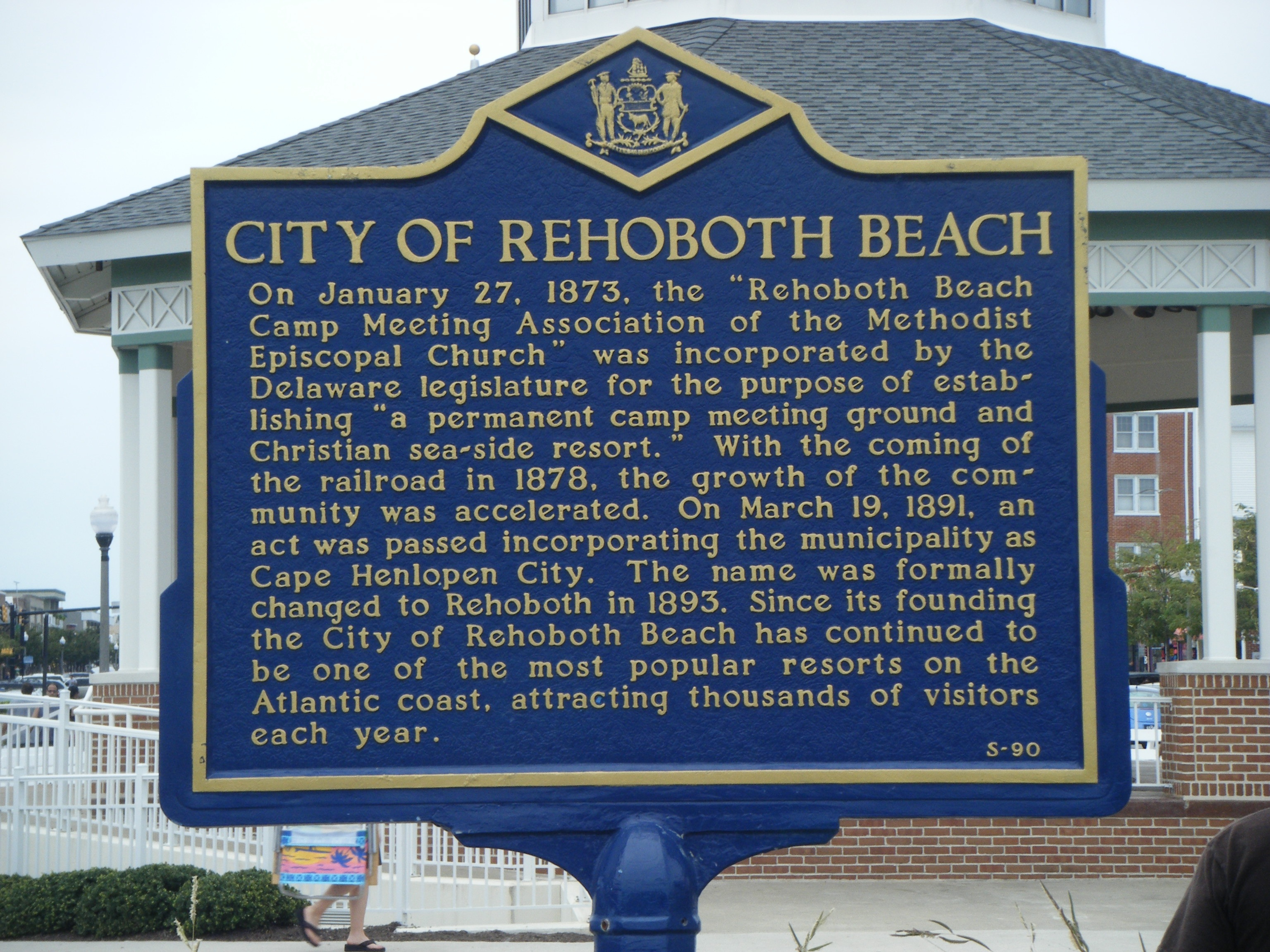
Historical marker of Rehoboth Beach's history, located in Rehoboth Beach

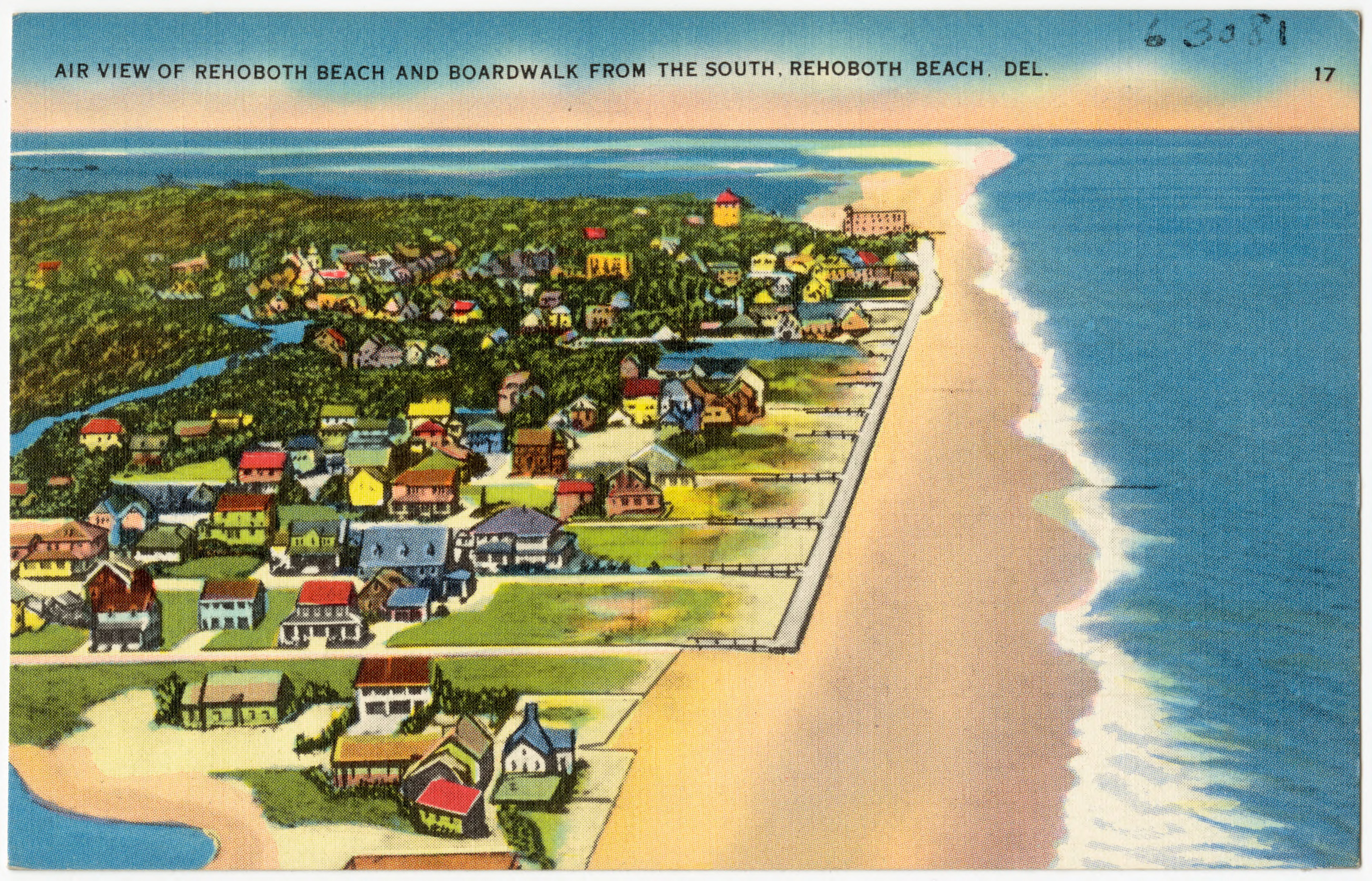
Rehoboth Beach in the 1930s

=== Colonial era ===
By the time the first Europeans arrived in the area in the 17th century, the coastline was at its present location and several Native American Indian tribes lived in the area, including the Lenape, the Sikkonese, the Assateagues, and the Nanticoke. The site was the location of what may have been the most important Native American fishing village on the Middle Atlantic coast, including at Wilgus Site, a prehistoric shell midden archeological location, which is now inundated.

Pressure from English and Dutch settlers radiating outward from Cape Henlopen near Lewes, Delaware at the entrance to Delaware Bay forced the Lenape to migrate to upper New York state, eastern Canada, and eventually to the west in Indian Territory (later formed Oklahoma, Kansas, parts of Arkansas) while the Sikkonese and Assateagues were extirpated; the Nanticoke, however, still exist in the general area today.

The land later came under the control of the Duke of York, younger brother of King Charles II who also seized and occupied in 1664 the Dutch colony further north at the mouth of the Hudson River on Manhattan Island and adjacent Long Island as New Netherland with Fort Amsterdam and the village of New Amsterdam followed by the previous Swedish colony on the upper Delaware River at Fort Christina and New Sweden, which the Dutch attacked and occupied several years earlier. These later became part of the English and later British America colonies/provinces of New York state and New York town along with renamed Wilmington and New Castle along the Delaware River as part of the colonial Province of Pennsylvania and later in the future state of Delaware. Later, the Duke granted holdings to various landholders who endured into the 18th century, and ultimately ascended to the English throne as King James II of England and also James VII of Scotland.

Rehoboth (Hebrew: רְחוֹבוֹת) means "broad spaces". It appears three times in the Old Testament as a place name—a well dug by Isaac (at modern Wadi er-Ruheibeh) (Genesis 26:22), a city on the Euphrates River (Genesis 36:37; I Chronicles 1:48), and one of the cities of Asshur (Genesis 10:11) in Mesopotamia (modern Iraq). Hence the name may have had a special appeal for the religious founders of the city, although the adjacent bay had already borne the name Rehoboth for at least a century before the town was founded.

=== 19th century ===
By the mid-19th century, the descendants of these landholders were farmers attempting to make a living off the relatively poor sandy infertile land. The town was founded in 1873 as the Rehoboth Beach Camp Meeting Association by the Rev. Robert W. Todd, of St. Paul's Methodist Episcopal Church of Wilmington, Delaware, as a site for Methodist Episcopal Church camp meetings in the spirit of similar resorts further north on the New Jersey shore, such as Ocean Grove. The Camp Meeting Association disbanded in 1881, and in 1891, the location was incorporated by the General Assembly of Delaware (state legislature) as "Cape Henlopen City". In 1893, it was renamed to Rehoboth Beach.

The first boardwalk in Rehoboth Beach was constructed in 1873 and has seen changes in configuration from weather and storms over the years. The Junction and Breakwater Railroad constructed a line from Lewes south to Rehoboth Beach in 1878, running down the center of today's Rehoboth Avenue. The arrival of the railroad allowed visitors to come in from northern Delaware and Pennsylvania and its cities and towns, leading to the beginning of Rehoboth Beach as a tourist destination. After the railroad came to Rehoboth Beach, the center of camp meetings and city life moved to nearby Baltimore Avenue. The original Henlopen Hotel opened in 1879, being replaced with another hotel of the same name on the current site.

=== 20th century ===
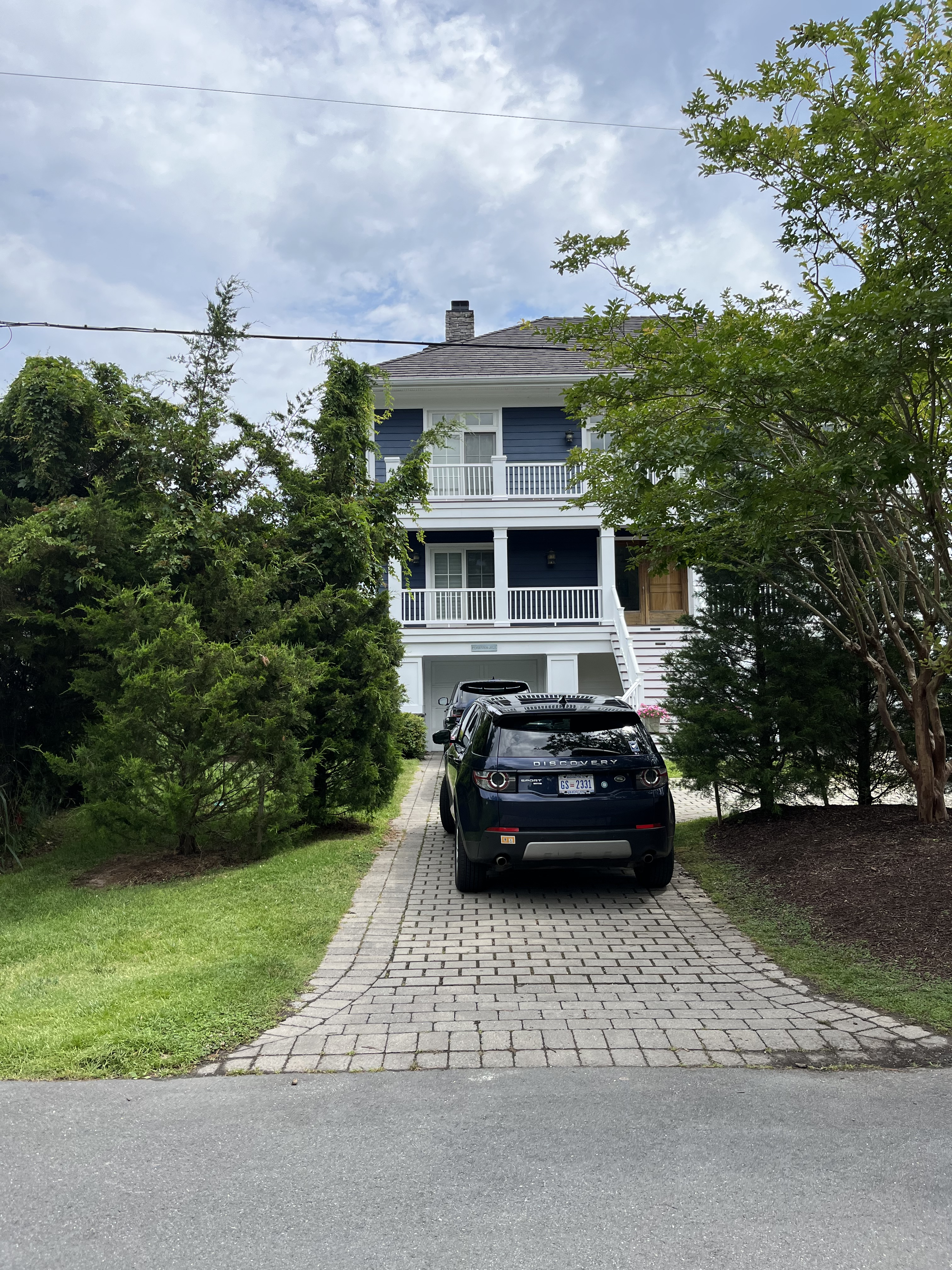
The beach house of U.S. President Joe Biden and First Lady Jill Biden in the North Shores neighborhood outside the corporate limits of Rehoboth Beach, which served as their Summer White House.

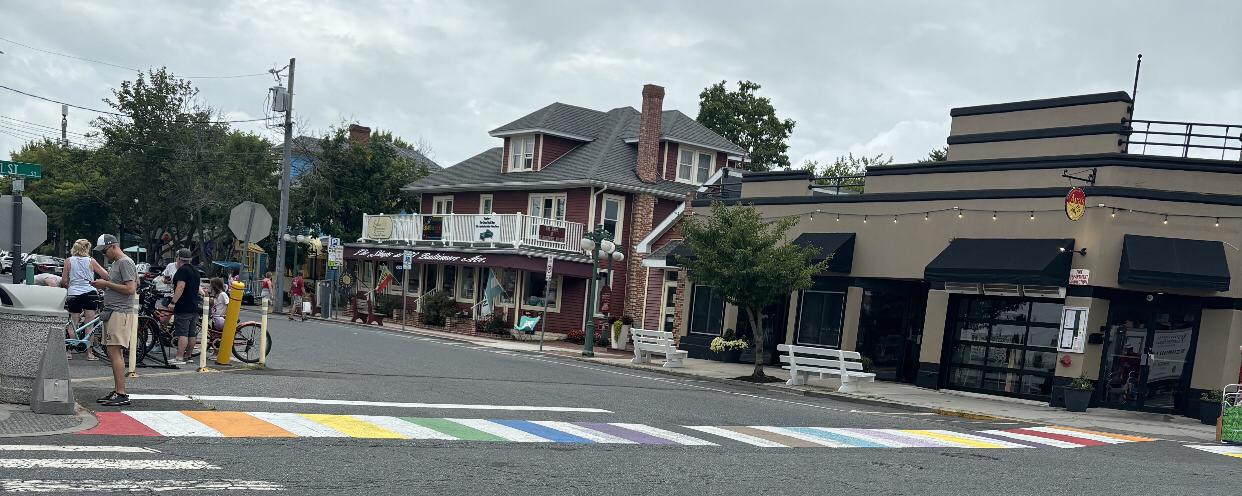
A rainbow crossing in Rehoboth Beach, meant to celebrate the LGBT community.

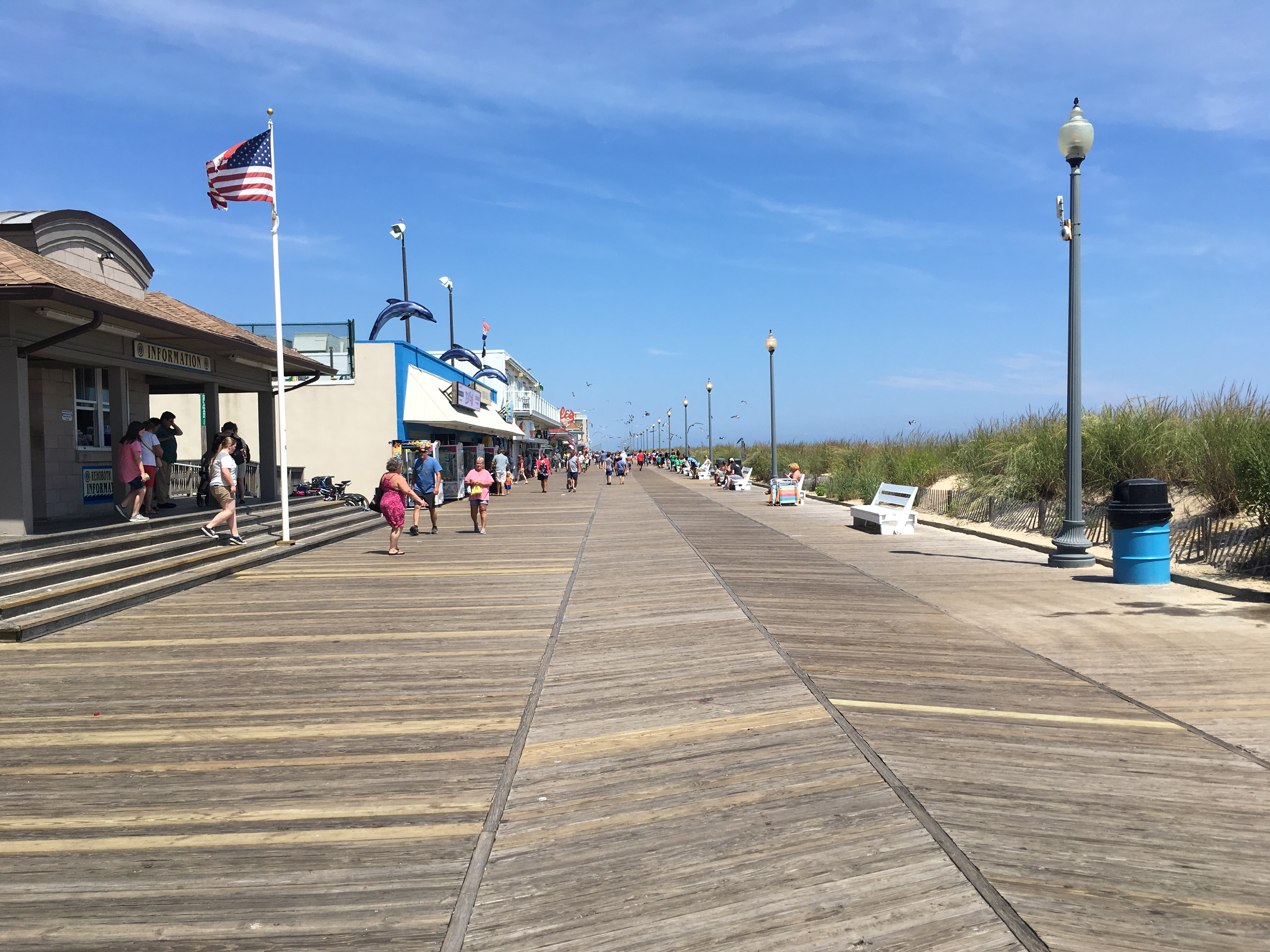
Rehoboth Beach boardwalk looking north at Delaware Avenue

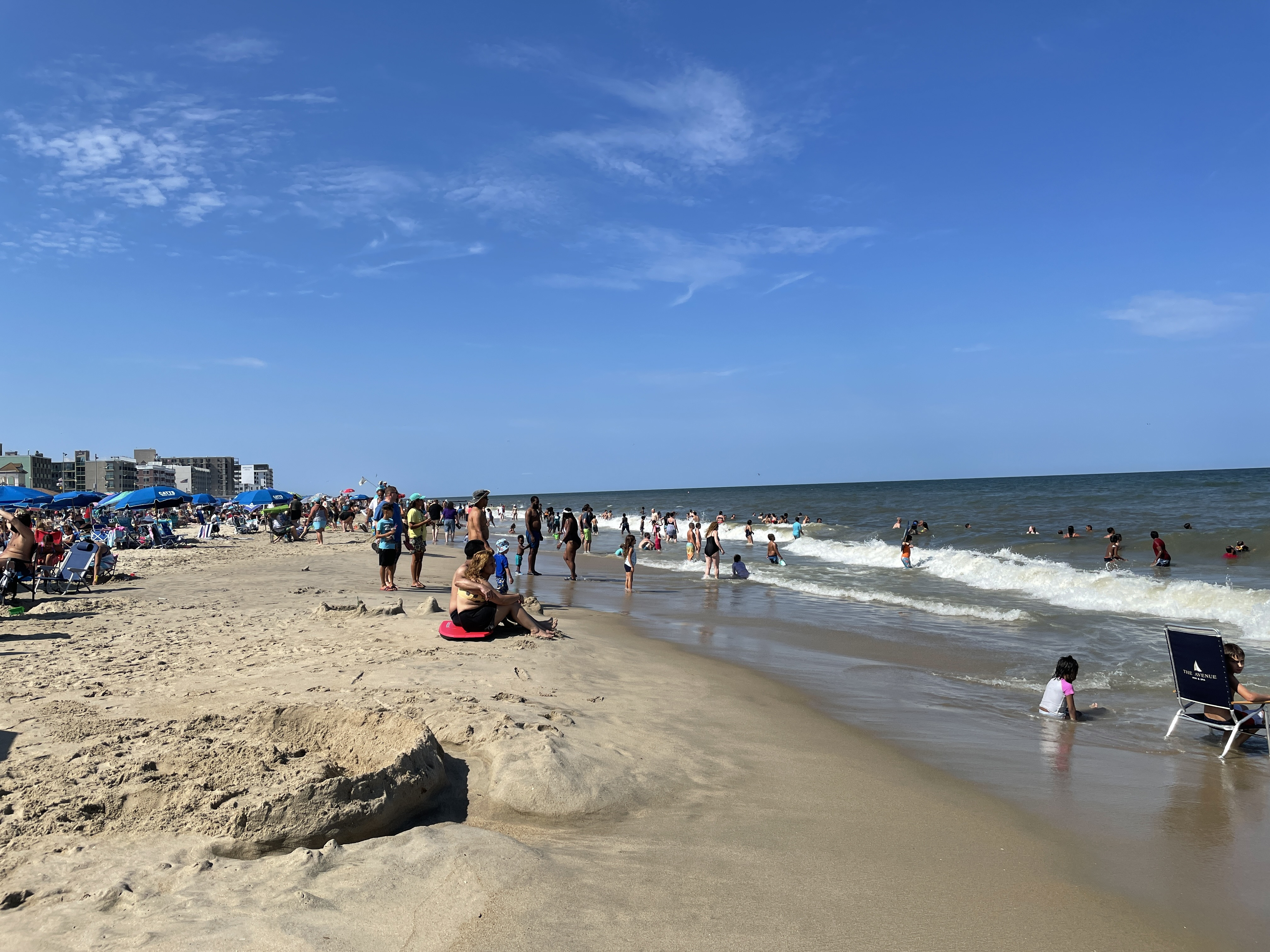
Rehoboth Beach looking north at Delaware Avenue

A paved highway was built by the state between Georgetown and Rehoboth Beach in 1925, which helped bring in travelers from the west in the metropolitan areas of Washington, D.C.; Baltimore; other parts of Maryland; and Northern Virginia.

Just north of the town in Cape Henlopen State Park, multiple submarine monitoring towers can be seen from the beach. These towers were constructed by the military after the onset of WWII. The towers would watch for submarines attempting to enter Delaware Bay. They would triangulate the submarines position for nearby artillery batteries at Fort Miles. After the war these towers remained in operation to guard against possible Soviet submarines.

In 1986 tower 9 was renovated to monitor flight traffic around Delaware Bay. The tower is still used to communicate with commercial shipping.

From 1942 to 1943, Rehoboth Beach Airport, which closed in 1987, served as a base, designated as Coastal Patrol Base 2, for volunteers with the Civil Air Patrol, who flew aerial patrols using civilian aircraft in support of Army and Navy anti-submarine operations during the Battle of the Atlantic. Two CAP airmen, Captain Hugh R. Sharp of Greenville, Delaware, and First Lieutenant Edmond Edwards of Newark, Delaware, would go on to be the first civilians to receive the Air Medal after a search and rescue mission on July 21, 1942, where they rescued one crewmember of another CAP aircraft which crashed at sea.

Rehoboth Beach Airport shut down in 1987 and Rehoboth Shores Estates Community now stands on the former grounds. The Delaware Public Archives placed a historical marker on the site of the former airport commemorating Coastal Patrol Base 2 in 2006.

=== 21st century ===
Avery's Rest Site, Dodd Homestead, Peter Marsh House, Thompson's Loss and Gain Site, Thompsons Island Site, Warrington Site, and Woman's Christian Temperance Union Fountain are listed on the National Register of Historic Places, maintained by the National Park Service of the United States Department of the Interior.

The town often bills itself as "The Nation's Summer Capital" because it is a frequent summer vacation destination for Washington, D.C., residents as well as visitors from Maryland, Virginia, and Pennsylvania. Vacationers are drawn for many reasons, including the town's charm and the absence of a sales tax in Delaware. The Rehoboth Beach Boardwalk is a 1-mile (1.6 km) long wooden boardwalk adjacent to the beach with restaurants, shops, amusements, and attractions. The Funland amusement park, which opened in 1962, is located along the boardwalk between Delaware and Brooklyn avenues. Several restaurants and shops are located along the town's main street, Rehoboth Avenue. Outside of Rehoboth Beach along Delaware Route 1, are the Tanger Outlets, which operate three locations along the highway with over 130 outlet stores.

Due to its proximity to Washington, D.C., Rehoboth Beach is a popular summer destination among members of the United States Congress. Joe Biden, the 46th President of the United States, and First Lady of the United States, Jill Biden, have a beach house outside the corporate limits of Rehoboth Beach in the North Shores neighborhood. This beach house served as their "Summer White House".

Rehoboth Beach has a seasonal beach patrol who are in charge of lifeguarding the one and a half miles that make up the town's beachfront. They operate from Memorial Day weekend into the following fall season. The beach patrol is on duty every day between Memorial Day until Labor Day from 10 am until 5 pm on weekdays, and 10 am until 5:30 pm on weekends.

Rehoboth Beach is also known as one of the mid-Atlantic coast's popular LGBT-friendly getaways. LGBT tourists have been visiting and residing in the town for generations; however, the movement toward becoming gay-friendly began with the town's culinary renaissance in the 1980s. The visible presence of more LGBT people during this era and the resulting community backlash coincided with the national AIDS crisis and the Moral Majority. During the 1990s, a coterie of gay and lesbian activists challenged the town's anti-gay policies and sentiments to Create A More Positive Rehoboth (CAMP). Through this organization's efforts as well as that of other groups, two openly gay town commissioners were elected in the following decade and the town's position on LGBT issues changed. Today, there are a large number of LGBT-owned and operated businesses, and LGBT people are well-represented in town governance. Susan Stewart was elected as the first openly gay mayor of Rehoboth Beach in 2026. Summer activities include going to the LGBT-frequented stretch of beach near Queen Street at the south end of the boardwalk, known as Poodle Beach. Poodle Beach tends to attract gay men, while North Shore Beach within Cape Henlopen State Park tends to attract lesbians.

The Rehoboth Beach Bandstand is located on Rehoboth Avenue near the boardwalk and serves as a free open-air music and entertainment venue in the summer months, with performances from over 50 bands during the season. Performances have been held at the Rehoboth Beach Bandstand since 1963.

Reader's Digest named the Rehoboth Beach Boardwalk as "Best of America" and featured it in the May 2006 issue. Additionally, AARP has named Rehoboth Beach as one of five dream towns as "Best Places to Retire".

The town has several festivals including the Sea Witch Festival, the Rehoboth Beach Independent Film Festival, and the Rehoboth Beach Autumn Jazz Festival every year.

The Clear Space Theatre Company, a professional theater company, offers a year-round schedule of musical and dramatic productions in the Rehoboth Theatre of the Arts.

Dogfish Head Brewery's original brewpub is located on the town's main strip Rehoboth Avenue. The location has grown in years as a popular destination for American craft beer enthusiasts. Grotto Pizza was founded in Rehoboth Beach in 1960 and has grown to 23 locations throughout the state of Delaware along with parts of Maryland and Pennsylvania.

The restaurant scene in Rehoboth Beach was traditionally centered in the downtown area, which remains competitive. In the 21st century, a restaurant scene has begun to develop along the Delaware Route 1 corridor, where parking is more available and accessible.

In 2011, the city passed a smoking ban covering parks and playgrounds, but sparing the beach and boardwalk. The smoking ban was extended to the beach, boardwalk, and adjacent public areas in 2014. In 2017, the city implemented a ban on tents, canopies, and large umbrellas on the beach, the first such ban in Delaware.

March 2024 parking and permit fees were raised to address budget concerns and rising costs. Metered parking is now $4 per hour.

In May 2025, a curfew was implemented for individuals under 18, restricting them from public places between 11 p.m. and 5 a.m. unless with a parent or guardian. This measure aims to address issues involving large groups of minors late at night.

== Geography ==
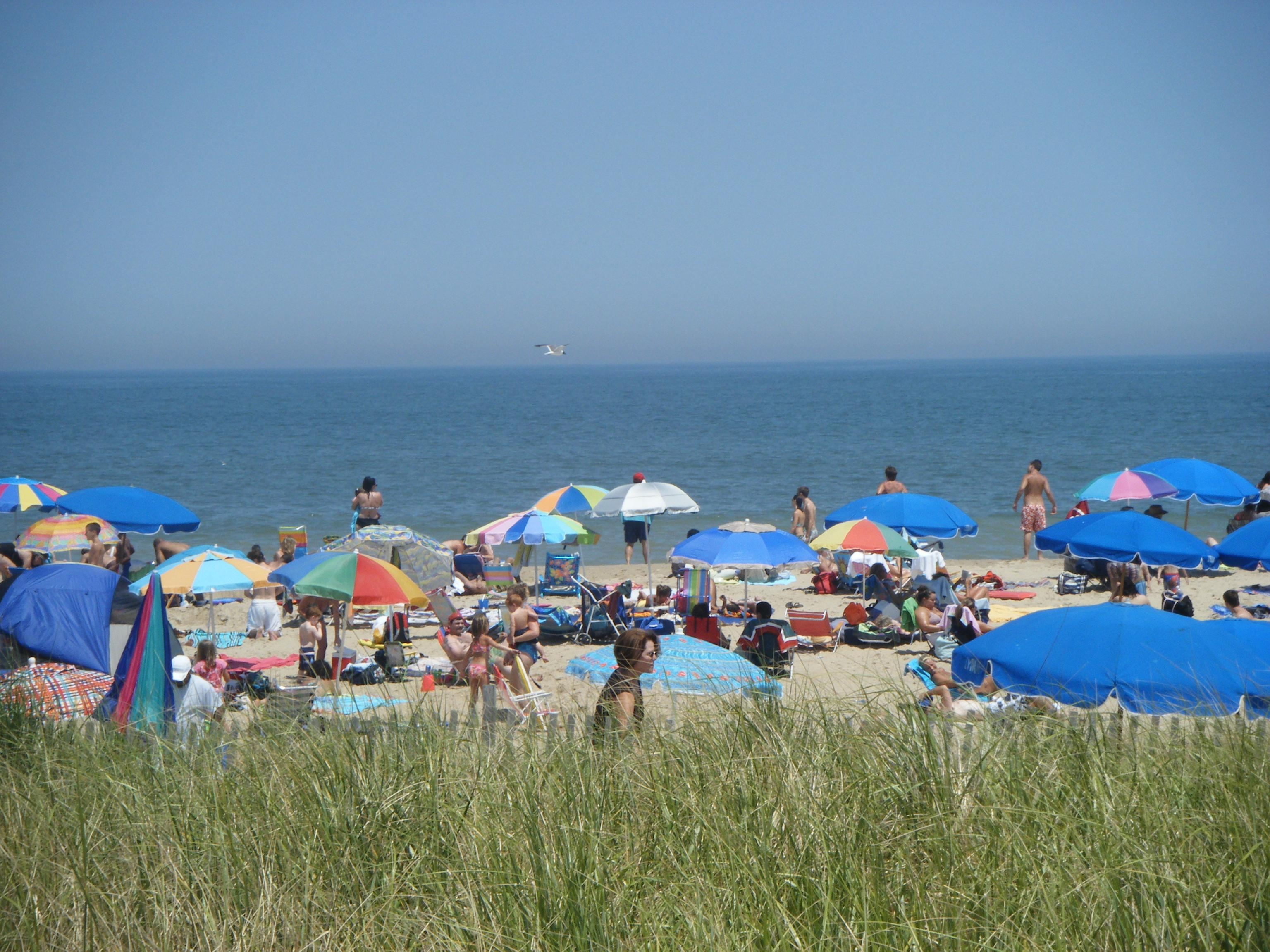
A view of the beach at Delaware Avenue

According to the United States Census Bureau, the city has a total area of 1.6 square miles (4.1 km^{2}), of which 1.2 square miles (3.1 km^{2}) is land and 0.5 square miles (1.3 km^{2}) (28.48%) is water. Rehoboth Beach is bordered on the east by the Atlantic Ocean, on the north by the town of Henlopen Acres, and on the west and south by unincorporated portions of Sussex County. Cape Henlopen State Park lies just to the north of Rehoboth Beach, and Dewey Beach is just to its south.

== Climate ==
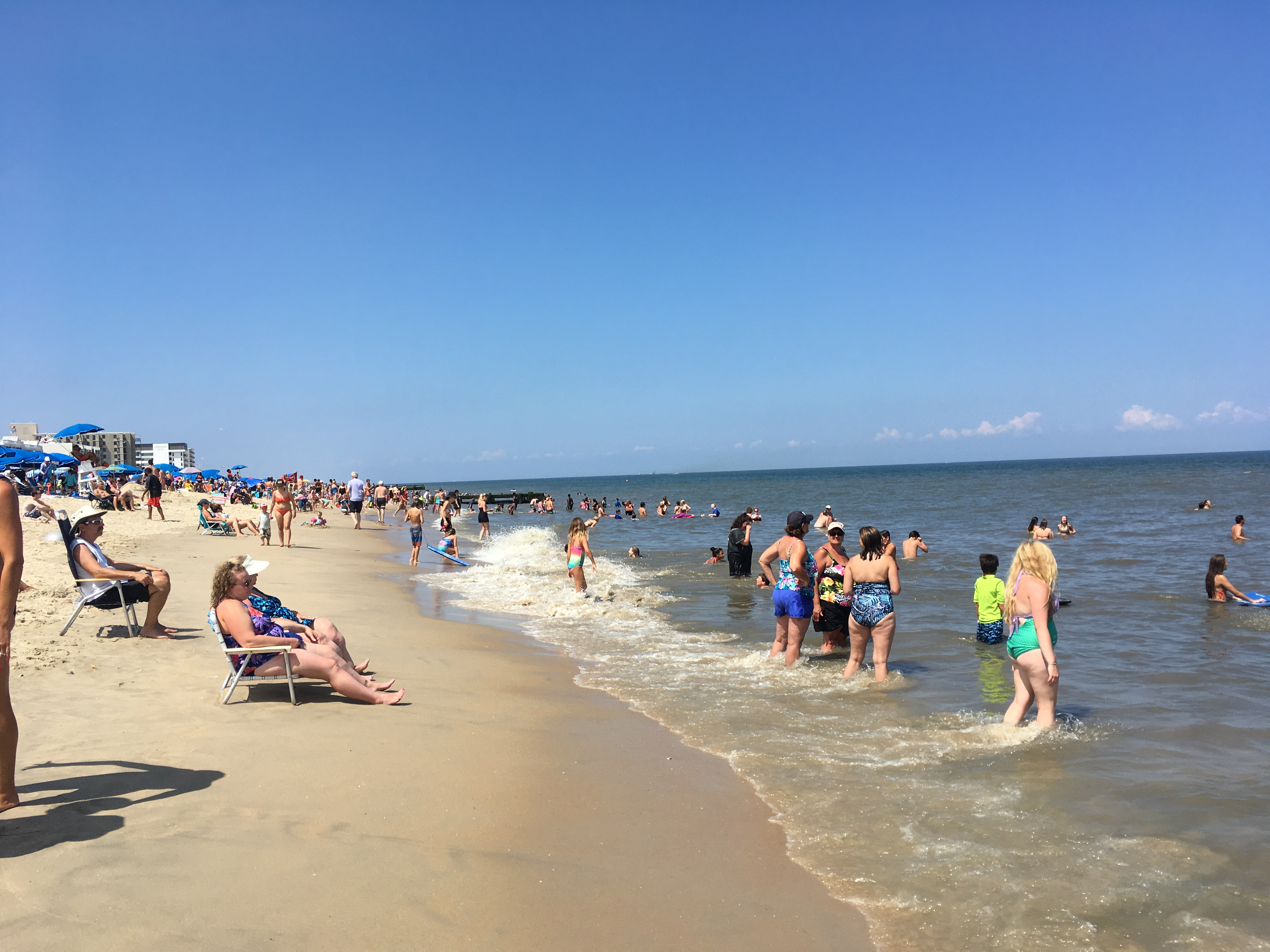
Rehoboth Beach looking north at Wilmington Avenue

Situated on the Atlantic Coastal Plain, Rehoboth Beach's climate is moderated by the Atlantic Ocean and the Rehoboth Bay. According to both the Köppen climate classification and Trewartha climate classification systems, Rehoboth Beach has a humid subtropical climate with hot and moderately humid summers, cool winters and year-around precipitation (Köppen: Cfa, Trewartha: Cfak). During the summer months in Rehoboth Beach, a cooling afternoon sea breeze is present on most days, but episodes of extreme heat and humidity can occur with heat index values ≥ 100 °F (≥ 38 °C).

The highest air temperature ever recorded in Rehoboth Beach was 102 °F (39 °C) on June 21, 1997. During the winter months, episodes of extreme cold and wind can occur with wind chill values < 0 °F (< -18 °C). The plant hardiness zone in Rehoboth Beach is 7b with an average annual extreme minimum air temperature of 8.1 °F (−13.3 °C). The lowest temperature ever recorded in Rehoboth Beach was −11 °F (−24 °C) on January 17, 1982. The average seasonal (Nov–Apr) snowfall total is 6 to 12 inches (15 to 30 centimetres) and the average snowiest month is February which corresponds with the annual peak in nor'easter activity. Large amounts of snowfall are infrequent, but recent significant snowstorms include 10 inches (25 cm) of snowfall on February 24, 1989, 18 inches (46 cm) of snowfall on February 3, 1996, and 16 inches (41 cm) of snowfall on December 26, 2010.

Climate data for Rehoboth Beach, DE (1981–2010 Averages)
Month	Jan	Feb	Mar	Apr	May	Jun	Jul	Aug	Sep	Oct	Nov	Dec	Year
Record high °F (°C)	78 (26)	86 (30)	89 (32)	92 (33)	97 (36)	102 (39)	101 (38)	101 (38)	98 (37)	92 (33)	88 (31)	77 (25)	102 (39)
Mean daily maximum °F (°C)	43.5 (6.4)	45.3 (7.4)	52.4 (11.3)	62.3 (16.8)	71.5 (21.9)	81.0 (27.2)	85.2 (29.6)	83.6 (28.7)	78.0 (25.6)	68.0 (20.0)	57.9 (14.4)	47.9 (8.8)	64.8 (18.2)
Daily mean °F (°C)	36.3 (2.4)	37.9 (3.3)	44.5 (6.9)	54.0 (12.2)	63.1 (17.3)	72.8 (22.7)	77.5 (25.3)	75.9 (24.4)	70.1 (21.2)	59.6 (15.3)	50.0 (10.0)	40.7 (4.8)	57.0 (13.9)
Mean daily minimum °F (°C)	29.1 (−1.6)	30.4 (−0.9)	36.7 (2.6)	45.7 (7.6)	54.7 (12.6)	64.5 (18.1)	69.7 (20.9)	68.2 (20.1)	62.3 (16.8)	51.2 (10.7)	42.1 (5.6)	33.4 (0.8)	49.1 (9.5)
Record low °F (°C)	−11 (−24)	0 (−18)	9 (−13)	18 (−8)	32 (0)	40 (4)	47 (8)	47 (8)	37 (3)	26 (−3)	16 (−9)	0 (−18)	−11 (−24)
Average precipitation inches (mm)	3.58 (91)	2.99 (76)	4.17 (106)	3.61 (92)	3.69 (94)	3.31 (84)	4.43 (113)	4.65 (118)	3.86 (98)	3.68 (93)	3.57 (91)	3.79 (96)	45.33 (1,151)
Average snowfall inches (cm)	2.8 (7.1)	4.5 (11)	0.8 (2.0)	0 (0)	0 (0)	0 (0)	0 (0)	0 (0)	0 (0)	0 (0)	0.2 (0.51)	1.3 (3.3)	9.6 (23.91)
Average relative humidity (%)	68.7	67.2	64.3	63.5	68.1	71.1	71.1	73.7	71.9	70.2	69.2	68.4	69.0
Average dew point °F (°C)	27.0 (−2.8)	28.0 (−2.2)	33.2 (0.7)	41.9 (5.5)	52.4 (11.3)	62.9 (17.2)	67.4 (19.7)	66.9 (19.4)	60.6 (15.9)	49.9 (9.9)	40.3 (4.6)	31.1 (−0.5)	46.9 (8.3)
Source 1: The Weather Channel
Source 2: PRISM

Climate data for Lewes, DE Ocean Water Temperature (5 NW Rehoboth Beach)
Month	Jan	Feb	Mar	Apr	May	Jun	Jul	Aug	Sep	Oct	Nov	Dec	Year
Daily mean °F (°C)	37 (3)	36 (2)	41 (5)	51 (11)	60 (16)	68 (20)	73 (23)	76 (24)	72 (22)	62 (17)	52 (11)	44 (7)	56 (13)
Source: NOAA

== Ecology ==
According to the A. W. Kuchler U.S. potential natural vegetation types, Rehoboth Beach, Delaware has a dominant vegetation type of Oak/Hickory/Pine (111) with a dominant vegetation form of Southern Mixed Forest (26).

== Demographics ==
Historical population
Census	Pop.	Note	%±
1900	198		—
1910	327		65.2%
1920	389		19.0%
1930	795		104.4%
1940	1,247		56.9%
1950	1,794		43.9%
1960	1,507		−16.0%
1970	1,495		−0.8%
1980	1,730		15.7%
1990	1,234		−28.7%
2000	1,495		21.2%
2010	1,327		−11.2%
2020	1,108		−16.5%
U.S. Decennial Census

=== 2020 census ===
As of the 2020 census, Rehoboth Beach had a population of 1,108. The median age was 64.3 years. 5.1% of residents were under the age of 18 and 47.3% of residents were 65 years of age or older. For every 100 females there were 110.6 males, and for every 100 females age 18 and over there were 111.9 males age 18 and over.

100.0% of residents lived in urban areas, while 0.0% lived in rural areas.

There were 624 households in Rehoboth Beach, of which 5.6% had children under the age of 18 living in them. Of all households, 43.6% were married-couple households, 22.9% were households with a male householder and no spouse or partner present, and 26.9% were households with a female householder and no spouse or partner present. About 42.3% of all households were made up of individuals and 21.4% had someone living alone who was 65 years of age or older.

There were 3,081 housing units, of which 79.7% were vacant. The homeowner vacancy rate was 4.0% and the rental vacancy rate was 66.8%.

Racial composition as of the 2020 census
Race	Number	Percent
White	1,039	93.8%
Black or African American	8	0.7%
American Indian and Alaska Native	0	0.0%
Asian	14	1.3%
Native Hawaiian and Other Pacific Islander	1	0.1%
Some other race	10	0.9%
Two or more races	36	3.2%
Hispanic or Latino (of any race)	34	3.1%

=== Demographic estimates ===
As of the U.S. Census Bureau 2021 estimate, the population density was 1,266.5 inhabitants per square mile (489.0/km^{2}), and the average housing-unit density was 2,682.9 units per square mile (1,035.9 units/km^{2}).

The average household size was 1.76 and the average family size was 2.04.

=== Income and poverty ===
The median income for a household in the city was $43,194 and the median income for a family was $255,755.00. Males had a median income of $83,750 versus $27,447 for females. The per capita income for the city was $140,284.00. About 1.42% of families and 2.44% of the population were below the poverty line, including 8.82% of those under age 18 and 2.2% of those age 65 or over.

== Government ==
Rehoboth Beach is governed by a mayor and a city manager. As of 2024, the mayor is Stan Mills and the city manager is Taylour Tedder. There are several departments, city boards, commissions, and committees that oversee the daily functions of the city government. Some of these officials are elected while others are appointed.

Police services in Rehoboth Beach are provided by the Rehoboth Beach Police Department, which consists of 17 full-time officers and nine full-time dispatchers, along with additional seasonal police officers in the peak summer months. Fire protection to Rehoboth Beach and nearby areas is provided by the Rehoboth Beach Volunteer Fire Company, which maintains three stations.

== Parks and recreation ==
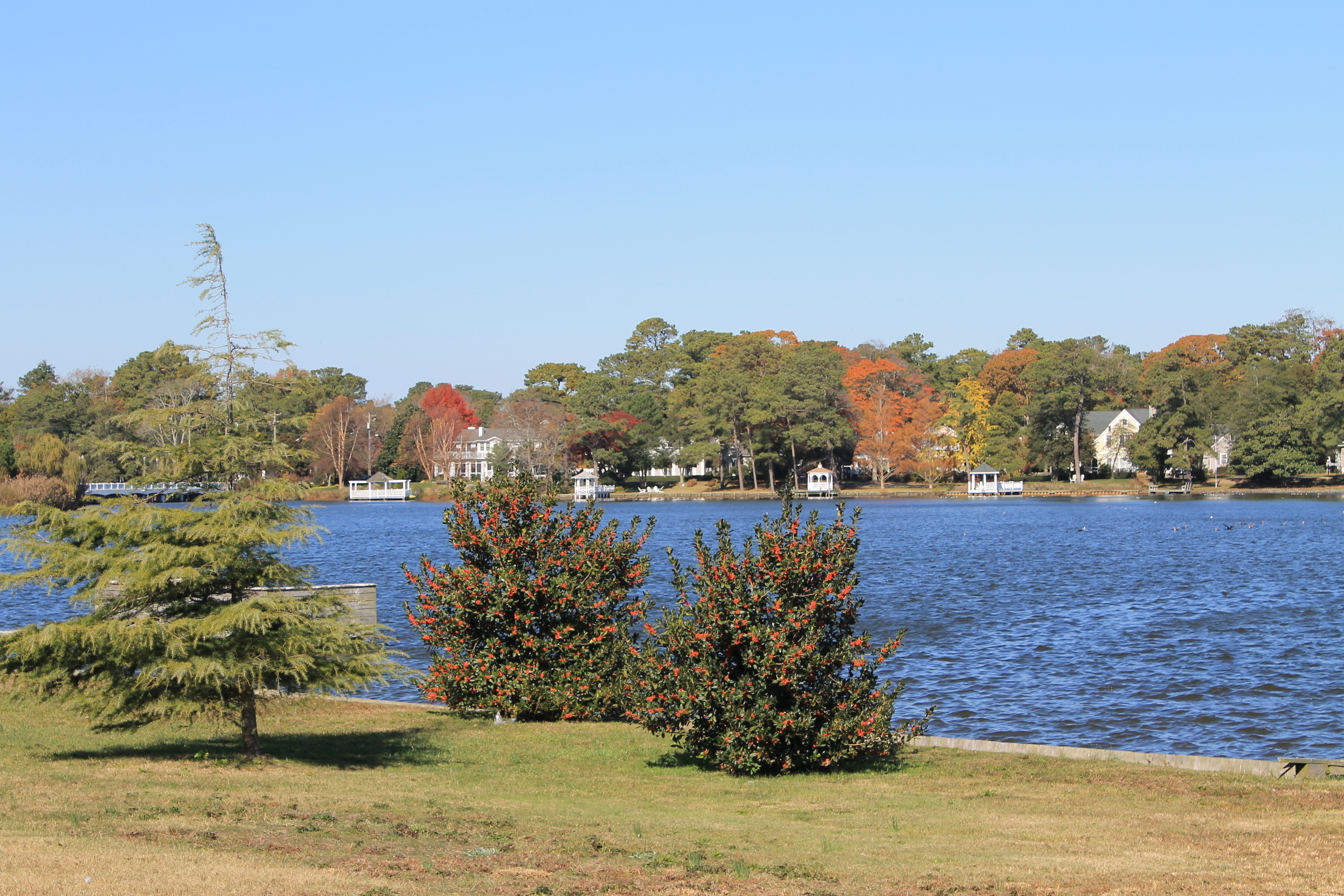
Silver Lake

In addition to beaches along the Atlantic Ocean, there are several parks located in Rehoboth Beach. Grove Park is home to a playground, pavilion, restrooms, and benches. Stockley Street Park is located along Silver Lake and has benches and a playground. Teardrop Park offers a dock along Silver Lake. Lake Gerar Park is located along Lake Gerar and has benches and a playground. There are tennis courts that are located at Deauville Beach. Deer Park and Central Park offer wooded areas that allow for wildlife viewing. Lee Street Park offers trees for shade. Martin's Lawn, located near the Anna Hazzard Museum and the Senior Center, offers a grassy area and trees.

== Infrastructure ==
=== Transportation ===
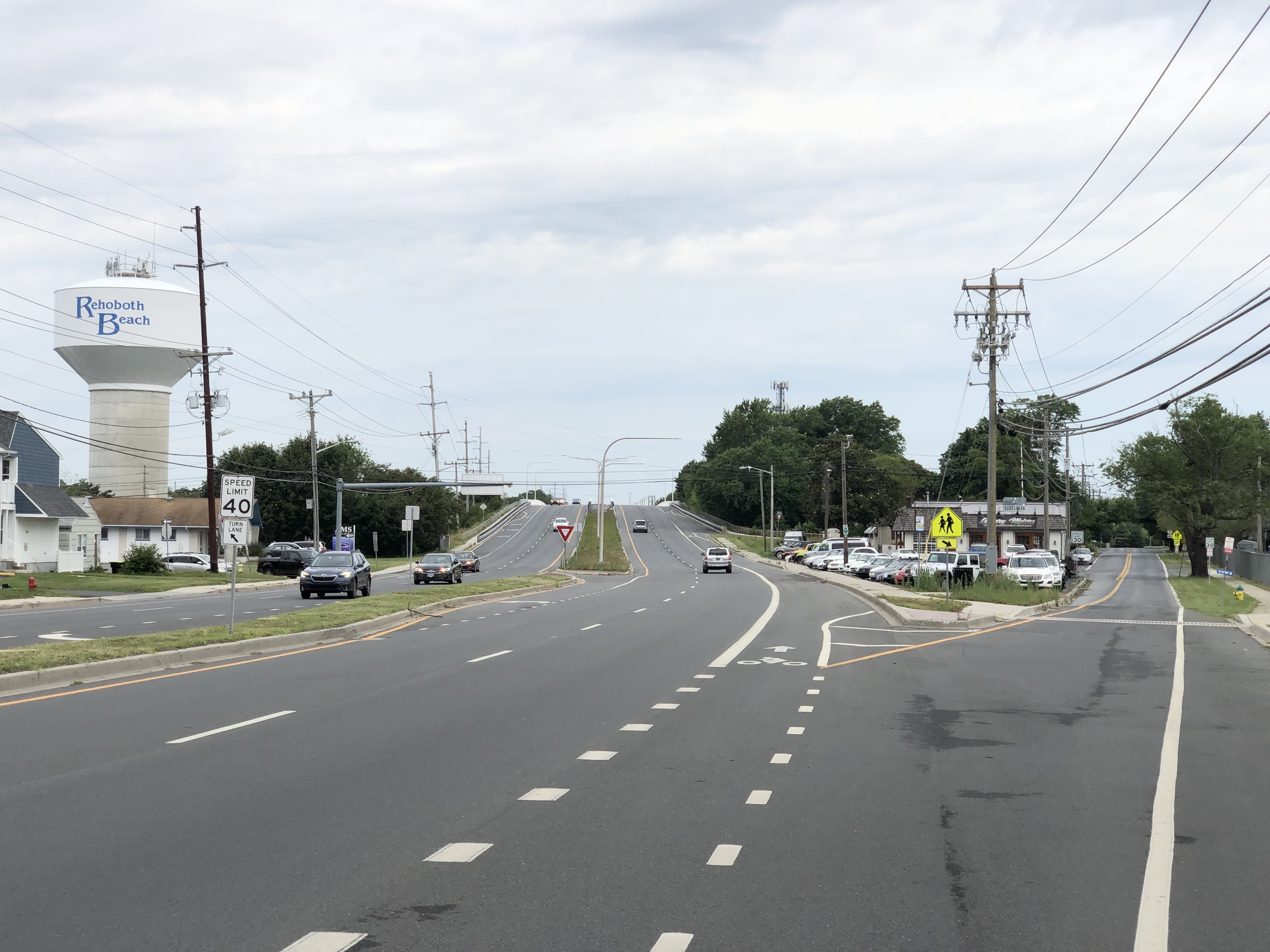
DE Route 1 north on the edge of Rehoboth Beach

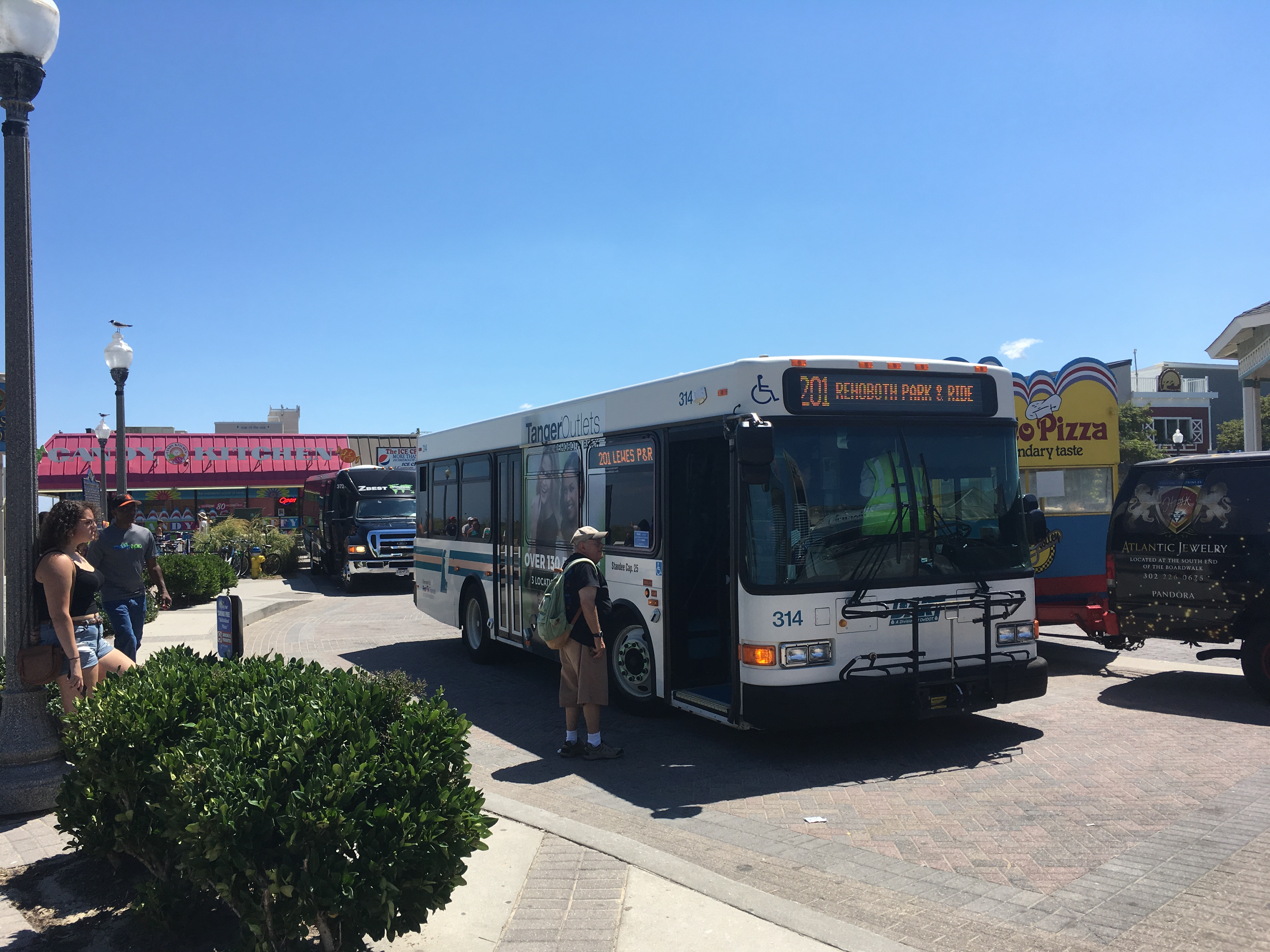
DART First State Beach Bus in Rehoboth Beach

Stop along Rehoboth’s boardwalk for the “Jolly Trolly”

Delaware Route 1 (Coastal Highway) passes along the southwestern edge of the city. Delaware Route 1A crosses through Rehoboth Beach in an L shape, running east from DE 1 and heading across a drawbridge over the Lewes and Rehoboth Canal into the city, where it heads east along Rehoboth Avenue to 2nd Street, then south along 2nd Street, Bayard Avenue, and Silver Lake Drive to another junction with DE 1 in Dewey Beach. Delaware Route 1B provides another route into Rehoboth Beach via State Road, connecting to DE 1 south of a high-level crossing of the Lewes and Rehoboth Canal. On-street parking in the downtown area is regulated by parking meters from the Friday before Memorial Day to the second Sunday after Labor Day. Between the Friday before Memorial Day and Labor Day, parking permits are required for all non-metered on-street parking spaces in Rehoboth Beach. A parking lot is also available at Deauville Beach in the northern part of the city, with parking permits required between the Friday before Memorial Day and the second Sunday after Labor Day.

The Delaware Department of Transportation operates a park and ride lot called the Rehoboth Beach Park and Ride just outside the city limits, located along Shuttle Road off of DE-1. During the peak summer months, DART First State operates Beach Bus service that provides frequent service in and out of the city and to the rest of the Delaware Beaches area and to Ocean City, Maryland, where it connects to Ocean City Transportation's Coastal Highway Beach Bus, from the Park and Ride lot. On summer weekends and holidays, DART First State operates the Route 305 "Beach Connection" service, which runs from Wilmington to the Lewes Transit Center, with intermediate stops at the Christiana Mall, Middletown, and Dover; connections can be made at the Lewes Transit Center to local bus service to Rehoboth Beach. DART First State also operates the year-round Route 201 service running between Rehoboth Beach and the Lewes Transit Center and the year-round Route 215 service which connects Rehoboth Beach with Millsboro; both of these routes offer expanded summer Beach Bus service.

The Delaware River and Bay Authority operates a shuttle bus during the summer months to the Tanger Outlets and the park and ride lot in Rehoboth Beach from the Cape May–Lewes Ferry, which provides ferry service across the Delaware Bay to Cape May, New Jersey.

The Jolly Trolley is a private shuttle service that provides frequent transport in Rehoboth Beach and to neighboring Dewey Beach. The service operates daily through the summer tourist season between Memorial Day weekend and Labor Day and on weekends in the shoulder season before Memorial Day and after Labor Day.

BestBus offered intercity bus service to Rehoboth Beach from Washington Union Station and Dupont Circle in Washington, D.C., and 34th Street in Midtown Manhattan in New York City on weekends in the summer months before the pandemic but has not resumed service as of July 2025.

Lewes Bus began twice daily service from the Lewes Transit Center to Philadelphia International Airport in July 2025.

The Junction and Breakwater Trail is a rail trail for bicyclists and hikers that connects Lewes and Rehoboth Beach, running 6 miles (9.7 km) mostly along a former Penn Central Railroad right-of-way.

=== Utilities ===
Delmarva Power, a subsidiary of Exelon, provides electricity to Rehoboth Beach. Chesapeake Utilities provides natural gas to the city. The city's Water Department provides water service, and the city's Waste Water Department provides sewer service in Rehoboth Beach and nearby outlying areas including North Shores and Breezewood. The city's Streets Department provides trash and recycling collection to homes and businesses in Rehoboth Beach.

== Education ==
Rehoboth Beach is located in the Cape Henlopen School District. The Rehoboth School District was consolidated into the Cape Henlopen district in 1969.

Rehoboth Beach is zoned to Rehoboth Elementary School. It is on a 25-acre (10 ha) plot of land. The current building opened in 2019. It has 92,000 square feet (8,500 m^{2}) of space. In the same location as the former building, it uses the same design as Brittingham and Love Creek schools. It had a cost of $33 million.

Cape Henlopen High School, located in Lewes, is the sole comprehensive high school of the district.

Seaside Jewish Community, established in 1997, established a Hebrew school for children in 2002.

== Notable people ==
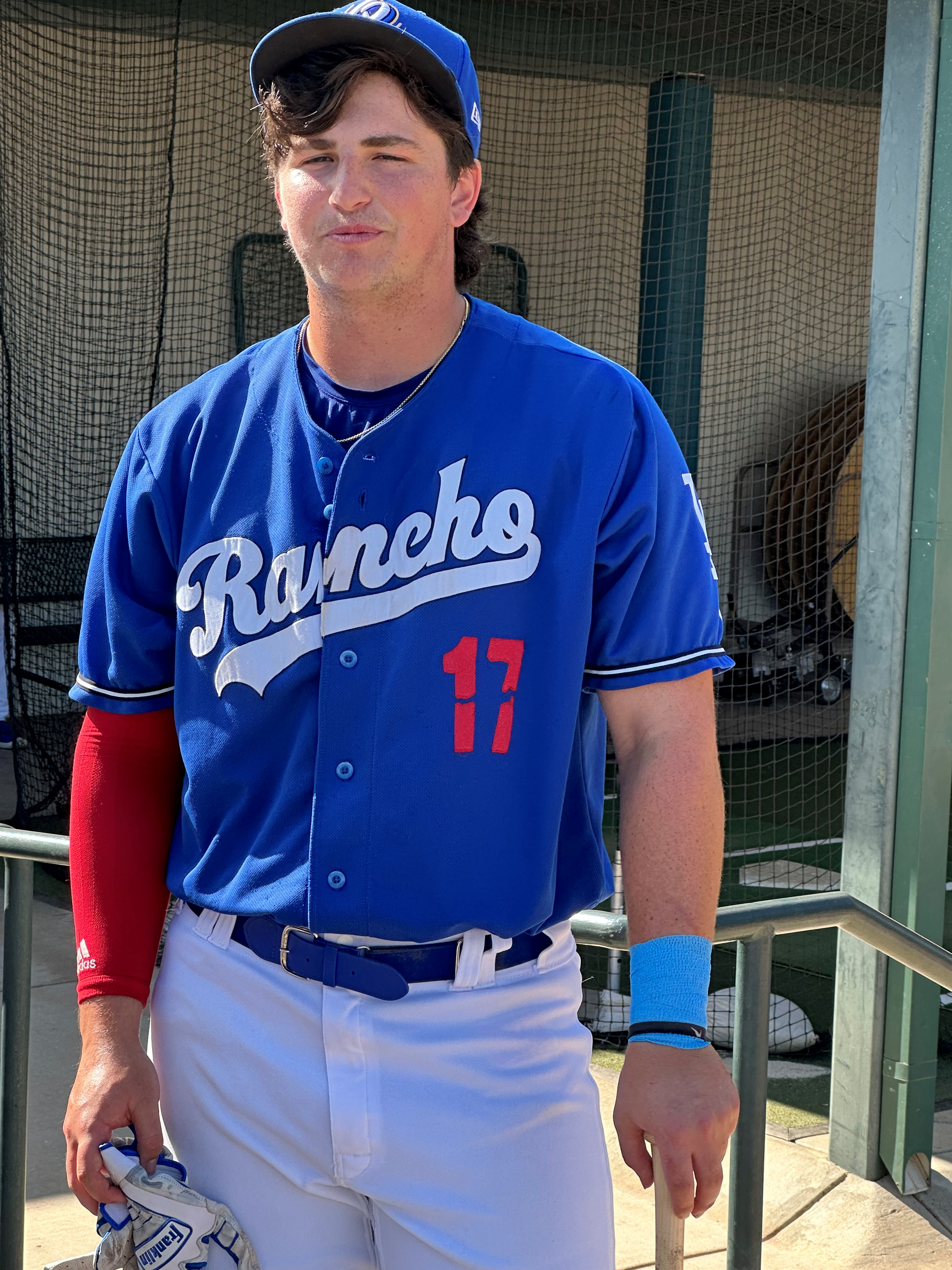
Jake Gelof

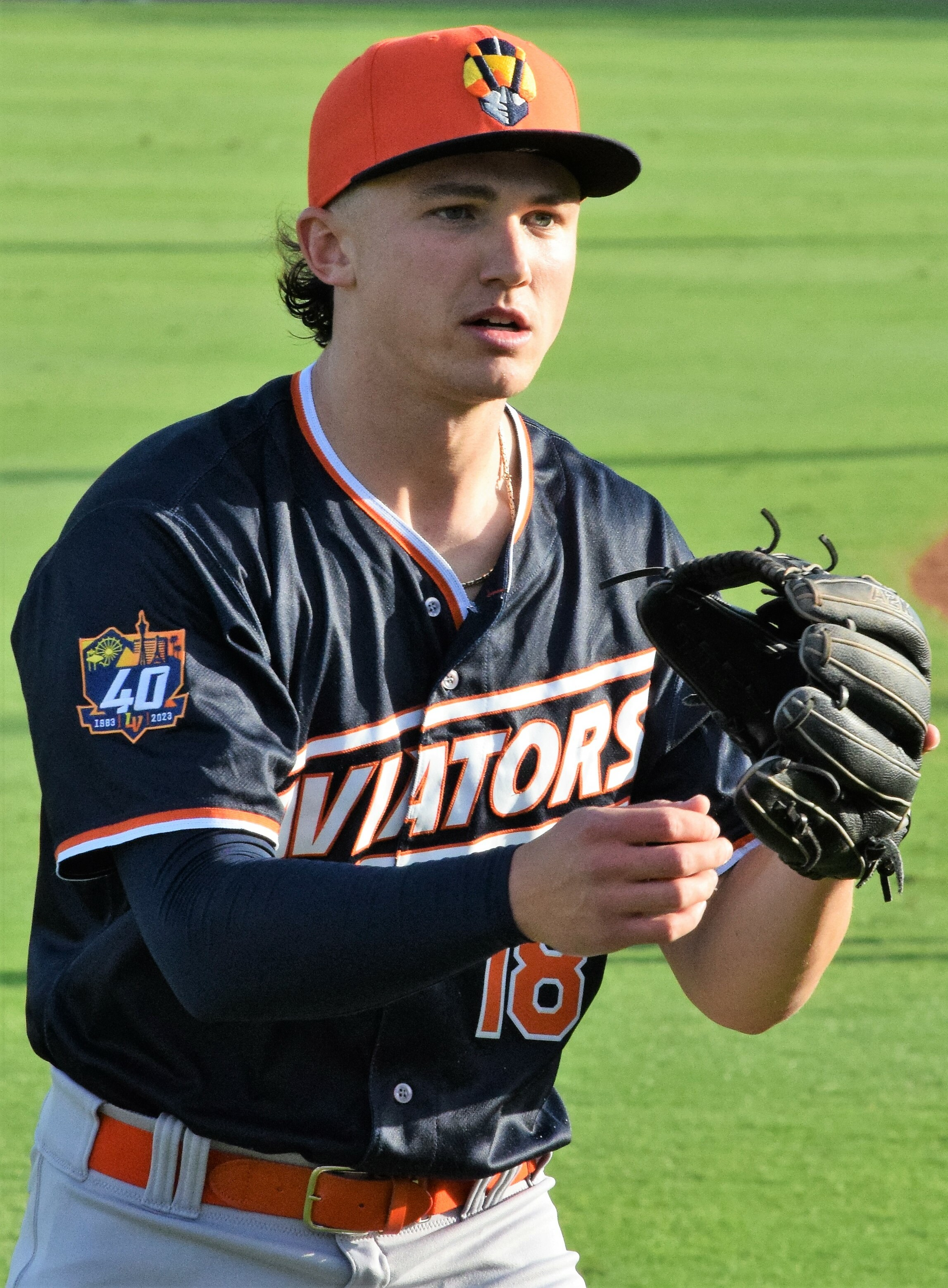
Zack Gelof

- Sarah Aldridge, writer of mainly lesbian fiction under pen name Anyda Marchant
- Joe Biden, 46th President of the United States (2021–2025), 47th Vice President of the United States (2009–2017), United States Senator from Delaware (1973–2009), and Jill Biden, educator and First Lady of the United States (2021–2025), Second Lady of the United States (2009–2017), own a beach house in the North Shores neighborhood, just north of the Rehoboth Beach city limits
- Tony Coelho, United States Representative for California's 15th congressional district (1979–1989)
- John Delaney, United States Representative for Maryland's 6th congressional district (2013–2019) and candidate for President of the United States in 2020, owns a beach house in the North Shores neighborhood, just north of the Rehoboth Beach city limits
- A. Felix du Pont, member of the du Pont family who served as vice president and director of E. I. du Pont de Nemours & Co., owned a summer home in Rehoboth Beach
- Mary Beth Ellis, long-distance triathlete
- Jake Gelof (born 2002), baseball third baseman
- Zack Gelof (born 1999), baseball second baseman for the Oakland A's
- Robert Gover, journalist and novelist
- Aurelio Grisanty, artist who painted the Beach Town Posters series
- Robert Cutler Hinckley, artist who painted portraits
- Tony Kornheiser, co-host of Pardon the Interruption on ESPN and former sportswriter
- Kathy McGuiness, Delaware State Auditor (2019–2022) and convicted criminal
- Chester I. Steele, United States Coast Guard admiral
- Robert McG. Thomas Jr., journalist, owned a summer home in Rehoboth Beach
- William H. Vernon, member of the Delaware House of Representatives (1977–1981)

Preceded by Henlopen Acres	Beaches of Delmarva	Succeeded by Dewey Beach
