= Avery's Rest Site =

Archaeological site in Delaware, United States

- U.S. National Register of Historic Places
- Nearest city: Rehoboth Beach, Delaware
- Area: 3 acres (1.2 ha)
- NRHP reference No.: 78000924
- Added to NRHP: December 15, 1978

Avery's Rest Site is an archaeological site located near Rehoboth Beach, Sussex County, Delaware. It is the site of the 17th century colonial plantation of Captain John Avery, who moved to this site from Maryland in 1675. Avery served as Captain of the Militia and Governor Edmund Andros appointed him a justice of the peace of Whorekill Court in 1678. He eventually had 800 acres of land on Rehoboth Bay and lived here until his death in 1682. The archaeology suggests the site was still lived at after his death. The site was excavated in 2007–08.

It was listed on the National Register of Historic Places in 1978.
