= Grotto Pizza =

American pizza restaurant chain

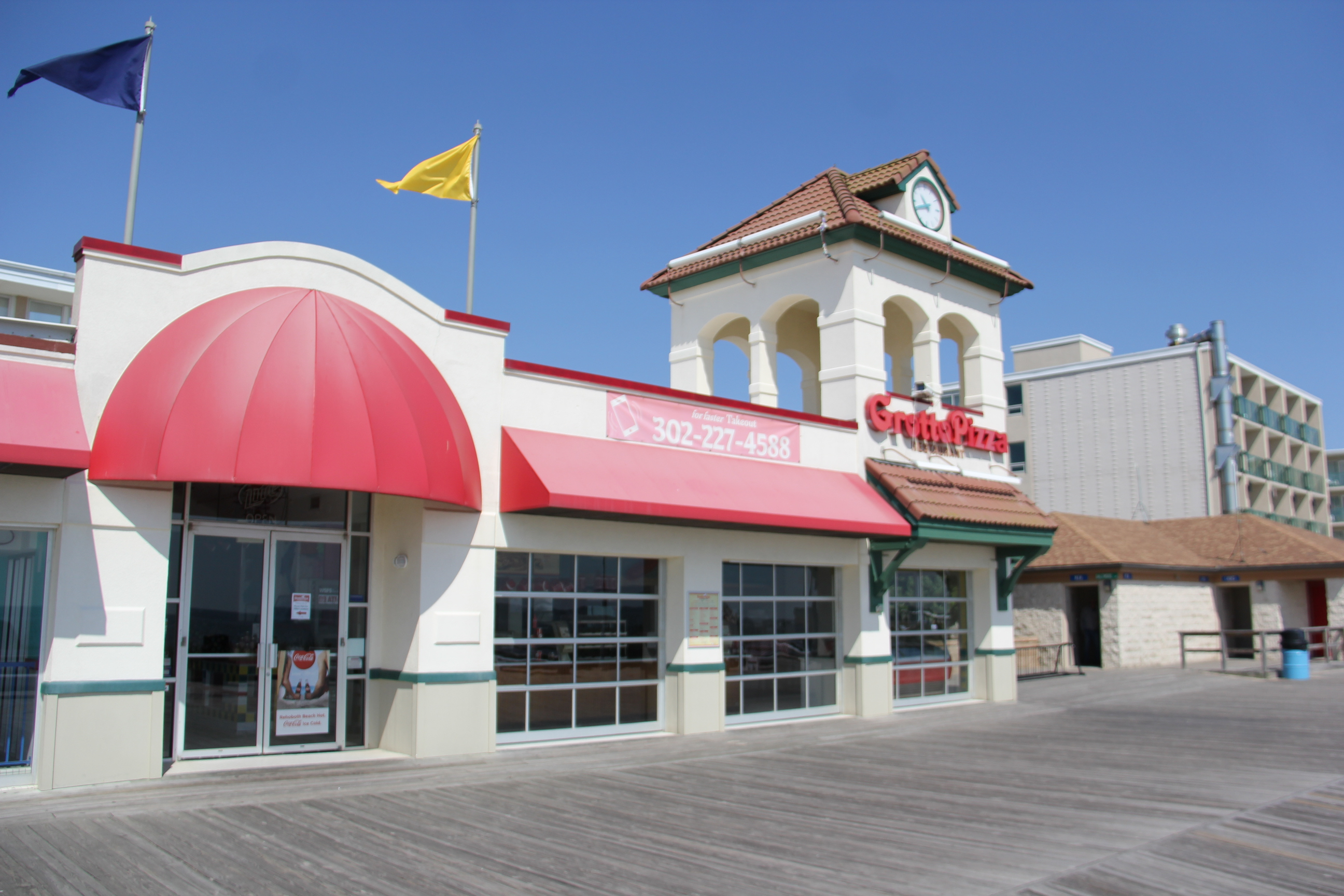
- Grotto Pizza location along the North boardwalk in Rehoboth Beach, Delaware
- Industry: Restaurants
- Founded: Rehoboth Beach, Delaware (1960; 66 years ago)
- Founder: Dominick Pulieri, Joseph Paglianite, and Mary Jean Paglianite
- Headquarters: 20376 Coastal Highway; Rehoboth Beach, DE 19971
- Number of locations: 19 (as of 2025)
- Products: Italian-American cuisine pizza
- Website: www.grottopizza.com

Grotto Pizza is a chain of restaurants that sell pizza and other Italian-American dishes, primarily located in the U.S. state of Delaware with a few locations in Maryland and Pennsylvania. The chain originated in Rehoboth Beach, Delaware in 1960, and has since expanded across the state of Delaware. In has become a regional pizza icon with a loyal following from both locals and tourists.

== Products ==
Grotto Pizza's main product is pizza, which is made with a swirl of sauce atop the cheese. The pizzas come with a variety of toppings along with specialty pizzas. In addition to pizza, Grotto Pizza also serves calzones, strombolis, appetizers, soup, salad, submarine sandwiches, cheesesteaks, burgers, pasta, Buffalo wings, and dessert options including gelato.

== Locations ==
As of 2025, Grotto Pizza has 19 locations in Delaware, Maryland, and Pennsylvania. In Delaware, Grotto Pizza has several locations in the Delaware Beaches area, in addition to locations in Millsboro, Seaford, Milford, Camden, Dover, Middletown, Newark, and two locations in Wilmington. The chain also has three locations in the Wilkes-Barre, Pennsylvania area along with two locations in Maryland: Ocean City and Columbia.

== History ==
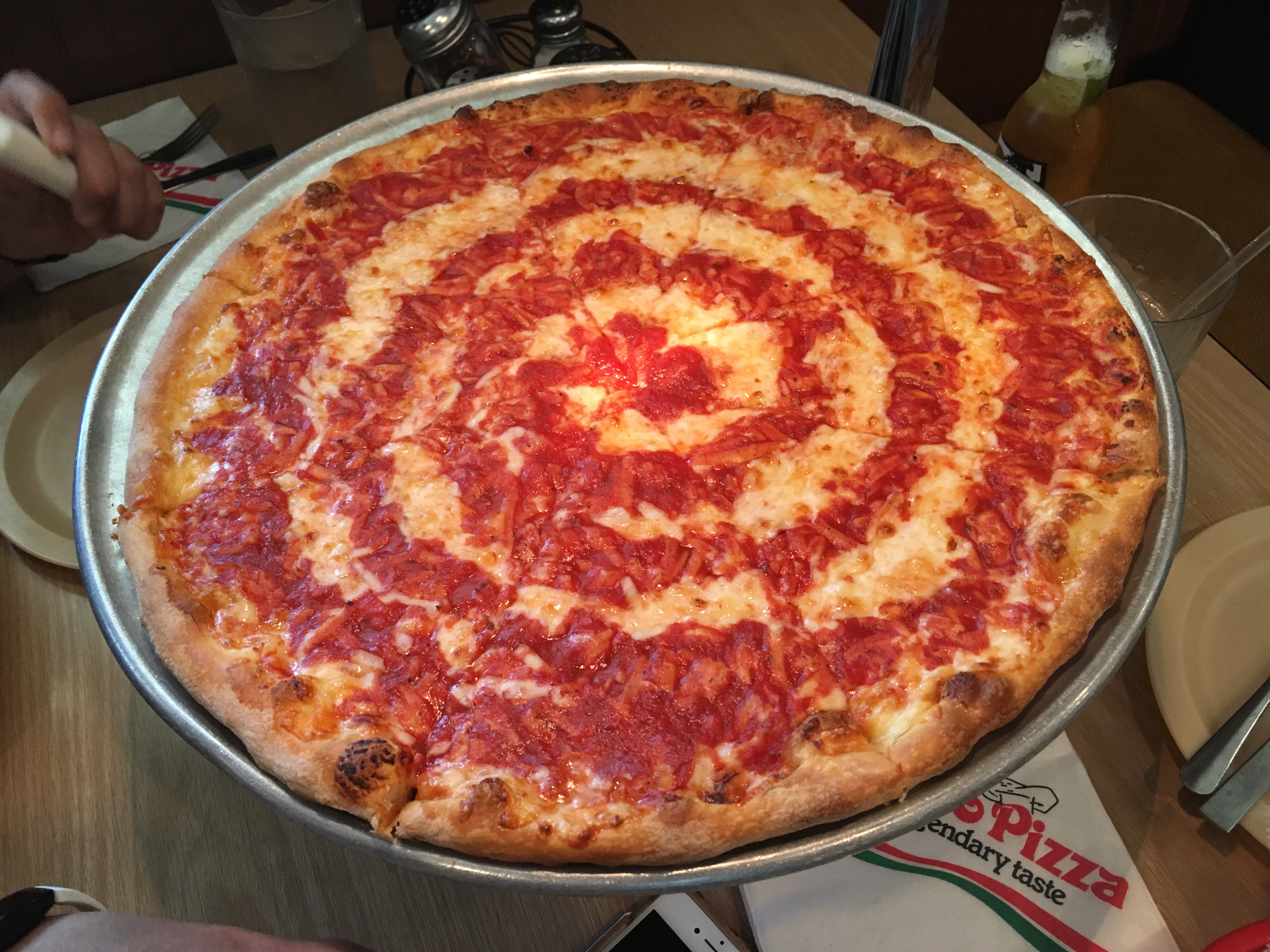
Cheese pizza from Grotto Pizza, with the swirl of sauce on top of the cheese

Grotto Pizza was founded in Rehoboth Beach, Delaware in 1960 by Dominick Pulieri and his brother-in-law Joseph Paglianite and his sister Mary Jean Paglianite. Pulieri was born in Wilkes-Barre, Pennsylvania, where he graduated from King's College with a degree in Biology. While living in Pennsylvania, he worked at his brother-in-law's pizza place, Joe's Pizza, in Harveys Lake. The first Grotto Pizza location was a take-out stand located along Rehoboth Avenue. In order to attract customers, Pulieri and his sister gave out free samples, and eventually the restaurant attracted both local Sussex County residents and tourists as regular customers.

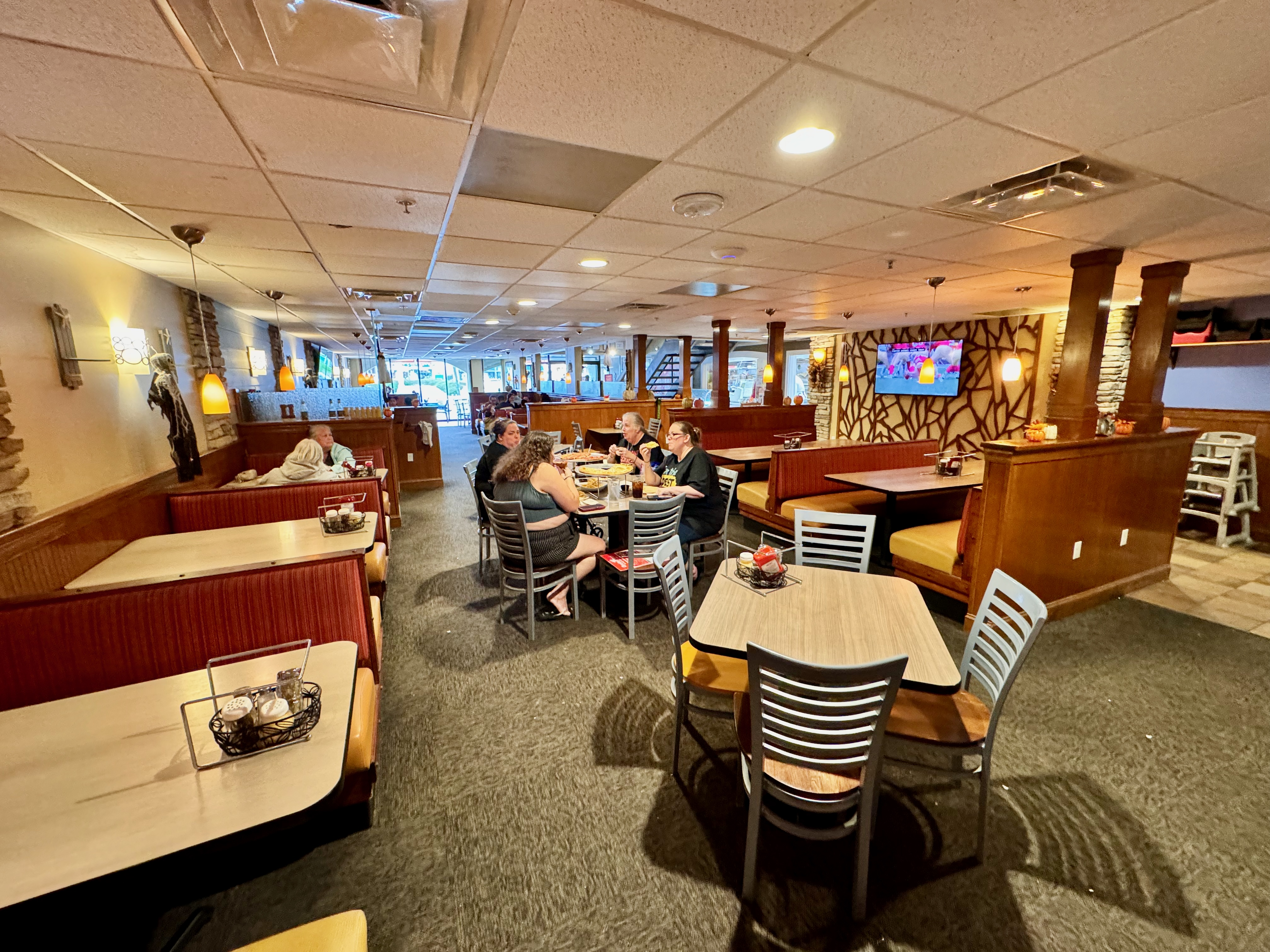
The interior of a Grotto Pizza restaurant

Grotto Pizza opened a second location in Rehoboth Beach on the boardwalk in 1963, and the Rehoboth Avenue restaurant moved to a larger location in 1967. The restaurant was originally a seasonal business only open during the summer months but became year-round in 1974. Grotto Pizza has grown to include locations throughout the state of Delaware along with a few locations in Maryland and Pennsylvania. Grotto Pizza has become a cultural icon in Delaware, particularly at the beach. In 2015, Grotto Pizza was inducted into the Pizza Hall of Fame.

In 2015, Grotto Pizza opened a restaurant in Gambrills, Maryland (now closed). This marked the beginning of a plan to expand into the Baltimore-Washington Metropolitan Area, where a lot of the summertime customers at the locations at the Delaware and Maryland beaches come from. A location in Columbia, Maryland opened in 2016.

In 2021, Grotto Pizza opened a production kitchen site in Dover, Delaware that centralizes dough production and handles dry storage and food distribution.

== See also ==
- List of pizza chains
