= Peter Marsh House =

Historic house in Delaware, United States

- U.S. National Register of Historic Places
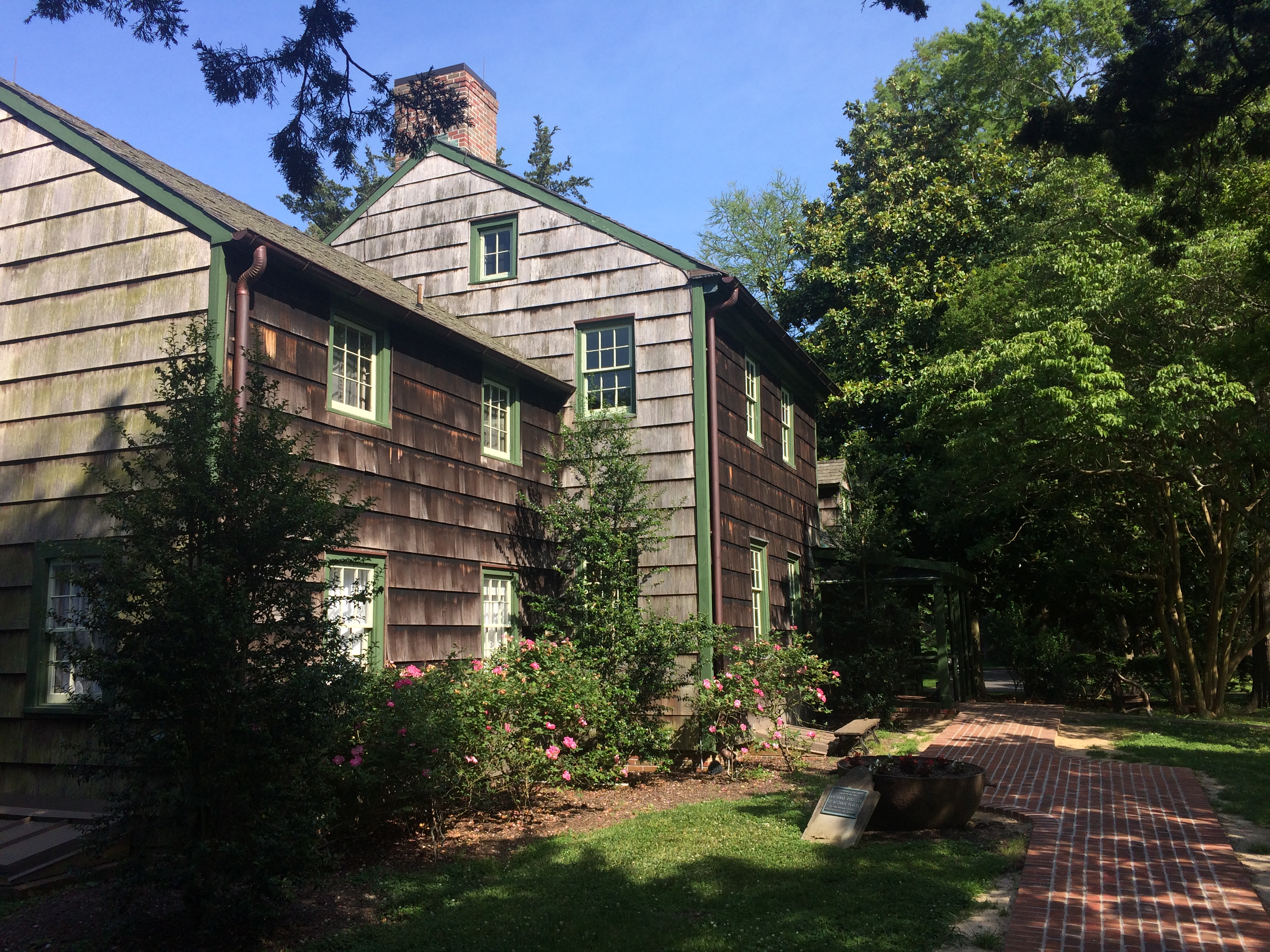
- Peter Marsh House in June 2020

- Location within Delaware Location within the United States
- Location: 10 Dodd's Lane, Henlopen Acres, Delaware
- Coordinates: 38°43′30″N 75°5′11″W
- Area: 1 acre (0.40 ha)
- Built by: Cockran, Col. Wilbur
- NRHP reference No.: 77000397
- Added to NRHP: November 23, 1977

Peter Marsh House, also known as The Homestead, is a historic home located in Henlopen Acres, just north of Rehoboth Beach, Sussex County, Delaware. The original house was built in the mid-18th century and consists of the 2 1/2-story, two-bay, main section and 1 1/2-story, three-bay kitchen wing. Attached to the kitchen wing is a one-story, one bay addition also dated to the mid 18th century, likely 1743. A two-story, two-bay addition with garage was added in the 20th century. The house is clad in cypress shingles. It was restored in the 1930s by Colonel Wilbur Corkran. It is owned by the Rehoboth Arts League, formerly by the University of Delaware.

It was added to the National Register of Historic Places in 1977.

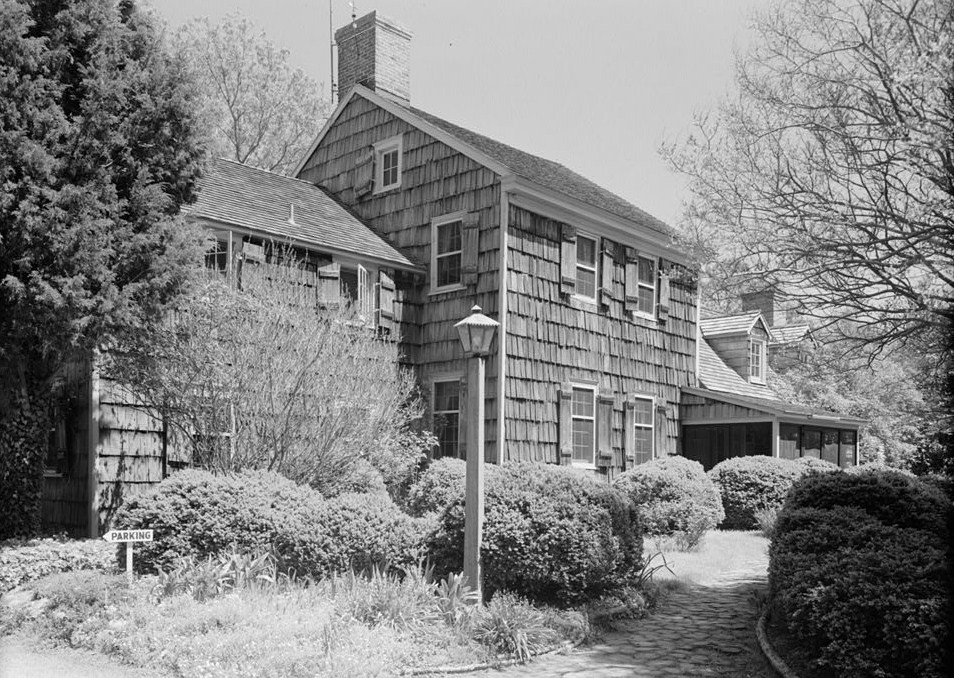
Peter Marsh House, HABS Photo, April 1959
