= Funland, Rehoboth Beach =

Amusement park in the U.S.

Funland
- Previously known as The Rehoboth Beach Sports Center
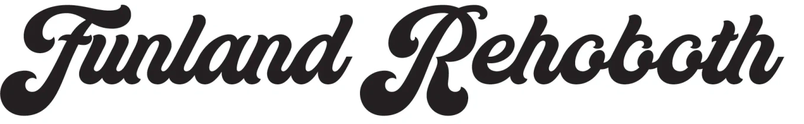
- Interactive map of Funland
- Location: Rehoboth Beach, Delaware, United States
- Coordinates: 38.71480719926888°N 75.07622843259031°W
- Status: Operating
- Opened: 1939
- Owner: Al Faschnacht (died 2025)
- Operated by: Seaside Amusements
- General manager: Chris Darr
- Slogan: Today's Fun at Yesterdays Prices
- Operating season: Mother's Day Weekend - Weekend After Labor Day
- Attendance: 250,000–350,000
- Area: 1 acre (0.40 ha)

Attractions
- Total: 18, as well as a kids play area
- Roller coasters: 0
- Water rides: 0
- Website: https://funlandrehoboth.com

Funland is a small family owned amusement park in Rehoboth Beach, Delaware. It has 18 rides, as well as midway games, and an arcade. It is located right off the Rehoboth Beach boardwalk. The park opened in 1939 as the Rehoboth Beach Sports Center. It was purchased by the Fasnacht family in 1962, and was renamed Funland. Today, it is still owned and operated by the Fasnacht family. Funland still has some rides that were there when it was purchased. The two oldest rides are The Boats and The Fire Engines. Both of them were likely opened in 1946 or 1947. The park is known for its cheaply priced tickets, its Haunted Mansion ride, which was custom built specifically for Funland, and for being the only amusement park in the state of Delaware.

== History ==
Before the name was changed to Funland in 1962, the park was known as The Rehoboth Beach Sports Center. It was owned by the Dentino family. On March 6, 1962, nine days before the sale was final, the Ash Wednesday Storm of 1962 started. The storm lasted three days. The Rehoboth Beach Sports Center was one of the few business that were not destroyed by the storm. It was damaged but the Faschnacht family decided they still wanted buy it. Now, excluding during the COVID-19 pandemic, Funland gets between 250,000 and 350,000 visitors each year.

== Rides ==
Funland has 18 rides, as well as a kids play area. 5 of the 18 rides were there when Funland was purchased. These rides are the Merry Go Round, Boats, Fire Engines, Sky Fighters, and Helicopters.

Rides	Attraction Type	Year Ride Opened
Boats	Red Baron	Likely 1946 or 1947
Fire Engines	Red Baron	1946 or 1947
Merry Go Round	Carousel	1960
Sky Fighters	Red Baron	Between 1956 and 1962
Cycles	Red Baron	1971
Swinger	Swing	1984
Kiddie Wheel	Kiddie Ferris Wheel	2005
Trucks	Red Baron	2000
Cruisers	Music Express	1988
Helicopters	Red Baron	1961
Crazy Dazys	Teacups	1964
Free Spin	Kiddie Drop Tower	2022
Paratrooper	Paratrooper	1982
Gravitron	Gravitron	1984
Bumpler Cars	Bumper Cars	2001
Sea Dragon	Pirate Ship	1990
Superflip 360	Pendulum	2017
Haunted Mansion	Haunted House	1979
