= Thompsons Island Site =

Archaeological site in Delaware, United States

- U.S. National Register of Historic Places
- Nearest city: Rehoboth Beach, Delaware
- Area: 60 acres (24 ha)
- NRHP reference No.: 78000926
- Added to NRHP: November 15, 1978

Thompsons Island Site is an archaeological site located near Rehoboth Beach, Sussex County, Delaware. Thompson's Island was first identified as an archaeological site in 1942. The Delaware Department of Natural Resources and Environmental Control acquired the property in January 1990. The site appears to have functioned as a micro-band base camp, repeatedly re-occupied by small groups of people for several weeks at a time. No extensive occupation appears to have taken place before the beginning of the Woodland I Period, about 3000 B.C., with the greatest intensity of occupation on Thompson's Island occurred between 500 B.C. and A.D. 0; the time period associated with the Wolfe Neck and Delmarva Adena cultural complexes.

It was added to the National Register of Historic Places in 1978.
