= Silver Lake (Rehoboth Beach, Delaware) =

Lake in Rehoboth Beach, Delaware, United States

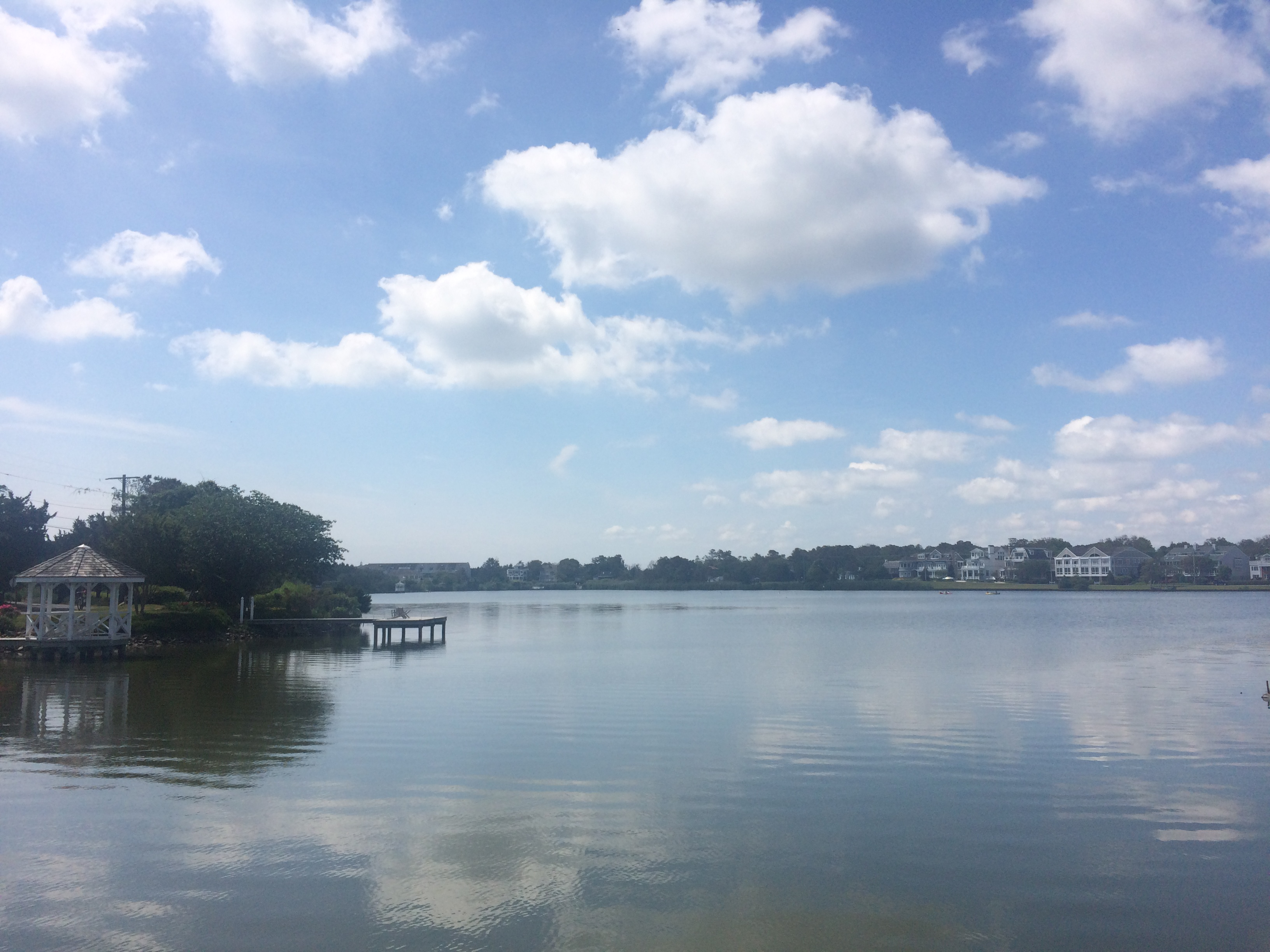
- Silver Lake in 2020

- Location within Delaware Location within the United States
- Location: Rehoboth Beach, Delaware
- Coordinates: 38°42′22″N 75°04′40″W
- Type: Freshwater
- Settlements: Rehoboth Beach, Delaware

Silver Lake is part of a pair of freshwater lakes including Lake Comegys in Rehoboth, Sussex County, Delaware. The two lakes were formed by receding glaciers, and now serves as a bird refuge.

== Description ==
Both lakes were formed during the end of the last ice age, from runoff from the retreating Wisconsin glaciation. Silver Lake was among the lakes formed by this process.

Of the two bodies, Silver Lake is larger. The smaller Lake Comegys was formed in the early 19th century when pollution from a local tannery sealed off a far end of Silver Lake, isolating the new body of water. Both lakes are notably close to the nearby Atlantic Ocean, and are considered to be the closest freshwater lakes to the Atlantic Ocean in the United States. The pair are also the only natural freshwater lakes in the state of Delaware. During the Age of Sail Silver Lake was used by passing ships to replenish their supply of fresh water.

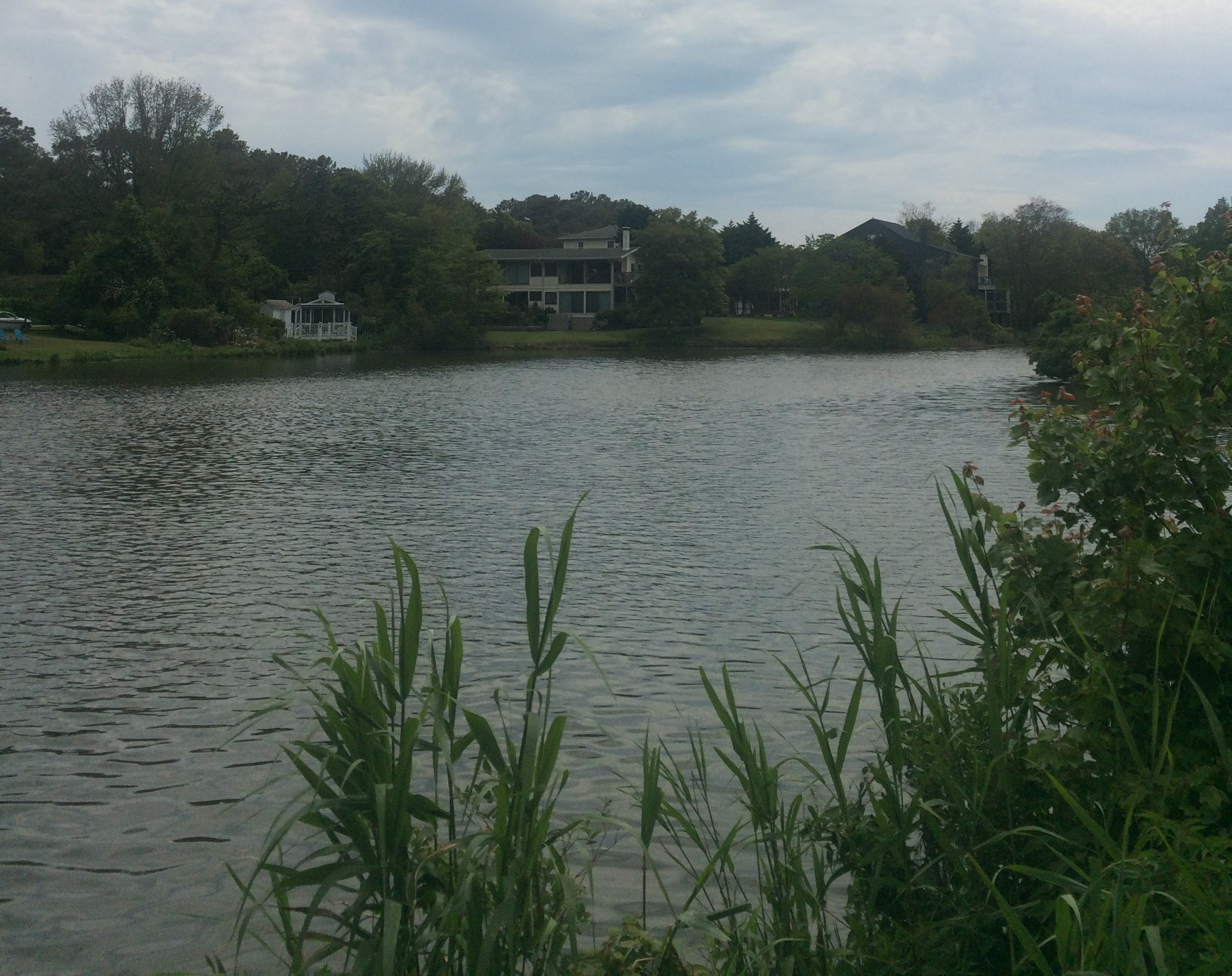
Lake Comegys in June 2020

Both lakes are fed by runoff and underground springs. In the 1920s the DuPont Company used dynamite to help drain sediment buildup in the lakes.

In 1933, the state of Delaware established both lakes as state bird refuges. Delaware passed a resolution in 2004 declaring both lakes to be natural treasures of Delaware, citing the lakes' unique proximity to the Atlantic and their status as the only natural freshwater lakes in the state. The lakes are also managed by Save Our Lakes Alliance3, a local non-profit.
