= Dodd-Hinsdale House =

Historic house in North Carolina, United States

- U.S. National Register of Historic Places
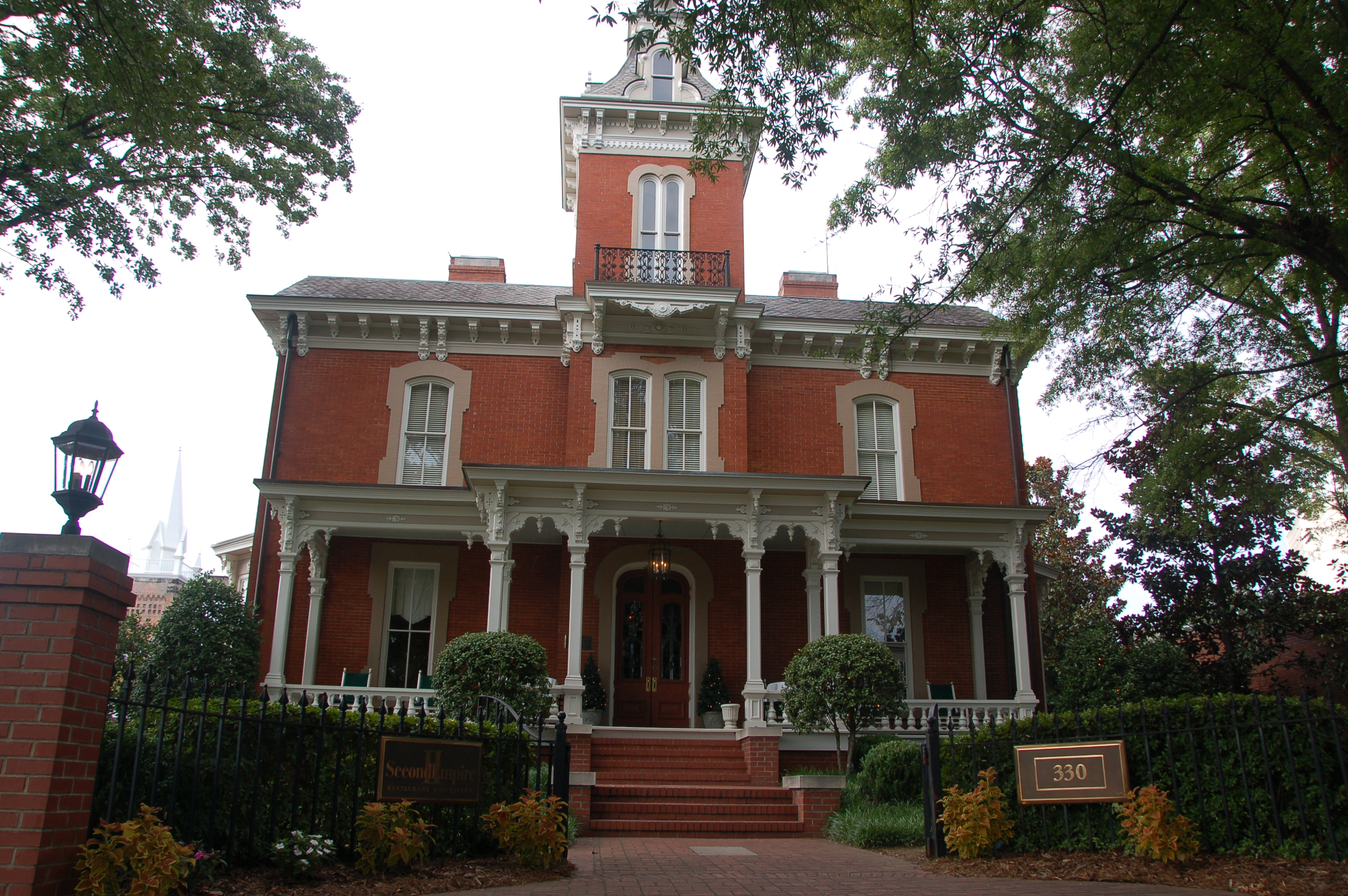

- Location within North Carolina Location within the United States
- Location: 330 Hillsborough St. Raleigh, North Carolina
- Coordinates: 35°46′51.30″N 78°38′41.4″W
- Built: 1887
- Architect: Briggs, Thomas
- Architectural style: Italianate, Second Empire
- NRHP reference No.: 71000623
- Added to NRHP: November 12, 1971

The Dodd-Hinsdale House was built in 1879 for the family of the Raleigh, Wake County, North Carolina, city mayor. It was constructed in the Italianate style, with some Second Empire embellishments.

== Background and early history ==
The Dodd-Hinsdale House was fabricated in 1879 in Raleigh, North Carolina, for city mayor, William H. Dodd. It is a brick house with bracketed eaves, narrow Segmental arch windows, porches, and carved millwork—which are all characteristic of the Italianate style. The shallow gable roof is also an Italianate feature, but the tower with concave mansard roof and ornate dormers is distinctly "Second Empire" in style. Despite the mix of features, Virginia and Lee McAlester classified the house as Italianate with an uncommon mansard roof. The design is very similar to an 1875 wood house at 304 Oakwood Avenue which was constructed by the same builder. The structure is a surviving example of the luxurious and prestigious houses built on Hillsborough Street in the late 19th century, many of which have since been replaced by modern commercial buildings.

== Later history ==
In 1890, Dodd sold the house to John W. Hinsdale. The house was kept in the Hinsdale family until 1971. For a couple of decades the fate of the house was uncertain—despite its 1971 listing on the National Register of Historic Places as a Raleigh Historic Property. At the end of the 1980s, the owners attempted to renovate the house—but failed to complete it—leaving the house vacant and partially gutted. On September 9, 1997, it was bought by a private company and turned into a luxury restaurant named "Second Empire," giving recognition to its past and architectural design.

== Sources ==
- Harris, Linda L., et al., An Architectural and Historical Inventory of Raleigh, North Carolina; Raleigh; City of Raleigh Planning Department and The Raleigh Historic Properties Commission; 1978.
- Raleigh: A Capital City; A National Register of Historic Places Travel Itinerary; the Dodd-Hinsdale House.
