= Dodd Homestead =

- U.S. National Register of Historic Places
- Location within Delaware Location within the United States
- Location: West of Rehoboth Beach on Delaware Route 1, near Rehoboth Beach, Delaware
- Coordinates: 38°43′1″N 75°6′40″W
- Area: 3.7 acres (1.5 ha)
- Built: c. 1830
- Architectural style: Greek Revival, Federal
- NRHP reference No.: 82002367
- Added to NRHP: August 26, 1982

Dodd Homestead was a historic home and farmstead located near Rehoboth Beach, Sussex County, Delaware. It was a modified L-shaped, wood-frame dwelling, the earliest portion of which dated to about 1830. The main house was a long, rectangular, two-story, single-pile structure in a vernacular Federal / Greek Revival style. It had a wing, that was originally one-story. but later raised to a full two stories, probably in the mid-19th century. There was also a two-story rear wing. The house was sheathed in hand-hewn cypress shingles and had stuccoed brick interior end chimneys. Contributing 19th century outbuildings included a low brick ash shed, milk house, wood shed, storage shed, a small shed-roofed poultry house, stable, barn, a large gable-roofed dairy barn, corn crib, and carriage house.

It was added to the National Register of Historic Places in 1982. It is listed on the Delaware Cultural and Historic Resources GIS system as demolished or destroyed.
