= Jake Gelof =

American baseball player (born 2000)

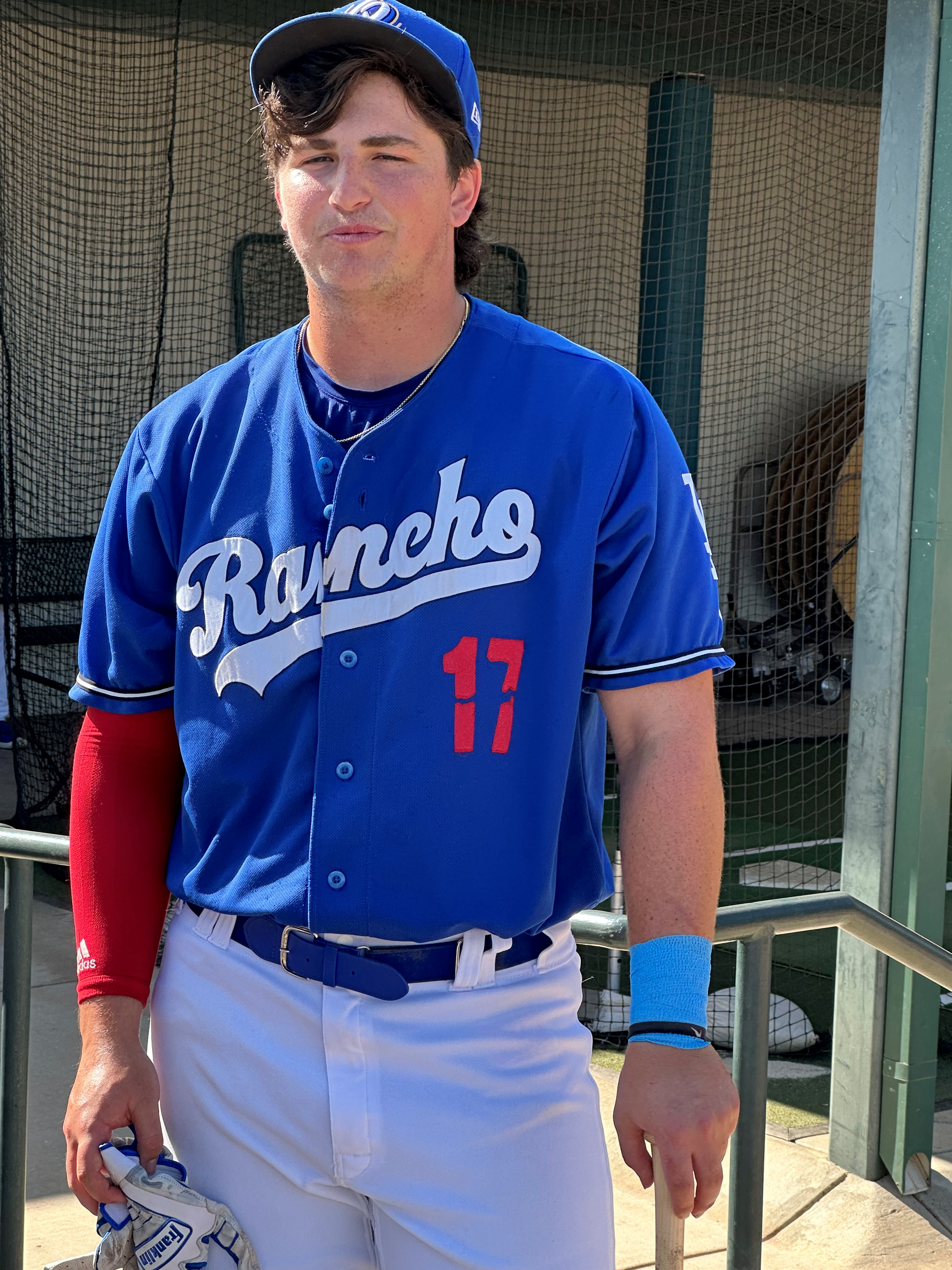
- Gelof with the Rancho Cucamonga Quakes

Los Angeles Dodgers
- Second baseman
- Born: February 25, 2002 (age 24); Rehoboth Beach, Delaware, U.S.
- Bats: Right Throws: Right
- Stats at Baseball Reference

Jakob Dunn Gelof (born February 25, 2002) is an American baseball third baseman and second baseman for the Los Angeles Dodgers organization. He played college baseball for the Virginia Cavaliers and is the University of Virginia’s all-time career home run leader, and holds its single-season home run and RBI records.

The Dodgers selected him with the 60th pick of the 2023 Major League Baseball draft. In 2026, he was the Texas League home run champion, and named to the Texas League post-season All Star team.

== Early life ==
Gelof was born and grew up in Rehoboth Beach, Delaware, where he attended Hebrew school in the Seaside Jewish Community. His parents are Adam and Kelly Gelof, both of whom are attorneys, and he is Jewish. His grandmother was the president of Congregation Beth Sholom in Dover. His older brother Zack Gelof was a member of the UVA baseball team from 2019 to 2021. Zack Gelof was also a second-round pick of the Oakland Athletics in 2021, made his MLB debut for Oakland in 2023, and played for Team Israel in the 2023 World Baseball Classic.

== High school ==
Gelof initially attended Cape Henlopen High School in Delaware, from 2016 to 2018. He played two years of baseball at the school. He also played two years of soccer at the school, earning All-Conference honors his sophomore year as a goalkeeper after eight shutouts. He was an Academic All-Conference selection in both baseball and soccer as both a freshman and sophomore. He was Perfect Game's top ranked overall baseball player and No. 1 shortstop in Delaware's 2020 class.

He transferred to IMG Academy ('20) in Bradenton, Florida, after his sophomore season, for his final two years of high school. In early 2019, Gelof threw a 91 mph fastball (and threw 92 mph from the infield, and 94 mph from the outfield), and ran a 6.95 second 60-yard dash. He played summer collegiate baseball after graduating high school for the Brockton Rox of the Futures Collegiate Baseball League, and batted .281/.372/.422 with eight doubles (7th in the league), two triples (4th), two home runs, and 19 RBIs in 128 at bats, while primarily playing shortstop.

== College ==
=== 2021–2022 ===
Gelof attended the University of Virginia, where he was a Media Studies major. He became a starter for Virginia at first base (while also making appearances at third base and in right field) during his freshman season in 2021, and batted .252/.336/.468 with 23 runs, 8 doubles, 4 home runs, and 15 RBIs in 111 at bats. All four of his home runs were hit in postseason play. He played in the same infield with his older brother Zack Gelof as the team advanced to the 2021 College World Series. After the season, Gelof played for the Kalamazoo Growlers of the wooden bat Northwoods League, where he batted .370(third in the league)/.445/.597(third) with 10 doubles, 5 home runs, and 21 RBIs in 119 at bats.

Gelof moved to third base prior to his sophomore season in 2022. He hit for the cycle on February 27, 2022, becoming the first Virginia player to do so in 21 years. He was named the Atlantic Coast Conference (ACC) Player of the Week the following day after going 9-10 during the series with four home runs and 15 RBIs. Midway through the season, Gelof was added to the watchlist for and was a semi-finalist for the Golden Spikes Award, and the Dick Howser Trophy presented by the NCBWA.

In his sophomore season in 2022 he set school records with 21 home runs (8th in the conference) and 81 RBIs (2nd in the conference; 6th in the nation), and had a .764 slugging percentage (10th in the nation), while batting .377 (4th) with a .477 on-base percentage (5th) and five sacrifice flies (6th) in 212 at bats. Gelof was named 2022 First Team All-ACC, and a First Team CoSIDA Academic All-American. He also earned Second Team All-America honors from ABCA/Rawlings and Perfect Game, and Third Team All-America honors from NCBWA, Collegiate Baseball Newspaper, Baseball America, and D1Baseball.com.

Gelof played seven games for the Harwich Mariners of the Cape Cod Baseball League at the beginning of the following summer, before being selected to play for the United States collegiate national team.

=== 2023 ===
Gelof began his junior year in 2023 being named a Preseason First Team All-American by Collegiate Baseball Newspaper, NCBWA, and Perfect Game, and a Preseason Second Team All-American by D1Baseball. He was named a semifinalist for the Golden Spikes Award, the 35th player in the award's history to be a semifinalist in multiple seasons.

Playing for Virginia in his junior year in 2023 he hit .321/.427/.710(7th in the ACC) with 71 runs (8th), 23 doubles (3rd), 3 triples (6th), 23 home runs (4th), and 90 RBIs (leading the ACC) and 6 sacrifice flies (4th) in 252 at bats, as he walked 48 times (8th) and struck out 50 times, while playing third base. He was named a Second Team All-American by Collegiate Baseball Newspaper and NCBWA, a Third Team All-American by Perfect Game, a First Team ABCA All-Atlantic Region selection at third base, and First Team All-ACC at third base for the second straight season.

Gelof is UVA's all-time home run leader, and holds its single-season home run and RBI records.

Baseball writer Jim Callis said he thought that Gelof was a potential first-round pick or supplemental first-round pick in the 2023 Major League Baseball draft. He was ranked #36 by MLB Pipeline ("A right-handed-hitting corner infielder, Gelof does not get cheated at the plate. He has an aggressive approach, looking to do damage and tap into his huge raw power ... but he showed an ability to get to his power in 2022, limit strikeouts, draw walks and make adjustments..."), #37 by The Athletic, #40 by Baseball America, #50 by ESPN, and #70 by Perfect Game.

== Professional career ==
The Los Angeles Dodgers selected Gelof in the second round, with the 60th pick of the 2023 Major League Baseball draft. He signed with the Dodgers for a $1,334,400 signing bonus.

Gelof made his professional baseball debut on July 27, 2023, for the Arizona Complex League Dodgers. After four games, he was promoted to the Single-A Rancho Cucamonga Quakes. Between the two levels, he played in 34 games, hitting .226/.325/.459 with six home runs and 27 RBI in 133 at bats. He was named California League Player of the Month in September 2023. Gelof was selected to participate in the inaugural "Spring Breakout" minor league showcase during spring training 2024.

Gelof returned to Rancho Cucamonga to start the 2024 season and was then promoted to the Great Lakes Loons on May 7. Between the two levels, he played in 109 games with 383 at bats and batted .214 with 10 homers, 67 RBI, and 20 stolen bases in 24 attempts, while leading the Midwest League with nine sacrifice flies. After the season, he was assigned to the Glendale Desert Dogs of the Arizona Fall League, with whom he batted .353/.478/.824 in six games.

Gelof played the 2025 season with the Loons. He batted .224./318/.454 in 88 games in 313 at bats with 24 doubles (7th in the league), 16 home runs (tied for 4th), and 63 RBI (8th). Following the season, he played for Team Israel in the 2026 World Baseball Classic.

In 2026, playing for the Double–A Tulsa Drillers, Gelof led the Texas League with 34 home runs, setting a modern-era (since 1932) Tulsa record. He batted .271/.385/.565 (2nd among qualified batters) in 425 at–bats with 90 runs (4th in the league), 103 RBI (2nd), 84 walks (tied for 2nd), 11 sacrifice flies (tied for league lead), and 10 stolen bases in 11 attempts. On defense, Gelof played 51 games at third base, 46 at second base, 23 at first base, and one at shortstop. He was named the Texas League All Star designated hitter.

== See also ==
- List of select Jewish baseball players
