= Delaware Route 14 =

State highway in Kent County, Delaware, United States

Delaware Route 14

Route information
- Maintained by DelDOT
- Length: 19.47 mi (31.33 km)
- Existed: 1936–present
- Tourist routes: Delaware Bayshore Byway

Major junctions
- West end: MD 317 near Burrsville, MD
- US 13 / DE 14 Truck in Harrington; DE 15 in Milford; US 113 in Milford; DE 1 Bus. in Milford
- East end: DE 1 in Milford

Location
- Country: United States
- State: Delaware
- Counties: Kent

Highway system
- Delaware State Route System; List; Byways
← US 13	→ DE 14A

Delaware Route 14 (DE 14) is a state highway in the southern part of Kent County, Delaware. The route runs from the Maryland state line near Burrsville, Maryland, where the road continues as Maryland Route 317 (MD 317), east to DE 1 in Milford. The route passes through Harrington, where it intersects U.S. Route 13 (US 13), and heads to the north of Houston before coming to Milford, where it intersects DE 15, US 113, and DE 1 Business (DE 1 Bus.). DE 14 has a truck bypass of Harrington known as DE 14 Truck.

DE 14 was first designated by 1936 to run from the Maryland state line near Burrsville east to DE 26 in Bethany Beach. The road was extended south to Fenwick Island in 1939. In the 1940s, the road was realigned to bypass Rehoboth Beach. The route between Nassau and Rehoboth Beach was widened into a divided highway in the 1950s, with all of DE 14 southeast of Milford being upgraded to a divided highway by the 1970s. In 1977, most of DE 14 east of Milford was replaced with DE 1, with the eastern terminus being realigned to its current location by 1984. The DE 1 intersection became an interchange in 2019.

== Route description ==
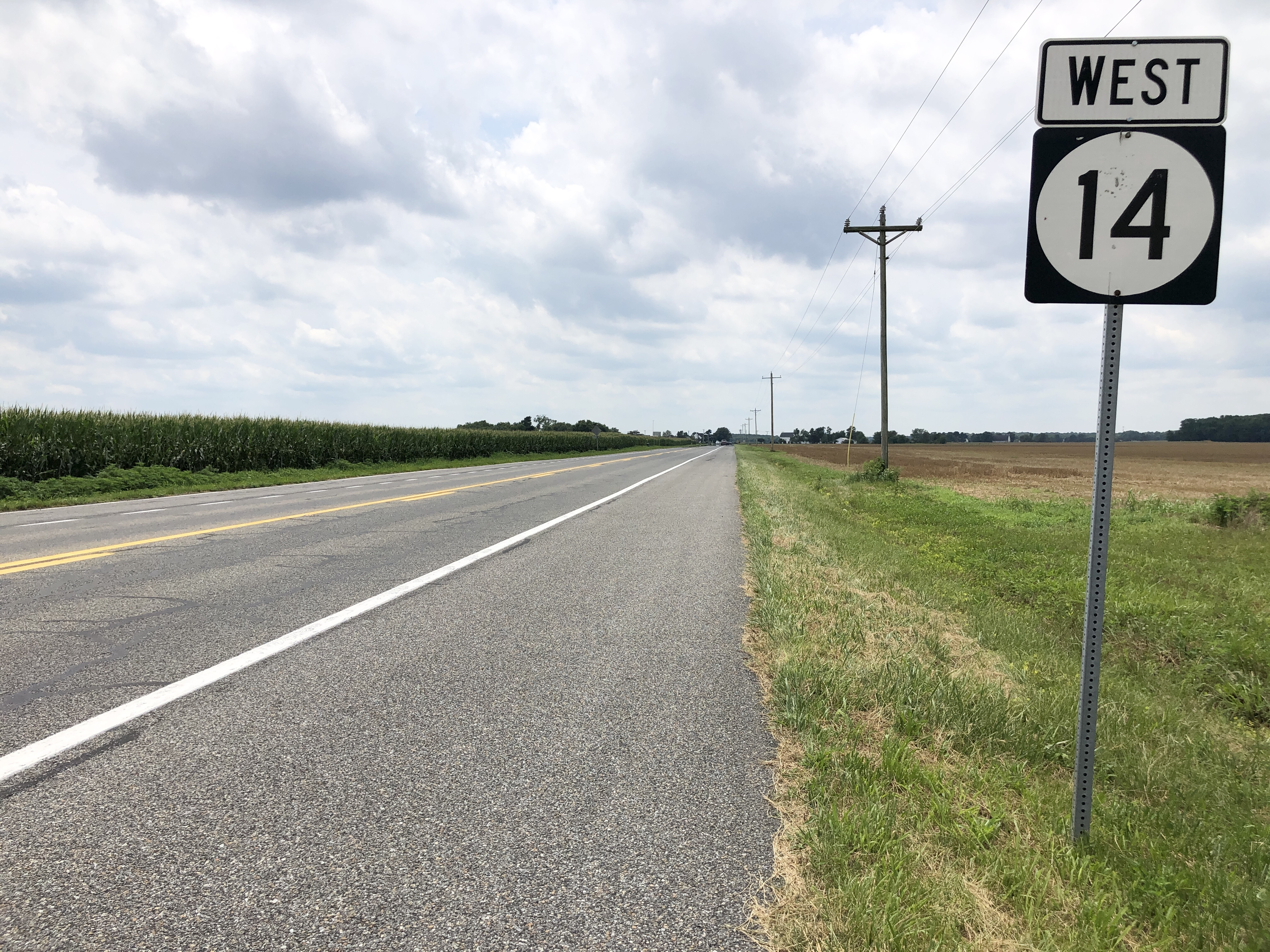
DE 14 westbound west of Harrington

DE 14 begins at the Maryland state line near Burrsville, Maryland, where the road continues west into that state as MD 317. From the state line, the route heads east on two-lane undivided Vernon Road, passing through a mix of farmland and woodland with occasional homes and crossing Marshyhope Creek in the community of Vernon. The road curves to the northeast before bending east at the Whiteleysburg Road intersection. The route becomes Walt Messick Road and enters the city of Harrington. DE 14 runs past homes and some businesses before intersecting the western terminus of DE 14 Truck, which bypasses Harrington to the south. At this point, DE 14 heads northeast on Commerce Street into the downtown area. Here, the route turns east onto Clark Street and passes north of the Harrington Tower Railroad Museum before it crosses the Delmarva Central Railroad's Delmarva Subdivision line at-grade adjacent to the Harrington Yard. On the eastern edge of Harrington, DE 14 intersects US 13 and the eastern terminus of DE 14 Truck in a commercial area.

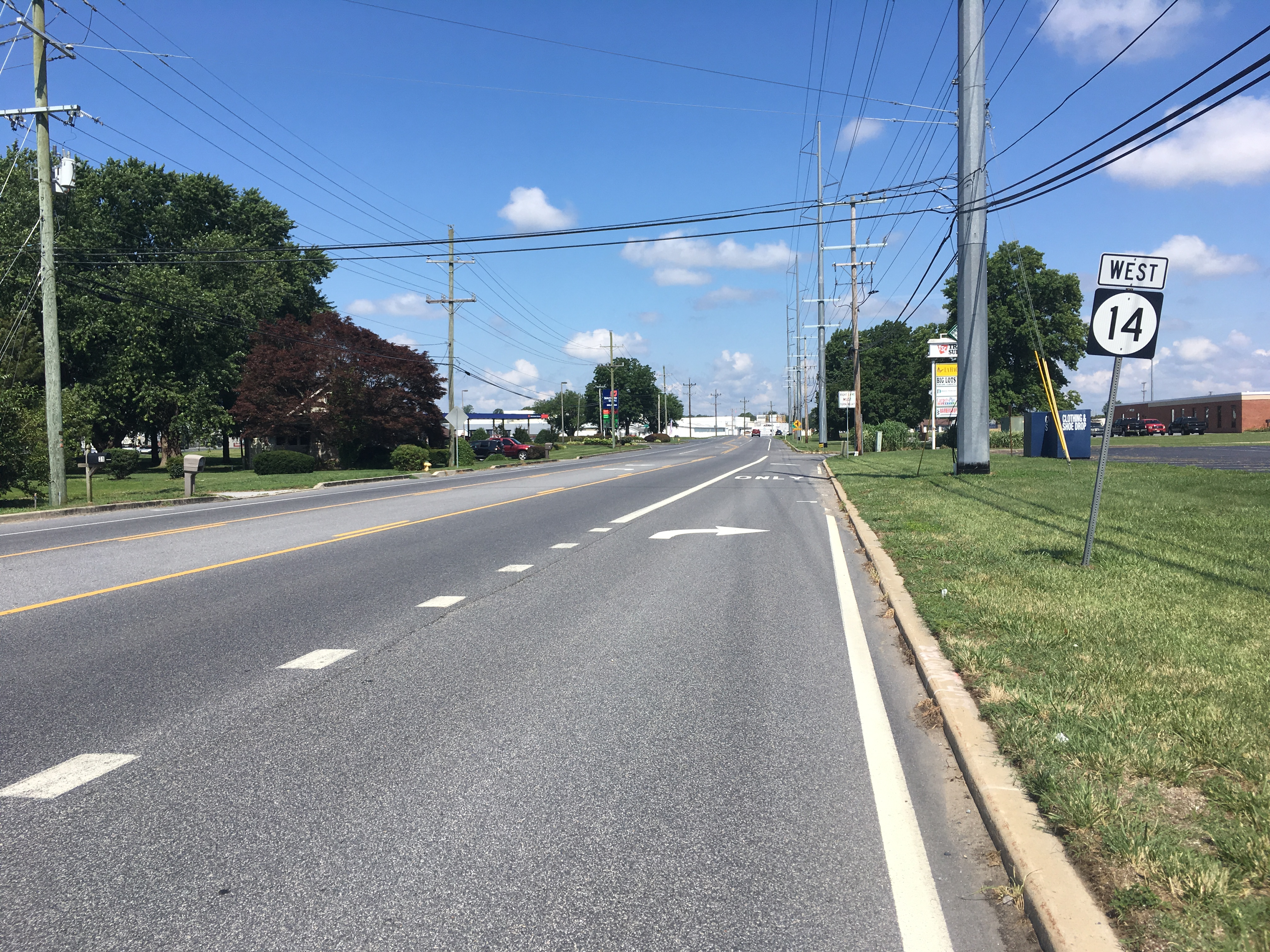
DE 14 westbound past US 113 in Milford

Past this intersection, the route leaves Harrington and becomes Milford Harrington Highway, heading through a mix of farms and woods with some residential development and crossing Browns Branch. The road continues east through more rural areas, intersecting Killens Pond Road/Deep Grass Lane before passing to the north of the town of Houston. Broad Street heads south from the route to provide access to Houston. Farther east, DE 14 bends southeast and intersects the southern terminus of DE 15, crossing into the city of Milford. The road enters commercial areas, passing south of the Milford Solar Farm, and gains a center left-turn lane, coming to an intersection with US 113. Past this intersection, the route becomes Northwest Front Street and runs past homes and businesses a short distance to the north of the Delmarva Central Railroad's Indian River Subdivision line and Silver Lake along the Mispillion River, narrowing back to two lanes. The road curves to the east, passing to the south of the Parson Thorne Mansion, and heads through the downtown of Milford, becoming Northeast Front Street at the junction with North Walnut Street. DE 14 passes a short distance to the north of the Mispillion River, curving northeast and coming to an intersection with DE 1 Bus. Past this intersection, the route runs through areas of farmland with some commercial development, ending at an interchange with the DE 1 bypass of Milford. At this interchange, access to and from southbound DE 1 is provided by South Silicato Parkway. The road continues as New Wharf Road past the interchange.

The section of DE 14 west of US 113 serves as part of a secondary hurricane evacuation route from coastal areas in southern Delaware. The section of the route between Maple Avenue and DE 1 in Milford is designated as part of the Delaware Bayshore Byway, a Delaware Byway and National Scenic Byway. DE 14 has an annual average daily traffic count ranging from a high of 15,509 vehicles at the US 113 intersection to a low of 2,358 vehicles at the eastern terminus at DE 1.

== History ==
What would become DE 14 originally existed as a county road between the Maryland border in Burrsville and Rehoboth Beach by 1920. By 1924, the road was built as a state highway between Burrsville and Milford and was proposed as one between Nassau and Rehoboth Beach. A year later, the state road was completed between Milford and Cedar Creek and from Nassau to just west of Rehoboth Beach, with the sections between Cedar Creek and Nassau and into Rehoboth Beach under proposal. A bascule bridge was constructed over the Lewes and Rehoboth Canal in Rehoboth Beach in 1926. In 1927, the state highway between Milford and Rehoboth Beach was finished with the construction of a bascule bridge over the Broadkill River.

In 1931, a state gravel road was extended from Bethany Beach to the Indian River Inlet along the Atlantic Ocean, providing access to the inlet for recreational purposes. By this time, the county road between Rehoboth Beach and Dewey Beach was paved. In January 1933, bids were made for construction of a gravel road from Dewey Beach south to the Indian River Inlet as well as for a timber bridge across the inlet, connecting with the gravel road between the Indian River Inlet and Bethany Beach. This gravel road would provide a direct connection between Bethany Beach and Rehoboth Beach and would provide better access to the Atlantic coast for recreation. The Ocean Highway between Bethany Beach and Rehoboth Beach was completed in 1933. In fall of that year, the roadway between Bethany Beach and Indian River Inlet was paved, with recommendations to pave the road north from the Indian River Inlet toward Rehoboth Beach. In 1934, the Ocean Highway between the Indian River Inlet and Rehoboth Beach was paved. The same year, recommendations were made to extend the Ocean Highway south from Bethany Beach to Fenwick Island, where it would lead to a Maryland state highway continuing to Ocean City.

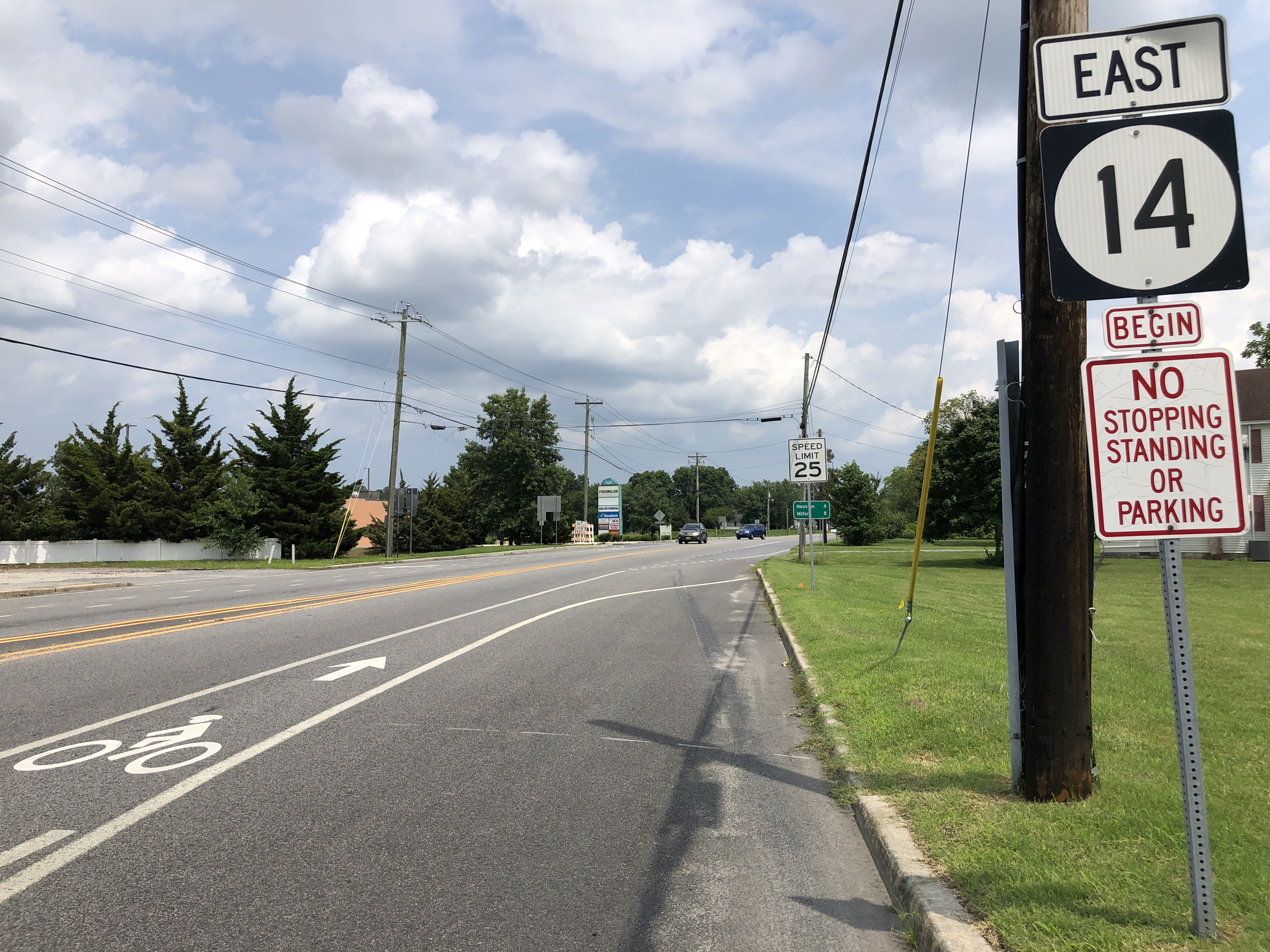
DE 14 eastbound past US 13 in Harrington

DE 14 was designated to run from the Maryland state line in Burrsville east to DE 26 in Bethany Beach by 1936. In 1939, a southern extension of DE 14 was built between Bethany Beach and the Maryland state line in Fenwick Island as a gravel road. In 1940, a swing bridge opened across the Indian River Inlet. The same year, work began for a bypass of the route between Dewey Beach and west of Rehoboth Beach, which included a bascule bridge over the Lewes and Rehoboth Canal. In 1942, the Rehoboth Beach bypass for DE 14 was completed. In addition, the roadway was paved between Fenwick Island and Bethany Beach by that year. In 1952, a new swing bridge opened across the Indian River Inlet after the previous bridge was destroyed by ice and tides in 1948.

The route was widened into a divided highway between DE 18 (now US 9/DE 404) in Nassau and Rehoboth Beach in 1954 in order to provide relief to traffic heading to the beaches. Channelized intersections were built at DE 18 in Nassau and Rehoboth Avenue in Rehoboth Beach. As part of this widening, DE 14 was moved to a new alignment to bypass Wescoats Corner, removing a concurrency with DE 18; the bypassed alignment is now US 9 Bus. (which replaced DE 18) and Wescoats Road. In 1956, DE 14 was realigned slightly north to its current alignment in Burrsville to meet a new routing of MD 317; the former alignment is now Knife Box Road. In 1965, a new dual bridge was constructed across the Indian River Inlet. By 1966, DE 14A was designated onto the former alignment of DE 14 through Rehoboth Beach. The divided highway portion of DE 14 was extended north from DE 18 to DE 16, which included a bypass of Nassau, and between the Indian River Inlet and South Bethany in 1967. The former alignment through Nassau is now Nassau Road. In 1971, the divided Miford Bypass between DE 14 southeast of Milford and US 113 north of Milford was completed. In 1971, a contract was awarded to widen DE 14 to a divided highway between Fenwick Island and South Bethany. This widening project was completed a year later. In 1973, construction was underway to make DE 14 a divided highway from the Milford Bypass to DE 16, which included a bypass of Argos Corner; this was completed in 1974. The former alignment through Argos Corner is now Argos Corner Road.

In 1974, DE 1 was signed concurrent with DE 14 east of Milford and on the Milford Bypass. In 1977, DE 14 was truncated to the southern terminus of the Milford Bypass southeast of Milford, with DE 1 replacing the route between Fenwick Island and the south end of the Milford Bypass and DE 1 Bus. becoming concurrent with route between the Milford Bypass and Northeast Front Street. As a result of this, DE 14A was renumbered to DE 1A. DE 14 was realigned to follow Northeast Front Street to end at DE 1 on the Milford Bypass by 1984. On March 26, 2018, a groundbreaking ceremony was held to construct an interchange at the eastern terminus at DE 1 in Milford, with Governor John Carney, U.S. Senator Tom Carper, U.S. Representative Lisa Blunt Rochester, and DelDOT secretary Jennifer Cohan in attendance. Construction of the interchange at DE 1 in Milford eliminated the at-grade intersection and also built a connector road from DE 14 to Northeast 10th Street. A ribbon-cutting ceremony for the interchange at DE 1 took place on May 18, 2019, with DelDOT secretary Cohan, Senator Carper, and State Representative Bryan Shupe in attendance.

== Major intersections ==
The entire route is in Kent County.

Location	mi	km	Destinations	Notes
	0.00	0.00	MD 317 west (Burrsville Road) – Denton	Maryland state line; western terminus
Harrington	8.59	13.82	DE 14 Truck east (Farmington Road) – Farmington	Western terminus of DE 14 Truck
Harrington	9.66	15.55	US 13 / DE 14 Truck west (South Dupont Highway) – Dover, Greenwood, Bridgeville	Eastern terminus of DE 14 Truck
Milford	15.80	25.43	DE 15 north (Canterbury Road) – Canterbury, Dover	Southern terminus of DE 15
Milford	17.08	27.49	US 113 (Dupont Boulevard) – Dover, Georgetown	
Milford	18.53	29.82	DE 1 Bus. (North Rehoboth Boulevard) – Dover, Lewes, Rehoboth Beach	
Milford	19.47	31.33	DE 1 (Milford Bypass)	Interchange; eastern terminus; access to and from southbound DE 1 via South Silicato Parkway
1.000 mi = 1.609 km; 1.000 km = 0.621 mi

== Special routes ==
=== DE 14 Truck ===
Delaware Route 14 Truck
- Location: Harrington
- Length: 3.9 mi (6.3 km)
- Existed: 2008–present

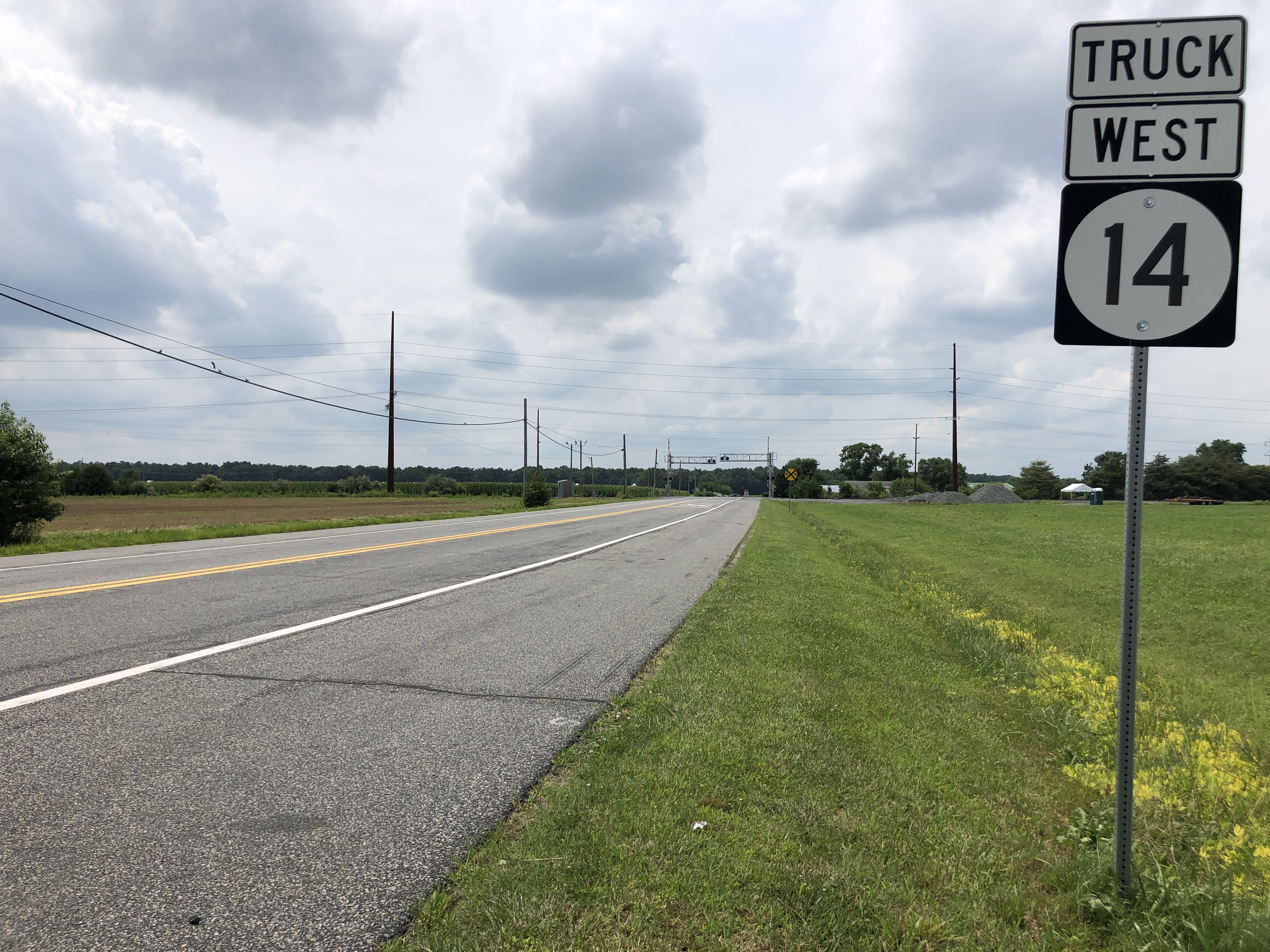
DE 14 Truck westbound past US 13 in Harrington

Delaware Route 14 Truck (DE 14 Truck) is a truck bypass of DE 14 in Harrington. The route heads south from DE 14 on two-lane undivided Farmington Road, leaving Harrington and heading through farmland. DE 14 Truck turns east onto Tower Hill Road and crosses the Delmarva Central Railroad's Delmarva Subdivision line at-grade before coming to an intersection with US 13. At this point, the truck route turns north to form a concurrency with US 13 on South Dupont Highway, a four-lane divided highway. The road heads back into Harrington and runs through commercial areas, passing to the east of the Delaware State Fairgrounds, which is where the Delaware State Fair is held and the Harrington Raceway & Casino and Centre Ice Rink are located. US 13/DE 14 Truck crosses the Delmarva Central Railroad's Indian River Subdivision line at-grade, with the median widening to include businesses in it. DE 14 Truck ends at another intersection with DE 14. On March 24, 2007, construction began on a truck bypass of Harrington along Farmington Road, Tower Hill Road, and US 13 by making road improvements to accommodate truck traffic such as widening pavement and work on turning and acceleration lanes. The project, which cost $8.5 million, was completed on August 20, 2008, with Senator Carper and other officials in attendance for a ribbon-cutting ceremony. DE 14 Truck was designated in 2008 onto the truck bypass of Harrington.

Major intersections

The entire route is in Harrington, Kent County.

mi	km	Destinations	Notes
0.0	0.0	DE 14 (Walt Messick Road) to US 13	Western terminus
1.9	3.1	US 13 south (South Dupont Highway) – Greenwood, Bridgeville	West end of US 13 overlap
3.9	6.3	US 13 north (South Dupont Highway) – Dover; DE 14 (Clark Street/Milford Harrington Highway) – Denton, Harrington, Houston, Milford	Eastern terminus
1.000 mi = 1.609 km; 1.000 km = 0.621 mi: Concurrency terminus

=== Former DE 14A ===
Delaware Route 14A
- Location: Dewey Beach–Rehoboth Beach
- Length: 2.01 mi (3.23 km)
- Existed: 1966–1977

Delaware Route 14A (DE 14A) was the designation of the former alignment of DE 14 through Dewey Beach and Rehoboth Beach. The route began at DE 14 in Dewey Beach and headed north into Rehoboth Beach, where it turned to the west and intersected DE 14 again west of Rehoboth Beach. The route was a former segment of DE 14 that was bypassed by 1942 and received the DE 14A designation by 1966. By 1974, the route became cosigned with DE 1A, with DE 1A replacing DE 14A in 1977.
