= Quakertown =

Quakertown may refer to:

- Quakertown, Delaware
- Quakertown, Indiana
- Quakertown, New Jersey
- Quakertown, Pennsylvania
- Quakertown, Denton, Texas
