= List of Delaware fire departments =

The fire departments in Delaware are members of the Delaware Volunteer Firemen's Association, with the exception of the fire brigades and airport fire departments. The City of Wilmington fire department is an associate member.

== New Castle County ==
Fire Department	Town/City	Station Number	Founded	Image
Volunteer Hose Co.	Middletown	Station 1	September 30, 1887	
Mill Creek Fire Co.	Pike Creek	Station 2	January 6, 1927	
Christiana Fire Co.	Christiana	Station 3	October 7, 1921	
Odessa Fire Co.	Odessa	Station 4	1926	
Christiana Fire Co.	Christiana	Station 6	October 7, 1921	
Aetna Hose, Hook, & Ladder Co.	Newark	Station 7	December 17, 1888	
Aetna Hose, Hook, & Ladder Co.	Newark	Station 8	December 17, 1888	
Aetna Hose, Hook, & Ladder Co.	Newark	Station 9	December 17, 1888	Aetna Hose, Hook and Ladder Company Fire Station No. 2 Apr 10
Aetna Hose, Hook, & Ladder Co.	Newark	Station 10	December 17, 1888	
Brandywine Hundred Fire Co.	Bellefonte	Station 11	March 19, 1924	
Christiana Fire Co.	Christiana	Station 12	October 7, 1921	
Claymont Fire Co.	Claymont	Station 13	January 5, 1928	
Cranston Heights Fire Co.	Cranston Heights	Station 14	November 16, 1919	
Delaware City Fire Co.	Delaware City	Station 15 (One Five)	March 17, 1887^{[a]}	
Elsmere Fire Co.	Elsmere	Station 16	March 18, 1921	
Five Points Fire Co.	Five Points	Station 17	May 7, 1921	
Good Will Fire Co.	New Castle	Station 18	1907	
Hockessin Fire Co.	Hockessin	Station 19	October 15, 1936	
Holloway Terrace Fire Co.	Holloway Terrace	Station 20	September 20, 1921	
Mill Creek Fire Co.	Marshallton	Station 21	January 6, 1927	
Minquadale Fire Co.	Minquadale	Station 22	1925^{[b]}	
Minquas Fire Co.	Newport	Station 23	May 21, 1907^{[c]}	Minquas FD Newport DE
Odessa Fire Co.	Odessa	Station 24	1926	
Talleyville Fire Co.	Talleyville	Station 25	October 24, 1928	
Townsend Fire Co.	Townsend	Station 26	1926	
Volunteer Hose Co.	Middletown	Station 27	September 30, 1887	
Wilmington Manor Fire Co.	Wilmington Manor	Station 28	November 13, 1945	
Port Penn Fire Co.	Port Penn	Station 29	August 14, 1951^{[d]}	
Belvedere Fire Co.	Belvedere	Station 30	1949	
Wilmington Manor Fire Co.	Wilmington Manor	Station 32	November 13, 1945	
Delaware Air National Guard, New Castle County Airport Crash Fire Rescue	Wilmington Manor New Castle County Airport	Station 33		
Delaware City Refinery Fire Department	Delaware City PBF Energy	Station 34		
Dupont - Chestnut Run Plaza	Wilmington DuPont	Station 35-1		
FMC - Stine Research Center	Newark FMC Corporation	Station 35-3		NCC Station 35-3
Dupont - Experimental Station Laboratories	Wilmington DuPont	Station 35-8		
Christiana Care Fire Protection	Christiana	Station 37		
Winterthur Museum Fire Brigade	Wilmington Winterthur Museum	Station 38		
Wilmington Fire Dept.	Wilmington	Station 1	November 30, 1921	Wilm DE Fire Station 1
Wilmington Fire Dept.	Wilmington	Station 2	November 30, 1921	
Wilmington Fire Dept.	Wilmington	Station 3	November 30, 1921	
Wilmington Fire Dept.	Wilmington	Station 4	November 30, 1921	
Wilmington Fire Dept.	Wilmington	Station 5	November 30, 1921	
Wilmington Fire Dept.	Wilmington	Station 6	November 30, 1921	
Wilmington Fire Dept.	Wilmington	Station 7	November 30, 1921	

- ^{1} Originally organized as "Volunteer Fire Company" on March 17, 1887 and later underwent a name change to "Delaware City Hose Company" on January 23, 1889. There was a disrupted period of inactivity where there was no organized fire company and the Delaware City Fire Company was reorganized on July 9, 1924, however, the company uses the initial date of organization for the previous company in 1887.
- ^{2} Originally organized as the "Minquas Civic Association and Fire Company" and later changed their name to "Minquadale Fire Company, Inc." in 1929 to avoid confusion with Minquas of Newport.
- ^{3} Originally organized as "Nonesuch Fire Company" and changed their name one month later to "Minquas Fire Company."
- ^{4} Originally organized as "Augustine Beach Fire Company" and changed their name on December 3, 1957 to "Port Penn Volunteer Fire Company."

== Kent County ==
Fire Department	Town/City	Station Number	Image
Bowers Fire Co.	Bowers Beach	Station 40	
Camden-Wyoming Fire Co.	Camden	Station 41	
Carlisle Fire Co.	Milford	Station 42 - Station 1	
Carlisle Fire Co.	Milford	Station 42 - Station 2	
Cheswold Fire Co.	Cheswold	Station 43	
Citizens Hose Co.	Smyrna	Station 44	
Clayton Fire Co.	Clayton	Station 45	
Dover Fire Department	Dover	Station 46 - Station 1	
Dover Fire Department	Dover	Station 46 - Station 2	
Farmington Fire Co.	Farmington	Station 47	
Felton Fire Co.	Felton	Station 48	
Frederica Fire Co.	Frederica	Station 49	
Harrington Fire Co.	Harrington	Station 50	
Hartly Fire Co.	Hartly	Station 51	
Houston Fire Co.	Houston	Station 52	
Leipsic Fire Co.	Leipsic	Station 53	
Little Creek Fire Co.	Little Creek	Station 54	
Magnolia Fire Co.	Magnolia	Station 55	
Marydel Fire Co.	Marydel	Station 56	
South Bowers Fire Co.	Thompsonville	Station 57	
Dover Air Force Base Crash, Fire, Rescue	Dover Air Force Base	Station 58	
Energizer/Playex, Fire Brigade, EMS	Dover	(No Station Number)	

== Sussex County ==
Fire Department	Town/City	Station Number	Image
Bethany Beach Fire Co.	Bethany Beach	Station 70 - Station 1	
Bethany Beach Fire Co.	Fenwick Island	Station 70 - Station 2	
Blades Fire Co.	Blades	Station 71	
Bridgeville Fire Co.	Bridgeville	Station 72	
Dagsboro Fire Co.	Dagsboro	Station 73	
Delmar Fire Co.	Delmar	Station 74	
Ellendale Fire Co.	Ellendale	Station 75 - Station 1	Ellendale Fire Company
Ellendale Fire Co.	Lincoln City	Station 75 - Station 2	Fire station in Lincoln City, Delaware
Frankford Fire Co.	Frankford	Station 76	
Georgetown Fire Co.	Georgetown	Station 77	
Greenwood Fire Co.	Greenwood	Station 78	
Gumboro Fire Co.	Gumboro	Station 79	
Indian River Fire Co.	Oak Orchard	Station 80 - Station 1	
Indian River Fire Co.	Long Neck	Station 80 - Station 2	
Laurel Fire Co.	Laurel	Station 81 - Station 1	
Laurel Fire Co.	Sycamore	Station 81 - Station 2	
Lewes Fire Co.	Lewes	Station 82 - Station 1	
Lewes Fire Co.	Nassau	Station 82 - Station 2	
Lewes Fire Co.	Angola	Station 82 - Station 3*	
Millsboro Fire Co.	Millsboro	Station 83	
Millville Fire Co.	Millville	Station 84 - Station 1	
Millville Fire Co.	Clarksville	Station 84 - Station 2	
Milton Fire Co.	Milton	Station 85	The Milton Fire Department was organized on November 14, 1901 and this modern station was built in 1949.
Rehoboth Beach Fire Co.	Rehoboth Beach	Station 86 - Station 1	
Rehoboth Beach Fire Co.	Rehoboth Beach	Station 86 - Station 2	
Rehoboth Beach Fire Co.	Angola	Station 86 - Station 3*	
Seaford Fire Co.	Seaford	Station 87	
Selbyville Fire Co.	Selbyville	Station 88	
Memorial Fire Co.	Slaughter Beach	Station 89 - Station 1	
Memorial Fire Co.	Argo's Corner	Station 89 - Station 2	
Roxana Fire Co.	Roxana	Station 90	

- Lewes Station 3 and Rehoboth Beach Station 3 is a joint station housing apparatus from both fire departments in the same building on John J. Williams Highway in Angola.

== Defunct ==
Fire Department	Town/City	Service Time	Image	Notes
Brandywine Fire Co.	Wilmington	1850s		Chartered in the city's Ninth Ward, the charter was relinquished in the 1850s. A new iteration was started in the Ninth Ward some fifty-plus years later utilizing the same charter.
Brandywine Fire Co. No. 10	Wilmington	1901 - November 30, 1921		Restarted under the same charter as the previous Brandywine Fire Co. in 1901, officially recognized by the city of Wilmington in June 1902. dissolved into the newly established Wilmington Fire Department when fire protection was taken over by the city.
Delaware Fire Co. No. 3	Wilmington	April 22, 1819 - November 30, 1921		Dissolved into the newly established Wilmington Fire Department when fire protection was taken over by the city.
Fame Fire Co. No. 6	Wilmington	January 1, 1839 - September 1, 1920		Quit service to the City of Wilmington on September 1, 1920 with no notice given.
Fort Miles Fire	Lewes			United States Army fire company
Friendship Fire Co. No. 1	Wilmington	December 22, 1775 - September 1, 1920		Dissolved at midnight September 1, 1920 after giving the City of Wilmington notice and offering the city first option on its apparatus.
Independence Fire Co. No. 12	Wilmington	? - November 30, 1921		Dissolved into the newly established Wilmington Fire Department when fire protection was taken over by the city.
Lakeview Hook and Ladder Co.	Wyoming	August 20, 1890 - 1927		Started as the Lakeview Hook and Ladder Company on August 20, 1890. The name was changed to the Wyoming Fire Company in 1916 and continued to operate until merging with the Rescue Hook and Ladder Company of Camden to become the current Camden-Wyoming Fire Company.
Lenape Fire Co.	New Castle	April 1887 - April 1906		Disbanded after waning interest and lack of funds for several years, property was seized and sold at sheriff sale Saturday, April 21, 1906.
Liberty Fire Co. No. 9	Wilmington	February 12, 1891 - September 1, 1920		Quit service to the City of Wilmington on September 1, 1920 with no notice given.
Penn Fire Co.	New Castle	1820 - ?		Organized in 1820, incorporated February 6, 1823, unknown date of disbandment.
Phoenix Fire Co. No. 4	Wilmington	January 26, 1835 - September 1, 1920		Quit service to the City of Wilmington on September 1, 1920 with no notice given.
Reliance Fire Co. No. 2	Wilmington	March 6, 1796 - November 30, 1921		Dissolved into the newly established Wilmington Fire Department when fire protection was taken over by the city.
Rescue Fire Co. No. 1	Seaford			Municipal fire department run by the town of Seaford prior to the establishment of the volunteer fire department in 1901.
Rescue Fire Co. No. 10	Wilmington	November 22, 1901- 1902		Chartered in November 1901 and procured a steam fire engine in December 1901, responded to fires in the Ninth Ward in 1902 while competing with the Brandywine and Independence fire companies for recognition, never formally recognized by the city of Wilmington and disbanded.
Rescue Hook and Ladder Co.	Camden	February 4, 1865 - 1927		Small volunteer fire company that merged with Wyoming (formerly Lakeview Hook and Ladder) Fire Co. to become the current Camden-Wyoming Fire Co.
Riverside Fire Co.	Dobbinsville	Spring 1948 - ?		Small volunteer fire company in the Dobbinsville neighborhood of the town of New Castle, active at least through 1950, but never admitted entrance to county or state fire associations.
Union Fire Co.	New Castle	March 1796 - ?		Organized in March 1796, incorporated January 1804, unknown date of disbandment.
Union Fire Co. No. 11	Wilmington	? - November 30, 1921		Dissolved into the newly established Wilmington Fire Department when fire protection was taken over by the city.
Washington Fire Co. No. 7	Wilmington	January 4, 1840 - September 1, 1920		Quit service to the City of Wilmington on September 1, 1920 with no notice given.
Water Witch Fire Co. No. 5	Wilmington	January 22, 1835 - August 9, 1885; April 12, 1893 - November 30, 1921		Dissolved into the newly established Wilmington Fire Department when fire protection was taken over by the city.
Weccacoe Fire Co. No. 8	Wilmington	July 16, 1869 - September 1, 1920		Quit service to the City of Wilmington on September 1, 1920 with no notice given.
Woodcrest Fire Co.	Newport	1941 - November, 1958		Located on Boxwood Avenue off Boxwood Road, established as a Civil Defense FD in WW2, chartered as a regular FD in 1945
