= Point Branch =

Stream in Delaware, USA

Point Branch Tributary to Prospect Branch
- Location of Point Branch mouth Point Branch (the United States)

Location
- Country: United States
- State: Delaware
- County: Kent

Physical characteristics
- Source: Booth Branch divide
  - location: about 1-mile southeast of Andrewsville, Delaware
  - coordinates: 38°51′17.41″N 075°36′48.74″W
  - elevation: 62 ft (19 m)
- Mouth: Prospect Branch
  - location: about 1-mile south-southeast of Vernon, Delaware
  - coordinates: 38°52′46.41″N 075°38′37.74″W
  - elevation: 39 ft (12 m)
- Length: 3.45 mi (5.55 km)
- Basin size: 2.01 square miles (5.2 km^{2})
- Discharge
  - location: Prospect Branch
  - average: 2.49 cu ft/s (0.071 m^{3}/s) at mouth with Prospect Branch

Basin features
- Progression: Prospect Branch → Marshyhope Creek → Nanticoke River → Chesapeake Bay → Atlantic Ocean
- River system: Nanticoke River
- Tributaries
  - left: unnamed tributaries
  - right: unnamed tributaries
- Bridges: Andrewville Road, Prospect Church Road

Point Branch is a 3.45 mi (5.55 km) long first-order tributary to Prospect Branch in Kent County, Delaware. This is the only stream of this name in the United States.

== Course ==
Point Branch rises on the Booth Branch divide about 1-mile southeast of Andrewsville, Delaware, and then flows south and west to join Prospect Branch about 1-mile south-southeast of Vernon, Delaware.

== Watershed ==
Point Branch drains 2.01 square miles (5.2 km^{2}) of area, receives about 45.2 in/year of precipitation, and is about 1% forested.

== See also ==
- List of rivers of Delaware
