= Saulsbury Creek (Marshyhope Creek tributary) =

Stream in Delaware, USA

Saulsbury Creek Tributary to Marshyhope Creek
- Location of Saulsbury Creek mouth Saulsbury Creek (Marshyhope Creek tributary) (the United States)

Location
- Country: United States
- State: Delaware; Maryland
- County: Kent (DE); Caroline (MD)

Physical characteristics
- Source: Herring Run divide
  - location: about 2 miles northwest of Hickman, Delaware
  - coordinates: 38°51′9.00″N 075°44′27.00″W
  - elevation: 54 ft (16 m)
- Mouth: Marshyhope Creek
  - location: Adamsville, Delaware
  - coordinates: 38°50′2.41″N 075°41′7.75″W
  - elevation: 33 ft (10 m)
- Length: 4.09 mi (6.58 km)
- Basin size: 11.55 square miles (29.9 km^{2})
- Discharge
  - location: Marshyhope Creek
  - average: 14.04 cu ft/s (0.398 m^{3}/s) at mouth with Marshyhope Creek

Basin features
- Progression: Marshyhope Creek → Nanticoke River → Chesapeake Bay → Atlantic Ocean
- River system: Nanticoke River
- Tributaries
  - left: Cattail Branch
  - right: unnamed tributaries
- Bridges: Hobbs Road, Cattail Branch Road, Burrsville Road

Saulsbury Creek is a 4.09 mi (6.58 km) long third-order tributary to Marshyhope Creek in Kent County, Delaware and Caroline County, Maryland.

== Variant names ==
According to the Geographic Names Information System, it has also been known historically as:

- Kirks Branch
- Saulisbury Creek

== Course ==
Saulsbury Creek rises on the Herring Run divide about 2 miles northwest of Hickman, Delaware, and then flows generally southeast to join Marshyhope Creek at Adamsville, Delaware.

== Watershed ==
Saulsbury Creek drains 11.85 square miles (30.7 km^{2}) of area, receives about 44.2 in/year of precipitation, and is about 8.55% forested.

== See also ==
- List of rivers of Delaware
