= Prospect Branch (Marshyhope Creek tributary) =

Stream in Delaware, USA

Prospect Branch Tributary to Marshyhope Creek
- Location of Prospect Branch mouth Prospect Branch (Marshyhope Creek tributary) (the United States)

Location
- Country: United States
- State: Delaware
- County: Kent

Physical characteristics
- Source: Browns Branch divide
  - location: about 1-mile west of Harrington, Delaware
  - coordinates: 38°55′15.41″N 075°36′25.74″W
  - elevation: 61 ft (19 m)
- Mouth: Marshyhope Creek
  - location: about 1.5 miles northwest of Adamsville, Delaware
  - coordinates: 38°52′32.41″N 075°38′55.74″W
  - elevation: 39 ft (12 m)
- Length: 4.61 mi (7.42 km)
- Basin size: 14.42 square miles (37.3 km^{2})
- Discharge
  - location: Marshyhope Creek
  - average: 17.86 cu ft/s (0.506 m^{3}/s) at mouth with Marshyhope Creek

Basin features
- Progression: Marshyhope Creek → Nanticoke River → Chesapeake Bay → Atlantic Ocean
- River system: Nanticoke River
- Tributaries
  - left: Bright Haines Glade Branch; Point Branch
  - right: unnamed tributaries
- Bridges: Cornish Road, Hemping Road, DE 14

Prospect Branch is a 4.61 mi (7.42 km) long third-order tributary to Marshyhope Creek in Kent County, Delaware.

== Course ==
Prospect Branch rises on the Browns Branch divide about 1-mile west of Harrington, Delaware, and then flows generally southwest to join Marshyhope Creek about 1.5 miles northwest of Adamsville, Delaware.

== Watershed ==
Prospect Branch drains 14.42 square miles (37.3 km^{2}) of area, receives about 45.2 in/year of precipitation, and is about 6.85% forested.

== See also ==
- List of rivers of Delaware
