= Burrsville =

Burrsville may refer to:

- Burrsville, Maryland
- Burrsville, New Jersey
