= Cattail Branch (Saulsbury Creek tributary) =

Stream in Delaware, US

Cattail Branch Tributary to Saulsbury Creek
- Location of Cattail Branch mouth Cattail Branch (Saulsbury Creek tributary) (the United States)

Location
- Country: United States
- State: Delaware
- County: Kent

Physical characteristics
- Source: Green Branch divide
  - location: about 1 mile west-northwest of Layton Corners, Delaware
  - coordinates: 38°54′26.41″N 075°42′33.75″W
  - elevation: 60 ft (18 m)
- Mouth: Saulsbury Creek
  - location: about 0.5 miles north of Adamsville, Delaware
  - coordinates: 38°50′18.41″N 075°41′30.75″W
  - elevation: 36 ft (11 m)
- Length: 5.85 mi (9.41 km)
- Basin size: 7.44 square miles (19.3 km^{2})
- Discharge
  - location: Saulsbury Creek
  - average: 8.83 cu ft/s (0.250 m^{3}/s) at mouth with Marshyhope Creek

Basin features
- Progression: Saulsbury Creek → Marshyhope Creek → Nanticoke River → Chesapeake Bay → Atlantic Ocean
- River system: Nanticoke River
- Tributaries
  - left: unnamed tributaries
  - right: unnamed tributaries
- Bridges: Layton Corners Road, DE 14, High Stump Road, Cattail Branch Road

Cattail Branch is a 5.85 mi (9.41 km) long third-order tributary to Saulsbury Creek in Kent County, Delaware.

== Variant names ==
According to the Geographic Names Information System, it has also been known historically as:

- Cat Tail Branch

== Course ==
Cattail Branch rises on the Green Branch divide about 1-mile west-northwest of Layton Corners, Delaware, and then flows generally south to join Saulsbury Creek about 0.5 miles north of Adamsville, Delaware.

== Watershed ==
Cattail Branch drains 7.44 square miles (19.3 km^{2}) of area, receives about 44.7 in/year of precipitation, and is about 5.83% forested.

== See also ==
- List of rivers of Delaware
