= Maryland Route 317 =

State highway in Maryland, United States

Maryland Route 317
- Burrsville Road
- Maryland Route 317 highlighted in red

Route information
- Maintained by MDSHA
- Length: 4.78 mi (7.69 km)
- Existed: 1927–present

Major junctions
- West end: MD 313 in Oil City
- East end: DE 14 in Burrsville

Location
- Country: United States
- State: Maryland
- Counties: Caroline

Highway system
- Maryland highway system; Interstate; US; State; Scenic Byways
← MD 316	→ MD 318

Maryland Route 317 (MD 317) is a state highway in the U.S. state of Maryland. Known as Burrsville Road, the state highway runs 4.78 miles (7.69 km) from MD 313 in Oil City east to the Delaware state line in Burrsville, where the highway continues east as Delaware Route 14 (DE 14). MD 317 was constructed in the mid-1920s and realigned through Burrsville around 1960.

== Route description ==
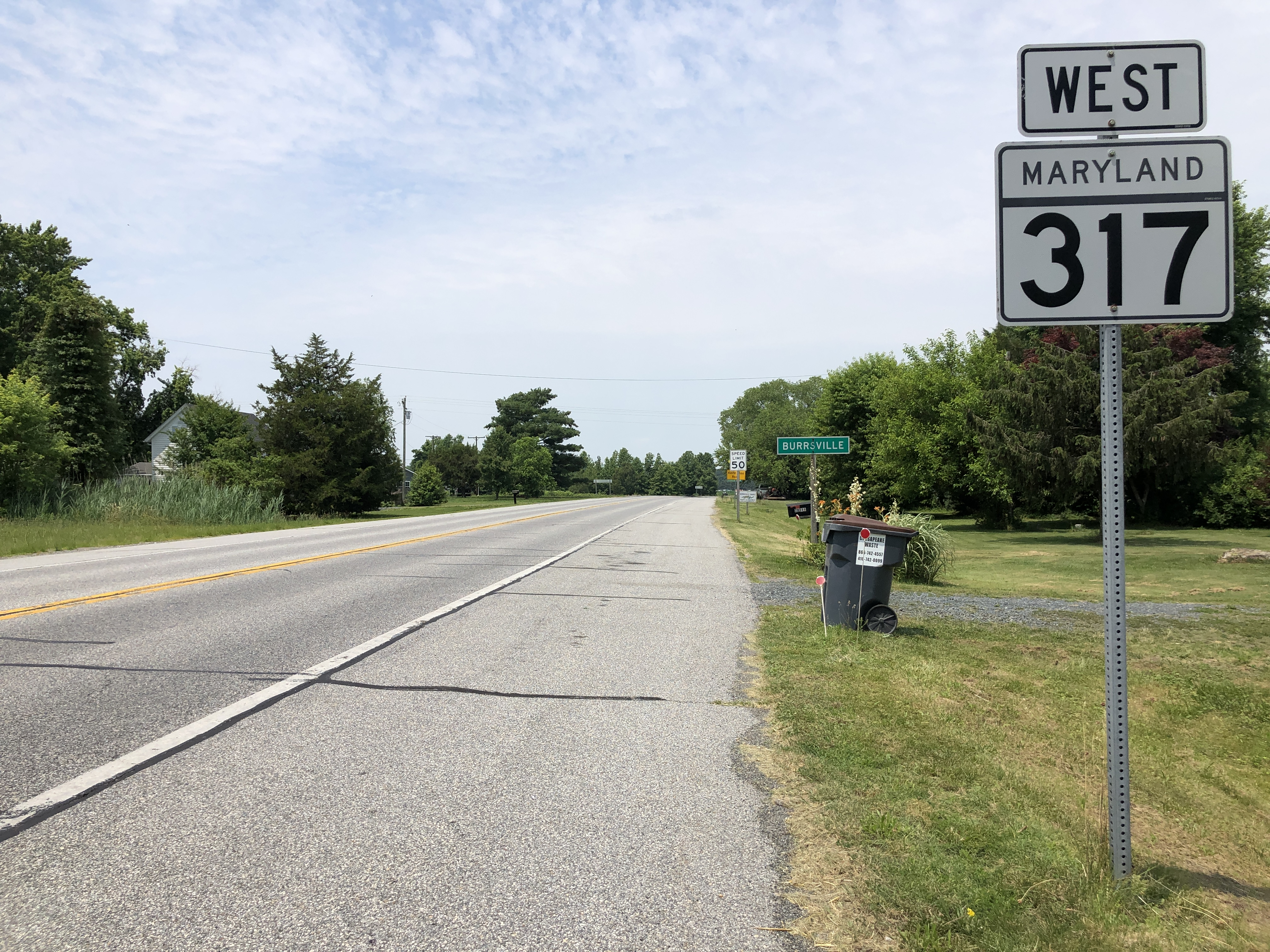
View west at the east end of MD 317 at DE 14 at the Delaware border in Burrsville

MD 317 begins at an intersection with MD 313 (Greensboro Road) in Oil City. The state highway heads east as a two-lane undivided road through farmland. MD 317 crosses Webber Branch before the old alignment, Ruritan Road, splits to the northeast as the highway approaches Burrsville. The old alignment, now part of Knife Box Road, crosses MD 317 again shortly before the route comes to its eastern terminus at the Delaware state line. The highway continues east as DE 14 (Vernon Road) toward the city of Harrington.

== History ==
MD 317 was paved in 1925 and 1926 along its whole length. The state highway originally performed an S-curve through Burrsville, following present day Ruritan Road and Knife Box Road, the latter of which was designated MD 457 north of MD 317 between 1951 and 1960. MD 317 was constructed on its present straight alignment through Burrsville around 1960.

== Junction list ==
The entire route is in Caroline County.

Location	mi	km	Destinations	Notes
Oil City	0.00	0.00	MD 313 (Greensboro Road) – Denton, Greensboro	Western terminus
Burrsville	4.78	7.69	DE 14 east (Vernon Road) – Harrington	Delaware state line; eastern terminus
1.000 mi = 1.609 km; 1.000 km = 0.621 mi
