= Delaware Route 1A =

Highway in Delaware, United States

Delaware Route 1A

Route information
- Maintained by DelDOT
- Length: 2.01 mi (3.23 km)
- Existed: 1974–present

Major junctions
- South end: DE 1 in Dewey Beach
- DE 1B in Rehoboth Beach
- North end: DE 1 near Rehoboth Beach

Location
- Country: United States
- State: Delaware
- Counties: Sussex

Highway system
- Delaware State Route System; List; Byways
← DE 1	→ DE 1B
← DE 14	DE 14A	→ DE 15

Delaware Route 1A (DE 1A) is a state highway in Sussex County, Delaware. The route, which is signed north-south, runs 2.01 mi (3.23 km) from DE 1 in the town of Dewey Beach north to another intersection with DE 1 west of the city of Rehoboth Beach. The route provides access to Rehoboth Beach from DE 1, heading north before turning to the west. DE 1A follows King Charles Avenue, Bayard Avenue, 2nd Street (southbound), Christian Street (northbound), and Rehoboth Avenue.

What is now DE 1A was originally a part of DE 14 between 1936 and 1942. The road was designated DE 14A by 1966. In the 1970s, DE 1A was designated along DE 14A for a few years before DE 14A was decommissioned in favor of DE 1A. Between 2002 and 2006, a streetscape project revitalized the Rehoboth Avenue portion of the route and a roundabout was added at the northern entrance to Rehoboth Beach.

== Route description ==
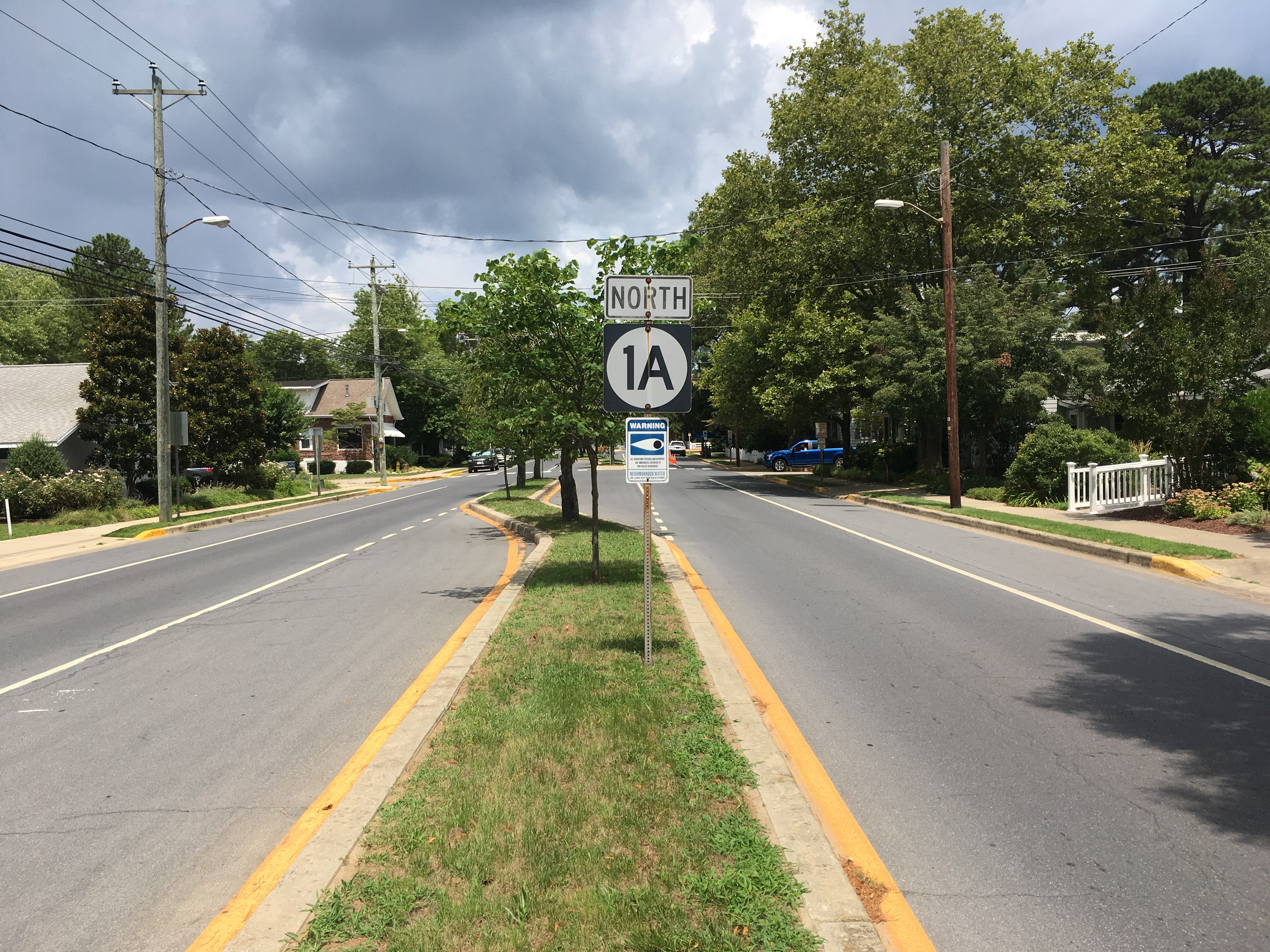
DE 1A northbound on Bayard Avenue in Rehoboth Beach

DE 1A begins at an intersection with DE 1 in the town of Dewey Beach. At this intersection, access from southbound DE 1 to northbound DE 1A is provided via St. Louis Street. From DE 1, the route heads north on two-lane undivided King Charles Avenue. The road passes through residential areas before it leaves Dewey Beach, becoming Silver Lake Drive and curving northwest to run to the south of Silver Lake. The route bends north and crosses the lake, where it enters the city of Rehoboth Beach. Here, the name changes to Bayard Avenue and it becomes a divided highway. DE 1A becomes undivided again and comes to an intersection with Christian Street. At this point, northbound DE 1A turns northwest onto Christian Street to reach Rehoboth Avenue while southbound DE 1A follows 2nd Street north to Rehoboth Avenue; Rehoboth Avenue serves as the main street of Rehoboth Beach that leads east to the Rehoboth Beach Boardwalk along the Atlantic Ocean.

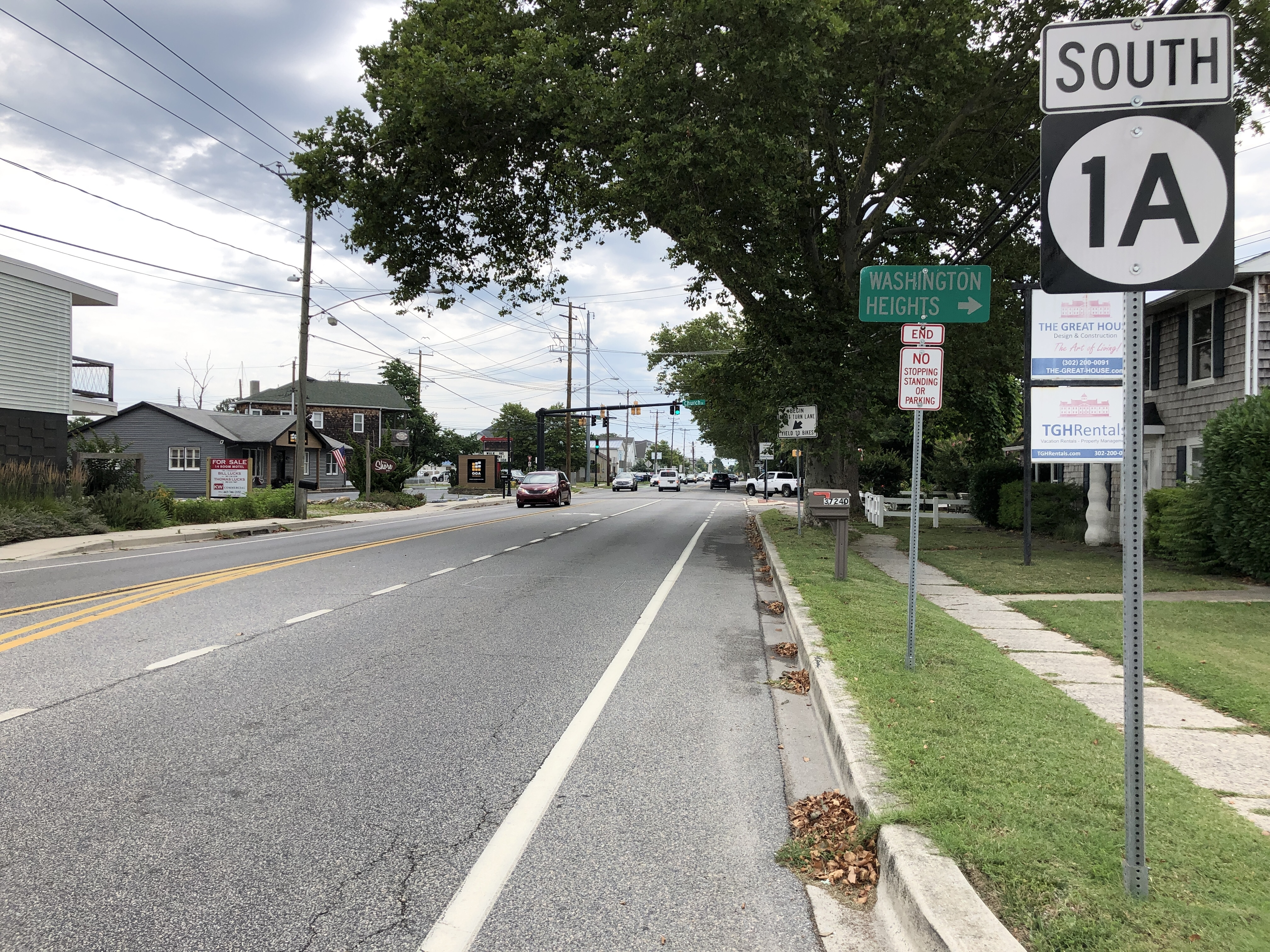
DE 1A southbound approaching Rehoboth Beach

The highway heads west along four-lane divided Rehoboth Avenue and runs past businesses, passing south of the Rehoboth Beach Convention Center. The road intersects DE 1B, which connects to DE 1, before it comes to a roundabout at Grove Street/Columbia Avenue, with Columbia Avenue heading northeast to provide access to the town of Henlopen Acres, the community of North Shores, and the Gordons Pond section of Cape Henlopen State Park. Following this, the route narrows into a two-lane undivided road and passes south of the Rehoboth Beach-Dewey Beach Chamber of Commerce and Visitors Center and the Rehoboth Beach Museum before crossing the Lewes and Rehoboth Canal on a drawbridge and leaving Rehoboth Beach. DE 1A continues west past homes and businesses and ends at another intersection with DE 1. This intersection has no direct access from DE 1A to southbound DE 1. Access to southbound DE 1 from DE 1A is by way of the Rehoboth Avenue Extension service road parallel to DE 1 that provides access to DE 1 at the Sea Blossom Boulevard intersection.

DE 1A has an annual average daily traffic count ranging from a high of 25,168 vehicles just west of Rehoboth Beach to a low of 3,437 vehicles on the Rehoboth Avenue Extension frontage road at the northern terminus at DE 1.

== History ==
Delaware Route 14A
- Location: Dewey Beach–Rehoboth Beach
- Length: 2.01 mi (3.23 km)
- Existed: 1966–1977

What is now DE 1A was originally designated as part of DE 14 by 1936. By 1942, DE 14 was realigned to bypass Rehoboth Beach to the southwest. DE 14A was designated onto the former alignment of DE 14 through Rehoboth Beach by 1966. By 1974, DE 14A became concurrent with DE 1A. The DE 14A designation was dropped in 1977 and the road was solely designated DE 1A.

In October 2002, work began on a streetscape project to revitalize Rehoboth Avenue. The project provided new sidewalks and plants and placed utility lines underground. A roundabout opened at Grove Street/Columbia Avenue in May 2004. The roundabout features a replica of the Cape Henlopen Light and serves as a gateway to Rehoboth Beach. When the roundabout first opened, there were issues of drivers not yielding properly. As a result, improved yield signage was installed. The streetscape project was completed in June 2006, with a ribbon-cutting ceremony held. The project cost $36 million; the Delaware Department of Transportation paid $16.3 million, the city of Rehoboth Beach provided $10 million, and the Federal Highway Administration provided $7.75 million. U.S. Senators Tom Carper and Joe Biden helped secure federal funds for the project.

== Major intersections ==
The entire route is in Sussex County.

Location	mi	km	Destinations	Notes
Dewey Beach	0.00	0.00	DE 1 (Coastal Highway)	Southern terminus; access from southbound DE 1 to northbound DE 1A via St. Louis Street
Rehoboth Beach			DE 1B south (State Road) to DE 1 south	Northern terminus of DE 1B; no access from DE 1B to northbound DE 1A
Rehoboth Beach	2.01	3.23	DE 1 north (Coastal Highway)	Northern terminus; no access from DE 1A to southbound DE 1
1.000 mi = 1.609 km; 1.000 km = 0.621 mi: Incomplete access
