= Bright Haines Glade Branch =

Stream in Delaware, USA

Bright Haines Glade Branch Tributary to Prospect Branch
- Location of Bright Haines Glade Branch mouth Bright Haines Glade Branch (the United States)

Location
- Country: United States
- State: Delaware
- County: Kent

Physical characteristics
- Source: Browns Branch divide
  - location: about 0.5 miles southwest of Harrington, Delaware
  - coordinates: 38°54′41.41″N 075°35′35.73″W
  - elevation: 50 ft (15 m)
- Mouth: Prospect Branch
  - location: about 1-mile southeast of Vernon, Delaware
  - coordinates: 38°53′7.41″N 075°38′25.74″W
  - elevation: 43 ft (13 m)
- Length: 4.13 mi (6.65 km)
- Basin size: 9.54 square miles (24.7 km^{2})
- Discharge
  - location: Prospect Branch
  - average: 11.60 cu ft/s (0.328 m^{3}/s) at mouth with Prospect Branch

Basin features
- Progression: Prospect Branch → Marshyhope Creek → Nanticoke River → Chesapeake Bay → Atlantic Ocean
- River system: Nanticoke River
- Tributaries
  - left: Prong No. 2
  - right: unnamed tributaries
- Bridges: Flatiron Road, Prospect Church Road

Bright Haines Glade Branch is a 4.13 mi (6.65 km) long third-order tributary to Prospect Branch in Kent County, Delaware. This is the only stream of this name in the United States.

== Course ==
Bright Haines Glade Branch rises on the Browns Branch divide about 0.5 miles southwest of Harrington, Delaware, and then flows southwest to join Prospect Branch about 1-mile southeast of Vernon, Delaware.

== Watershed ==
Bright Haines Glade Branch drains 9.54 square miles (24.7 km^{2}) of area, receives about 45.2 in/year of precipitation, and is about 8.88% forested.

== See also ==
- List of rivers of Delaware
