= Williamsville, Kent County, Delaware =

Unincorporated community in Delaware, United States

Williamsville, Delaware
- Unincorporated community
- Location within Delaware Location within the United States
- Coordinates: 38°53′44″N 75°30′36″W
- Country: United States
- State: Delaware
- County: Kent
- Elevation: 49 ft (15 m)
- Time zone: UTC-5 (Eastern (EST))
  - Summer (DST): UTC-4 (EDT)
- Area code: 302
- GNIS feature ID: 216252

Williamsville is an unincorporated community in Kent County, Delaware, United States. Williamsville is located at the intersection of Williamsville Road and Deep Grass Lane, south of Houston.

It was known as Guinea-Town, until an official name change in 1827.

Williamsville was the site of the Williamsville Colored School (1920–1929).

Griffith's Chapel was listed on the National Register of Historic Places in 1983.
