= Delaware Volunteer Firemen's Association =

The Delaware Volunteer Firemen's Association is an organization established to assist the volunteer fire companies of the state of Delaware.

== History ==
The Delaware Volunteer Fireman's Association can be traced to a meeting in January 1921. Several firemen from throughout the state of Delaware met in Milford to establish a state fireman's association. The Carlisle Fire Company of Milford was authorized to begin the process to form the association. Notices were to be sent to all volunteer fire companies throughout the state, asking them to send two delegates to a meeting at Milford on February 24, 1921, although some newer companies were left out, such as the newly formed Ellendale Vol. Fire Company, the next company south of Milford, which had been formed in April 1920.

The state of Delaware releases an audit each year on the costs and savings of the volunteer fire departments in the state. For the fiscal year ending June 30, 2012 it was estimated that the volunteer fire departments in the state saved the taxpayers more than $289,000,000.

Department	City	Delegate 1	Delegate 2
Dover Fire Department	Dover, Delaware	Alonzo W. Clifton	Sam H. Carson
Georgetown Fire Company	Georgetown, Delaware	Joseph G. Green	Thomas B. Pepper
Harrington Fire Company	Harrington, Delaware	James L. Harmistead	Warren T. Moore
Laurel Fire Department	Laurel, Delaware	M. T. Calloway	W. T. Bennett
Lewes Fire Company	Lewes, Delaware	F. W. Williams	T. R. Duffel
Volunteer Hose Company	Middletown, Delaware	W. R. Gary	Edward S. Jones
Milton Fire Company	Milton, Delaware	Samuel Fithian	R. B. Banning
Citizens Hose Company	Smyrna, Delaware	Harry Collins	John D. Morris
Carlisle Fire Company	Milford, Delaware	James P. Pearce	R. E. Pettyjohn

The first resolution was adopted at the first meeting:

"Resolved, that we, the delegates of the Volunteer Fire Companies in the State of Delaware, in convention assembled in order to form a more perfect organization, establish harmony, insure prosperity and success, obtain and compile statistics concerning the practical working of various apparatus, cultivate fraternal fellowship among the companies and promote the best interest of the Volunteer Firemen of Delaware, do hereby form an organization to be known as the Delaware State Volunteer Firemen's Association."

With the delegates from the nine companies present, the officers were elected and a set of by-laws was adopted.

The first regular convention was held on July 1, 1921, at the Laurel Fire Department, with thirteen companies being represented. The association has continued to hold conventions regularly each year with the exception of 1942–1944, when gatherings were restricted by World War II to executive meetings. Today, all 60 volunteer fire companies in the state are members of the Delaware Volunteer Firemen's Association. The Wilmington Fire Department, Delaware's only paid municipal fire department, is an associate member.

On January 20, 2009, the Delaware Volunteer Firemen's Association marched in the inauguration parade for President Barack Obama as a guest of Vice-President Joseph Biden of Delaware who is an honorary member and President Emeritus of the D.V.F.A. Five members from all 60 departments were invited to march in the parade, led by the marching band of the Citizen's Hose Company of Smyrna.

== Presidents ==
The president of the Delaware Volunteer Firemen's Association is elected to a 1-year term, beginning in September at a presentation at the annual conference. The presidency is on a rotating basis between Delaware's three counties, Sussex, Kent, and New Castle, with the representatives from the other two counties being the first and second vice-president based on when they will become president in the rotation. There was no president in 1942 and 1943 due to World War 2.

Year(s)	Fire Department	Firefighter
1921 - 1923	Carlisle	Charles E. Varney
1924 & 1925	Volunteer Hose	Edward S. Jones
1926	Lewes	G. Clifton Maull
1927	Citizen's Hose	Harry Collins
1928	Delmar	John E. McClaine Jr.
1929	Cranston Heights	Robert Croes
1930	Robbin's Hose	Warren W. Pettyjohn
1931	Laurel	Elbert C. Bailey
1932	Five Points	John N. Jordin
1933	Camden-Wyoming	J. Elmer Haddaway
1934	Lewes	Samuel C. Pierce
1935	Mill Creek	Walter Hubert
1936	Cheswold	Willard D. Boyce
1937	Seaford	Reuben A. Steward
1938	Talleyville	Howard Sheldon
1939	Clayton	Lewis A. Walker
1940	Bridgeville	Leroy B. Truitt
1941	Christiana	John W. Moore
1944	Harrington	Frank C. O'Neal
1945	Lewes	Herald Brittingham
1946 & 1947	Holloway Terrace	Fred Brown
1948	Delmar	E. Bloxem Dougherty
1949	Mill Creek	Layton C. Baynard
1950	Clayton	Fred E. Burke
1951	Rehoboth Beach	Edgar S. Stayer
1952	Talleyville	George W. Duncan
1953	Cheswold	John W. Bamberger
1954	Ellendale	Curtis Ennis
1955	Elsmere	Charles Jones
1956	Camden-Wyoming	Charles Jester
1957	Laurel	Granville T. White

Year(s)	Fire Department	Firefighter
1958	Wilmington Manor	C. Wesley Robinson
1959	Harrington	Paul Neeman
1960	Selbyville	James E. Wilgus
1961	Holloway Terrace	John V. Ryan Jr.
1962	Frederica	Zora B. Tatman
1963	Seaford	William J. Hines
1964	Townsend	Clarence Schwatka
1965	Citizen's Hose	E. Reynolds Bradley
1966	Lewes	William T. Lowe
1967	Cranston Heights	Emmanuel J. Harkins
1968	Felton	Roland Neeman
1969	Greenwood	Arthur L. Jones
1970	Talleyville	Thomas E. Marshall
1971	Cheswold	Elbert C. Golder Sr.
1972	Laurel	David B. Joseph
1973	Odessa	Arthur I. Guessford
1974	Felton	William J. Paskey Jr.
1975	Greenwood	Ralph T. Hynson
1976	Minquas	John E. Cunningham Jr.
1977	Hartly	Morris W. King
1978	Lewes	E. James Monihan Jr.
1979	Christiana	Raymond H. McCall
1980	Citizen's Hose	Richard E. Ennis
1981	Frankford	John Bare
1982	Elsmere	William G. Walton Sr.
1982 - 1983	Clayton	William R. Carrow
1983 - 1984	Rehoboth Beach	Richard C. Mitchell
1984 - 1985	Mill Creek	Lawrence E. Mergenthaler
1985 - 1986	South Bowers	Thomas V. Baker Sr.
1986 - 1987	Laurel	Clifford F. Lee

Year(s)	Fire Department	Firefighter
1987 - 1988	Aetna Hose, Hook, & Ladder	Robert Sweetman
1988 - 1989	Hartly	Frank King
1989 - 1990	Frankford	Walton A. Johnson Jr.
1990 - 1991	Holloway Terrace	Ed Barlow
1991 - 1992	Magnolia	George A. Diamond
1992 - 1993	Laurel	Elmer Steele
1993 - 1994	Talleyville	Harry Warner
1994 - 1995	Hartly	J. Allen Metheny Sr.
1995 - 1996	Milton	Lynn Rogers
1996 - 1997	Minquadale	Joseph Hojnicki Sr.
1997 - 1998	Magnolia	Donald Knight
1998 - 1999	Seaford	Mike Vincent
1999 - 2000	Aetna Hose, Hook, & Ladder	Steven Austin
2000 - 2001	Clayton	James L. Cubbage Jr.
2001 - 2002	Milton	Dale Callaway
2002 - 2003	Delaware City	Jasper H. Lakey
2003 - 2004	Carlisle	Marvin Sharp
2004 - 2005	Selbyville	Ray Stevens
2005 - 2006	Odessa	Ken Pyle
2006 - 2007	Citizen's Hose	Alan Robinson
2007 - 2008	Seaford	Ron Marvel
2008 - 2009	Elsmere	Warren Jones
2009 - 2010	Clayton	Kevin Wilson
2010 - 2011	Memorial	William Tobin
2011 - 2012	Brandywine Hundred	Charles W. Frampton, Jr.
2012 - 2013	Dover	Charles Boyer
2013 - 2014	Seaford	Richard Toulson
2014 - 2015	Hockessin	Anthony Guzzo
2015 - 2016	Farmington	Joseph Zeroles
2016 - 2017	Ellendale	Ted Walius

== Fireman of the Year Award ==
Year	Fire Department	Firefighter
1968	Wilmington Manor	George I. Cochran Jr.
1971	Five Points	Donald J. Zulinksi
1971	Five Points	John J. Jones
1974	Cheswold	James R. Roy Sr.
1976	Hartly	Newlin E. Wood Sr.
1977	Harrington	Paul Neeman
1978	Frederica	Zora A. Tatman
1981	Talleyville	Thomas E. Marshall
1981	Citizens Hose	Bruce C. Ennis
1982	Frankford	LeRoy V. Ryan Sr.
1983	Holloway Terrace	John V. Ryan Jr.
1984	Rehoboth Beach	Thomas S. Calhoun
1985	Citizens Hose	Richard E. Ennis
1986	Hartly	Morris W. King
1987	Gumboro	Milton J. Niblett
1988	Millville	William J. Quillen
1989	Mill Creek	Lawrence E. Mergenthaler
1990	Millsboro	J. Ralph Brittingham
1991	Lewes	G. Edward Wyatt
1992	Clayton	William R. Carrow

Year	Fire Department	Firefighter
1993	Townsend	Clarence Schwatka
1994	Minquadale	Joseph Hojnicki Sr.
1995	Delaware City	Charles Neel
1995	Frankford	Walton A. Johnson Sr.
1996	Ellendale	Elmer Ennis
1997	Clayton	Kevin L. Wilson
1997	Marydel	Albert V. Lane Jr.
1998	Hartly	J. Allen Metheny Sr.
1999	Dover	Carleton E. Carey Sr.
2000	Felton	Roland Neeman
2001	Houston	Carroll B. Jester
2002	Seaford	Norman L. Tate
2003	Aetna Hose, Hook, & Ladder	Charles Wollaston
2003	Christiana	Raymond H. McCall
2004	Felton	William J. Paskey Jr.
2005	Millsboro	Norman L. Betts
2006	Clayton	J. Wallace Hudson
2007	Bethany Beach	Hal Barber
