= Oil City, Maryland =

Coordinates: 38°54′18″N 75°48′54″W

Entrance to Oil City, Maryland

Oil City is an unincorporated community in Caroline County, Maryland, United States.

It is located at the junction of Maryland Route 313 and Maryland Route 317, near the town Denton, Maryland, about five miles from the Delaware state border. When the area was named, there were gas stations on all four corners of the intersection.

In the 1920s, the nearby waterfront along the Choptank River had three large oil yards that were distribution points for Standard Oil of New Jersey (now ExxonMobil), American Oil Company (now Amoco), and Sun Oil (now Sunoco). Storage facilities used barges to supply oil tanks well into the 1940s. These facilities meant the area played an important role in getting gasoline, kerosene, lubricants, and other petroleum products into the region.
