= Griffith's Chapel =

Historic church in Delaware, United States

- U.S. National Register of Historic Places
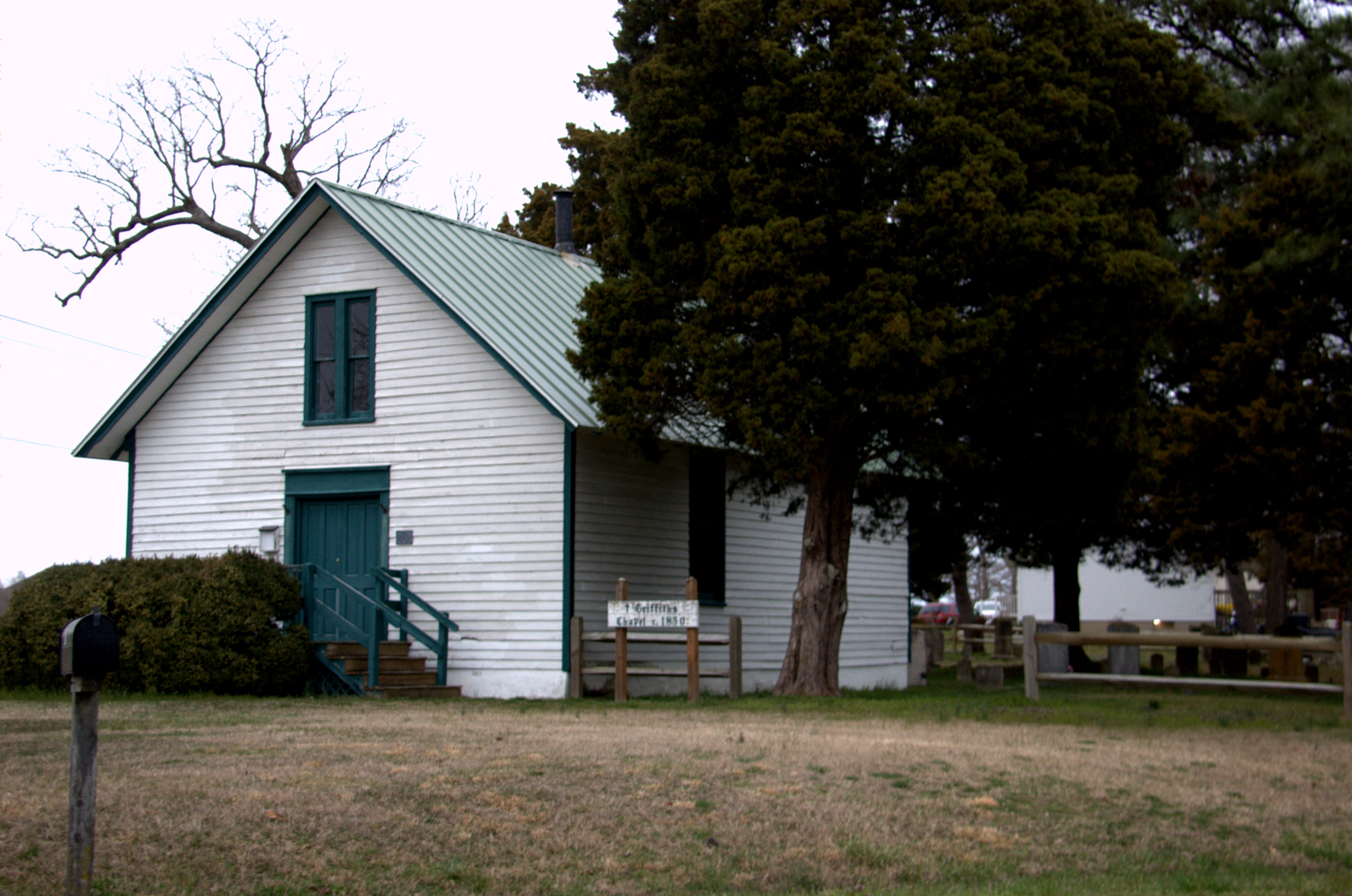

- Location within Delaware Location within the United States
- Location: Intersection of Williamsville Road and Abbotts Pond Road, Williamsville, Delaware
- Coordinates: 38°53′45″N 75°30′30″W
- Area: less than one acre
- Built: 1850
- NRHP reference No.: 83001370
- Added to NRHP: October 29, 1983

Griffith's Chapel, also known as Williamsville Methodist Church, is a historic Methodist chapel located at the junction of Williamsville Road and Abbotts Pond Road in Williamsville, Kent County, Delaware. It was built in 1850, and is a one-story, rectangular frame building measuring 24 feet wide by 30 feet deep. It has a gable roof and is sheathed in clapboard. The property also includes a 19th-century graveyard in which early members of the congregation are buried.

It was added to the National Register of Historic Places in 1983.
