= Argos Corner, Delaware =

Unincorporated community in Delaware, United States

Argos Corner, Delaware Argo Corners
- Unincorporated community
- Location within Delaware Location within the United States
- Coordinates: 38°52′17″N 75°20′44″W
- Country: United States
- State: Delaware
- County: Sussex
- Elevation: 30 ft (9.1 m)
- Time zone: UTC-5 (Eastern (EST))
  - Summer (DST): UTC-4 (EDT)
- Postal code: 19963
- Area code: 302
- GNIS feature ID: 213571

Argos Corner (also referred to as Argo Corners) is an unincorporated community in Sussex County, Delaware, United States.

Argos Corner is located along Delaware Route 1 (DE 1) southeast of Milford. It is a neighborhood consisting of one main road (Argos Corner Road), which used to be old DE 14. Argos Corner Road is perpendicular to Slaughter Beach Road.

Former Delaware Governor Ruth Ann Minner once lived in Argos Corner.

== History ==
Argo's population was 31 in 1900.
