= North Shores, Delaware =

Unincorporated community in Delaware, United States

- Unincorporated community
- Location within Delaware Location within the United States
- Coordinates: 38°44′10″N 75°05′04″W
- Country: United States
- State: Delaware
- County: Sussex
- Elevation: 3 ft (0.91 m)
- Time zone: UTC-5 (Eastern (EST))
  - Summer (DST): UTC-4 (EDT)
- ZIP code: 19971
- Area code: 302
- GNIS feature ID: 217010

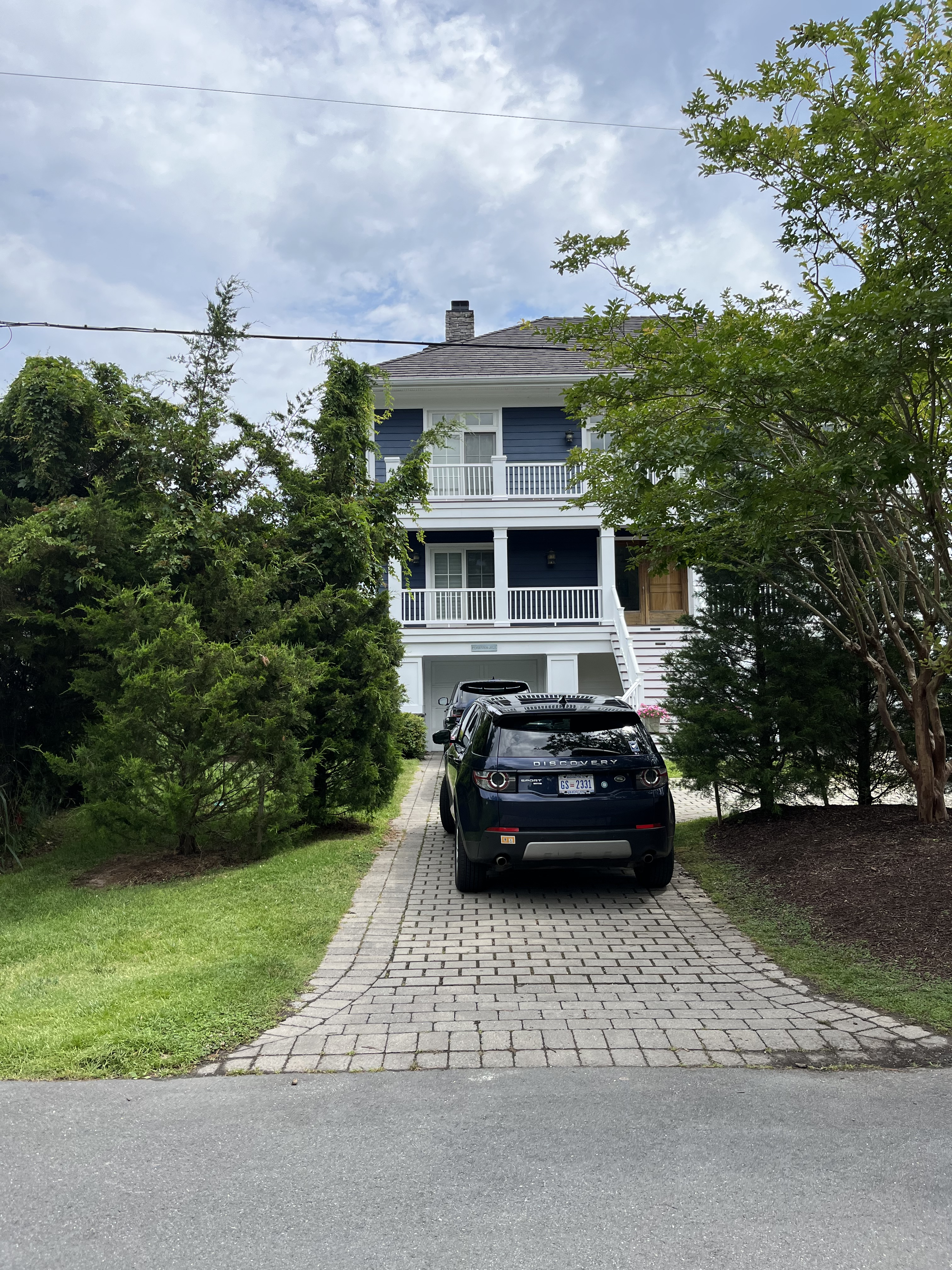
The beach house of U.S. President Joe Biden and First Lady Jill Biden in North Shores, which served as their Summer White House.

North Shores is an unincorporated community in Sussex County, Delaware, United States. North Shores is located along the Atlantic Ocean north of Henlopen Acres and Rehoboth Beach and south of Cape Henlopen State Park.

North Shores is a residential community that consists of 192 single-family homes, 48 apartments, and 55 townhomes, along with 10 homes and 11 condominiums added to the original community. In addition to residences, North Shores is home to a Bath & Tennis Club that consists of a swimming pool, two tennis courts, a marina for 25 boats, and 2,200 feet (670 m) of private beach along the Atlantic Ocean. North Shores was established in 1956 by Daniel G. Anderson and J. Rodney King, who purchased the land to build the community.

A private security service, which is owned by the town of Henlopen Acres, began in North Shores in 1996. North Shores shares the services and expense of this security service with Henlopen Acres. The security service, which patrols all of Henlopen Acres and North Shores, operates two vehicles.

North Shores is a popular beach resort for lesbians and gay men. North Shores is more popular with the lesbian community and is known as a primarily lesbian beach, whereas Poodle Beach is more popular with gay men.

== Notable people ==
- Joe Biden, 46th President of the United States (2021–2025), 47th Vice President of the United States (2009–2017), United States Senator from Delaware (1973–2009), and Jill Biden, educator and First Lady of the United States (2021–2025), Second Lady of the United States (2009–2017) own a beach house in the North Shores neighborhood, just north of the Henlopen Acres town limits.
- John Delaney, United States Representative for Maryland's 6th congressional district (2013–2019) and candidate for President of the United States in 2020, owns a beach house in North Shores.

| Preceded by Cape Henlopen State Park | Beaches of Delmarva | Succeeded by Henlopen Acres |
