= Houston, Delaware =

- Town
- Location of Houston in Kent County, Delaware.

- Location within the state of Delaware Houston (the United States)
- Coordinates: 38°55′03″N 75°30′19″W
- Country: United States
- State: Delaware
- County: Kent
- Incorporated as a town: 1913

Area
  - Total: 0.38 sq mi (0.99 km^{2})
  - Land: 0.38 sq mi (0.99 km^{2})
  - Water: 0 sq mi (0.00 km^{2})
- Elevation: 52 ft (16 m)

Population (2020)
  - Total: 381
  - Density: 994.2/sq mi (383.87/km^{2})
- Time zone: UTC−5 (Eastern (EST))
  - Summer (DST): UTC−4 (EDT)
- ZIP code: 19954
- Area code: 302
- FIPS code: 10-36760
- GNIS feature ID: 214127
- Website: houston.delaware.gov

Houston (/ˈhaʊstən/ HOW-stən) is a town in Kent County, Delaware, United States. It is part of the Dover metropolitan area. The population was 381 in 2020. It was named for John W. Houston. The town was named after John W. Houston who was Delaware's Secretary of State from 1841 to 1844.

== History ==
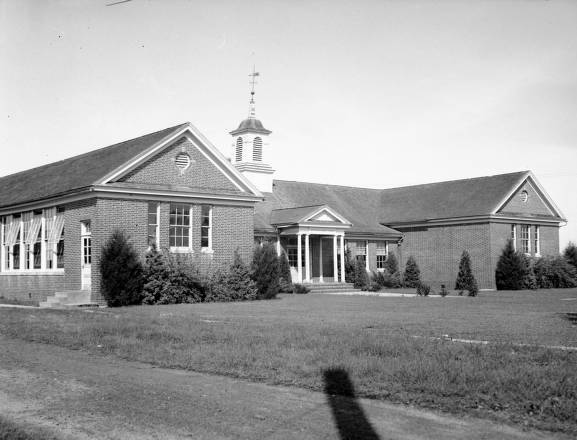
A photo dating 1936 of Houston School, Houston, done by the Delaware Board of Education

The Town was first incorporated in 1913, right before a local election was to be held. A total of five Commissioners were elected for a total of a two-year term. Other positions within the town were also voted on, including a clerk, treasurer, tax collector, alderman, and town constable. From then on, these elected figures would meet four times every year, to pass ordinances and rules to govern the town, including tax regulations.

The town's "incorporated" status was amanded various times throughout the years.

== Geography ==
According to the United States Census Bureau, the town has a total area of 0.4 square miles (1.0 km^{2}), all land.

== Demographics ==
Historical population
Census	Pop.	Note	%±
1930	254		—
1940	296		16.5%
1950	332		12.2%
1960	421		26.8%
1970	317		−24.7%
1980	357		12.6%
1990	487		36.4%
2000	430		−11.7%
2010	374		−13.0%
2020	381		1.9%
U.S. Decennial Census

At the 2000 census there were 430 people, 151 households, and 115 families living in the town. The population density was 1,144.4 inhabitants per square mile (441.9/km^{2}). There were 166 housing units at an average density of 441.8 units per square mile (170.6 units/km^{2}). The racial makeup of the town was 89.30% White, 8.37% African American, 0.70% Native American, 0.47% from other races, and 1.16% from two or more races. Hispanic or Latino of any race were 4.65%.

Of the 151 households 39.7% had children under the age of 18 living with them, 64.2% were married couples living together, 8.6% had a female householder with no husband present, and 23.2% were non-families. 22.5% of households were one person and 10.6% were one person aged 65 or older. The average household size was 2.85 and the average family size was 3.24.

The age distribution was 30.5% under the age of 18, 7.2% from 18 to 24, 32.6% from 25 to 44, 17.2% from 45 to 64, and 12.6% 65 or older. The median age was 33 years. For every 100 females, there were 103.8 males. For every 100 females age 18 and over, there were 94.2 males.

The median household income was $39,545 and the median family income was $46,563. Males had a median income of $29,643 versus $20,208 for females. The per capita income for the town was $15,919. About 1.7% of families and 5.8% of the population were below the poverty line, including 4.0% of those under age 18 and 14.3% of those age 65 or over.

== Education ==
Houston is in the Milford School District.

== Infrastructure ==
=== Transportation ===
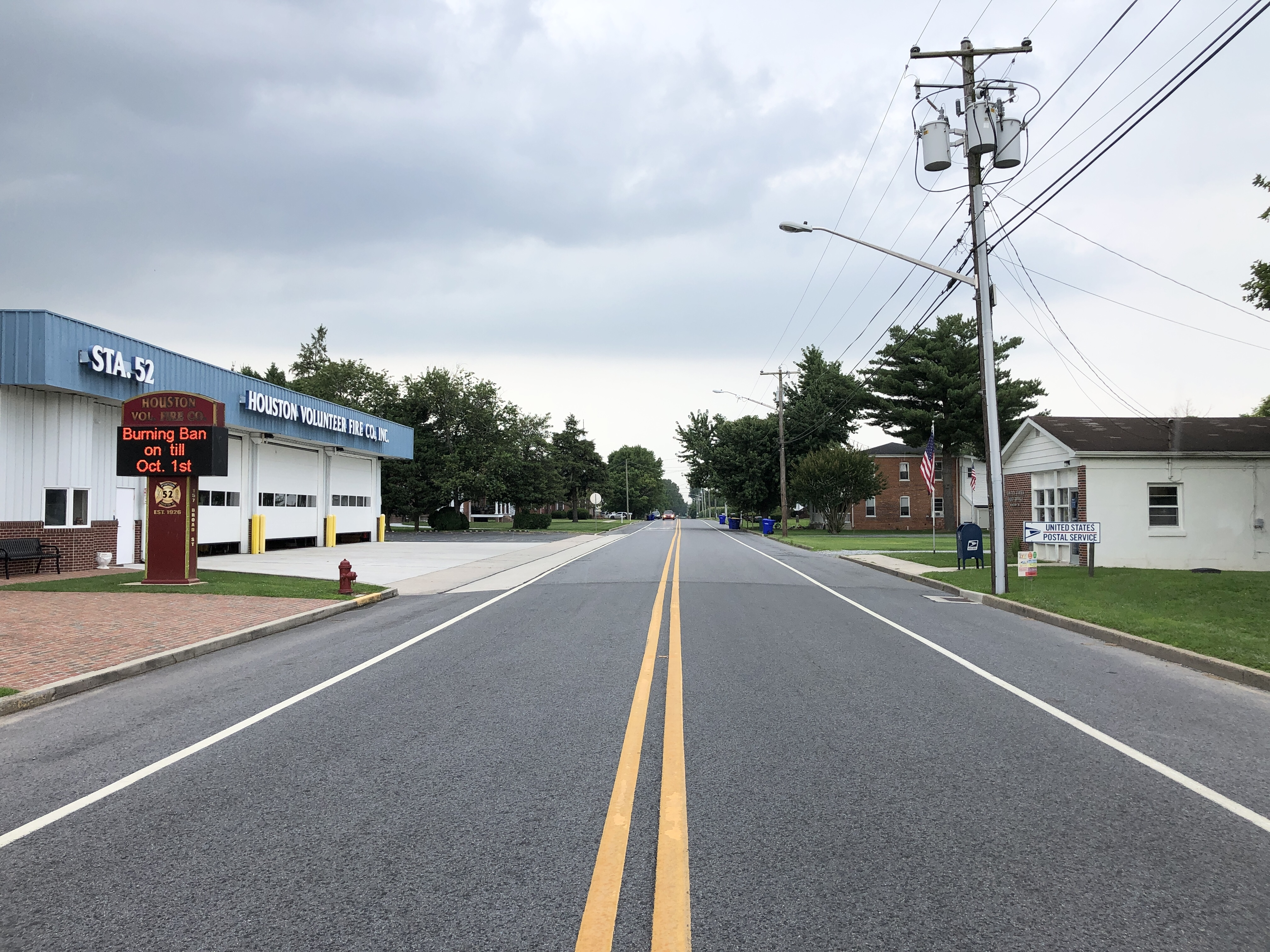
Broad Street northbound in Houston

Front Street and School Street are the main east–west streets in Houston. Broad Street runs north–south through the center of Houston and leads north to an intersection with Delaware Route 14. DE 14 heads west toward Harrington and east toward Milford. Deep Grass Lane passes to the west of the Houston and heads south toward Williamsville and north as Killens Pond Road toward Felton. The Delmarva Central Railroad's Indian River Subdivision line passes east–west through Houston.

=== Utilities ===
Delmarva Power, a subsidiary of Exelon, provides electricity to Houston. Chesapeake Utilities provides natural gas to the town.
