= Special routes of U.S. Route 9 =

Special routes of U.S. Route 9

Highway system
- United States Numbered Highway System; List; Special; Divided

A total of at least three special routes of U.S. Route 9 (US 9) exist and at least seven have been decommissioned.

== Georgetown truck route ==
U.S. Route 9 Truck
- Location: Georgetown, Delaware
- Length: 6.1 mi (9.8 km)
- Existed: 1983–present

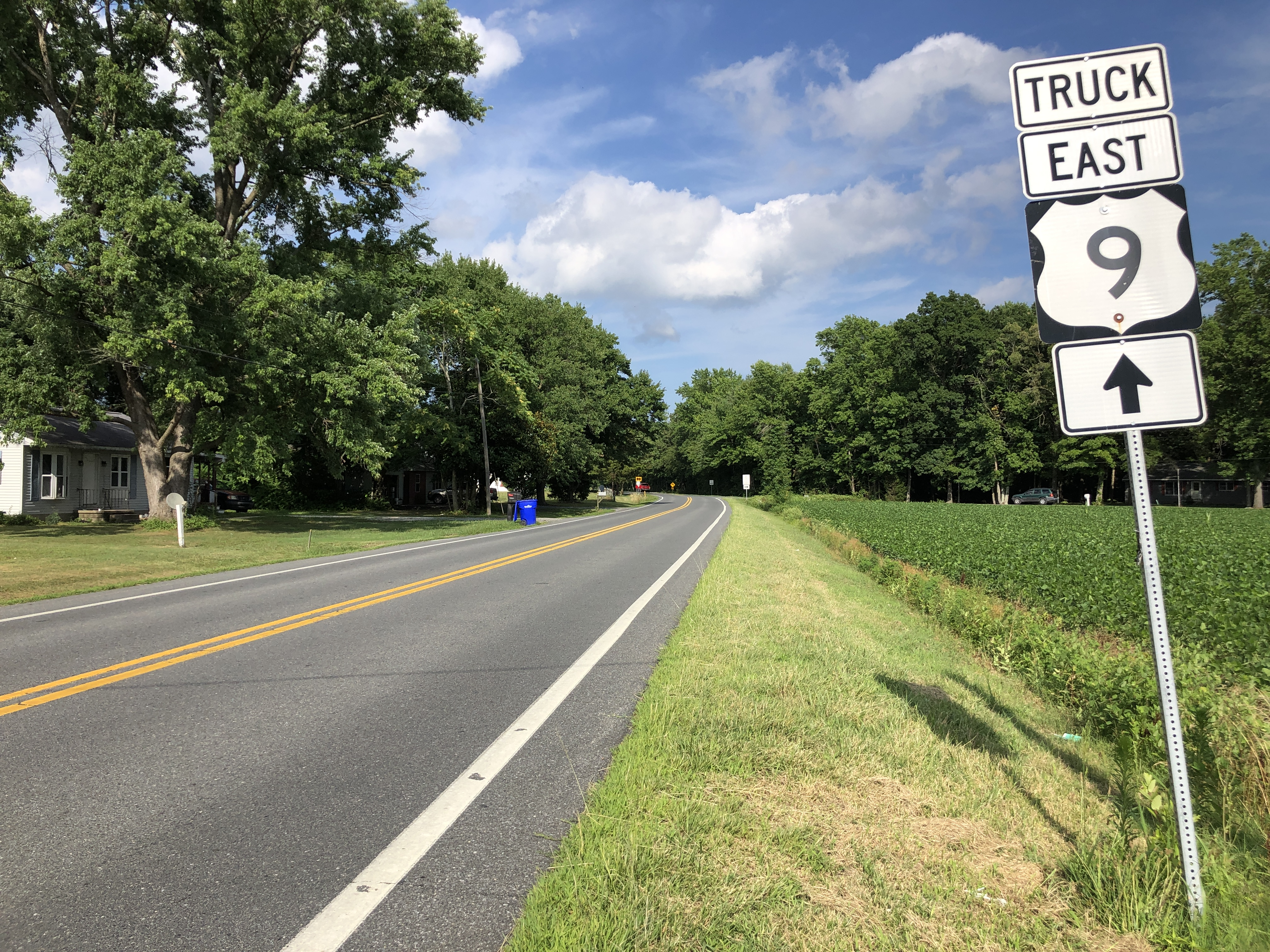
US 9 Truck eastbound along Park Avenue in Georgetown

U.S. Route 9 Truck (US 9 Truck) is a 6.1-mile (9.8 km) truck route of US 9 in the town of Georgetown in Sussex County, Delaware. US 9 Truck begins at an intersection between US 9 and US 113/Delaware Route 404 Truck (DE 404 Truck) to the west of Georgetown. At this point, US 9 Truck heads southeast concurrent with US 113 and DE 404 Truck on four-lane divided Dupont Boulevard. The road heads through woodland with some farmfields and businesses. US 9 Truck/DE 404 Truck split from US 113 by heading east-northeast on two-lane undivided Arrow Safety Road. The road passes through a mix of farmland and woodland with some development, coming to a roundabout with South Bedford Street, where the name changes to Park Avenue. The routes continue east before curving to the northeast, crossing the Delmarva Central Railroad's Indian River Subdivision line at-grade. The road turns east and passes to the south of Delaware Coastal Airport, where it makes a curve to the north. US 9 Truck/DE 404 Truck head through a mix of farmland and woodland with some homes to the east of the airport, crossing the Delmarva Central Railroad's Lewes Industrial Track line at-grade before ending at US 9/DE 404 east of Georgetown. The portion of US 9 Truck concurrent with US 113 is part of the National Highway System.

US 9 Truck was designated in 1983, heading south along US 113 before it turned north on South Bedford Street and east on Park Avenue, where it picked up its current alignment. The Delaware Department of Transportation (DelDOT) moved US 9 Truck to a new alignment of Park Avenue located further to the south. The realigned Park Avenue leads to a roundabout with South Bedford Street and Arrow Safety Road, from which US 9 Truck follows Arrow Safety Road west to US 113. Road construction on the new alignment of Park Avenue and improvements to Arrow Safety Road began in 2022. The new alignment of US 9 Truck opened on May 28, 2024. A ribbon-cutting ceremony was held on June 7, 2024, with DelDOT secretary Nicole Majeski and state and local officials in attendance.

Major intersections

The entire route is in Georgetown, Sussex County.

mi	km	Destinations	Notes
0.00	0.00	US 113 north (DE 404 Truck west / Dupont Boulevard); US 9 (County Seat Highway/West Market Street) – Laurel, Seaford, Georgetown, Lewes	Western terminus; west end of US 113/DE 404 Truck overlap
1.55	2.49	US 113 south (Dupont Boulevard)	East end of US 113 overlap
6.1	9.8	US 9 / DE 404 (Lewes Georgetown Highway)	Eastern terminus; eastern terminus of DE 404 Truck
1.000 mi = 1.609 km; 1.000 km = 0.621 mi: Concurrency terminus

== Lewes business route ==
U.S. Route 9 Business
- Location: Five Points–Lewes, Delaware
- Length: 3.36 mi (5.41 km)
- Existed: 1976–present
- Tourist routes: Historic Lewes Byway, Gateway to the Bayshore

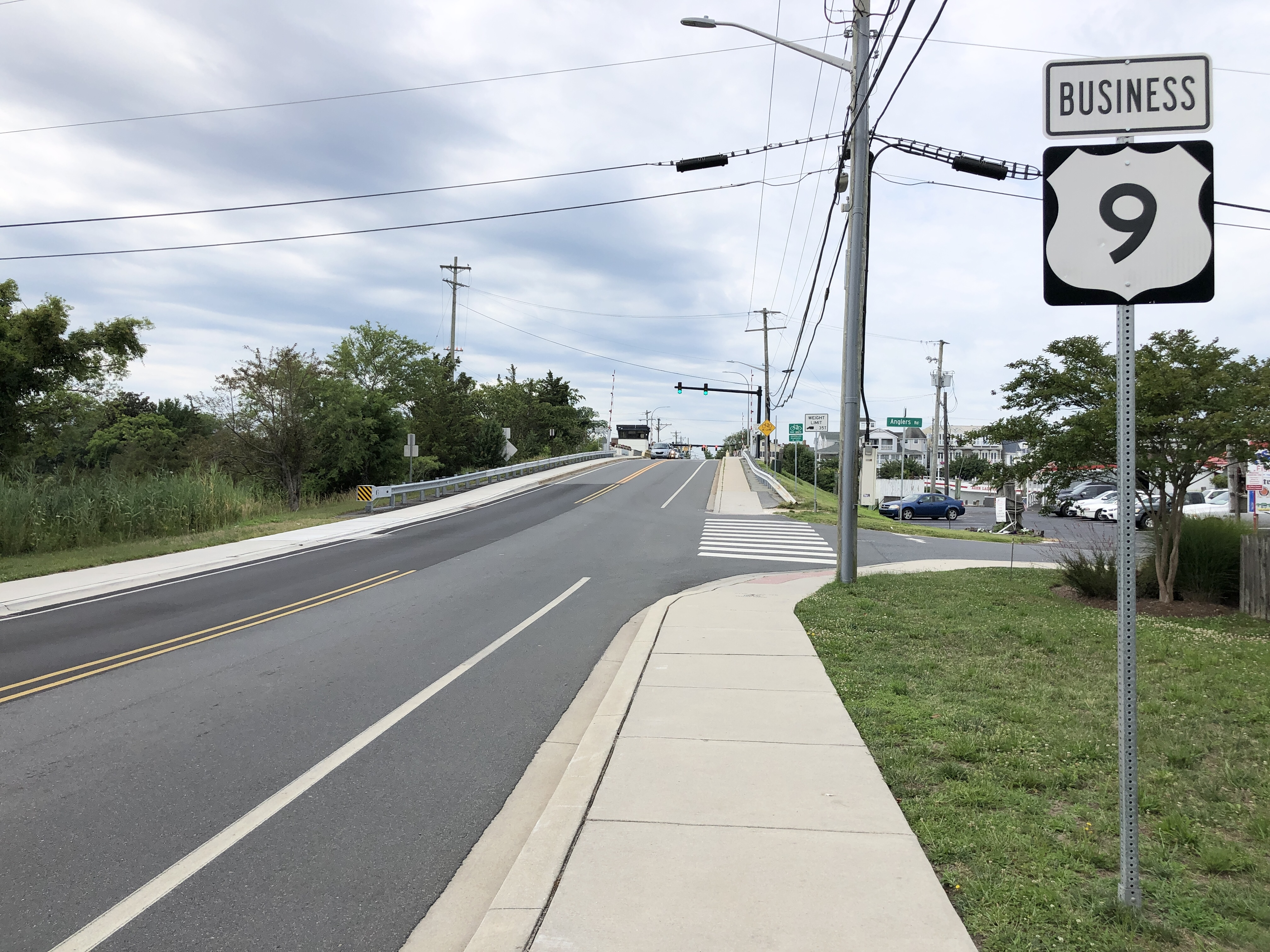
US 9 Bus. westbound approaching the Lewes and Rehoboth Canal in Lewes

U.S. Route 9 Business (US 9 Bus.) is a 3.36-mile (5.41 km) business route off US 9 in the city of Lewes in Sussex County, Delaware. US 9 Bus. begins at the Five Points intersection in the community of Nassau, where it intersects US 9, DE 1, and the eastern terminus of DE 404. This intersection has no access to eastbound US 9/southbound DE 1 from US 9 Bus. as left turns are prohibited. From here, the route heads northeast on four-lane divided Savannah Road, soon narrowing to a two-lane undivided road. The business route runs through commercial areas to the southeast of a residential development, gaining a center left-turn lane. The road comes to an intersection with Wescoats Corner Road in the community of Wescoats Corner, which heads southeast to provide access to southbound DE 1. US 9 Bus. loses the turn lane as it continues through the residential community of Quakertown. The road continues past homes and some businesses as it enters Lewes, where it crosses the Georgetown–Lewes Trail. The route passes to the southeast of Beebe Medical Center before it crosses into the historic downtown area of Lewes, where it passes by the Zwaanendael Museum. US 9 Bus. crosses the Lewes and Rehoboth Canal on a drawbridge and runs past businesses to the northwest and marshland to the southeast. The business route passes a mix of homes and businesses before it turns east onto Cape Henlopen Drive near Lewes Beach along the Delaware Bay. US 9 Bus. runs between the bay to the north and homes to the south before it comes to its terminus at an intersection with US 9. Past here, Cape Henlopen Drive continues east as part of US 9 toward the Cape May–Lewes Ferry terminal. The entire length of US 9 Bus. is designated as part of the Historic Lewes Byway, Gateway to the Bayshore, a Delaware Byway. US 9 Bus. has an annual average daily traffic count ranging from a high of 18,511 vehicles at the Donovans Road intersection to a low of 4,782 vehicles at the eastern terminus at US 9. The route was designated on a former part of DE 18 by 1976, with US 9 routed to bypass Lewes on DE 1, Kings Highway, and the Theodore C. Freeman Highway to the south.

Major intersections

The entire route is in Sussex County.

Location	mi	km	Destinations	Notes
Nassau	0.00	0.00	US 9 east / DE 1 (Coastal Highway) US 9 west / DE 404 west (Lewes Georgetown Highway)	No access from westbound US 9 Bus. to eastbound US 9/southbound DE 1; western terminus; northern terminus of DE 23; eastern terminus of DE 404
Wescoats Corner			Wescoats Corner Road to DE 1 south – Rehoboth Beach, Dewey Beach	
Lewes	3.36	5.41	US 9 (Theodore C. Freeman Highway/Cape Henlopen Drive) – Cape May–Lewes Ferry	Eastern terminus
1.000 mi = 1.609 km; 1.000 km = 0.621 mi: Incomplete access

== Beesley's Point temporary route ==
Temporary U.S. Route 9
- Location: Upper Township–Somers Point, New Jersey
- Length: 3.89 mi (6.26 km)
- Existed: 2013

U.S. Route 9 Temporary (US 9 Temp.) was the designation for the detour around the closed Beesley's Point Bridge carrying US 9 over the Great Egg Harbor Bay between Upper Township, Cape May County and Somers Point, Atlantic County. The route headed east from US 9 in Upper Township on County Route 623 (CR 623) before heading north on the Garden State Parkway and crossing the Great Egg Harbor Bay on the Great Egg Harbor Bridge, ending at an interchange with US 9 in Somers Point. The route was 3.89 miles (6.26 km) long. The designation was replaced by US 9 following the demolition of the bridge in 2013, making it so that US 9 could be driven from its entirety once again.

== Toms River alternate route ==
U.S. Route 9 Alternate
- Location: South Toms River–Pleasant Plains, New Jersey
- Length: 3.73 mi (6.00 km)
- Existed: 1954–1975

U.S. Route 9 Alternate (US 9 Alt.) was a 3.73-mile-long (6.00 km) alternate route of US 9 that ran through Toms River, New Jersey. It was created in 1954 after US 9 was rerouted to use the Garden State Parkway through the Toms River area but was later renumbered to Route 166.

== Newark–Jersey City temporary route ==
Temporary U.S. Route 9
- Location: Newark–Jersey City, New Jersey

== Jersey City truck route ==
U.S. Route 1/9 Truck
- Location: Newark–Jersey City, New Jersey
- Length: 4.11 mi (6.61 km)
- Existed: 1953–present

U.S. Route 1/9 Truck (US 1/9 Truck) is a 4.11-mile (6.61 km) truck route of US 1/9 in northern New Jersey between Newark and Jersey City that bypasses the Pulaski Skyway, which trucks are banned from. The route heads east across the Passaic River into Kearny before crossing the Hackensack River into Jersey City, where the truck route turns north at the Route 440 intersection. It intersects Route 7 before turning east and ending at the Tonnele Circle with US 1/9 and Route 139. Prior to 1953, US 1/9 Truck was designated as Route 25T, designating a truck bypass of Route 25, which formerly followed US 1/9 on the Pulaski Skyway.

== Jersey City business route ==
U.S. Route 1/9 Business
- Location: Jersey City, New Jersey–New York City, New York
- Length: 2.77 mi (4.46 km)
- Existed: 1953–by the 1990s

U.S. Route 1/9 Business (US 1/9 Bus.) was a 2.77-mile-long (4.46 km) former business route of US 1/9 in Jersey City that ran between US 1/9 at the Tonnele Circle and the Holland Tunnel across the Hudson River to New York City. The route was created in 1953, replacing what had been a part of Route 25. The business route was renumbered to Route 139 by the 1990s.

== Jersey City–Inwood Hill Park alternate route ==
U.S. Route 9 Alternate
- Location: Jersey City, New Jersey–Inwood Hill Park, New York

== Newburgh alternate route ==
U.S. Route 9W Alternate
- Location: Newburgh, New York

== Rouses Point alternate route ==
U.S. Route 9 Alternate
- Location: Rouses Point, New York

== See also ==
- List of special routes of the United States Numbered Highway System
