= Quakertown, Denton, Texas =

Area of Denton, Texas

Quakertown was a freedmen's town located in Denton, Texas.

== History ==
In 1875, a group of 27 formerly enslaved families from the White Rock area of Dallas arrived in Denton. They purchased land south of the Denton town square, within the Denton city limits, to create a new settlement they called Freedman Town.

In 1878, Denton’s first school for Black children opened, the Fred Douglass School. The school attracted many Black families to the area, spurring the growth of Freedman Town. Due to the growth, the community relocated along Pecan Creek. This new community was called Quakertown, after the Quakers of the northeast who supported the abolition of slavery and aided freed people during Reconstruction.

By the 1880s, Quakertown had several established businesses, including a grocery store, mortuary, barbershop, doctor’s office, and cafe, as well as churches and a number of fraternal lodges. However, most Quakertown residents earned their living outside of Quakertown. Some worked for white families as cooks, gardeners, and domestic servants. Others worked for universities in Denton.

By 1900, over 500 Black people lived within the city of Denton, most of whom likely lived in Quakertown.

The Fred Douglass School burned down in 1913. It was rebuilt in 1916, a mile away from its original location.

== Displacement by City Park ==
In 1903, the College of Industrial Arts, now Texas Woman’s University, opened. The campus was a block north of Quakertown’s northern border. College president F.M. Bralley pursued accreditation for the school, but believed that the college’s proximity to Quakertown was preventing them from receiving that designation.

In 1920, Bralley began advocating for the removal of Quakertown. In a speech to the Denton Rotary, he claimed that Denton “could rid the college of the menace of the negro quarters in close proximity to the college and thereby remove the danger that is always present so long as the situation remains as it is, and that could be done in a business way and without friction.”

For years, calls for a city park had been made by local social clubs and within the Denton Record-Chronicle. In December 1920, the Chamber of Commerce announced their intent create of a city park at the site of Quakertown, which would be made possible by a $75,000 (~$886,993 in 2024) bond election.

The April 5, 1921 bond election passed, meaning Quakertown residents would be displaced. In July 1922, 21 acres in the southeast part of Denton, called Solomon Hill, was selected as the relocation site. Some Quakertown residents left the area entirely. Those that relocated were faced with harassment and had to rebuild their community anew.

== Legacy ==
The history of Quakertown came to prominence in the 1980s thanks to local historians. Since, there have been a number of efforts to commemorate the history of the area. The name of the park built on what had been Quakertown was changed from Civic Center Park to Quakertown Park in 2006. In 2008, one of the remaining Quakertown homes was moved and restored to become the Denton County African American Museum.
