= Wescoats Corner, Delaware =

Unincorporated community in Delaware, United States

- Unincorporated community
- Location within Delaware Location within the United States
- Coordinates: 38°45′06″N 75°09′52″W
- Country: United States
- State: Delaware
- County: Sussex
- Elevation: 26 ft (7.9 m)
- Time zone: UTC-5 (Eastern (EST))
  - Summer (DST): UTC-4 (EDT)
- Area code: 302
- GNIS feature ID: 214819

Wescoats Corner is an unincorporated community in Sussex County, Delaware, United States. Wescoats Corner is located at the intersection of U.S. Route 9 Business and Wescoats Corner Road, southwest of Lewes.
