= Quakertown, Delaware =

Unincorporated community in Delaware, United States

Quakertown, Delaware Prettymanville
- Unincorporated community
- Location within Delaware Location within the United States
- Coordinates: 38°45′19″N 75°09′34″W
- Country: United States
- State: Delaware
- County: Sussex
- Elevation: 23 ft (7.0 m)
- Time zone: UTC-5 (Eastern (EST))
  - Summer (DST): UTC-4 (EDT)
- Area code: 302
- GNIS feature ID: 214506

Quakertown (also known as Prettymanville) is an unincorporated community in Sussex County, Delaware, United States. Quakertown is located on U.S. Route 9 Business, southwest of Lewes.
