= Vernon, Delaware =

Unincorporated community in Delaware, United States

- Unincorporated community
- Location within Delaware Location within the United States
- Coordinates: 38°53′36″N 75°39′10″W
- Country: United States
- State: Delaware
- County: Kent
- Elevation: 49 ft (15 m)
- Time zone: UTC-5 (Eastern (EST))
  - Summer (DST): UTC-4 (EDT)
- Area code: 302
- GNIS feature ID: 216238

Vernon is an unincorporated community in Kent County, Delaware, United States. Vernon is located along Delaware Route 14, west of Harrington.
