= Adamsville, Delaware =

Unincorporated community in Delaware, United States

- Unincorporated community
- Location within Delaware Location within the United States
- Coordinates: 38°49′53″N 75°41′21″W
- Country: United States
- State: Delaware
- Counties: Kent, Sussex
- Elevation: 36 ft (11 m)
- Time zone: UTC-5 (Eastern (EST))
  - Summer (DST): UTC-4 (EDT)
- Area code: 302
- GNIS feature ID: 216015

Adamsville is an unincorporated community in Kent and Sussex counties of Delaware, United States. Adamsville is located at the intersection of Delaware Route 16 and Adamsville Road, northwest of Greenwood.

== History ==
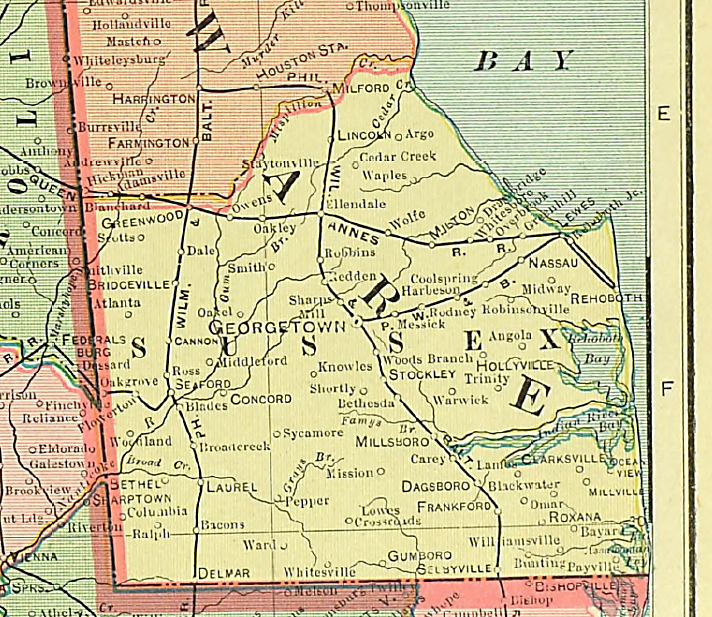
Adamsville in northwestern Sussex County, Delaware, as shown in a 1902 atlas

Adamsville's population was 20 in 1890, and was 28 in 1900.
