= Burrsville, Maryland =

Unincorporated community in Maryland, United States

- Populated place
- Location within Maryland Location within the United States
- Coordinates: 38°53′38″N 75°43′44″W
- Country: United States
- State: Maryland
- County: Caroline
- Elevation: 56 ft (17 m)
- GNIS feature ID: 583498

Burrsville is a populated place in Caroline County, Maryland, United States. One of the first references is on the 1875 map of Caroline County, where the Burrsville Post Office appears. Burrsville is located near the Delaware border.

The Chinquapin School, established by legislative provision circa 1840, was one of the earliest public schools serving the area and remained Burrsville’s school until the 1870s.

The Methodist Protestant Church was an early fixture, built circa 1833. After the passage of the 15th Constitutional Amendment, in 1884 the structure was used as a colored school.

The Burrsville General Store was a focal point for local commerce, opening in 1861 and operating for more than a century until its closure in the early 2000s. On Oct. 18, 1998, it was the site of an armed robbery in which the store owner and her sister were shot and killed.

According to a Caroline County history, the most notable figures associated with Burrsville are the Saulsbury brothers, who were born across the state line in Mispillion Hundred, Del., and attended the Chinquapin School, which had been built on Saulsbury family land. They later gained distinction in Delaware politics: Gove Saulsbury as Delaware governor, Willard Saulsbury as Delaware Attorney General, and Eli Saulsbury as U.S. Senator.
