= Tanyard =

Tanyard may refer to:

- The yard of a tannery, see Tanning (leather)
- Tanyard, Maryland, an unincorporated community
- Tanyard Branch (disambiguation)
- Tanyard Creek (disambiguation)
