= USS LST-906 =

1944 LST-542-class tank landing ship

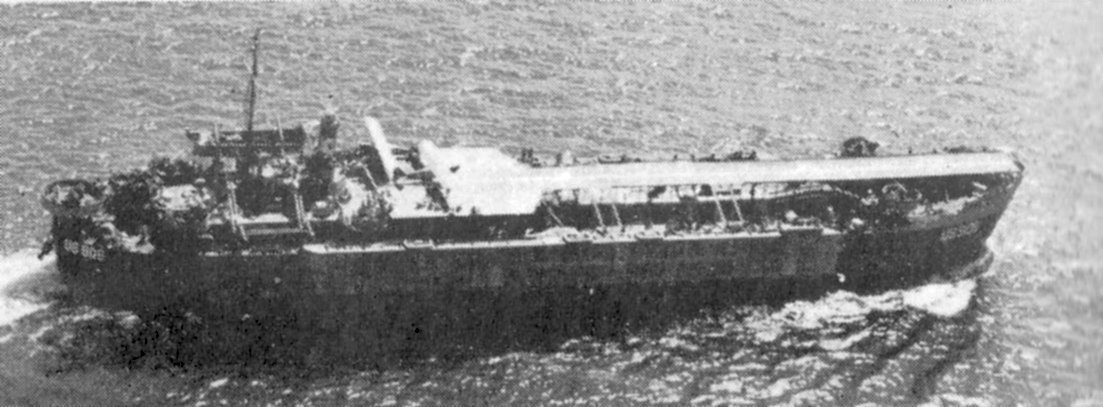
- Undated photo of LST-906 underway in the Mediterranean. She is fitted with a 220 ft × 16 ft (67.1 m × 4.9 m) temporary flight deck for launching USAAF Piper L-4 Grasshopper observation aircraft, one of which is shown, ready for launching.

History

United States
- Name: LST-906
- Builder: Bethlehem-Hingham Shipyard, Hingham, Massachusetts
- Yard number: 3376
- Laid down: 24 January 1944
- Launched: 11 March 1944
- Sponsored by: Mrs. Henry Levine
- Commissioned: 27 April 1944
- Decommissioned: 20 May 1945
- Stricken: 22 June 1945
- Identification: Hull symbol: LST-906; Code letters: NTJJ
- Honors and awards: 1 × battle star
- Fate: Sold for scrap, 22 June 1945

General characteristics
- Class & type: LST-542-class tank landing ship
- Displacement: 1,625 long tons (1,651 t) (light); 4,080 long tons (4,145 t) (full (seagoing draft with 1,675 short tons (1,520 t) load); 2,366 long tons (2,404 t) (beaching)
- Length: 328 ft (100 m) oa
- Beam: 50 ft (15 m)
- Draft: Unloaded: 2 ft 4 in (0.71 m) forward; 7 ft 6 in (2.29 m) aft; Full load: 8 ft 3 in (2.51 m) forward; 14 ft 1 in (4.29 m) aft; Landing with 500 short tons (450 t) load: 3 ft 11 in (1.19 m) forward; 9 ft 10 in (3.00 m) aft; Limiting 11 ft 2 in (3.40 m); Maximum navigation 14 ft 1 in (4.29 m)
- Installed power: 2 × 900 hp (670 kW) Electro-Motive Diesel 12-567A diesel engines; 1,800 shp (1,300 kW)
- Propulsion: 1 × Falk main reduction gears; 2 × Propellers
- Speed: 11.6 kn (21.5 km/h; 13.3 mph)
- Range: 24,000 nmi (44,000 km; 28,000 mi) at 9 kn (17 km/h; 10 mph) while displacing 3,960 long tons (4,024 t)
- Boats & landing craft carried: 2 x LCVPs
- Capacity: 1,600–1,900 short tons (3,200,000–3,800,000 lb; 1,500,000–1,700,000 kg) cargo depending on mission
- Troops: 16 officers, 147 enlisted men
- Complement: 13 officers, 104 enlisted men
- Armament: Varied, ultimate armament; 2 × twin 40 mm (1.57 in) Bofors guns; 4 × single 40 mm Bofors guns; 12 × 20 mm (0.79 in) Oerlikon cannons
- Aircraft carried: 6 × L-4B "Grasshopper"
- Aviation facilities: Custom-built mesh airstrip

USS LST-906 was an LST-542-class tank landing ship in the United States Navy. Like many of her class, she was not named and is properly referred to by her hull designation.

== Construction ==
LST-906 was laid down on 24 January 1944, at Hingham, Massachusetts, by the Bethlehem-Hingham Shipyard; launched on 11 March 1944; sponsored by Mrs. Henry Levine; and commissioned on 27 April 1944.

== Service history ==
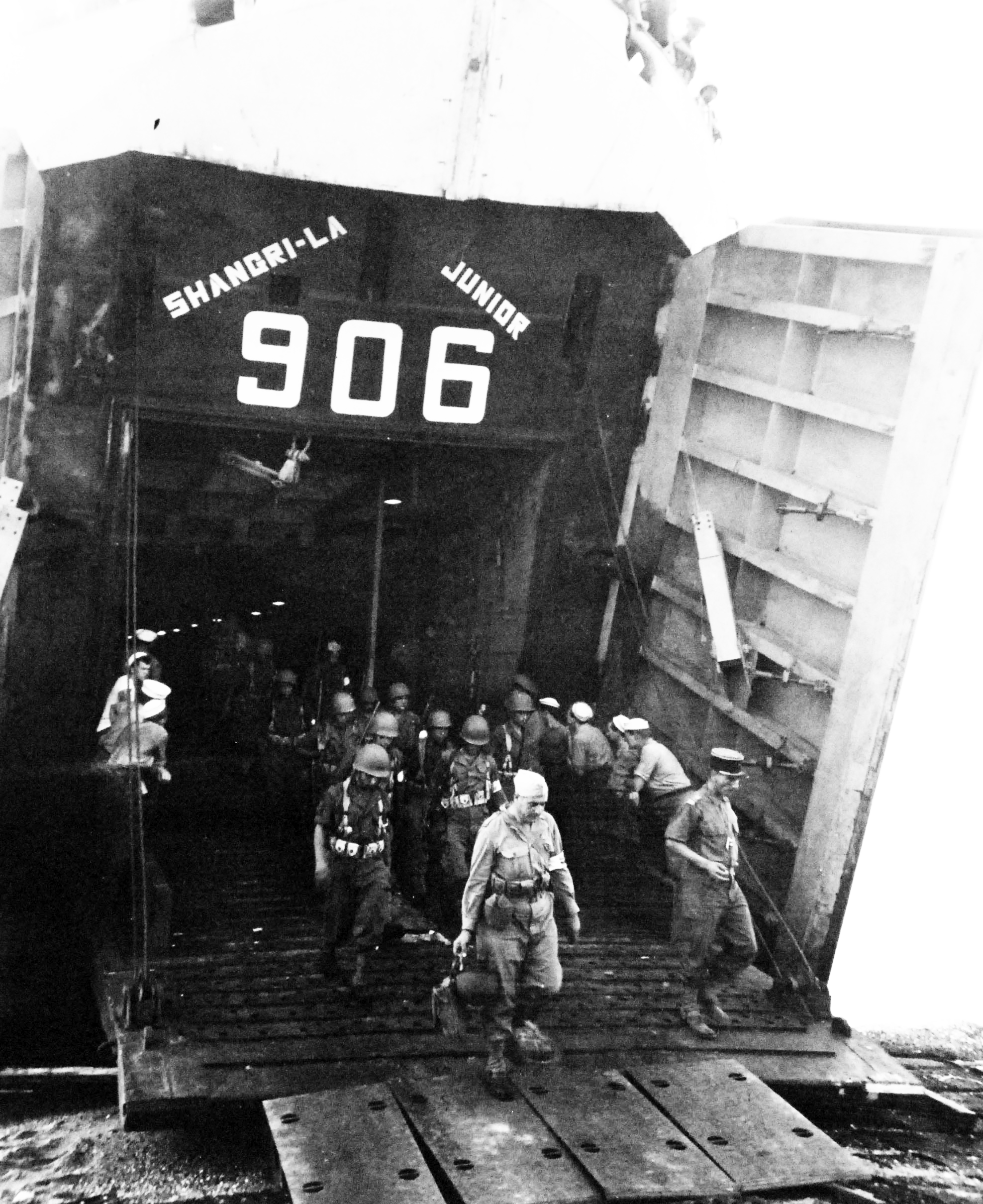
LST-906 during Invasion of Southern France, Toulon, August 1944

During World War II, LST-906 was assigned to the European Theatre.

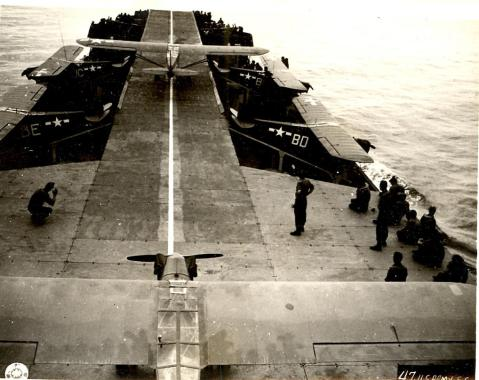
USS LST-906, with US Army Air Force L-4 Grasshopper on her flight deck being prepared for take-off. Note additional L-4 type aircraft stowed alongside the deck.

While in the Mediterranean, Seabees converted LST-906 into a makeshift aircraft carrier sporting a custom-built mesh airstrip above deck. She was the base for six USAAF L-4B "Grasshoppers" flown as artillery spotters for the US 3rd Infantry Division during the invasion of southern France in September 1944. LST-906 was one of six LSTs to be converted. The others being LST-16, LST-158, LST-337, LST-386, and LST-525.

While at anchor at Leghorn, Italy, heavy seas on 18 October 1944 caused LST-906 to drag anchor and run aground. On 6 December a storm caused further damage to the still-grounded ship.

The ship was decommissioned on 20 May 1945, struck from the Navy list on 22 June 1945, and sold for scrap soon thereafter.

== Awards ==
LST-906 earned one battle star for World War II service.

== Bibliography ==
Online resources

- "LST-906". Dictionary of American Naval Fighting Ships. Naval History and Heritage Command. This article incorporates text from this source, which is in the public domain.
- "Bethlehem-Hingham, Hingham MA". www.ShipbuildingHistory.com. 11 August 2011.
- "USS LST-906". NavSource. 20 January 2016.

Printed resources

- Cressman, Robert (2000). "Chapter VI: 1944". The official chronology of the U.S. Navy in World War II. Annapolis, Maryland: Naval Institute Press. ISBN 978-1-55750-149-3.
- Rottman, Gordon L.; Bryan, Tony (2005). Landing ship, tank (LST) 1942-2002. Oxford: Osprey. p. 47. ISBN 978-1-84176-923-3.
