= Hynson, Maryland =

Unincorporated community in Maryland, United States

- Unincorporated community
- Location within Maryland Location within the United States
- Coordinates: 38.7031704°N 75.8582682°W
- Country: United States
- State: Maryland
- County: Caroline
- Elevation: 46 ft (14 m)
- GNIS feature ID: 590528

Hynson, is an unincorporated community on Maryland's Eastern Shore in Caroline County, Maryland, United States. The earliest record of its existence is from the 1875 Map of Caroline County, where it is referred to as Newhope. In the 1897 Map of Caroline County, it is referred to as Hynson. The Hynson Post Office was located there, which operated from 1881 to 1907.
