= Maryland Route 314 =

State highway in Maryland, United States

Maryland Route 314
- Maryland Route 314 highlighted in red

Route information
- Maintained by MDSHA
- Length: 4.93 mi (7.93 km)
- Existed: 1927–present
- Tourist routes: Harriet Tubman Underground Railroad Byway

Major junctions
- West end: Sunset Avenue in Greensboro
- MD 480 in Greensboro; MD 313 in Greensboro
- East end: DE 12 in Whiteleysburg

Location
- Country: United States
- State: Maryland
- Counties: Caroline

Highway system
- Maryland highway system; Interstate; US; State; Scenic Byways
← MD 313	→ MD 315

Maryland Route 314 (MD 314) is a state highway in the U.S. state of Maryland. The state highway runs 4.93 miles (7.93 km) from the beginning of state maintenance along Sunset Avenue in Greensboro east to the Delaware state line in Whiteleysburg, where the highway continues east as Delaware Route 12 (DE 12). What is now MD 314 was paved in Greensboro in the 1910s. The remainder of the state highway to Whiteleysburg was constructed in the late 1920s. MD 314 west of MD 480 was originally MD 315. When MD 313 bypassed Greensboro in 1950, MD 314 was extended west to its present terminus.

== Route description ==
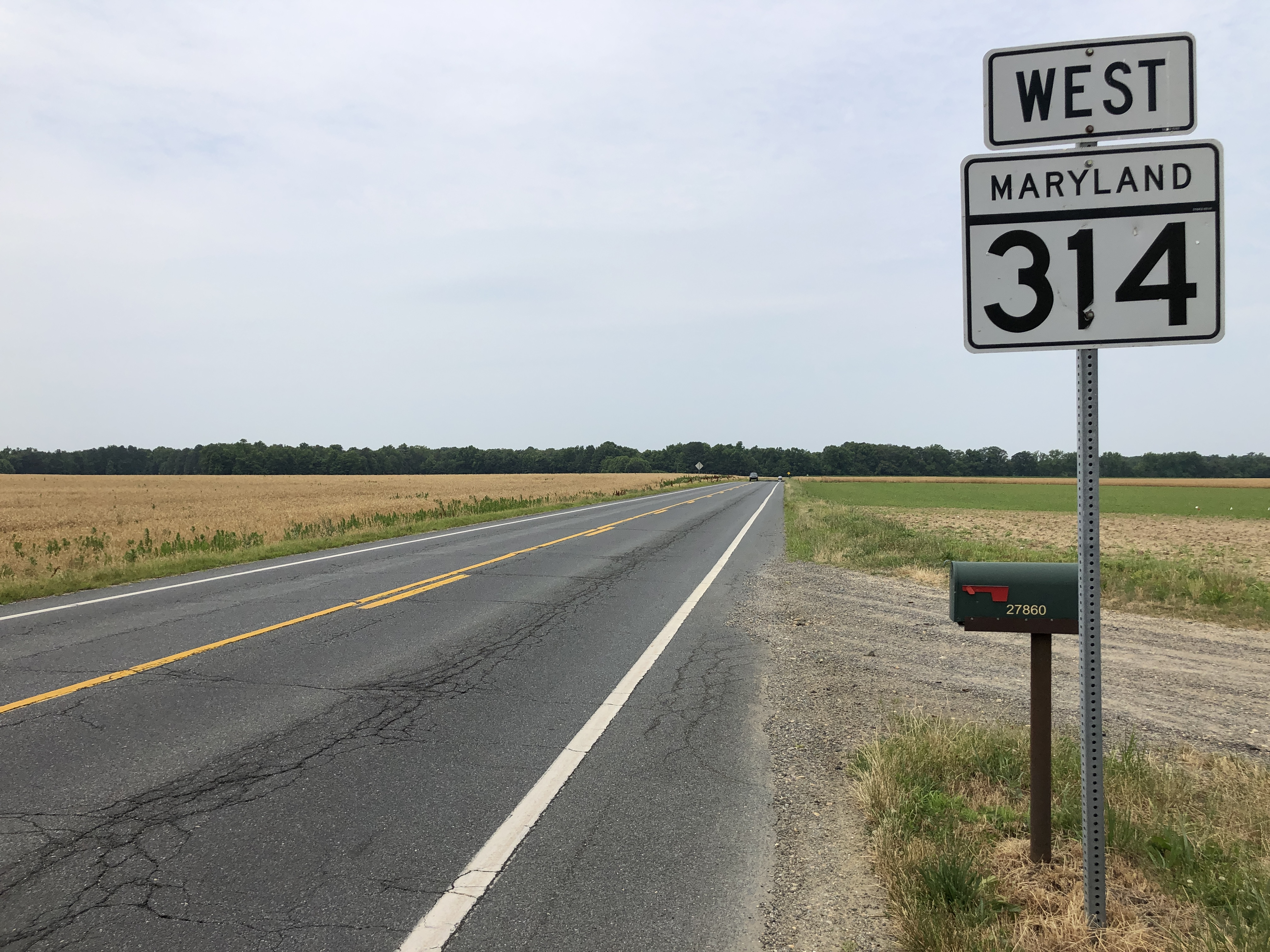
View west along MD 314 past the Delaware state line in Whiteleysburg

MD 314 begins in the town of Greensboro at a former railroad crossing with an unused railroad grade owned by the Maryland Department of Transportation between Cosden Street and Granby Street. Sunset Avenue continues west as a municipal street. MD 314 heads east as two-lane undivided Sunset Avenue toward the center of town, where the highway intersects MD 480 (Main Street). After crossing the Choptank River, the state highway meets MD 313 (Greensboro Road). MD 314 continues east as Whiteleysburg Road through the eastern part of Greensboro before it leaves the town limits and passes through farmland. Immediately before the Delaware state line in the hamlet of Whiteleysburg, Two State Road, which is unsigned MD 314A, splits to the east while the main road curves southeast. At the state line, MD 314 becomes DE 12, which immediately turns northeast onto Whites Lane, soon becoming Burnite Mill Road and heading toward the town of Felton. Meanwhile, Whiteleysburg Road continues southeast toward the city of Harrington.

== History ==
Maryland Route 315
- Location: Greensboro
- Existed: 1927–1950

Sunset Avenue in Greensboro was paved by 1910. A short stretch of Whiteleysburg Road was paved east of MD 313 by 1921. Whiteleysburg Road, the original portion of MD 314, was completed in 1929. Sunset Avenue west of Main Street was originally designated MD 315. MD 313 followed the portion of Sunset Avenue between the present intersection with MD 313 and Main Street, then headed north on Main Street toward Goldsboro. When the MD 313 bypass of Greensboro was completed in 1950, MD 314 was extended to its present western terminus, assuming the section of old MD 313 along Sunset Avenue and all of old MD 315.

== Junction list ==
The entire route is in Caroline County.

Location	mi	km	Destinations	Notes
Greensboro	0.00	0.00	Sunset Avenue west	Western terminus
Greensboro	0.66	1.06	MD 480 (Main Street) – Ridgely	
Greensboro	1.02	1.64	MD 313 (Greensboro Road) – Denton, Goldsboro	
Whiteleysburg	4.83	7.77	Two State Road east	Unsigned MD 314A; old alignment of MD 314
Whiteleysburg	4.93	7.93	DE 12 east (Whiteleysburg Road) – Harrington, Felton	Delaware state line; eastern terminus
1.000 mi = 1.609 km; 1.000 km = 0.621 mi

== Auxiliary route ==
Maryland Route 489
- Location: Whiteleysburg
- Existed: c. 1939–1950

MD 314A is the unsigned designation for Two State Road, a 0.10-mile (0.16 km) two-lane undivided spur from MD 314 to the Delaware state line at Whiteleysburg, where the spur quickly encounters DE 12. MD 314A is the old alignment of MD 314 at the Delaware state line. The present segment of MD 314 to the state line was originally MD 489, a designation that was removed by 1950.
