= Caroline County Courthouse =

Campbell County Courthouse may refer to:

- Caroline County Courthouse (Maryland)
- Caroline County Courthouse (Virginia), listed on the NRHP in Virginia
