= Marvin H. Smith =

American judge (1916–2010)

Judge of the Maryland Court of Appeals
- In office May 20, 1968 – August 10, 1986

Personal details
- Born: Marvin Hugh Smith; August 10, 1916 Federalsburg, Maryland, U.S.
- Died: September 27, 2010 (aged 94) Cambridge, Maryland, U.S.
- Resting place: Hillcrest Cemetery; Federalsburg, Maryland, U.S.
- Spouse: Rebecca Groves (m. 1942)
- Children: 3
- Education: Washington College (BA); University of Maryland Law School (LLB)
- Military career
- Allegiance: United States
- Branch: U.S. Army Counterintelligence Corps
- Service years: 1941–1945
- Conflicts: World War II

Marvin H. Smith (August 10, 1916 – September 27, 2010) was a jurist on the Maryland Court of Appeals from 1968 to 1986.

== Early life ==
Marvin Hugh Smith was born on August 10, 1916, in Federalsburg, Maryland to Jeannette (née Brown) and Charles H. Smith. He graduated from Federalsburg High School in 1933. He is credited as becoming the first Eagle Scout of Caroline County in 1934.

Smith graduated with a Bachelor of Arts from Washington College in 1937. He graduated with a LL.B. in 1941 from the University of Maryland Law School. He was admitted to the bar in Maryland in 1941.

== Career ==
=== Military career ===
Smith was inducted into the United States Army on November 18, 1941. During World War II, Smith served as a special agent in the U.S. Army Counterintelligence Corps (CIC) from 1941 to his discharge on November 24, 1945. He served in the Military District of Washington Detachment as Chief of the Review Section at the start of the war. Smith then served as Chief of the Administrative Section of the 705th CIC Detachment and was assigned to the Air Service Command in Dayton, Ohio. Smith then served as the Chief of the Review Section of the 706th CIC Detachment assigned to the Air Transport Command in Washington, D.C.

=== Law career ===
Smith began practicing law in Denton, Maryland in January 1946. He continued practicing in Denton until May 20, 1968. He also served on the Caroline County Board of Education from 1951 to 1953, serving as president from 1952 to 1953. Smith served as the assistant attorney general of Maryland from 1953 to 1955.

Smith was appointed associate judge on the Maryland Court of Appeals on May 20, 1968, and served in that role until his retirement on August 10, 1986. He also served twice on the Maryland State Bar Association's Board of Governors.

== Personal life ==
Smith married Rebecca Groves on February 21, 1942. Together they had three children: Melissa, M. Hugh and Sarah J.

He was an active Mason, member of the Rotary Club and scout leader with the Boy Scouts of America.

== Death ==
Smith died on September 27, 2010, at Dorchester General Hospital in Cambridge, Maryland. He is buried at Hillcrest Cemetery in Federalsburg.

== Awards ==
- 1980 – honorary LL.D. degree from Washington College
- 1984 – Alumnus of the Year, University of Maryland Law School
- 1986 – H. Vernon Eney Award, Maryland Bar Foundation

Political offices
Preceded by William R. Horney	Judge of the Maryland Court of Appeals; 1968–1986	Succeeded by
