= Gilpin Point, Maryland =

Unincorporated community in Maryland, United States

- Location within Maryland Location within the United States
- Coordinates: 38°48′30″N 75°53′50″W
- Country: United States
- State: Maryland
- County: Caroline

Gilpin Point is a cape on Maryland's Eastern Shore in Caroline County, Maryland, United States. It was the home of Revolutionary War soldier William Richardson, who distinguished himself in the Battle of Harlem Heights. There is a tomb dedicated to him next to Gilpin's Point Landing Park. It was placed by the Caroline County Historical Society in the 1950s.

== History ==
There was formerly a post office located here, referred to as Gilpin's Point P.O.
