= Caroline County Public Schools (Maryland) =

Public school district in Maryland, United States

Address
- 204 Franklin Street Denton, MD Delmarva Peninsula Denton, Caroline, Maryland; United States

District information
- Motto: One Family. One Vision
- Established: 1865
- Schools: 10

Other information
- Website: https://www.carolineschools.org/

Caroline County Public Schools is a public school system serving the residents of Caroline County, Maryland on Maryland's Eastern Shore. The main administrative branch is located at 204 Franklin Street in Denton, Maryland. The system serves approximately 5,500 students and more than 380 professional staff members.

== Administration ==
- Superintendent of Schools: Dr. Derek Simmons
- Assistant Superintendent: Dr. Tara Downes
- Director of Administrative Services: Robert Willoughby
- Director of Student Services: John Howie
- Director of College and Career Readiness: Lindsey McCormick
- Director of Powerschool: Tiffany Rein

== Board of education ==
- President: Arevia Michele Wayman
- Vice-President: Mark R. Jones
- Members: Chrissy Bartz, Stefanie Johnson, P. Troy Plutschak

== High schools ==
- North Caroline High School
- Colonel Richardson High School
- Caroline Career & Technology Center

== Middle schools ==
- Colonel Richardson Middle School
- Lockerman Middle School

== Elementary schools ==
- Denton Elementary School
- Federalsburg Elementary School
- Greensboro Elementary School
- Preston Elementary School
- Ridgely Elementary School

== Support Programs ==
- Early Head Start & Family Support Center
- Caroline County Judy Centers
