= Tanyard Creek =

Tanyard Creek may refer to:

- Tanyard Creek (Arkansas), a stream in Arkansas
- Tanyard Creek (Echeconnee Creek tributary), a stream in Georgia

== See also ==
- Tanyard Branch (disambiguation)
