= Whiteleysburg, Delaware =

Unincorporated community in Delaware, United States

- Unincorporated community
- Location within Delaware Location within the United States
- Coordinates: 38°57′27″N 75°43′54″W
- Country: United States
- State: Delaware
- County: Kent
- Elevation: 62 ft (19 m)
- Time zone: UTC-5 (Eastern (EST))
  - Summer (DST): UTC-4 (EDT)
- Area code: 302
- GNIS feature ID: 216249

Whiteleysburg is an unincorporated community in Kent County, Delaware, United States. Whiteleysburg is located at the intersection of Delaware Route 12 and Whiteleysburg Road, just east of the Maryland border.

== See also ==
- Whiteleysburg, Maryland
