= Delaware Route 12 =

State highway in Kent County, Delaware, United States

Delaware Route 12

Route information
- Maintained by DelDOT
- Length: 16.35 mi (26.31 km)
- Existed: 1936–present
- Tourist routes: Delaware Bayshore Byway

Major junctions
- West end: MD 314 in Whiteleysburg
- US 13 in Felton; DE 15 near Felton
- East end: DE 1 near Frederica

Location
- Country: United States
- State: Delaware
- Counties: Kent

Highway system
- Delaware State Route System; List; Byways
← DE 11	→ US 13

Delaware Route 12 (DE 12) is a state highway in Kent County, Delaware, United States. It runs from Maryland Route 314 (MD 314) at the Maryland border in Whiteleysburg east to an interchange with DE 1 near Frederica. The route follows a mostly rural alignment, passing through the towns of Felton and Frederica. DE 12 intersects U.S. Route 13 (US 13) in Felton and DE 15 east of Felton. What would become DE 12 was built as a state highway during the 1920s. DE 12 was designated between Felton and Frederica by 1936 and extended west to the Maryland border by 1938. The eastern terminus was moved to its current location in 1965 when US 113 (now DE 1) was routed to bypass Frederica to the east. The DE 1 intersection became an interchange in 2011.

== Route description ==
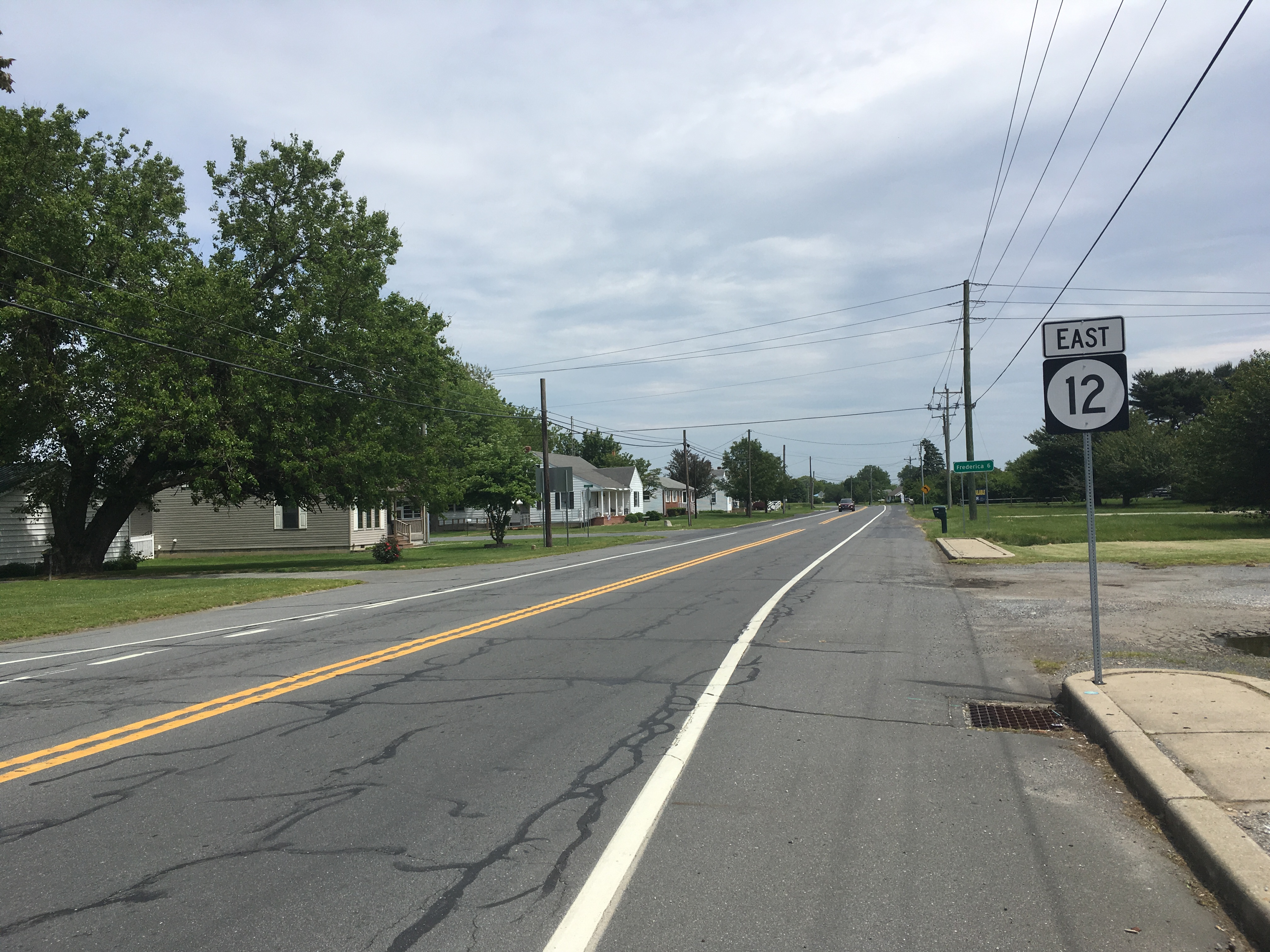
DE 12 eastbound past US 13 in Felton

DE 12 begins at the Maryland border in the community of Whiteleysburg, with the road continuing west into that state as MD 314. From the state line, the route heads southeast on two-lane undivided Whiteleysburg Road briefly before turning northeast onto Whites Lane. A short distance later, DE 12 intersects Two State Road and becomes Burnite Mill Road. The road runs through farmland with some woods and homes, passing through the community of Hollandsville. The route intersects Sandtown Road before it curves east and enters the town of Felton. At this point, DE 12 becomes West Main Street and heads into residential areas, crossing the Delmarva Central Railroad's Delmarva Subdivision line at-grade. The road name changes to East Main Street and it comes to an intersection with US 13 near businesses on the eastern edge of Felton.

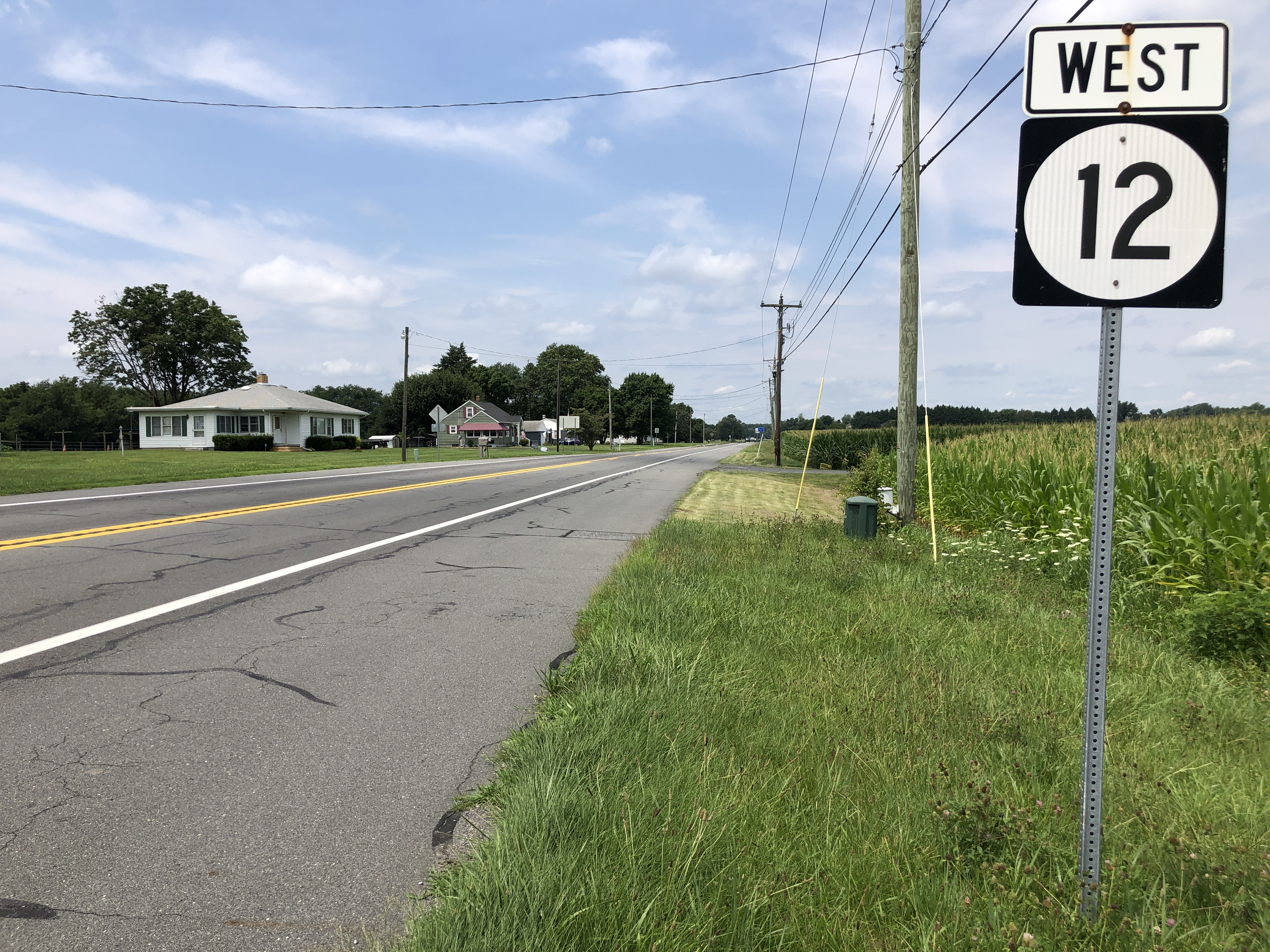
DE 12 westbound west of Frederica

Upon leaving Felton, the route becomes Midstate Road and continues through agricultural areas with some woods and homes, passing to the north of the geographic center of Delaware. DE 12 crosses DE 15 and comes to a junction with Andrews Lake Road, where the name changes to Johnnycake Landing Road. The road passes through more rural areas before intersecting Carpenter Bridge Road and entering the town of Frederica, where it becomes West Front Street and is lined with homes. In the eastern part of town, the route splits into the one-way pair of West David Street eastbound and West Front Street westbound. Upon crossing Market Street, the one-way pair becomes East David Street eastbound and East Front Street westbound. DE 12 turns north onto two-way, two-lane undivided Frederica Road and passes through marshland, leaving Frederica upon crossing Spring Creek, a tributary of the Murderkill River. DE 12 continues to its eastern terminus at an interchange with DE 1.

The section of the route between Frederica Road and DE 1 in Frederica is designated as part of the Delaware Bayshore Byway, a Delaware Byway and National Scenic Byway. DE 12 has an annual average daily traffic count ranging from a high of 6,719 vehicles at the eastern border of Felton to a low of 1,244 vehicles at the Sandtown Road intersection.

== History ==
What is now DE 12 existed as an unimproved county road by 1920. By 1924, the route was completed as a state highway between Hollandsville and Frederica and was proposed as a state highway between the Maryland border in Whiteleysburg and Hollandsville and within Frederica. The entire road between Whiteleysburg and Frederica was built as a state highway a year later. DE 12 was designated to run from US 13 in Felton east to US 113 (now Frederica Road) in Frederica by 1936. By 1938, DE 12 was extended west to the Maryland border in Whiteleysburg.

In 1965, US 113 was moved to a bypass to the east of Frederica, and DE 12 was extended north on the former alignment of US 113 to end at that route a short distance north of Frederica. In November 2009, construction began for a grade-separated interchange at DE 1 (which had replaced US 113); the interchange was completed in June 2011.

== Major intersections ==
The entire route is in Kent County.

Location	mi	km	Destinations	Notes
Whiteleysburg	0.00	0.00	MD 314 west (Whiteleysburg Road) – Greensboro, Bay Bridge	Maryland state line; western terminus
Felton	10.00	16.09	US 13 (South Dupont Highway) – Dover, Harrington	
	12.40	19.96	DE 15 (Canterbury Road) – Canterbury, Milford	
Frederica	16.35	26.31	DE 1 (Bay Road) – Dover, Milford	DE 1 exit 86; eastern terminus
1.000 mi = 1.609 km; 1.000 km = 0.621 mi
