= Jumptown, Maryland =

Unincorporated community in Maryland, U.S.

Coordinates: 38°57′40″N 75°55′07″W

Jumptown is an unincorporated community in Caroline County, Maryland, United States.

The American Discovery Trail runs through the village.
