= Brick Wall Landing, Maryland =

Unincorporated community in Maryland, United States

- Populated place
- Location within Maryland Location within the United States
- Coordinates: 38°55′46″N 75°50′02″W
- Country: United States
- State: Maryland
- County: Caroline
- Elevation: 7 ft (2.1 m)
- Time zone: UTC−5 (Eastern (EST))
  - Summer (DST): UTC−4 (EDT)
- GNIS feature ID: 589811

Brick Wall Landing is a populated place in Caroline County, Maryland, United States. The settlement is located on the Choptank River, 3.2 mi (5.1 km) north of Denton. Variant names for the settlement include "Brick Mill Landing" and "Hardcastle Landing".

== History ==
Robert Hardcastle arrived from England in 1748 and settled at this location. Around 1790, Robert or his son John erected a grist mill, as well as a two-story brick house which depicted "the affluence of a miller during the late eighteenth and early nineteenth century". The Hardcastles prospered in the county as millers, businessmen, land owners and slave owners, while their location on the river became a local shipping center and turning point for boats. The mill was torn down around 1900, while the extant "Hardcastle Mill House" is today listed on the Maryland Historical Trust.
