= 2016 United States presidential election in Maryland =

- November 8, 2016
- Turnout: 71.98% (▼2.02 pp)

Nominee	Hillary Clinton	Donald Trump
Party	Democratic	Republican
Home state	New York	New York
Running mate	Tim Kaine	Mike Pence
Electoral vote	10	0
Popular vote	1,677,928	943,169
Percentage	60.33%	33.91%

Clinton
40–50%
50–60%
60–70%
70–80%
80–90%
90–100%
Trump
40–50%
50–60%
60–70%
70–80%
80–90%
90–100%
Tie/No Data
President before election
Barack Obama
Democratic
Elected President
Donald Trump
Republican

Treemap of the popular vote by county.

The 2016 United States presidential election in Maryland was held on Tuesday, November 8, 2016, as part of the 2016 United States presidential election in which all 50 states plus the District of Columbia participated. Maryland voters chose electors to represent them in the Electoral College via a popular vote, pitting the Republican Party's nominee, businessman Donald Trump, and running mate Indiana Governor Mike Pence against Democratic Party nominee, former Secretary of State Hillary Clinton, and her running mate Virginia Senator Tim Kaine. Maryland has 10 electoral votes in the Electoral College.

Clinton won Maryland with 60.3% of the vote, while Trump received 33.9%. Maryland was among the eleven states (and the District of Columbia) in which Clinton improved on Barack Obama's 2012 raw vote total, although by just 84 votes. Maryland was one of four states in which Clinton received over 60% of the vote, the others being Massachusetts, Hawaii, and California. However, Maryland was the only one of those eleven states to have voted more Democratic in both 2012 and 2016. In this election, Maryland voted 24.32% to the left of the nation at-large.

Clinton continued the tradition of Democratic dominance in the state of Maryland, capturing large majorities of the vote in the densely populated and heavily nonwhite Democratic Baltimore–Washington metropolitan area, while Trump easily outperformed her in more white, sparsely populated regions elsewhere in the state that tend to vote Republican. While Republicans typically win more counties, they are usually swamped by the heavily Democratic counties between Baltimore and Washington. Though Trump won 17 of Maryland's 24 county-level jurisdictions, the state's four largest county-level jurisdictions—Montgomery, Prince George's and Baltimore counties and the City of Baltimore—all broke for Clinton by double digits, enough to deliver the state to her.

Clinton became the first Democrat to win Anne Arundel County, home to the state capital of Annapolis, since Lyndon B. Johnson in 1964. Therefore, Trump became the first Republican to win the White House without carrying Anne Arundel County since Calvin Coolidge in 1924.

== Primary elections ==
Maryland's presidential primaries were held on April 26, 2016.

=== Democratic primary ===
Election results by county. Hillary Clinton Bernie Sanders

Maryland Democratic primary, April 26, 2016
Candidate	Popular vote		Estimated delegates		
Candidate	Count	Percentage	Pledged	Unpledged	Total
Hillary Clinton	573,242	62.53%	60	17	77
Bernie Sanders	309,990	33.81%	35	1	36
Rocky De La Fuente	3,582	0.39%	—N/a		
Uncommitted	29,949	3.27%	0	6	6
Total	916,763	100%	95	24	119

=== Republican primary ===
Election results by county. Donald Trump

Maryland Republican primary, April 26, 2016
Candidate	Votes	Percentage	Actual delegate count		
Candidate	Votes	Percentage	Bound	Unbound	Total
Donald Trump	248,343	54.10%	38	0	38
John Kasich	106,614	23.22%	0	0	0
Ted Cruz	87,093	18.97%	0	0	0
Ben Carson (withdrawn)	5,946	1.30%	0	0	0
Marco Rubio (withdrawn)	3,201	0.70%	0	0	0
Jeb Bush (withdrawn)	2,770	0.60%	0	0	0
Rand Paul (withdrawn)	1,533	0.33%	0	0	0
Chris Christie (withdrawn)	1,239	0.27%	0	0	0
Carly Fiorina (withdrawn)	1,012	0.22%	0	0	0
Mike Huckabee (withdrawn)	837	0.18%	0	0	0
Rick Santorum (withdrawn)	478	0.10%	0	0	0
Unprojected delegates:			0	0	0
Total:	459,066	100.00%	38	0	38
Source: The Green Papers

=== Minor parties ===
==== Green primary ====
		Winning			Projected delegates							
June 12	Maryland	Jill Stein	51	96%	6	0	0	0	0	0	0	6

==== Libertarian convention ====
Libertarian National Convention, Maryland Delegate Vote (round one)
Candidate	Delegate Votes	Percentage
Gary Johnson	10	56%
Marc Allan Feldman	4	22%
Darryl W. Perry	2	11%
Austin Petersen	2	11%
Others	-	-
Total	18	100%

Libertarian National Convention, Maryland Delegate Vote (round two)
Candidate	Delegate Votes	Percentage
Gary Johnson	10	67%
Marc Allan Feldman	2	13%
Darryl W. Perry	2	13%
John McAfee	1	7%
Others	-	-
Total	15	100%

== General election ==
=== Predictions ===
Source	Ranking	As of
Los Angeles Times	Safe D	November 6, 2016
CNN	Safe D	November 4, 2016
Cook Political Report	Safe D	November 7, 2016
Electoral-vote.com	Safe D	November 8, 2016
Rothenberg Political Report	Safe D	November 7, 2016
Sabato's Crystal Ball	Safe D	November 7, 2016
RealClearPolitics	Safe D	November 8, 2016
Fox News	Safe D	November 7, 2016

=== Results ===
2016 United States presidential election in Maryland
Party	Candidate	Running mate	Votes	%	Electoral votes
Democratic	Hillary Clinton	Tim Kaine	1,677,928	60.33%	10
Republican	Donald Trump	Mike Pence	943,169	33.91%	0
Libertarian	Gary Johnson	William Weld	79,605	2.86%	0
Green	Jill Stein	Ajamu Baraka	35,945	1.29%	0
Others	Write ins		44,799	1.61%	0
Total			2,781,446	100.00%	10

==== By county ====
County	Hillary Clinton Democratic		Donald Trump Republican		Various candidates Other parties		Margin		Total votes cast
County	#	%	#	%	#	%	#	%	Total votes cast
Allegany	7,875	25.69%	21,270	69.39%	1,509	4.92%	−13,395	−43.70%	30,654
Anne Arundel	128,419	47.55%	122,403	45.32%	19,259	7.13%	6,016	2.23%	270,081
Baltimore	218,412	55.91%	149,477	38.26%	22,793	5.83%	68,935	17.65%	390,682
Baltimore City	202,673	84.66%	25,205	10.53%	11,524	4.81%	177,468	74.13%	239,402
Calvert	18,225	38.44%	26,176	55.21%	3,007	6.35%	−7,951	−16.77%	47,408
Caroline	4,009	28.41%	9,368	66.38%	736	5.21%	−5,359	−37.97%	14,113
Carroll	26,567	28.92%	58,215	63.38%	7,066	7.70%	−31,648	−34.46%	91,848
Cecil	13,650	30.15%	28,868	63.77%	2,751	6.08%	−15,218	−33.62%	45,269
Charles	49,341	63.01%	25,614	32.71%	3,348	4.28%	23,727	30.30%	78,303
Dorchester	6,245	41.02%	8,413	55.26%	567	3.72%	−2,168	−14.24%	15,225
Frederick	56,522	44.97%	59,522	47.36%	9,633	7.67%	−3,000	−2.39%	125,677
Garrett	2,567	18.32%	10,776	76.91%	668	4.77%	−8,209	−58.59%	14,011
Harford	47,077	35.22%	77,860	58.25%	8,735	6.53%	−30,783	−23.03%	133,672
Howard	102,597	63.26%	47,484	29.28%	12,112	7.46%	55,113	33.98%	162,193
Kent	4,575	45.65%	4,876	48.66%	570	5.69%	−301	−3.01%	10,021
Montgomery	357,837	74.72%	92,704	19.36%	28,332	5.92%	265,133	55.36%	478,873
Prince George's	344,049	88.13%	32,811	8.40%	13,525	3.47%	311,238	79.73%	390,385
Queen Anne's	7,973	30.06%	16,993	64.07%	1,557	5.87%	−9,020	−34.01%	26,523
St. Mary's	17,534	35.18%	28,663	57.51%	3,645	7.31%	−11,129	−22.33%	49,842
Somerset	4,196	42.38%	5,341	53.95%	363	3.67%	−1,145	−11.57%	9,900
Talbot	8,653	42.10%	10,724	52.18%	1,176	5.72%	−2,071	−10.08%	20,553
Washington	21,129	32.02%	40,998	62.13%	3,864	5.85%	−19,869	−30.11%	65,991
Wicomico	18,050	42.42%	22,198	52.17%	2,299	5.41%	−4,148	−9.75%	42,547
Worcester	9,753	34.50%	17,210	60.87%	1,310	4.63%	−7,457	−26.37%	28,273
Totals	1,677,928	60.33%	943,169	33.91%	160,349	5.76%	734,759	26.42%	2,781,446

County that flipped from Democratic to Republican

- Somerset (largest town: Princess Anne)

County that flipped from Republican to Democratic

- Anne Arundel (largest community: Glen Burnie)

==== By congressional district ====
Clinton won seven of the state's eight congressional districts.

District	Clinton	Trump	Representative
1st	33%	61%	Andy Harris
2nd	59%	35%	Dutch Ruppersberger
3rd	62%	32%	John Sarbanes
4th	77%	19%	Donna Edwards
4th	77%	19%	Anthony Brown
5th	63%	32%	Steny Hoyer
6th	55%	39%	John Delaney
7th	74%	20%	Elijah Cummings
8th	63%	30%	Chris Van Hollen
8th	63%	30%	Jamie Raskin

== See also ==
- United States presidential elections in Maryland
- 2016 Democratic Party presidential debates and forums
- 2016 Democratic Party presidential primaries
- 2016 Republican Party presidential debates and forums
- 2016 Republican Party presidential primaries
