= William Richardson (Maryland politician) =

American politician and soldier (1735–1825)

Member of the Maryland General Assembly
- In office 1771, 1773–1776

Personal details
- Born: August 17, 1735 Talbot County, Maryland, U.S.
- Died: June 24, 1825 (aged 89) Gilpin Point, Caroline County, Maryland, U.S.
- Resting place: Gilpin Point, Maryland, U.S.
- Spouse: Elizabeth Green
- Children: 7
- Occupation: Politician; soldier; planter; merchant
- Military career
- Allegiance: United States
- Branch: Continental Army
- Service years: 1776–1782
- Rank: Colonel
- Units: 4th Maryland Regiment; 5th Maryland Regiment
- Conflicts: American Revolution; Battle of Harlem Heights; Battle of Camden

William Richardson (August 17, 1735 – June 24, 1825) was a Maryland politician and Continental Army officer.

== Early life ==
William Richardson was born on August 17, 1735, in Talbot County, Maryland. He was the son of Ann (née Webb) and William Richardson. As a young man, Richardson moved to Dorchester County.

== Career ==
Richardson lived on a plantation called Gilpin Point. He worked as a planter and merchant, trading with England.

=== Military career ===
In 1776, Richardson was commissioned as a colonel of the 4th Maryland Regiment of the Flying Camp and served from July to December 1776. He was at the Battle of Harlem Heights. From December 1776 to October 1779, he was the Colonel of the 5th Maryland Regiment of the Maryland Line. He helped quell an insurrection of Loyalists in Somerset and Worcester County in 1777.

During the Philadelphia campaign, Richardson was charged with moving the Continental Treasury from Philadelphia to Baltimore in 1777. He fought at the Battle of Camden in 1780. He was away from Maryland between June 1780 and March 1782. During part of this time, he was held captive in England.

=== Political career ===
Richardon was first elected to the Maryland Assembly in 1771. Richardson then served in the Maryland Assembly from 1773 to 1776, introducing the bill that formed Caroline County in 1774. He was a delegate to the Maryland State Convention of 1788, to vote whether Maryland should ratify the proposed Constitution of the United States. He later served as a Presidential Elector in 1789 and 1792.

=== Later career ===
Richardson served as an associate justice for the 4th district court from 1791 to 1793. He was the treasurer of the Eastern Shore from 1789 to 1802 and from 1813 to 1825.

== Personal life ==
Richardson married Elizabeth Green. Together, they had seven children: William, Daniel Peter, Joseph, Thomas, Ann Webb, Mary and Elizabeth. His wife died in 1811.

Richardson, like many wealthy Marylanders of his time, was a slaveholder. In his will of June 19, 1823, Richardson made bequests of over fifty enslaved persons to approximately thirty of his own family members.

== Death ==
Richardson died on June 24, 1825, at Gilpin Point in Caroline County. He is buried at Gilpin Point.

== Legacy ==
Colonel Richardson High School and Colonel Richardson Middle School in Federalsburg, Maryland are named for him.
