= Tanyard Branch =

Tanyard Branch may refer to:

- Tanyard Branch (Marshyhope Creek tributary), a stream in Delaware
- Tanyard Branch (Yahoola Creek tributary), a stream in Georgia
- Tanyard Branch (Salt River tributary), a stream in Missouri
- Tanyard Branch (Cherrystone Creek tributary), a stream in Pittsylvania County, Virginia

== See also ==
- Tanyard Creek (disambiguation)
