= North Caroline High School =

North Caroline high school
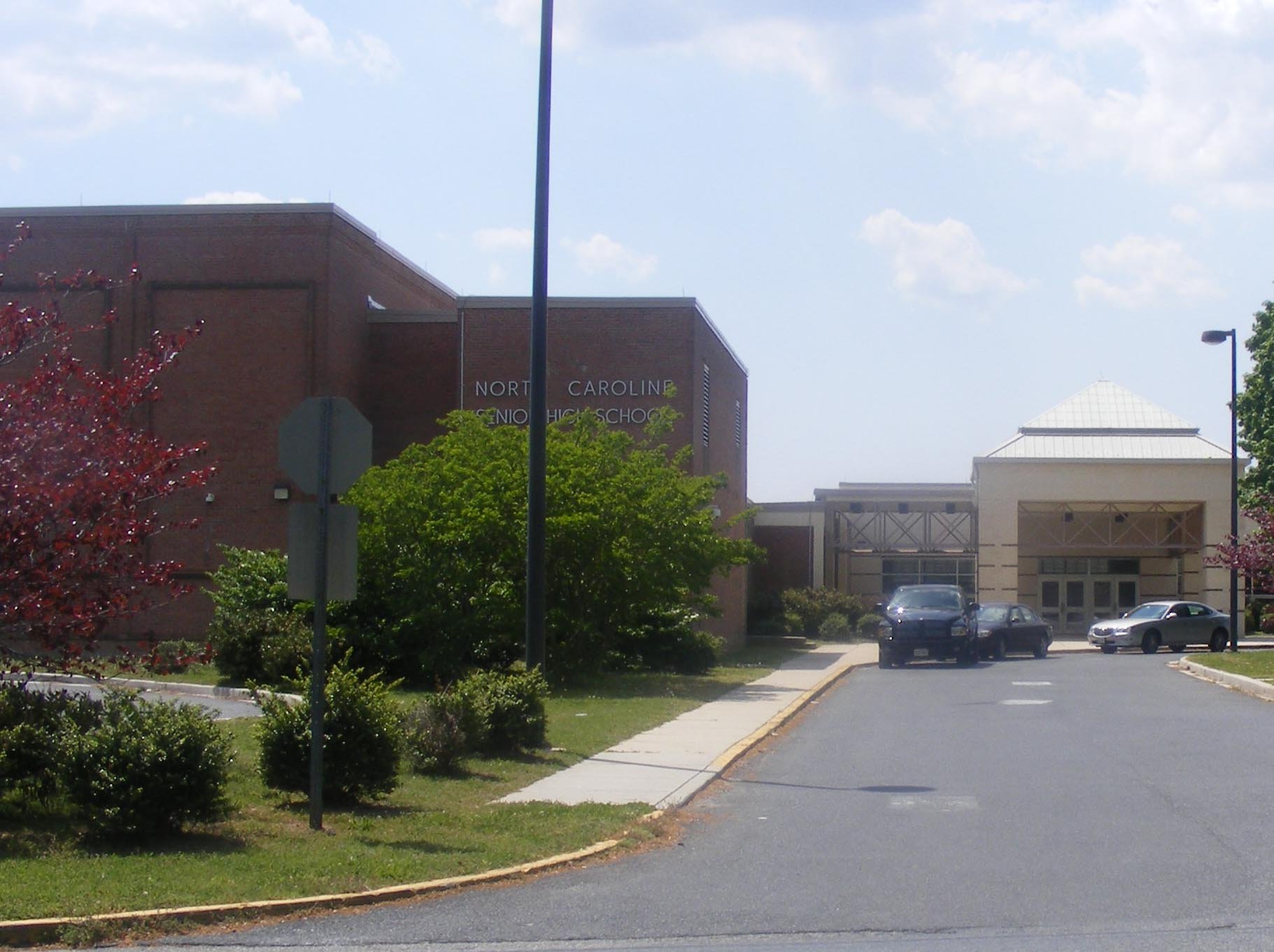

Location
- Ridgely, Maryland; United States; 38°54′30.5″N 75°50′29″W

Information
- Type: Public Secondary
- Motto: "We Are Bulldogs"
- School district: Caroline County Public Schools (Maryland)
- Principal: Matt Spiker
- Teaching staff: 170
- Grades: 9–12
- Enrollment: 1,114
- Campus: Rural
- Colors: White and Blue
- Mascot: Bulldogs
- Nickname: "The Ridge"
- Newspaper: The Northern Light
- Yearbook: The North Carolinean
- Website: North Caroline High School

North Caroline High School is located in Ridgely, Maryland, United States and is part of the Caroline County Public Schools (Maryland) system. It is one of two high schools in Caroline County. The school serves 1,114 in grades nine to twelve. Students generally live in the northern area of Caroline County in Ridgely, Greensboro, Denton, and a number of smaller towns. Lockerman Middle School serves as the feeder school.

North Caroline High School is ranked 125th within Maryland by U.S. News, and #6,863 nationally in 2019.

== Administration ==
- Principal: Matt Spiker

== Academics ==
Students are grouped into one of the following clusters based on their future career choices:

- Health and Human Services
- Business and Consumer Services
- Engineering and Manufacturing
- Environmental and Natural Resources
- Arts/Media and Communications

Within these clusters, students choose majors that dictate their course choices.

Students have the opportunity of simultaneously attending the Caroline Career and Technology Center located adjacent to the school building.

NCHS also offers a growing number of Advanced Placement courses, including Art, Biology, Calculus AB, English Language, English Literature, French Language, Government and Politics, Psychology, Spanish Language, and U.S. History. The AP participation rate is 32%, with an exam pass rate of 61%.

According to the 2018-2019 School Report Card, 49.6% percent of students were proficient or higher on state tests in Mathematics, and 52.1% of students were proficient or higher in English Language Arts.

The school received a 4/5 star rating on the 2018-19 MD Report Card, ranking in the 47th percentile for Maryland Public Schools.

== Athletics ==
Students at NCHS can participate in the following sports:

- Cheerleading
- Cross Country
- Field Hockey
- Football
- Golf (State Champions – 1997)
- Boys' Soccer
- Girls' Soccer
- Volleyball (State Champions – 1990)
- Boys' Basketball (State Champions – 1987)
- Girls' Basketball
- Indoor Track
- Wrestling Archived 8 March 2017 at the Wayback Machine
- Baseball (State Champions – 1998, 2011)
- Softball (State Champions – 1988, 1991, 2001, 2003, 2005, 2017)
- Lacrosse
- Tennis
- Track and Field

NCHS sports teams participate in the Maryland 2A division, as based on their enrollment numbers.

In 1987, the Maryland Public Secondary Schools Athletics Association awarded NCHS the Jack Willard Memorial Award during the boys' and girls' state basketball tournaments in recognition of their superior sportsmanship during the tournament.

== Clubs and organizations ==
Students at NCHS can participate in the following clubs and organizations:

- Fellowship of Christian Athletes
- Yearbook
- Art Club
- Drama Club
- Band
- National Honor Society
- Color Guard
- L.A.S.T.
- National History Day Club
- Student Government Association
- Strategic Games Club
- Film Club

== Demographics ==
As of 2019, the student population consists of the following ethnicities:

- White: 66%
- Black: 12%
- Hispanic: 15%
- Asian/Pacific Islander: <1%
- American Indian/Alaskan Native: <1%
- Bi/Multi-Racial: 6%

31% of the students are eligible for the free or reduced-price lunch program.

Four-year adjusted cohort graduation rate is 80.4%, with 81.8% graduating in five or fewer years.

The dropout rate for the 2018-19 school year was 8.37%.
