= Oakland, Caroline County, Maryland =

Unincorporated community in Maryland, U.S.

Coordinates: 38°59′19″N 75°52′34″W

Oakland is an unincorporated community in Caroline County, Maryland, United States.
