= 1964 United States presidential election in Maryland =

- November 3, 1964

Nominee	Lyndon B. Johnson	Barry Goldwater
Party	Democratic	Republican
Home state	Texas	Arizona
Running mate	Hubert Humphrey	William E. Miller
Electoral vote	10	0
Popular vote	730,912	385,495
Percentage	65.47%	34.53%
County results
Johnson
50–60%
60–70%
70–80%
Goldwater
50–60%
President before election
Lyndon B. Johnson
Democratic
Elected President
Lyndon B. Johnson
Democratic

The 1964 United States presidential election in Maryland took place on November 3, 1964, as part of the 1964 United States presidential election. State voters chose 10 representatives, or electors, to the Electoral College, who voted for president and vice president.

== Primary ==
=== Democratic primary ===
1964 Maryland Democratic presidential primary
- May 19, 1964
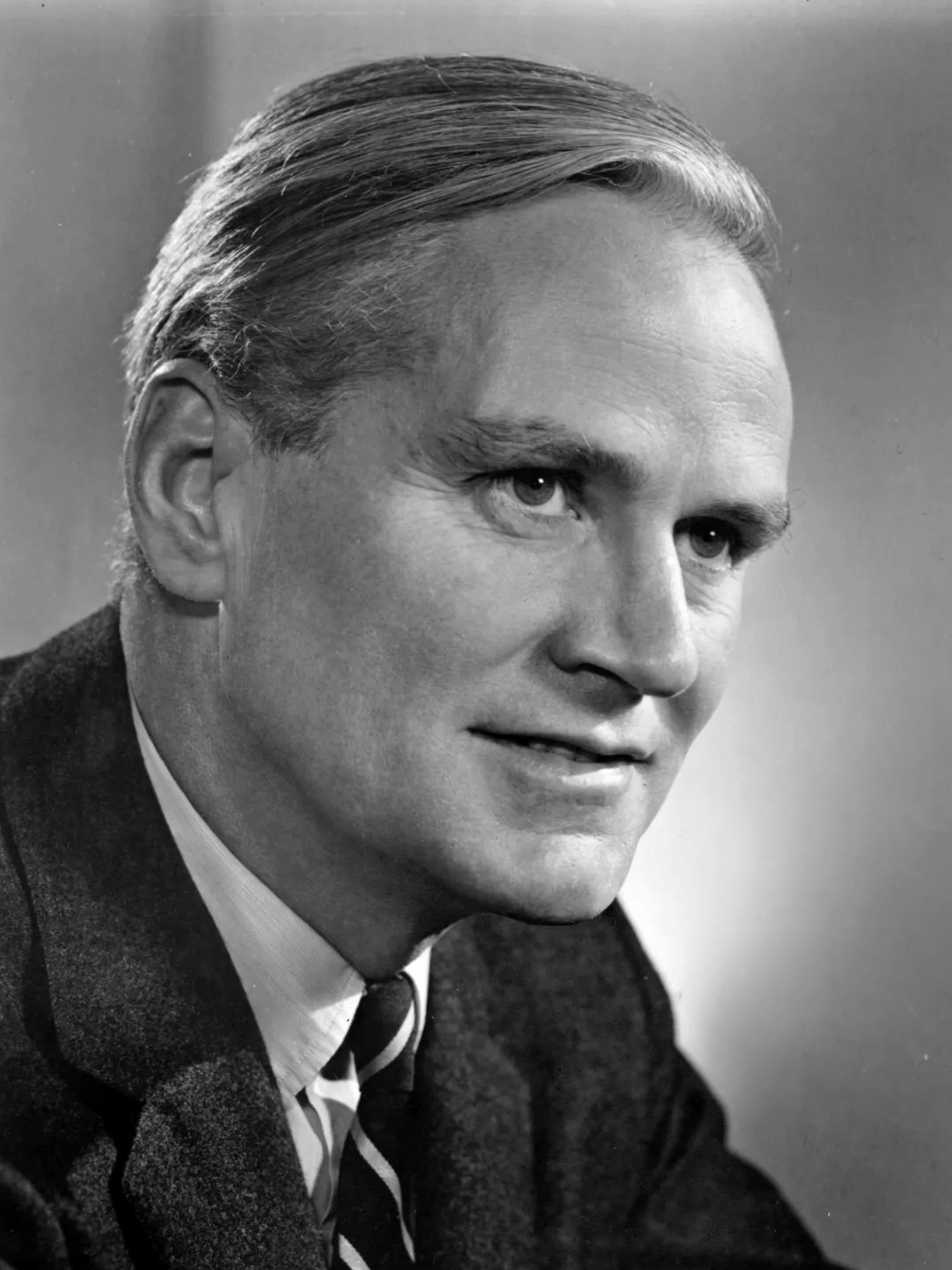

Candidate	Daniel Brewster	George Wallace
Home state	Maryland	Alabama
Popular vote	267,106	214,849
Percentage	53.14%	42.75%
County Results
Brewster
40-50%
50-60%
60-70%
70-80%
Wallace
40-50%
50-60%
60-70%
70-80%
80-90%

1964 Maryland Democratic presidential primary
Candidate	Votes	%
Daniel Brewster	267,106	53.14
George Wallace (write-in)	214,849	42.75
Unpledged	12,377	2.46
Andrew J. Easter	8,275	1.65
Total	502,607	100.0

== Campaign ==
George Wallace ran in the Democratic primary, but was defeated by U.S. Senator Daniel Brewster, who served as a surrogate for Johnson. Wallace won a majority of the white vote.

As of the 2016 presidential election, this is the last election in which Harford County, Carroll County, Washington County, Wicomico County, Worcester County, Queen Anne's County and Caroline County voted for a Democratic presidential candidate.

Anne Arundel County would not vote Democratic again until 2016, while Frederick and Talbot counties would not do so until 2020, with Donald Trump being the first Republican to lose all three of these counties, as well as the statewide white vote, since this election. However, Dorchester County on the Eastern Shore flipped against the trend from Kennedy to Goldwater, reflecting the racial tension in the area at this time and the declaration of martial law in the county by Governor J. Millard Tawes in response; similarly, it would be the only county in the state where George Wallace (who had given a speech there during the 1964 primary campaign) finished in second place four years later, ahead of Democratic Vice President Hubert Humphrey.

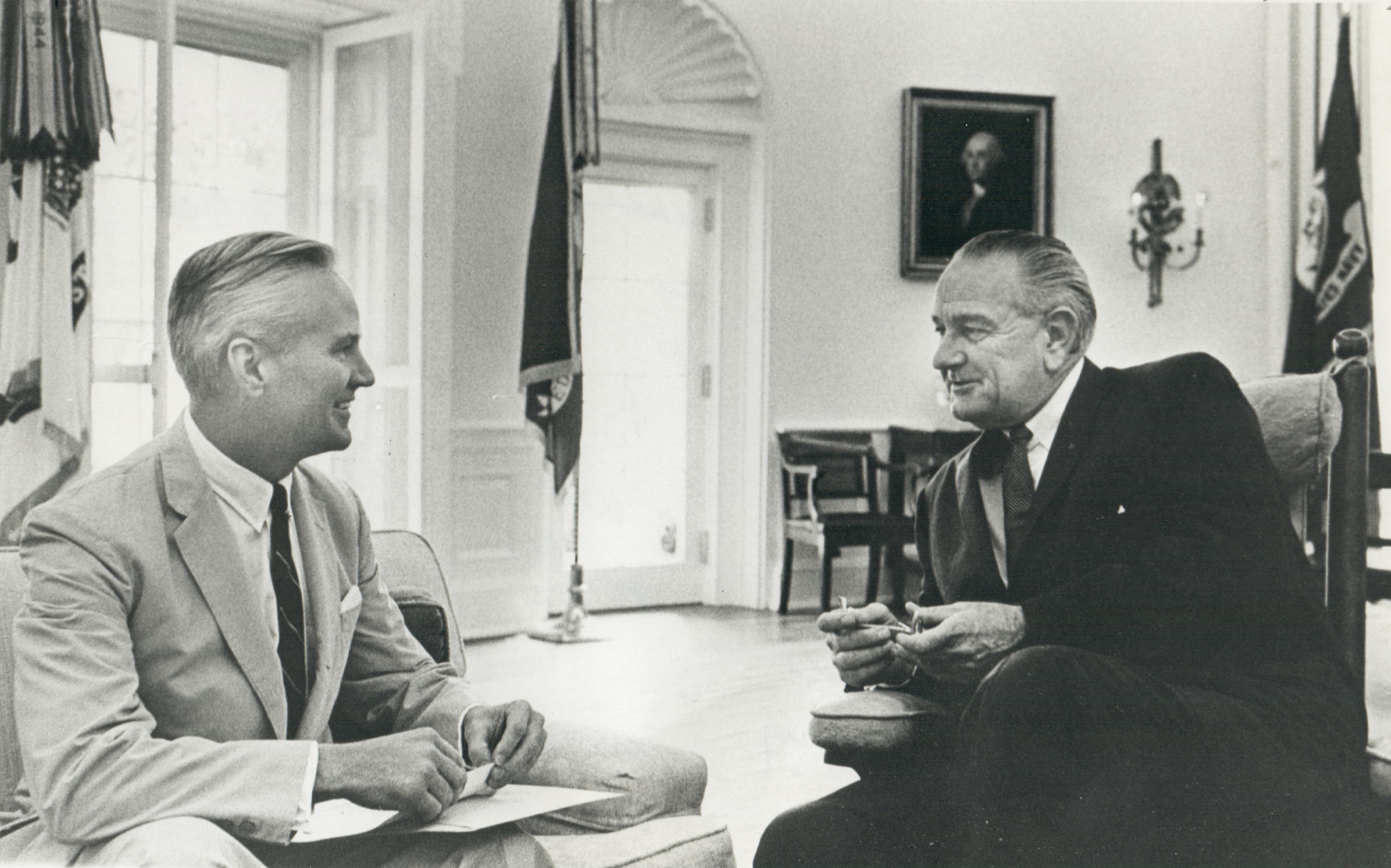
After Senator Daniel Brewster defeated Governor George Wallace in the Maryland presidential primary, President Johnson invited Brewster to the Oval Office to thank him for running as the President’s surrogate.

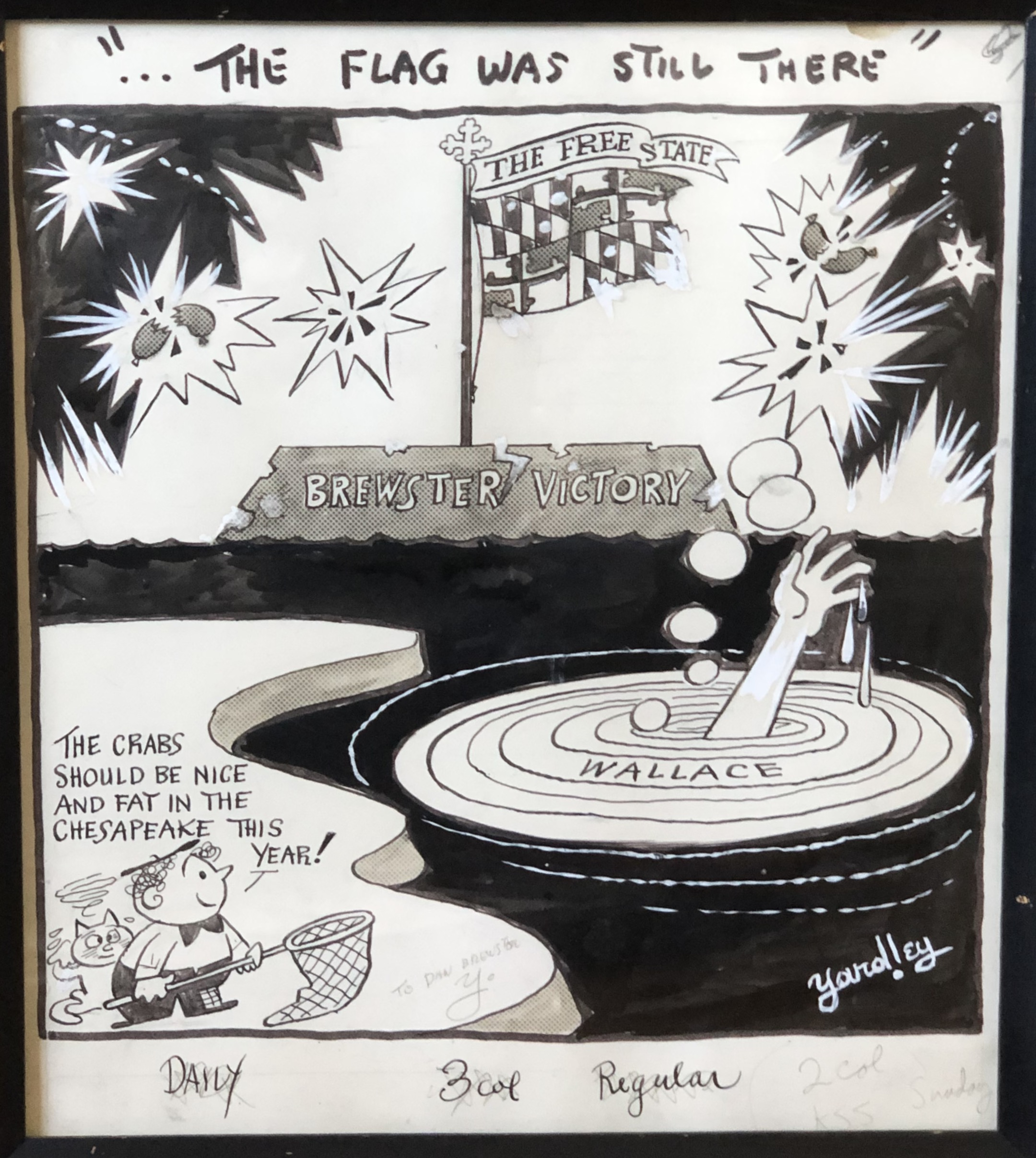
A political cartoon by Richard Yardley celebrating Daniel Brewster’s victory over George Wallace in the Maryland primary characterizes Wallace’s defeat with Fort McHenry as the backdrop.

== Results ==
1964 United States presidential election in Maryland
Party	Candidate	Running mate	Votes	Percentage	Electoral votes
Democratic	Lyndon B. Johnson	Hubert Humphrey	730,912	65.47%	10
Republican	Barry Goldwater	William E. Miller	385,495	34.53%	0

=== Results by county ===
County	Lyndon B. Johnson Democratic		Barry Goldwater Republican		Margin		Total votes cast
County	#	%	#	%	#	%	Total votes cast
Allegany	20,425	62.25%	12,384	37.75%	8,041	24.50%	32,809
Anne Arundel	37,981	58.70%	26,725	41.30%	11,256	17.40%	64,706
Baltimore	117,153	60.07%	77,870	39.93%	39,283	20.14%	195,073
Baltimore City	240,716	75.98%	76,089	24.02%	164,627	51.96%	316,805
Calvert	3,335	65.39%	1,765	34.61%	1,570	30.78%	5,100
Caroline	3,710	57.91%	2,696	42.09%	1,014	15.82%	6,406
Carroll	8,451	50.35%	8,332	49.65%	119	0.70%	16,783
Cecil	7,854	59.57%	5,330	40.43%	2,524	19.14%	13,184
Charles	6,546	65.45%	3,455	34.55%	3,091	30.90%	10,001
Dorchester	4,564	46.14%	5,327	53.86%	-763	-7.72%	9,891
Frederick	14,548	61.10%	9,264	38.90%	5,284	22.20%	23,812
Garrett	3,515	49.24%	3,624	50.76%	-109	-1.52%	7,139
Harford	13,550	57.62%	9,968	42.38%	3,582	15.24%	23,518
Howard	8,185	54.50%	6,833	45.50%	1,352	9.00%	15,018
Kent	4,113	67.19%	2,008	32.81%	2,105	34.38%	6,121
Montgomery	103,113	66.24%	52,554	33.76%	50,559	32.48%	155,667
Prince George's	81,806	63.80%	46,413	36.20%	35,393	27.60%	128,219
Queen Anne's	4,052	67.45%	1,955	32.55%	2,097	34.90%	6,007
Somerset	4,527	58.93%	3,155	41.07%	1,372	17.86%	7,682
St. Mary's	5,831	66.95%	2,878	33.05%	2,953	33.90%	8,709
Talbot	4,671	55.85%	3,693	44.15%	978	11.70%	8,364
Washington	19,858	60.89%	12,756	39.11%	7,102	21.78%	32,614
Wicomico	8,695	53.86%	7,448	46.14%	1,247	7.72%	16,143
Worcester	3,713	55.53%	2,973	44.47%	740	11.06%	6,686
Totals	730,912	65.47%	385,495	34.53%	345,417	30.94%	1,116,457

==== Counties that flipped from Democratic to Republican ====
- Dorchester

==== Counties that flipped from Republican to Democratic ====
- Alleghany
- Anne Arundel
- Baltimore
- Caroline
- Carroll
- Cecil
- Frederick
- Harford
- Howard
- Kent
- Somerset
- Talbot
- Washington
- Wicomico
- Worcester

== Works cited ==
- Black, Earl; Black, Merle (1992). The Vital South: How Presidents Are Elected. Harvard University Press. ISBN 0674941306.
