= Colonel Richardson High School =

Public school in Federalsburg, Maryland, United States

Location
- Federalsburg, Maryland; United States; 38°45′17″N 75°49′42″W

Information
- Type: Public Secondary
- Established: 1962
- School district: Caroline County Public Schools
- Principal: Jared Sherman
- Grades: 9–12
- Enrollment: 528
- Campus: Rural
- Colors: Black and White with adopted Red
- Mascot: Griffin (officially); Colonels (current usage)
- Website: CRHS Official Website

Colonel Richardson High School is located outside of Federalsburg, Maryland, United States, and is part of the Caroline County Public Schools system. As of 2021, the school serves approximately 526 students in grades nine to twelve. Students generally live in the southern end of Caroline County in Federalsburg, Preston, and a number of smaller towns. Colonel Richardson Middle School serves as the feeder school.

== History ==
In 1962, the Colonel Richardson High School was established. It consolidated two area high schools, Federalsburg High School and Preston High School.

The school was named after William Richardson, a Revolutionary War officer and state district court judge.

== Administration ==
The principal of Colonel Richardson High School is Jared Sherman.

== Academics ==
Students at Colonel Richardson High School participate in courses in accordance with the Caroline County Public Schools High School Program of Study. To earn a high school diploma, students must earn four English credits, four math credits, three science credits, three social studies credits, a financial literacy credit, a fine art credit, a technology education credit, a physical education credit, a health credit, and other credits as defined by their chosen career majors.

Available career majors include:

- Computer-Aided Drafting and Design
- Construction Technology
- Criminal Justice and Homeland Security
- Advanced Manufacturing Program
- Cosmetology
- Food & Beverage Management
- Agricultural Sciences
- Biomedical Sciences (Project Lead the Way)
- Academy of Health Professions
- Teacher Academy of Maryland
- Firefighter and Emergency Medical Responder
- Computer Science
- Engineering (Project Lead the Way)
- Automotive Technician
- Liberal Arts
- Military Service

Select programs are completed at the Caroline Career and Technology Center in Denton, MD as well as the Chesapeake Culinary Center in Denton, MD (Food & Beverage Management), the Maryland Fire and Rescue Institute in Centreville, MD (Firefighter and Emergency Medical Responder), and Easton High School in Easton, MD (Military Service).

== Athletics ==
Students at CRHS can participate in the following sports:

- Football
- Cheerleading
- Golf
- Boys' Soccer
- Girls' Soccer
- Volleyball
- Boys' Basketball
- Girls' Basketball
- Wrestling
- Tennis
- Baseball - State Champions 2007 and 2019
- Softball - State Champions 1993 and 1996
- Track and Field

== Demographics ==
- White: 66%
- Black: 24%
- Hispanic: 5%
- Two or More Races: 5%
- Asian/Pacific Islander: <.5%
- American Indian/Alaskan Native: <.5%

As of 2017, 55% of students are eligible for the free or reduced lunch program.

== Notable alumni ==
- William Oswald Mills (Federalsburg High School, 1941), U.S. Representative
- Jean Patchett (Preston High School, 1941), fashion model
- Marvin H. Smith (Federalsburg High School, 1933), judge of the Maryland Court of Appeals
- Nick Woodward, racing driver
