= Whiteleysburg, Maryland =

Unincorporated community in Maryland, U.S.

Coordinates: 38°57′24″N 75°43′57″W

Whiteleysburg is an unincorporated community in Caroline County, Maryland, United States.

== See also ==
- Whiteleysburg, Delaware
