= Tanyard Branch (Yahoola Creek tributary) =

Stream in Lumpkin County, Georgia, U.S.

Coordinates: 34°31′49.34″N 83°57′41.67″W

Tanyard Branch is a stream in Lumpkin County, with in the U.S. state of Georgia. It is a tributary to Yahoola Creek.

Tanyard Branch was so named because of a tanyard which once operated near its course.
