= Tanyard Creek (Echeconnee Creek tributary) =

Stream in Georgia, U.S.

Coordinates: 32°52′0.49″N 84°0′15.68″W

Tanyard Creek is a stream in the U.S. state of Georgia. It is a tributary to Echeconnee Creek.

It is unknown why the name "Tanyard Creek" was applied to this stream.
