= Caroline County Courthouse (Maryland) =

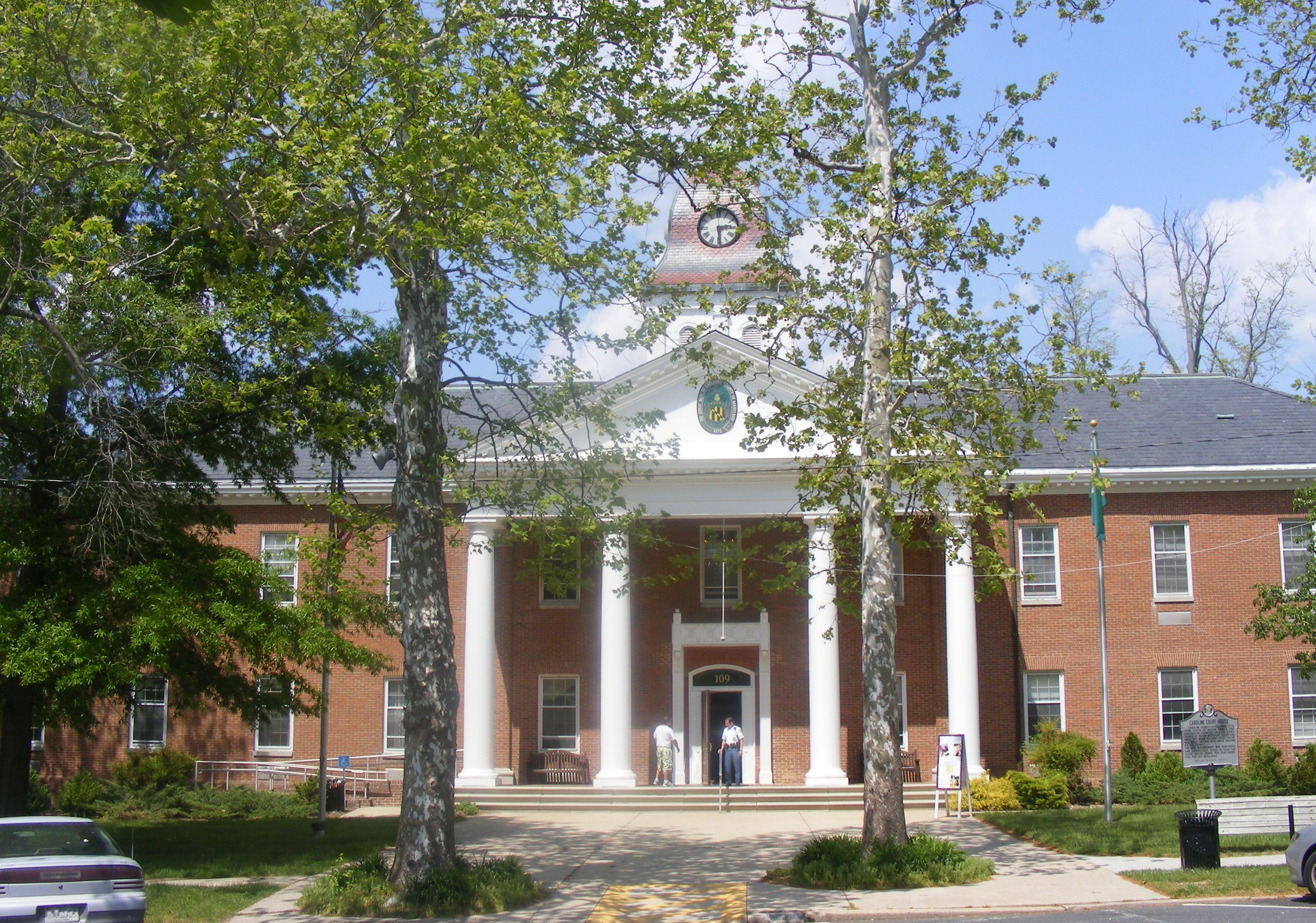
- Interactive map of the Caroline County Courthouse area

General information
- Architectural style: the late Victorian era
- Location: 109 Market Street, Denton, Maryland, United States of America
- Coordinates: 38.887°N 75.833°W
- Completed: 1895
- Cost: $21,000.00
- Client: Caroline County, Maryland

Technical details
- Size: 3 floors

Design and construction
- Architect: Joseph H. Bernard
- Engineer: Slemmons and Lankford of Salisbury, Maryland

The Caroline County Courthouse is located at 109 Market Street in Denton, Maryland. The courthouse houses the chambers and courtrooms for the judge of the Circuit Court for Caroline County, as well as the clerk's offices, jurors' assembly room, the Office of the State's Attorney for Caroline County, the Register of Wills and the master's office.

== History ==
After Caroline County, Maryland, was established in 1773, it held its early courts at seven different locations until 1797 when its first courthouse was built on the same site where the current courthouse now stands, an area once known as Pig Point. The courthouse green was purchased in 1791 for 121 shillings. The building served the County for one hundred years and there were many changes during this period.

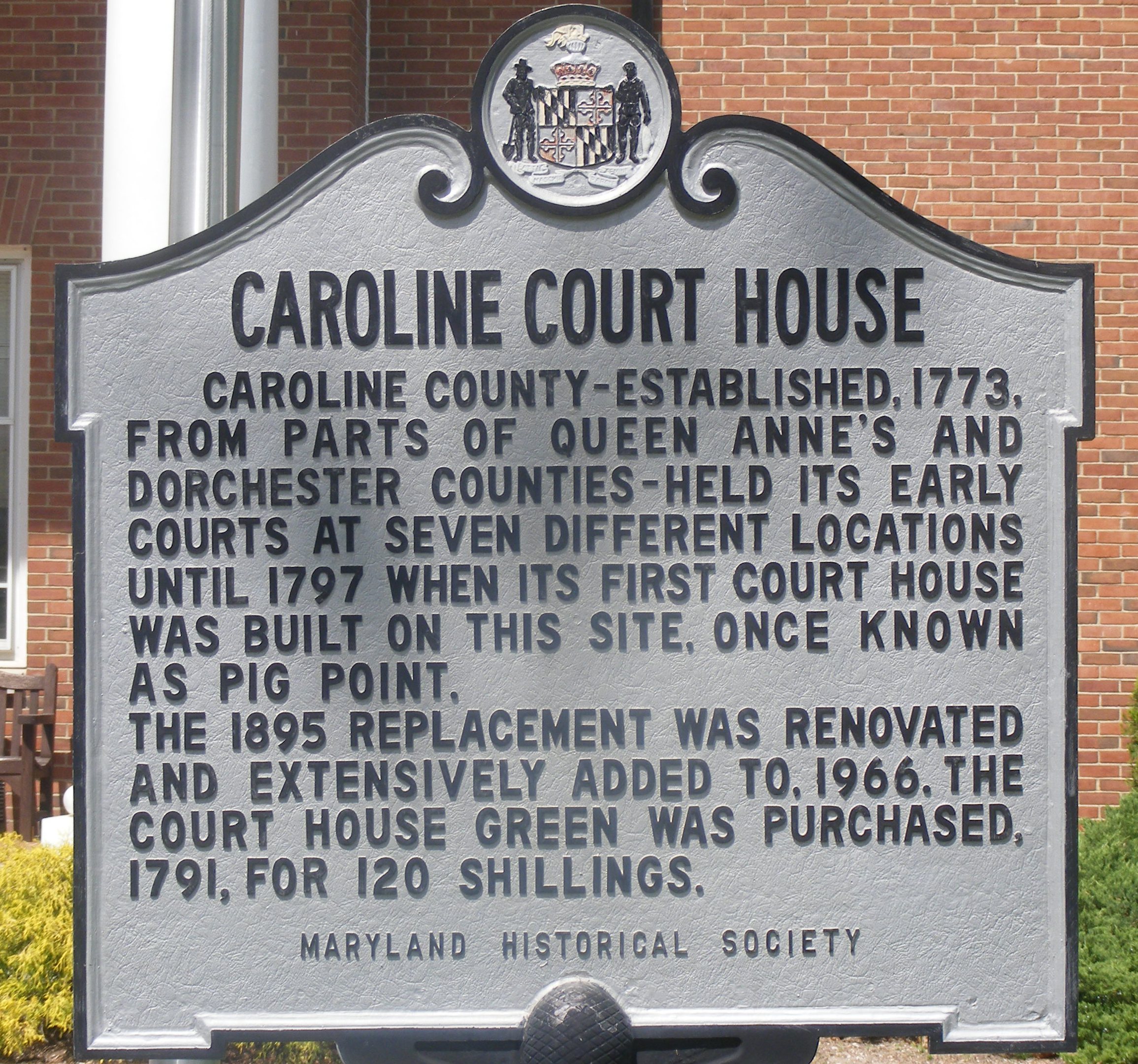

Even with the changes, vaults that stored records were overflowing and in 1894, the Caroline County commissioners asked for and received authority to raze the old courthouse and build a new one. The current courthouse was built in 1895 at the cost of $21,000 and was extensively renovated in 1966.

Franklin Delano Roosevelt came to Caroline County in 1938. He spoke in front of the courthouse in Denton on Labor Day. The speech was broadcast on radio to the rest of the country. Roosevelt was there to support his New Deal programs and also to win votes for David John Lewis. Lewis would lose the election to Millard Tydings.
