= Tanyard, Maryland =

Unincorporated community in Maryland, U.S.

Coordinates: 38°45′02″N 75°58′36″W

Tanyard is an unincorporated community in Caroline County, Maryland, United States.

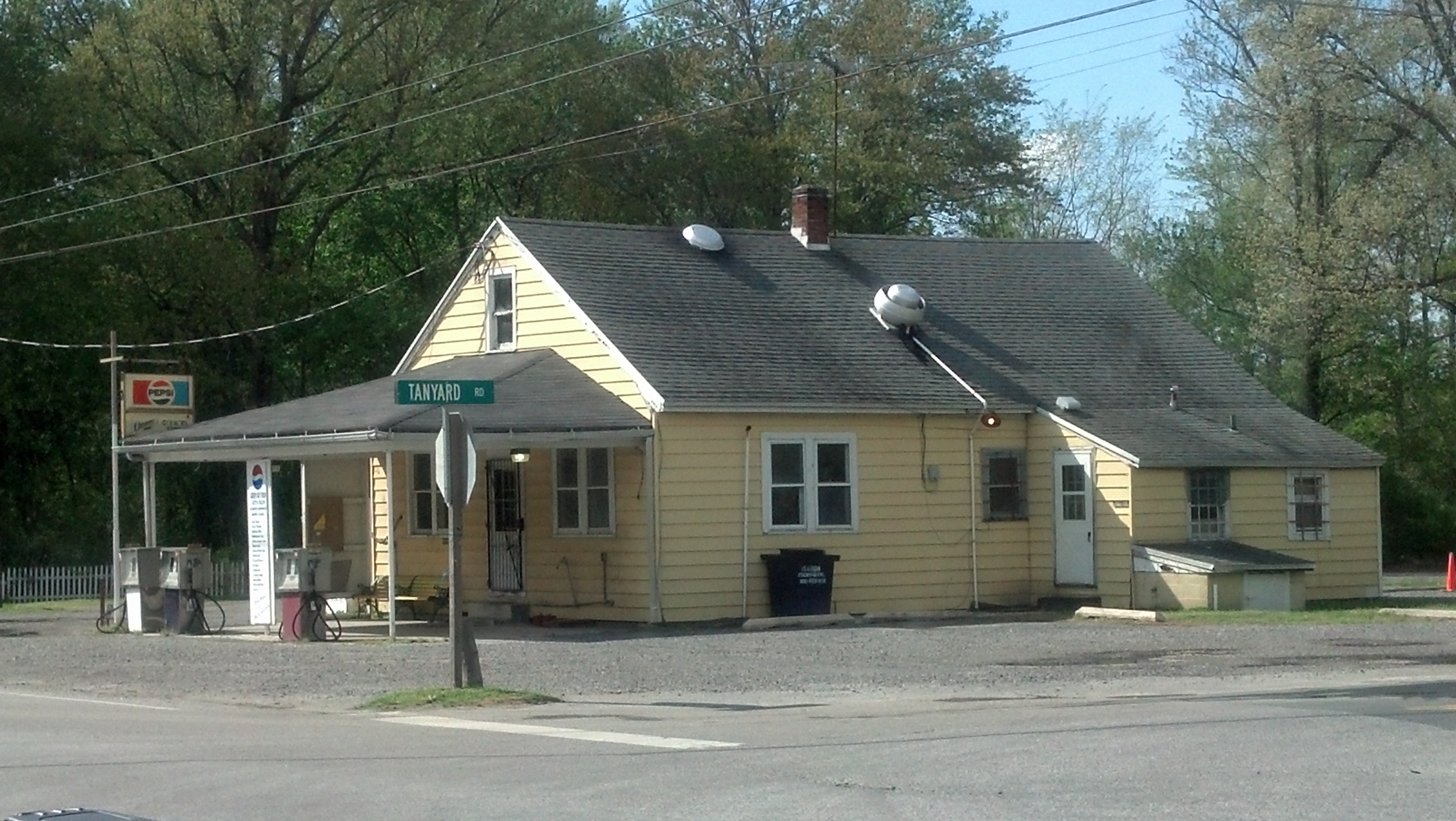
Tanyard, Maryland

== History ==
As far back as 1900, Tanyard was an established post village.

== Geography ==
Tanyard is located one mile south of Dover Bridge, which crosses the Choptank River and crossroad with Frazier Neck Road.
