= USS LST-16 =

1942 LST-1-class tank landing ship

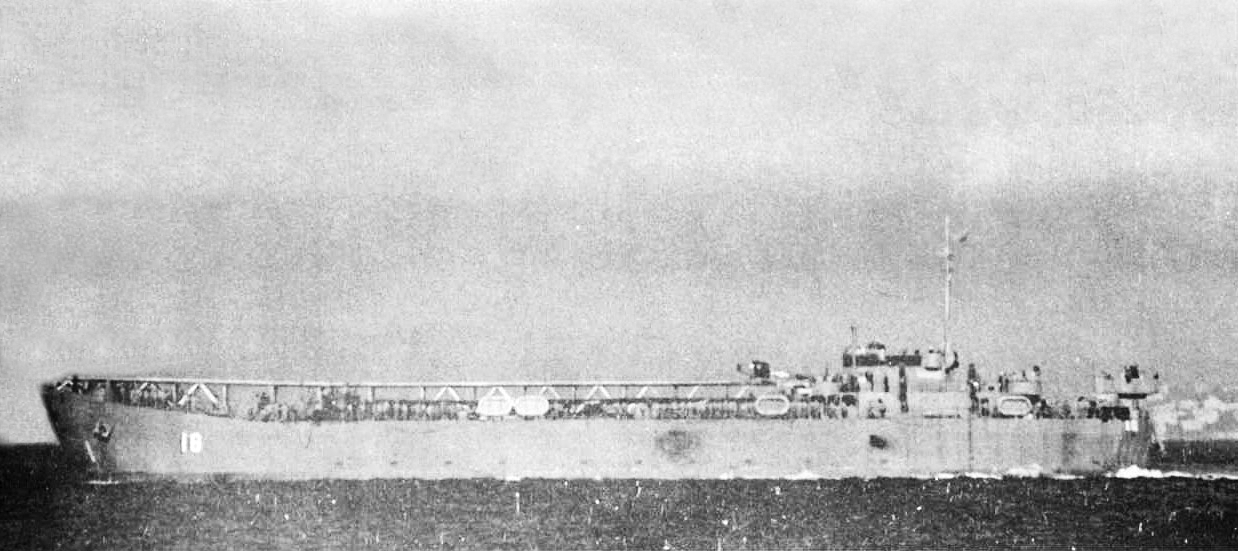
- USS LST-16 with aircraft launching platform underway c. 1943

History

United States
- Name: LST-16
- Builder: Dravo Corp.; Wilmington, Delaware
- Laid down: 1 September 1942
- Launched: 19 December 1942
- Sponsored by: Mrs. Lois M. Alexander
- Commissioned: 17 March 1943
- Decommissioned: 8 March 1946
- Stricken: 12 April 1946
- Honors and awards: 5 battle stars, World War II
- Fate: Sold for scrap, 5 December 1947

General characteristics
- Class & type: LST-1-class tank landing ship
- Displacement: 1,625 tons (light); 4,080 tons (sea-going, with 1,675-ton load)
- Length: 328 ft (100.0 m)
- Beam: 50 ft (15.2 m)
- Draft: 2 ft 4 in (0.71 m) fwd; 7 ft 6 in (2.29 m) aft (light); 8 feet 3 inches (2.51 m) fwd; 14 feet 4 inches (4.37 m) aft (sea-going); 3 feet 11 inches (1.19 m) fwd; 9 feet 10 inches (3.00 m) aft (landing, with 500-ton load)
- Propulsion: 2 × General Motors 12-567A 900 hp diesel engines; 2 × shafts; twin rudders
- Speed: 12 knots (22 km/h) (maximum)
- Endurance: 24,000 miles @ 9 knots while displacing 3960 tons; (44,000 km @ 17 km/h)
- Boats & landing craft carried: 2 × LCVPs
- Capacity: varied with mission; payloads between 1,600 and 1,900 tons
- Troops: 16 officers, 147 enlisted
- Complement: 7 officers, 104 enlisted
- Armament: 1 × 3"/50 caliber gun; 5 × 40 mm AA guns; 6 × 20 mm AA guns; 2 × .50" machine guns; 4 × .30" machine guns
- Aircraft carried: 2 × L-4B "Grasshopper"
- Aviation facilities: Custom-built mesh airstrip

USS LST-16 was a LST-1-class tank landing ship built for the U.S. Navy during World War II. Like most ships in her class, she was not named and was known only by her designation. She was staffed by a U.S. Coast Guard crew throughout her service career.

== Operational history ==
LST-16 was laid down on 1 September 1942, at Wilmington, Delaware, by the Dravo Corp.; launched on 19 December 1942; sponsored by Mrs. Lois M. Alexander; and commissioned on 17 March 1943.

Assigned to Flotilla 18, Group 53, Division 105, for Operation Husky, the invasion of Sicily, the Coast Guard-crewed LST-16 departed Tunis on 8 July 1943, and arrived at Transport Area 1, Woods Hole Beach on 10 July 1943, carrying LCT-336. While engaged in unloading operations, the LST-16 discovered that an enemy shore battery, four miles (6.4 km) away, had her range. The battery was located and the 3"/50 caliber shells fired at a range of 8,700 yards (8,000 m) were apparently hits. The LST ceased firing as a U.S. destroyer opened fire on the same target, putting it out of action. Crew members on LST-16 observed small arms fire on the beach with Allied troops and the enemy separated by small ridges 6 or 8 feet (2.4 m) high about 100 feet (30 m) from the water line.

Ordered to proceed to Bailey's Beach four miles (6.4 km) south of Scoglitti she discharged DUKWs before beaching. Both ramp chains parted while discharging DUKWs and a jury rig of wire pennants was installed. The Beachmaster advised that no pontoons were available. The vessel was beached on 11 July and the commanding officer went ashore to arrange for a causeway. While awaiting the causeway, then in use by another LST, several enemy aircraft attempted to attack the beach and the LST-16 opened fire.

At 17:00, the causeway was received and all vehicles and Army were off by 19:00. The ship's company unloaded 470 tons of supplies by hand, completing the task by 14:00 on 12 July. At 17:00 she proceeded to a newly marked beach north of Scoglitti and on 13 July loaded 300 tons of ammunition and supplies from Anne Arundel (AP-76) and proceeded to anchorage. Gunners aboard LST-16 fired on enemy aircraft at 21:50 on 14 July, and the ship began discharging ammunition and supplies via DUKWs. On 15 July the LST was underway, anchoring in Tunis Bay the next day.

LST-16 returned to Gela, Sicily, on 19 July 1943, with 7 officers and 142 enlisted men of the U.S. Army and returned to Tunis Bay with 62 Italian officers and 408 Italian soldiers as prisoners of war on 22 July 1943. Again loading 35 vehicles, 2 officers end 44 enlisted men of the U.S. Army the LST anchored off Gela on 24 July and was back in Tunis Bay the next day. On 28 July 1943, she made her final trip to Gela with 13 officers, 153 enlisted men and 63 vehicles. She returned to Biserte on 14 August 1943, towing two sections of pontoon causeways in tandem. In 14 trips and one shuttle trip, 48 officers, 537 enlisted men, 894 tons of cargo and 167 vehicles were transported to Sicily. Thirty-six U. S. military personnel and 471 prisoners of war were returned to North Africa.

While in the Mediterranean, Seabees converted LST-16 into a makeshift aircraft carrier sporting a custom-built mesh airstrip above deck. She was the base for two USAAF L-4B Grasshoppers. Missions flown were typically as artillery spotters. LST-16 was one of six LSTs so converted.

LST-16 participated in the Salerno landings in September 1943, and advanced landings at Anzio-Nettuno in January and February 1944.

On 31 March 1944, LST-16 departed Naples for Plymouth, England, via Oran, to make preparations for the invasion of the coast of France. She arrived at Plymouth 25 April 1944. On 2 June 1944 she began to take on board 34 officers, 486 enlisted men, and 79 vehicles of the U.S. Army and she also carried two barrage balloons. On 5 June 1944 she was anchored in the mouth of the Helford River awaiting the order to set sail for Normandy. By this time she was equipped to evacuate and care for casualties, including bringing aboard, in addition to the ship's crew, two doctors and 20 enlisted personnel to care for the casualties. She got underway at 08:23 to join Convoy B-3 from Falmouth en route to Omaha Beach.

She anchored five miles (8.0 km) off the coast of Normandy at 10:10 on 7 June 1944. She continually shifted anchorage closer to shore that day, observing some close shell-fire from enemy batteries ashore. One shell landed only 100 yards off the starboard bow. At 21:55 that same day she anchored one mile (1.6 km) off shore and opened her bow doors and lowered her landing ramp. She then commenced unloading some of the Army personnel into small boats for transport to Omaha Beach. She closed her bow doors at 00:05 on 8 July 1944. At 01:02 hours she launched her LCVP #1 to pick up casualties on the beach for return to LST-16, but it struck a mine en route and sank, killing one of the crew and injuring another. She attempted to beach herself unsuccessfully at 09:18 on 8 June 1944. At 10:32 that same day the local control vessel ordered her to beach on Omaha Beach at 14:00. Until that time she unloaded 150 Army personnel into LCI-554 for transport to the beach.

At 13:30 on 8 June 1944, she beached at the western-end of Omaha Beach, dropping her bow and stern anchors as she came to a stop. She then opened her bow doors and lowered the landing ramp and commenced unloading the remaining troops and equipment beginning at 16:00. By 18:00 all of the Army personnel, their equipment, vehicles and the two barrage balloons were safely ashore. She took aboard five casualties and 17 survivors of LCT-650 and retracted from the beach. She joined a convoy on 9 June that was making its way back to England and arrived at Solent at 22:05 on 9 June 1944. She continued making cross-Channel trips, carrying supplies and reinforcements from England to Normandy and returning with casualties. LST-16 was ordered on 25 September 1944, to return to the United States. She did not actually leave Plymouth until 26 January 1945, and after arriving at Norfolk on 17 February 1945, proceeded to Davisville, Rhode Island, to unload.

LST-16 proceeded to Galveston, Texas via Boston and New Orleans for an availability from 11 March to 17 April 1945. Returning to New Orleans she proceeded on 27 April 1945, via Theodore, Mobile, Canal Zone, Pearl Harbor, Eniwetok, Saipan, Leyte, Luzon and Batangas to Tokyo, where she arrived 15 September 1945. During the journey, the ship welcomed a new commanding officer, Lt. (jg) W. J. Kenneally, USCGR, on 22 May 1945.

The veteran landing craft remained in Tokyo for more than two months and on 28 November 1945, she arrived at Saipan on her homeward voyage, which included stops at Pearl Harbor, San Francisco and the Canal Zone before Charleston was reached 20 February 1946.

She was decommissioned and her Coast Guard crew removed on 8 March 1946. She was struck from the Navy List on 12 April 1946. On 5 December 1947, she was sold to Ships and Power Equipment Co., of Barber, New Jersey, for scrapping.

LST-16 earned five battle stars for World War II service.
