= USS Caroline County =

Former United States naval vessel

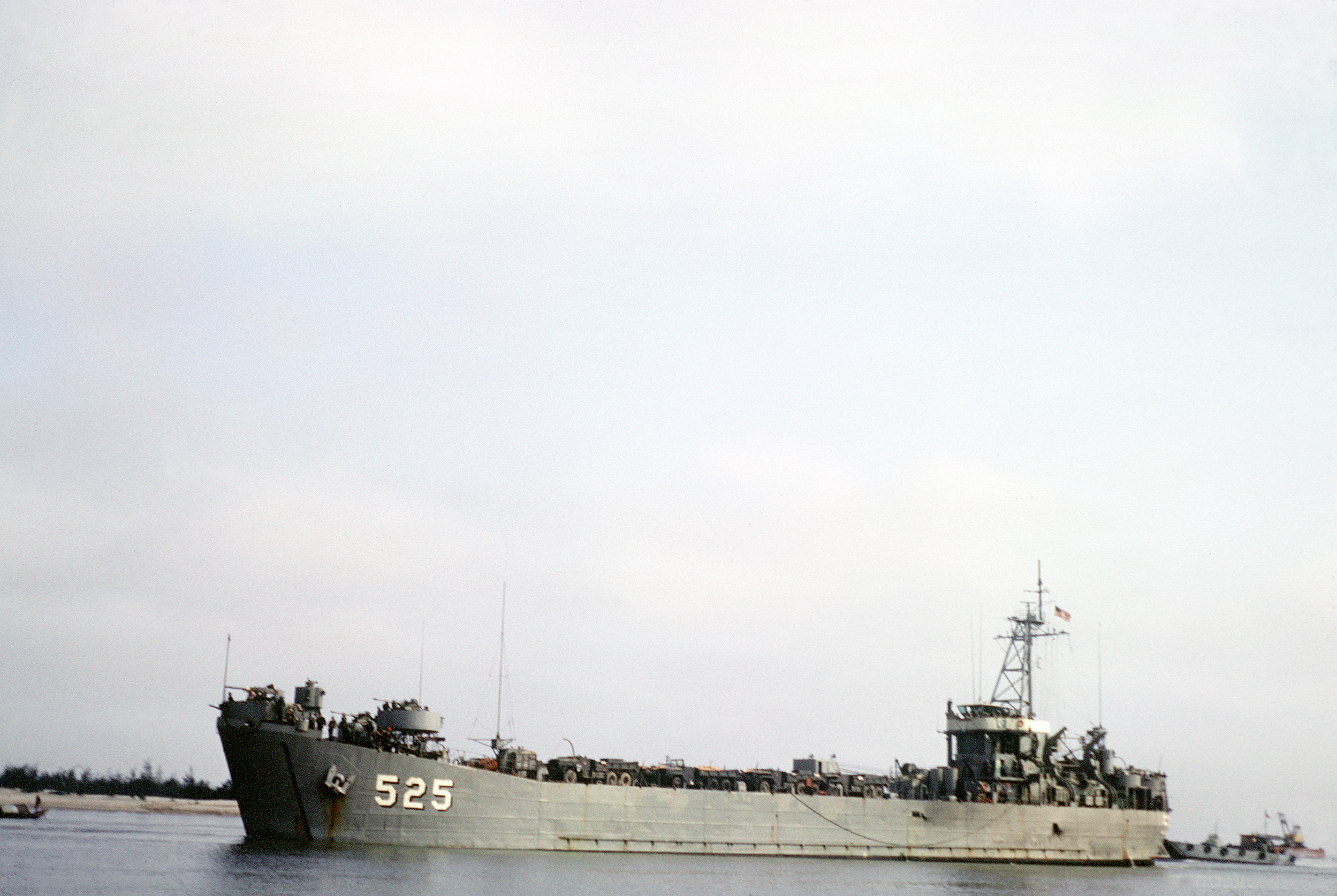
- USS Caroline County (LST-525) in 1967

History

United States
- Name: USS LST-525, later USS Caroline County
- Namesake: Caroline County, Maryland, and Caroline County, Virginia
- Builder: Jeffersonville Boat and Machine Company, Jeffersonville, Indiana
- Laid down: 18 October 1943
- Launched: 20 December 1943
- Commissioned: 14 February 1944
- Decommissioned: 25 June 1946
- Recommissioned: October 1950
- Decommissioned: 15 September 1954
- Renamed: USS Caroline County (LST-525), 1 July 1955
- Recommissioned: mid-1965
- Decommissioned: Early 1970
- Stricken: 15 September 1974
- Honours and awards: 2 battle stars (World War II); 4 battle stars (Vietnam)
- Fate: Sold for scrapping 1975

General characteristics
- Class & type: LST-491-class tank landing ship
- Displacement: 1,780 long tons (1,809 t) light; 3,640 long tons (3,698 t) full
- Length: 328 ft (100 m)
- Beam: 50 ft (15 m)
- Draft: Unloaded : 2 ft 4 in (0.71 m) forward; 7 ft 6 in (2.29 m) aft; Loaded : 8 ft 2 in (2.49 m) forward; 14 ft 1 in (4.29 m) aft
- Propulsion: 2 × General Motors 12-567 diesel engines, two shafts, twin rudders
- Speed: 12 knots (22 km/h; 14 mph)
- Boats & landing craft carried: 2 LCVPs
- Troops: Approximately 130 officers and enlisted men
- Complement: 8–10 officers, 89–100 enlisted men
- Armament: 1 × single 3-inch/50-caliber gun mount; 8 × 40 mm guns; 12 × 20 mm guns

USS Caroline County (LST-525) was an LST-491-class tank landing ship built for the United States Navy during World War II. Named for counties in Maryland and Virginia, she was the only U.S. Naval vessel to bear the name.

LST-525 was laid down on 18 October 1943 at Jeffersonville, Indiana by the Jeffersonville Boat & Machine Company; launched on 20 December 1943; sponsored by Mrs. Anna Mae Federspiel; and commissioned on 14 February 1944.

== Service history ==
During World War II, LST-525 was assigned to the European Theater and participated in the following operations: Convoy UGS-36 (April 1944) and the invasion of southern France (August and September 1944). Following the war, LST-525 was decommissioned on 25 June 1946.

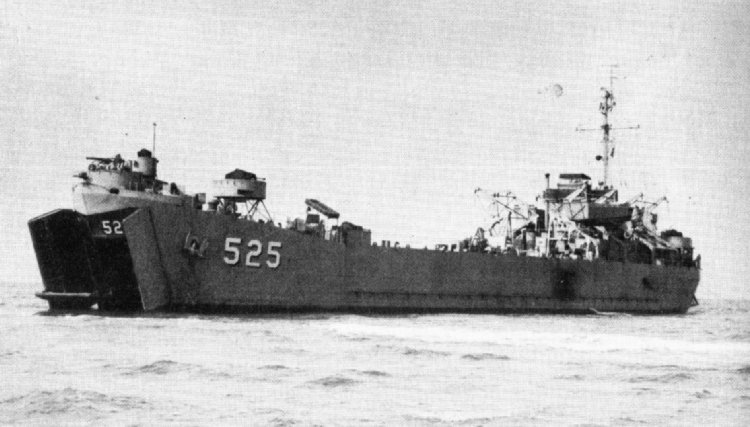
USS Caroline County (LST-525)

She was recommissioned in October, 1950 and performed services for the Amphibious Force, U.S. Atlantic Fleet, until decommissioned on 15 September 1954. On 1 July 1955 she was named USS Caroline County (LST-525).

Again reactivated in mid-1965, Caroline County provided support and resupply for riverine forces in Vietnam in 1967 and 1968. Decommissioned in early 1970 at Orange, Texas she was struck from the Naval Vessel Register on 15 September 1974. Caroline County was sold for scrapping by the Defense Reutilization and Marketing Service (DRMS) 1 August 1975.

Caroline County earned two battle stars for World War II service as LST-525 and four battle stars for Vietnam War service.

== See also ==
- List of United States Navy LSTs
- Caroline County, Maryland
- Caroline County, Virginia
