= Caroline County, Maryland =

County in Maryland, United States

- County
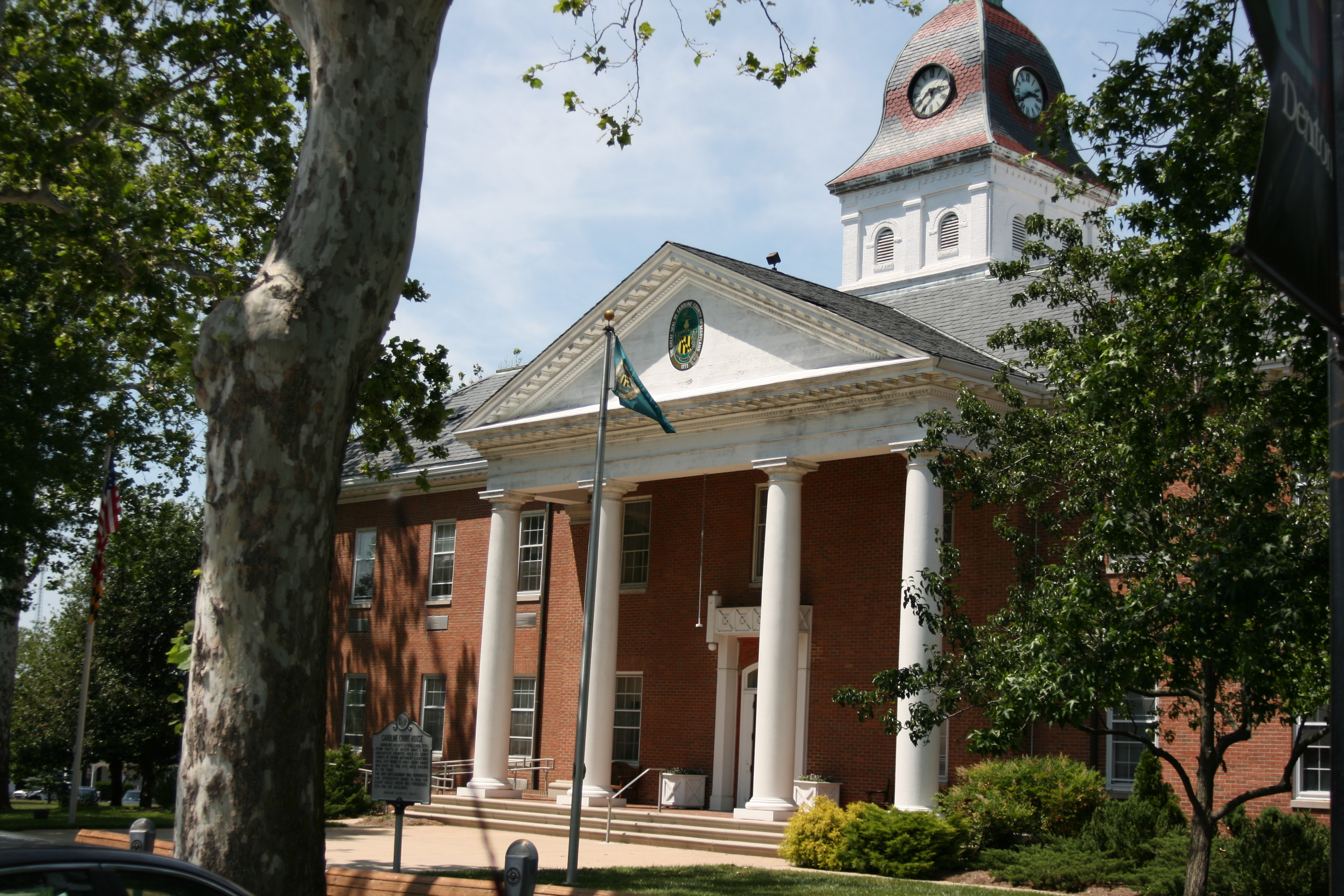
- The Caroline County Courthouse in July 2012

- Flag Seal

- Location within the U.S. state of Maryland
- Coordinates: 38°52′00″N 75°49′00″W
- Country: United States
- State: Maryland
- Founded: 1774
- Named for: Caroline Eden
- Seat: Denton
- Largest town: Denton

Area
  - Total: 326 sq mi (840 km^{2})
  - Land: 319 sq mi (830 km^{2})
  - Water: 6.5 sq mi (17 km^{2}) 2.0%

Population (2020)
  - Total: 33,293
  - Estimate (2025): 34,116 ▲
  - Density: 104/sq mi (40.3/km^{2})
- Time zone: UTC−5 (Eastern)
  - Summer (DST): UTC−4 (EDT)
- Congressional district: 1st
- Website: www.carolinemd.org

Caroline County is a rural county located in the U.S. state of Maryland. As of the 2020 United States census, the population was 33,293. Its county seat is Denton. The county is part of the Mid-Eastern Shore region of the state.

Caroline County is bordered by Queen Anne's County to the north, Talbot County to the west, Dorchester County to the south, Kent County, Delaware, to the east, and Sussex County, Delaware, to the southeast.

== History ==
Caroline County was created via 1773 Maryland General Assembly legislation from parts of Dorchester and Queen Anne's counties. The county derives its name from Lady Caroline Eden, wife of Maryland's last colonial governor, Robert Eden. Seven commissioners were originally appointed: Charles Dickinson, Benson Stainton, Thomas White, William Haskins, Richard Mason, Joshua Clark, and Nathaniel Potter. These men bought 4 acres (1.6 ha) of land at Pig Point (now Denton) on which to build a courthouse and jail.

Until the completion of these buildings, court was held at Melvill's Warehouse, approximately 1.5 miles (2.4 km) north of Pig Point. Elections and other business transactions were completed there. The first commissioner meeting was held on March 15, 1774, at Melvill's Warehouse. In 1777, court was moved to Bridgetown (now Greensboro), but in the interest of convenience, court was moved back to Melvill's.

Disagreements arose concerning the permanent location of the county seat. The General Assembly reached a compromise in 1785 and ordered that 2 acres (0.81 ha) of land at Melvill's Landing should be purchased for a courthouse and jail. In 1790, the county court and its belongings moved to Pig Point. The Caroline County Courthouse was completed in 1797.

The county has a number of properties on the National Register of Historic Places. The National Park Service is developing a site in the southern half of Caroline County dedicated to interpreting the Underground Railroad as part of the Harriet Tubman Underground Railroad National Monument.

== Government ==
Caroline County was granted home rule in 1984 under state code in an initiative led by County Commissioner Charles T. Dean, Sr.

- The County Commissioners as of 2022 are:
  - Frank Bartz - Republican
  - J. Travis Breeding - Republican
  - Larry C. Porter - Republican
- County Administrator: Jeremy Goldman
- Executive Assistant to the County Commissioners: Kaleigh Leager

Growth is a major issue faced by Caroline County and several other Mid-Shore counties. Retirees and workers willing to commute across the Chesapeake Bay to the western shore are increasingly attracted by the rural environment and low cost of living.

From 1994 to 2014 Caroline was the only county in the state not represented by a resident legislator in the Maryland General Assembly. Redistricting and a sparse population were the chief causes.

=== Law enforcement ===
The Sheriff of Caroline County is Donnie Baker, who has held the position since 2022.

== Politics ==
United States presidential election results for Caroline County, Maryland
Year	Republican		Democratic		Third party(ies)	
Year	No.	%	No.	%	No.	%
1900	1,796	48.27%	1,774	47.68%	151	4.06%
1904	1,452	43.09%	1,809	53.68%	109	3.23%
1908	1,584	43.65%	1,915	52.77%	130	3.58%
1912	1,445	39.64%	1,882	51.63%	318	8.72%
1916	1,666	44.88%	1,965	52.94%	81	2.18%
1920	2,929	48.90%	3,012	50.28%	49	0.82%
1924	2,210	45.21%	2,493	51.00%	185	3.78%
1928	3,270	61.44%	2,030	38.14%	22	0.41%
1932	1,998	35.23%	3,651	64.38%	22	0.39%
1936	2,611	42.07%	3,579	57.67%	16	0.26%
1940	3,087	48.23%	3,284	51.30%	30	0.47%
1944	3,073	59.87%	2,060	40.13%	0	0.00%
1948	2,746	52.73%	2,430	46.66%	32	0.61%
1952	4,155	60.23%	2,733	39.61%	11	0.16%
1956	4,208	60.90%	2,702	39.10%	0	0.00%
1960	3,698	52.24%	3,381	47.76%	0	0.00%
1964	2,696	42.09%	3,710	57.91%	0	0.00%
1968	3,120	50.07%	1,697	27.23%	1,414	22.69%
1972	4,325	72.71%	1,567	26.34%	56	0.94%
1976	3,114	50.79%	3,017	49.21%	0	0.00%
1980	3,582	52.95%	2,833	41.88%	350	5.17%
1984	4,876	68.69%	2,198	30.96%	25	0.35%
1988	4,661	65.44%	2,440	34.26%	22	0.31%
1992	3,856	45.58%	2,822	33.36%	1,781	21.05%
1996	3,874	47.38%	3,251	39.76%	1,052	12.87%
2000	5,300	59.20%	3,396	37.94%	256	2.86%
2004	7,396	65.13%	3,810	33.55%	150	1.32%
2008	8,015	60.64%	4,971	37.61%	232	1.76%
2012	8,098	60.63%	4,970	37.21%	289	2.16%
2016	9,368	66.38%	4,009	28.41%	736	5.22%
2020	10,283	65.11%	5,095	32.26%	416	2.63%
2024	11,053	67.69%	4,860	29.76%	417	2.55%

At a Presidential level, Caroline is the “reddest” county on the mostly Republican Eastern Shore, and rivals Carroll and Cecil Counties as the most Republican counties in the state outside of Appalachian Western Maryland. No Democratic presidential candidate has carried Caroline County since Lyndon Johnson’s landslide in 1964, and before then it had last gone Democratic in 1940 with Franklin D. Roosevelt. Indeed, the last Democrat to reach forty percent of the county's vote was Jimmy Carter in 1980. In earlier times Caroline was a swing county, less secessionist than Wicomico, Worcester, Queen Anne's or Cecil.

=== Voter registration ===
Voter registration and party enrollment as of March 2024
Republican	10,702	48.61%
Democratic	6,064	27.54%
Unaffiliated	4,864	22.09%
Libertarian	125	0.57%
Other parties	261	1.19%
Total	22,016	100%

== Geography ==
According to the U.S. Census Bureau, the county has a total area of 326 square miles (840 km^{2}), of which 319 square miles (830 km^{2}) is land and 6.5 square miles (17 km^{2}) (2.0%) is water. It is the second-smallest county by total area in Maryland. Notable waterways include the Choptank River and Tuckahoe Creek, as well as the man-made Williston Lake.

Caroline County currently ranks seventh nationally in terms of land protected under the Ag Preservation Program.

Its eastern border is the Mason–Dixon line.

Caroline is the only Eastern Shore county not to touch either the Chesapeake Bay or Atlantic Ocean. Additionally, it is the only county on the Eastern Shore without an Interstate or United States Highway within its borders.

Tuckahoe State Park, Holiday Park Campgrounds and Martinak State Park are located in Caroline County.

The American Discovery Trail runs through the county.

=== Adjacent counties ===
- Kent County, Delaware (northeast)
- Sussex County, Delaware (southeast)
- Dorchester County (south)
- Talbot County (west)
- Queen Anne's County (northwest)

== Demographics ==
Historical population
Census	Pop.	Note	%±
1790	9,506		—
1800	9,226		−2.9%
1810	9,453		2.5%
1820	10,108		6.9%
1830	9,070		−10.3%
1840	7,806		−13.9%
1850	9,692		24.2%
1860	11,129		14.8%
1870	12,101		8.7%
1880	13,766		13.8%
1890	13,903		1.0%
1900	16,248		16.9%
1910	19,216		18.3%
1920	18,652		−2.9%
1930	17,387		−6.8%
1940	17,549		0.9%
1950	18,234		3.9%
1960	19,462		6.7%
1970	19,781		1.6%
1980	23,143		17.0%
1990	27,035		16.8%
2000	29,772		10.1%
2010	33,066		11.1%
2020	33,293		0.7%
2025 (est.)	34,116	▲	2.5%
U.S. Decennial Census; 1790-1960 1900-1990; 1990-2000 2010 2020

=== Racial and ethnic composition ===
Caroline County, Maryland – Racial and ethnic composition Note: the US Census treats Hispanic/Latino as an ethnic category. This table excludes Latinos from the racial categories and assigns them to a separate category. Hispanics/Latinos may be of any race.
Race / Ethnicity (NH = Non-Hispanic)	Pop 1980	Pop 1990	Pop 2000	Pop 2010	Pop 2020	% 1980	% 1990	% 2000	% 2010	% 2020
White alone (NH)	19,032	22,225	24,029	25,853	24,114	82.24%	82.21%	80.71%	78.19%	72.43%
Black or African American alone (NH)	3,866	4,435	4,368	4,520	4,368	16.70%	16.40%	14.67%	13.67%	13.12%
Native American or Alaska Native alone (NH)	26	58	84	95	67	0.11%	0.21%	0.28%	0.29%	0.20%
Asian alone (NH)	30	79	163	186	345	0.13%	0.29%	0.55%	0.56%	1.04%
Native Hawaiian or Pacific Islander alone (NH)	x	x	1	9	13	x	x	0.00%	0.03%	0.04%
Other race alone (NH)	17	7	21	32	102	0.07%	0.03%	0.07%	0.10%	0.31%
Mixed race or Multiracial (NH)	x	x	317	555	1,464	x	x	1.06%	1.68%	4.40%
Hispanic or Latino (any race)	172	231	789	1,816	2,820	0.74%	0.85%	2.65%	5.49%	8.47%
Total	23,143	27,035	29,772	33,066	33,293	100.00%	100.00%	100.00%	100.00%	100.00%

=== 2020 census ===
As of the 2020 census, the county had a population of 33,293 and a median age of 40.0 years. 23.8% of residents were under the age of 18 and 17.4% of residents were 65 years of age or older. For every 100 females there were 94.4 males, and for every 100 females age 18 and over there were 92.5 males age 18 and over. 15.0% of residents lived in urban areas, while 85.0% lived in rural areas.

The racial makeup of the county was 73.5% White, 13.3% Black or African American, 0.4% American Indian and Alaska Native, 1.1% Asian, 0.1% Native Hawaiian and Pacific Islander, 5.1% from some other race, and 6.5% from two or more races. Hispanic or Latino residents of any race comprised 8.5% of the population.

There were 12,327 households in the county, of which 33.4% had children under the age of 18 living with them and 26.2% had a female householder with no spouse or partner present. About 23.6% of all households were made up of individuals and 11.5% had someone living alone who was 65 years of age or older.

There were 13,434 housing units, of which 8.2% were vacant. Among occupied housing units, 72.5% were owner-occupied and 27.5% were renter-occupied. The homeowner vacancy rate was 1.7% and the rental vacancy rate was 6.0%.

=== 2010 census ===
As of the 2010 United States census, there were 33,066 people, 12,158 households, and 8,702 families living in the county. The population density was 103.5 inhabitants per square mile (40.0/km^{2}). There were 13,482 housing units at an average density of 42.2 per square mile (16.3/km^{2}). The racial makeup of the county was 79.8% white, 13.9% black or African American, 0.6% Asian, 0.4% American Indian, 0.2% Pacific islander, 3.1% from other races, and 2.1% from two or more races. Those of Hispanic or Latino origin made up 5.5% of the population. In terms of ancestry, 21.7% were German, 15.6% were Irish, 12.3% were English, and 6.9% were American.

Of the 12,158 households, 36.3% had children under the age of 18 living with them, 52.1% were married couples living together, 13.6% had a female householder with no husband present, 28.4% were non-families, and 22.7% of all households were made up of individuals. The average household size was 2.68 and the average family size was 3.12. The median age was 38.7 years.

The median income for a household in the county was $58,799 and the median income for a family was $65,801. Males had a median income of $45,944 versus $33,927 for females. The per capita income for the county was $24,294. About 8.0% of families and 11.5% of the population were below the poverty line, including 15.5% of those under age 18 and 11.1% of those age 65 or over.

=== 2000 census ===
As of the census of 2000, there were 29,772 people, 11,097 households, and 8,156 families living in the county. The population density was 93 people per square mile (36 people/km^{2}). There were 12,028 housing units at an average density of 38 per square mile (15/km^{2}). The racial makeup of the county was 81.69% White, 14.77% Black or African American, 0.37% Native American, 0.55% Asian, 0.02% Pacific Islander, 1.26% from other races, and 1.34% from two or more races. 2.65% of the population were Hispanic or Latino of any race. 17.4% were of American, 14.8% English, 14.4% German and 9.9% Irish ancestry.

There were 11,097 households, out of which 34.80% had children under the age of 18 living with them, 54.30% were married couples living together, 13.60% had a female householder with no husband present, and 26.50% were non-families. 21.50% of all households were made up of individuals, and 9.40% had someone living alone who was 65 years of age or older. The average household size was 2.64 and the average family size was 3.03.

In the county, the population was spread out, with 26.80% under the age of 18, 7.70% from 18 to 24, 28.90% from 25 to 44, 23.10% from 45 to 64, and 13.50% who were 65 years of age or older. The median age was 37 years. For every 100 females there were 95.90 males. For every 100 females age 18 and over, there were 91.70 males.

The median income for a household in the county was $38,832, and the median income for a family was $44,825. Males had a median income of $31,119 versus $21,915 for females. The per capita income for the county was $17,275. About 9.00% of families and 11.70% of the population were below the poverty line, including 14.50% of those under age 18 and 12.30% of those age 65 or over. It is regularly ranked among the poorest of all 23 Maryland counties.

As of Census 2010 the racial makeup of Caroline County was 78.19% Non-Hispanic white, 13.87% black, 0.37% Native American, 0.57% Asian, 0.16% Pacific Islander, 0.10% Non-Hispanics of some other race, 1.68% Non-Hispanics of two or more races and 5.49% Hispanic or Latino.

== Education ==
Caroline County Public Schools provides public education in Caroline County.

- North Caroline High School
- Colonel Richardson High School

== Media ==
The Caroline Review circulates monthly and is free of charge; a digital daily, Caroline Past and Present, was established in 2018.

== Entertainment ==
- The citizens of the towns of Hickman and Preston were once recognized by the TV show Hee Haw. In fact, the Hickman segment is the episode featured in the comedy wing of the Country Music Hall of Fame.
- Baseball Hall of Famer Jimmie Foxx began his career as a semipro catcher in Ridgely. Another Hall of Famer, Home Run Baker, played for the town team as well.
- Rocker George Thorogood played Caroline County bars while attending the University of Delaware before hitting the big time.
- The 2004 South Caroline baseball team made it to the Little League World Series in Williamsport, Pennsylvania, and placed third in the nation.
- Summerfest is held each August in Denton.
- The Caroline-Dorchester County Fair is held each August in Williston.
- The Strawberry Festival is held every Memorial Day weekend in Ridgely.

== Transportation ==
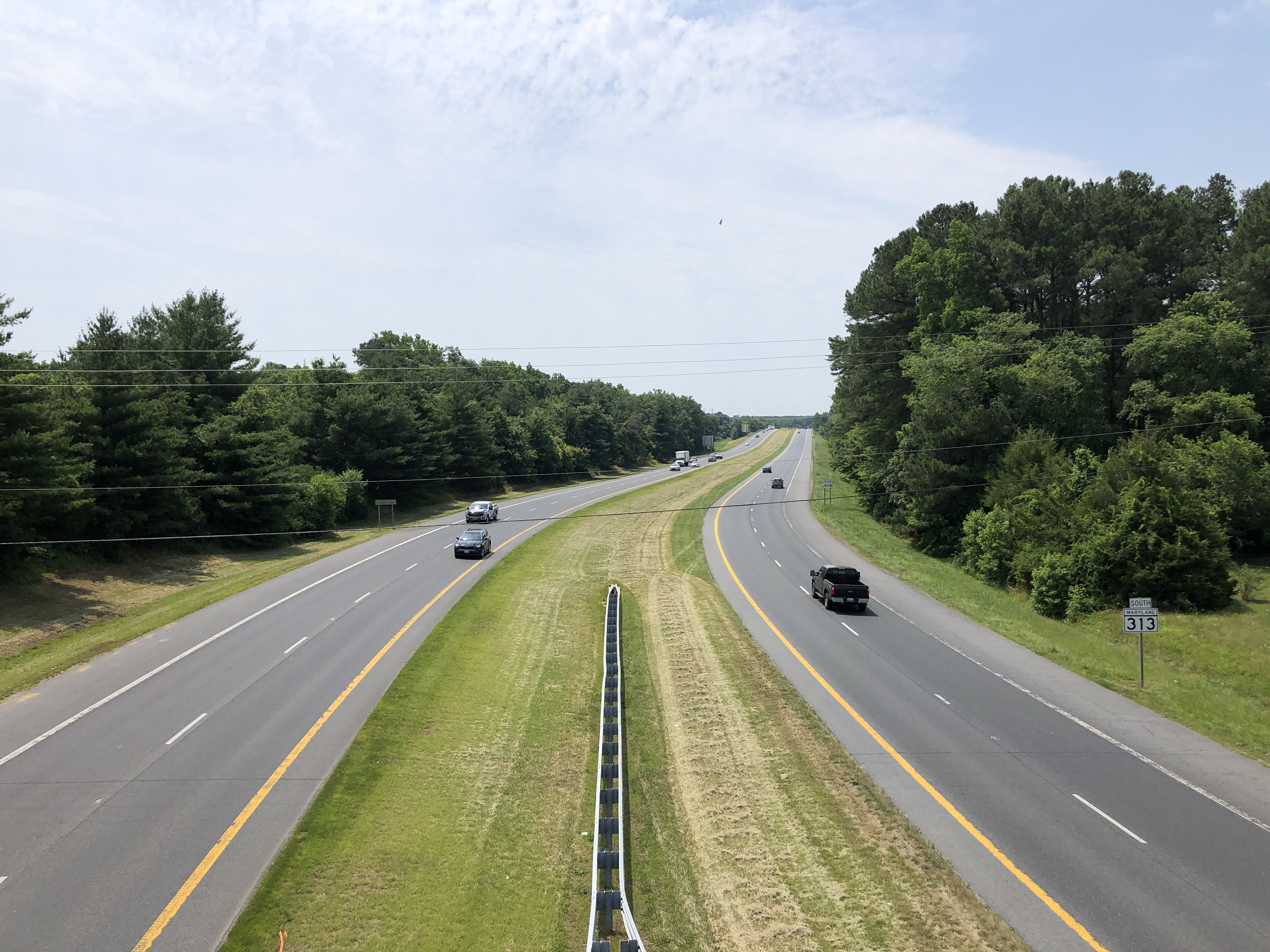
MD 313 southbound and MD 404 eastbound in Denton

Caroline County is one of three Maryland counties that does not have an Interstate or U.S. Highway running through it. Caroline's "major artery" is Maryland Route 404, four lanes in some parts but two lanes in others. It is chiefly used in the summertime by non-local beachgoers heading to Ocean City, Maryland, or Rehoboth Beach, Delaware.

- MD 16
- MD 287
- MD 302
- MD 304
- MD 306
- MD 307
- MD 308
- MD 311
- MD 312
- MD 313
- MD 314
- MD 315
- MD 317
- MD 318
- MD 328
- MD 331
- MD 404
- MD 454
- MD 480
- MD 577
- MD 578
- MD 619

== Communities ==
=== Towns ===
- Denton (county seat)
- Federalsburg
- Goldsboro
- Greensboro
- Henderson
- Hillsboro
- Marydel
- Preston
- Ridgely
- Templeville (partly in Queen Anne's County)

=== Census-designated places ===
The United States Census Bureau recognizes three Census-designated places in Caroline County:

- Choptank
- West Denton
- Williston

=== Unincorporated communities ===
- American Corner
- Andersontown
- Baltimore Corner
- Bethlehem
- Brick Wall Landing
- Burrsville
- Gilpin Point
- Harmony
- Hickman
- Hobbs
- Jumptown
- Linchester
- Oakland
- Oil City
- Tanyard
- Two Johns
- Reliance (partial)
- Whiteleysburg

== Notable people and animals ==
- James Gordon Bennett Jr., publisher, participated in a duel near Marydel in 1877.
- Buddy, U.S. President Bill Clinton's chocolate Labrador Retriever
- Charles Dickinson, killed in a duel in 1806 by future President Andrew Jackson
- Frederick Douglass, orator, social reformer, former slave
- Thomas Alan Goldsborough, noted jurist and congressman
- Harry R. Hughes, Governor of Maryland, 1979–1987
- Sophie Kerr, early 20th century author and benefactor of the largest undergraduate literary prize in the nation, at Washington College in Chestertown
- William Richardson, hero of the Battle of Harlem Heights in the Revolutionary War
- Thomas Alexander Smith, early 20th century congressman and businessman
- Sherman W. Tribbitt, Governor of Delaware, 1973–1977
- Harriet Tubman, abolitionist, humanitarian, former slave
- George A. Waggaman, US senator from Louisiana

== See also ==
- National Register of Historic Places listings in Caroline County, Maryland
- USS Caroline County (LST-525)
- Museum of Rural Life
