= Réunion pochard =

Scientific classification
- Domain: Eukaryota
- Kingdom: Animalia
- Phylum: Chordata
- Class: Aves
- Order: Anseriformes
- Family: Anatidae
- Tribe: Aythyini
- Genus: Aythya
- Species: A. sp.

Binomial name
- Aythya sp.
- Confirmed range Possible range

Synonyms
- Aythya cf. innotata

Extinct species of diving duck

The Réunion pochard (Aythya sp.), also known as the Mascarene Islands pochard, is an undescribed extinct species of diving duck that lived on the island of Réunion. In 1999 there were two carpometacarpi subfossils found by Cécile Mourer-Chauviré. There are only two historical records of a bird that meets its description, one from Bernardin in 1687 and one from Boucher in 1710. It is likely similar to the Madagascar pochard if not the same species.
