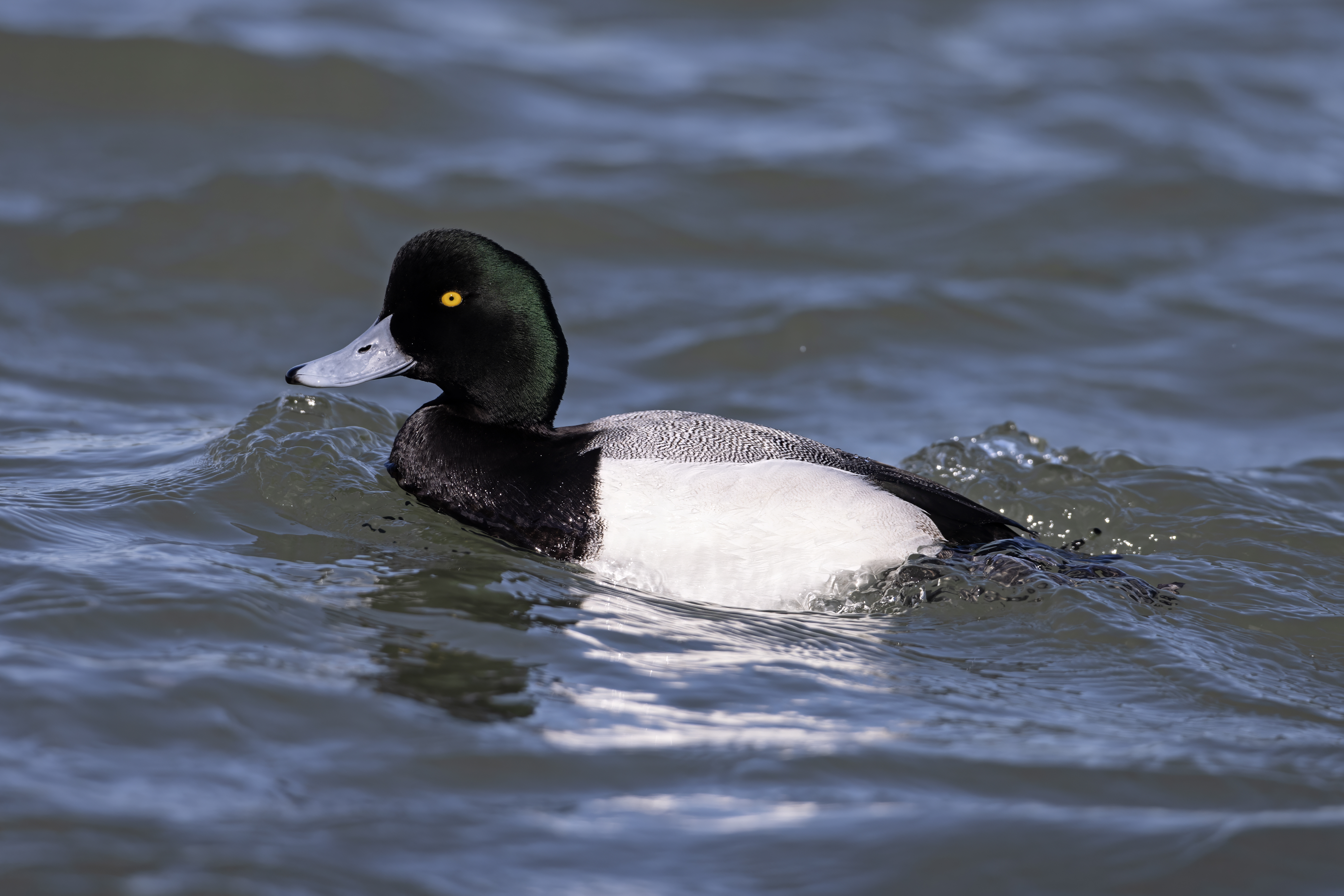
- American greater scaup (Aythya marila nearctica)

Scientific classification
- Kingdom: Animalia
- Phylum: Chordata
- Class: Aves
- Order: Anseriformes
- Family: Anatidae
- Tribe: Aythyini
- Genus: Aythya; F. Boie, 1822

Type species
- Anas marila marila Linnaeus, 1761

Species
- 12 species, see text

= Aythya =

Genus of birds

Aythya is a genus of diving ducks, with twelve species currently accepted. The genus was described in 1822 by the German zoologist Friedrich Boie, with the type species being greater scaup. The name Aythya comes from the Ancient Greek word αἴθυιᾰ (aithuia), which referred to an unknown diving-bird.

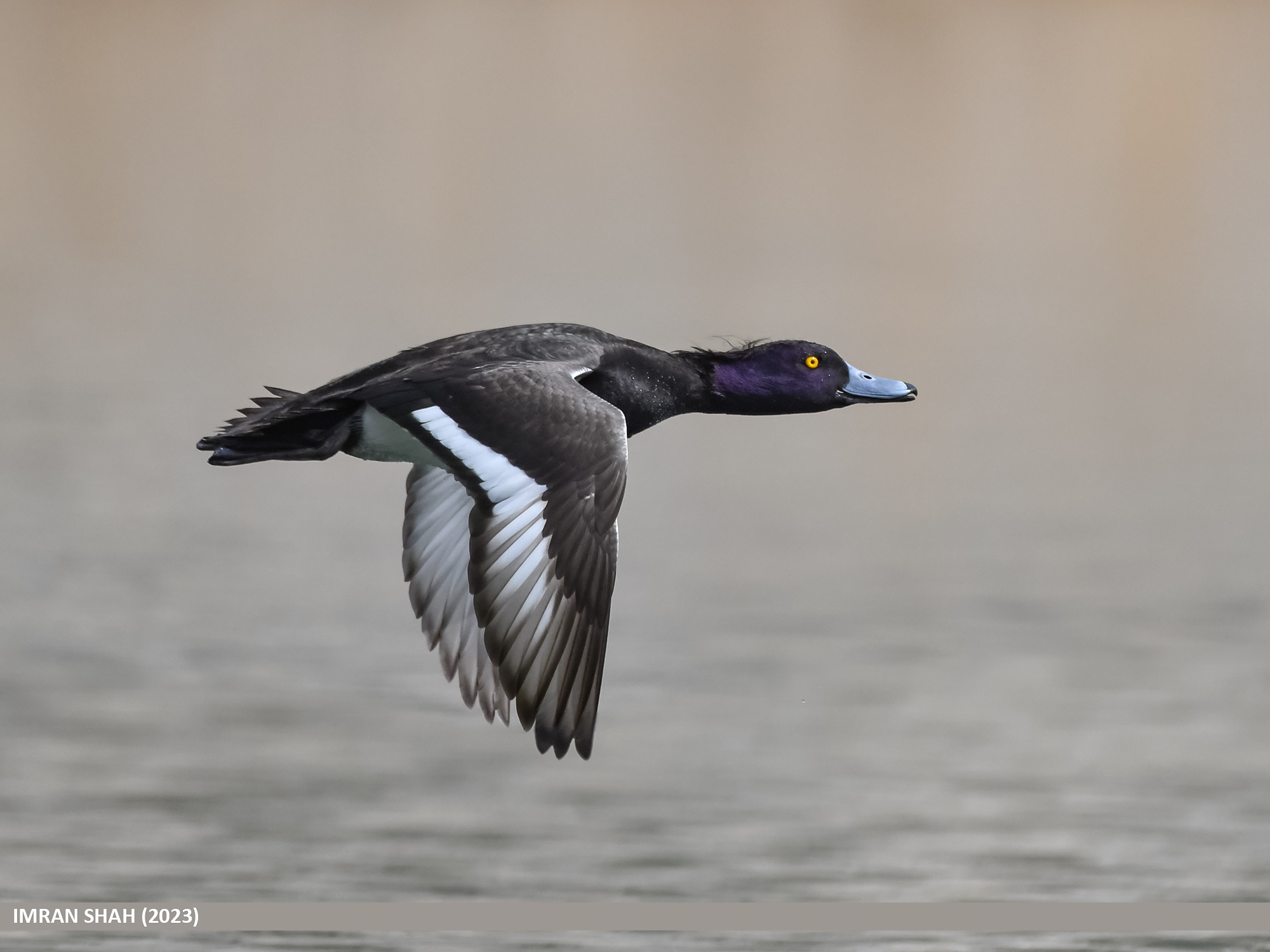
A tufted duck in flight showing the white wingbar

The species are plump, compact, medium-sized ducks ranging from 37–61 cm long, 60–84 cm wingspan, and weighing 410–1600 g, with canvasback the largest, and ring-necked duck and ferruginous duck marginally the smallest. The body plumage is variably white, grey, red-brown, or black, often with a finely vermiculated pattern; in several species, the flanks are white or pale grey, the back darker grey to black, and the breast and tail black. The heads are strongly coloured in the males, orange-red in some species, and black with a green to purple sheen (structural colour) in good light; the sheen colour varies with both species and angle of light incidence – in for example greater scaup, the head has a green sheen in direct light, but a purple sheen when backlit. In females, the heads are browner, sometimes with white patterning on the face. The eye colour is also variable in males, from white in ferruginous duck (leading to its archaic name of "white-eyed pochard"), through yellow in most species, to deep red in common pochard and canvasback; in females, the eye is brown in all species. The bills are short, fairly broad, and pale blue-grey to black, usually with a small black 'nail' at the tip; the pattern of blue-grey and black is important in species identification. In flight, the wings are dark grey to black, with a white to pale grey wingbar along the primary and secondary feathers; the pattern of the wingbar (whether all-white, or all-grey, or white on the secondaries and grey on the primaries) is an important identification feature. The webbed feet, used for propulsion in both swimming and diving, are 5–7 cm long, large for the size of the birds, and dark grey to blackish in all the species.

The species occur throughout Asia, Europe, North America, Australia, New Zealand, and Madagascar, and also in the northern half of Africa primarily in winter. Small numbers also reach the far north of South America in winter. In the breeding season, they are restricted to well-vegetated freshwater lakes, while in the winter they use both freshwater lakes and sheltered saltwater bays and inlets.

== Aythya species ==
The genus contains 12 species; all are monotypic except for A. marila, which has two subspecies in the Old and New Worlds, respectively.

Male	Female	Scientific name	Common name	Distribution	Conservation status
		A. valisineria	Canvasback	North America	least concern
		A. ferina	Common pochard	Northern Europe into Asia	vulnerable
		A. americana	Redhead	North America, from northern Canada to the lower United States	least concern
		A. collaris	Ring-necked duck	North America, from Alaska and northern Canada to the central United States, wintering south to the Caribbean; occasional visitor to Western Europe	least concern
		A. australis	Hardhead	Australia; occasional visitor to New Guinea, New Zealand, and Vanuatu in the Pacific	least concern
		A. baeri	Baer's pochard	Southeastern Russia and northeastern China, migrating in winter to southern China, Vietnam, Japan, and India	critically endangered
		A. nyroca	Ferruginous duck	From the Iberian Peninsula and the Maghreb east to western Mongolia, south to Arabia	near threatened
		A. innotata	Madagascar pochard	Madagascar	critically endangered
		A. novaeseelandiae	New Zealand scaup	New Zealand	least concern
		A. fuligula	Tufted duck	Throughout temperate and northern Eurasia; occasional visitor to the United States and Canada	least concern
		A. marila	Greater scaup	Iceland, Northern Europe, Northern Asia except the Far East (A. m. marila); far northeastern Asia, Alaska, northern Canada (A. m. nearctica)	least concern
		A. affinis	Lesser scaup	Alaska through western Canada to western Montana, wintering east to the Atlantic Coast and south to Central America; occasional visitor to Western Europe	least concern

== Hybrids ==
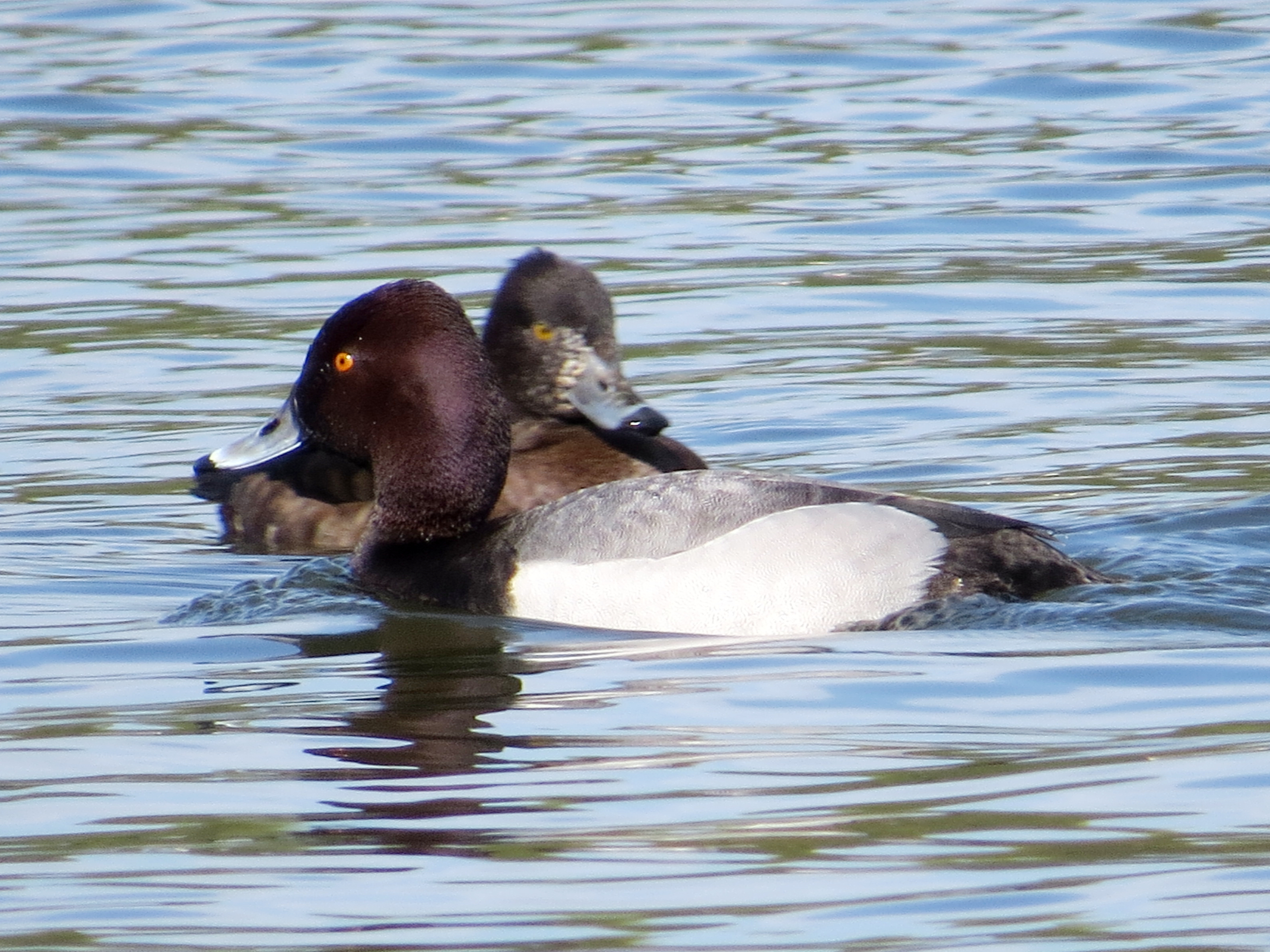
A tufted duck × common pochard hybrid. Note the casual resemblance to a lesser scaup in head shape, but distinguishable by the more uniform (less vermiculated) mantle feathers, and the bill pattern with a pale band and large black tip (uniform bluish in lesser scaup).

The species in the genus are all closely related, and are more prone to hybridisation than most other bird genera. Hybrids regularly seen in Europe include tufted duck × common pochard, tufted duck × ring-necked duck, greater scaup × tufted duck, and common pochard × ferruginous duck; while in North America, ring-necked duck × greater scaup, greater scaup × tufted duck, and canvasback × redhead are frequent. These hybrids can often resemble, and be mistaken for, other species in the genus; for example tufted duck × common pochard hybrids are easily mistaken for lesser scaup. Usually only male hybrids are evident; female hybrids are less obvious and even more difficult to identify.

== Diet ==
The diet, mostly obtained by diving to depths of 0.5–6 m (exceptionally 10 m), but also at times from the surface without diving, consists of a mixture of plant material (including seeds, leaves and roots of water plants) and bottom-dwelling invertebrates (including worms, molluscs, insects). In urban situations, several species have learnt to take bread or birdseed fed to ducks by people.

== Breeding ==
The nests are hidden in dense waterside vegetation, for preference on islets which give greater security from land predators. Incubation of the [2–]6–10[–18] eggs takes 3–4 weeks, and is done entirely by the female. The ducklings fledge at around 6–7 weeks old, and are cared for primarily by the female, though the male may assist with guarding the ducklings. 'Dump nesting', where more than one female lays eggs in a nest, is common, and likely accounts for nests containing more than ten eggs.

== Prehistory ==
Aythya shihuibas was described from the Late Miocene of China, but probably belongs outside crown group Aythya. Zelenkov (2016) transferred the species Anas denesi Kessler (2013), known from the late Miocene of Hungary, to the genus Aythya. An undescribed prehistoric species is known only from Early Pleistocene fossil remains found at Dursunlu, Turkey; it might however be referrable to a paleosubspecies of an extant species considering its age (see also Greater scaup). Subfossils have also been found on Réunion; this Réunion pochard awaits formal description, and may prove to have been a population of the Madagascar pochard.

The Miocene "Aythya" arvernensis is now placed in Mionetta, while "Aythya" chauvirae seems to contain the remains of two species, at least one of which does not seem to be a diving duck.

== See also ==
- Late Quaternary prehistoric birds
- List of fossil bird genera

== Gallery ==
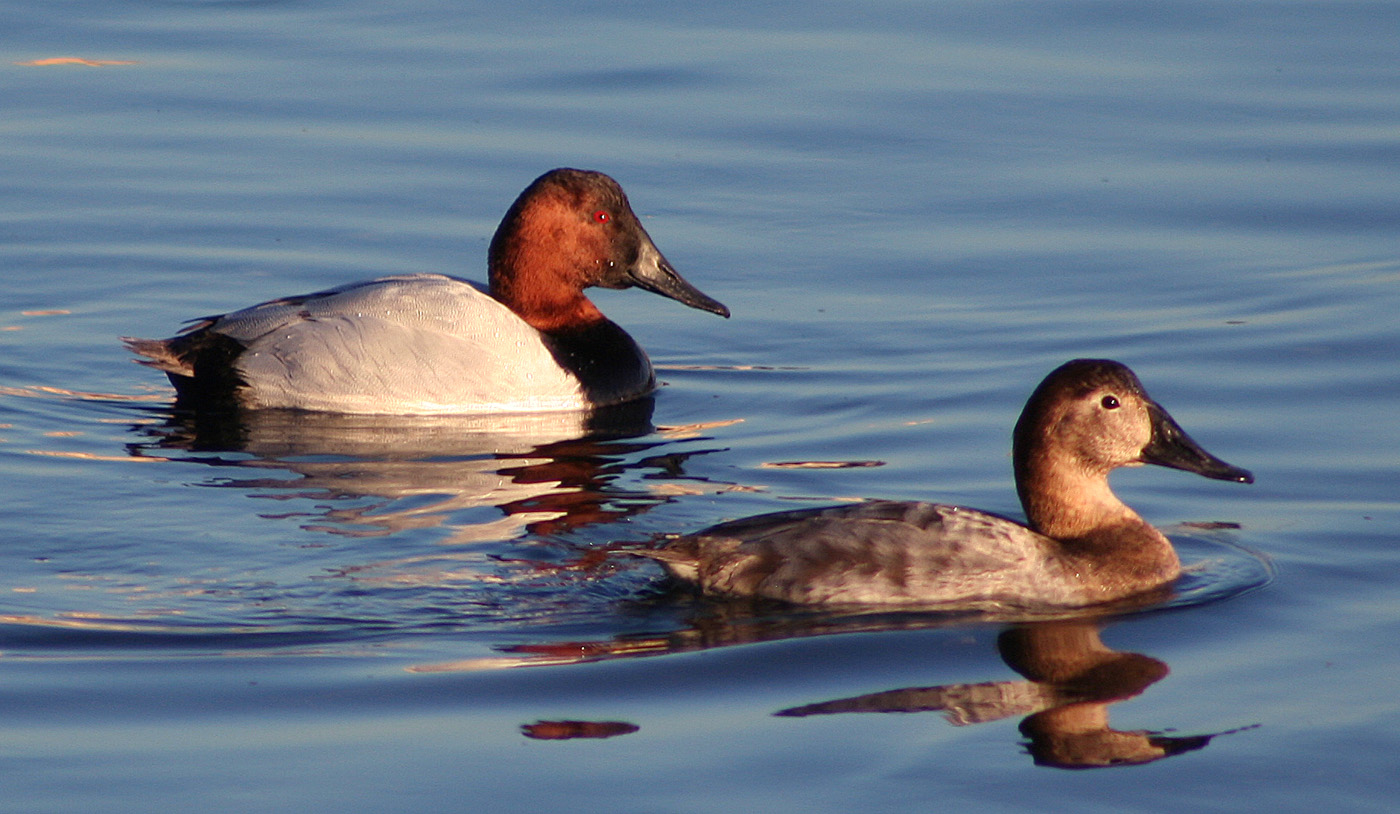
Canvasback (Aythya valisineria)

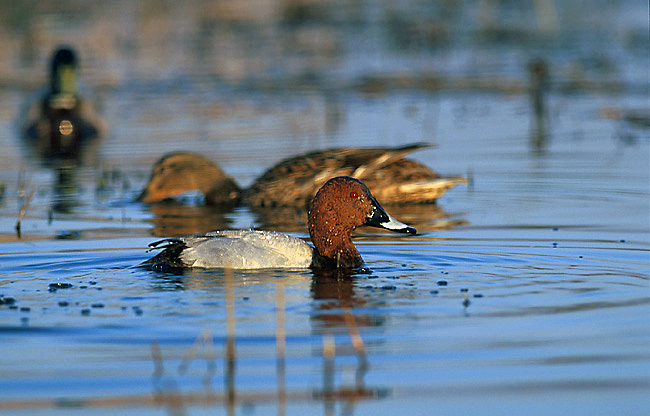
Common pochard (Aythya ferina)

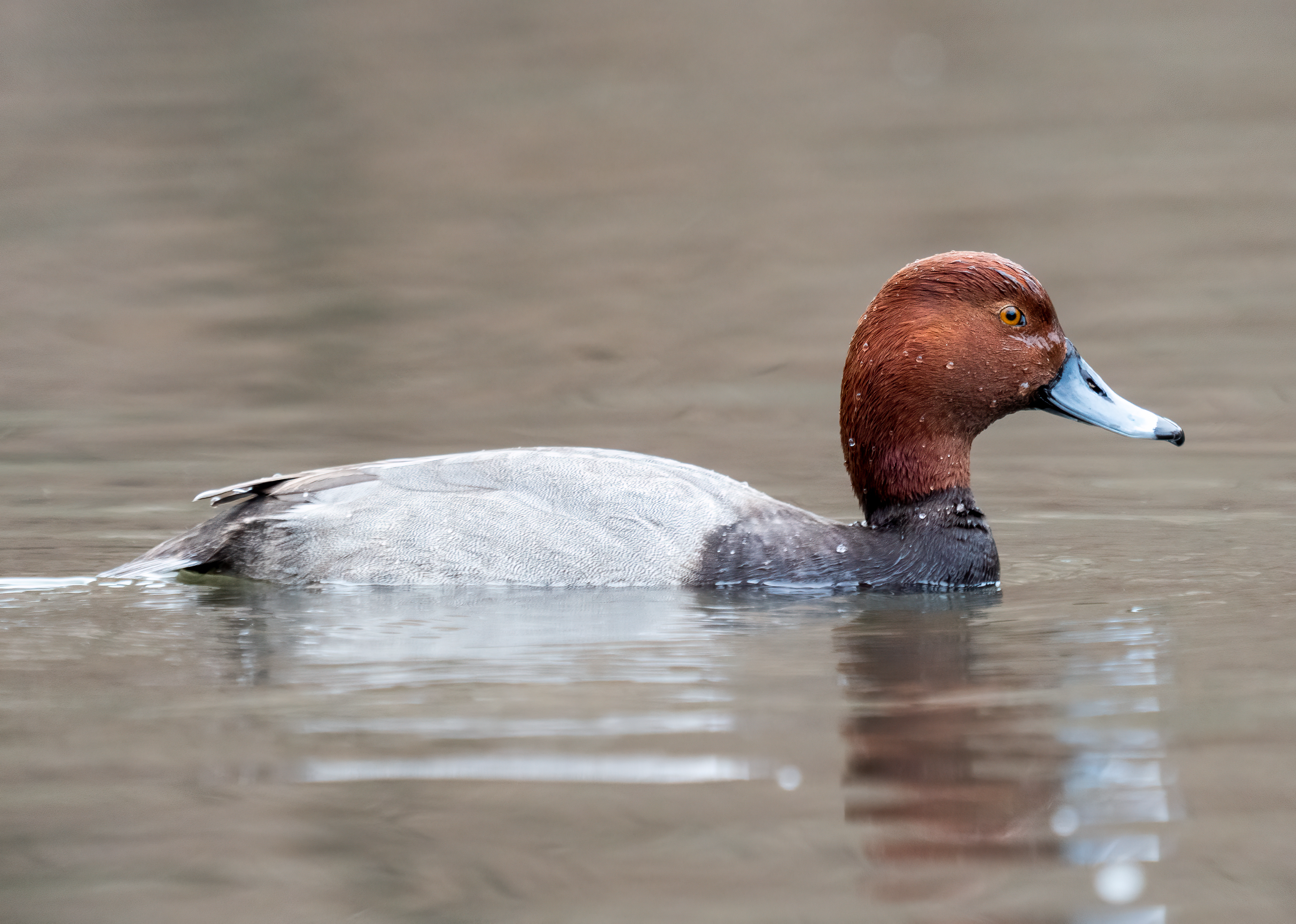
Redhead (Aythya americana)

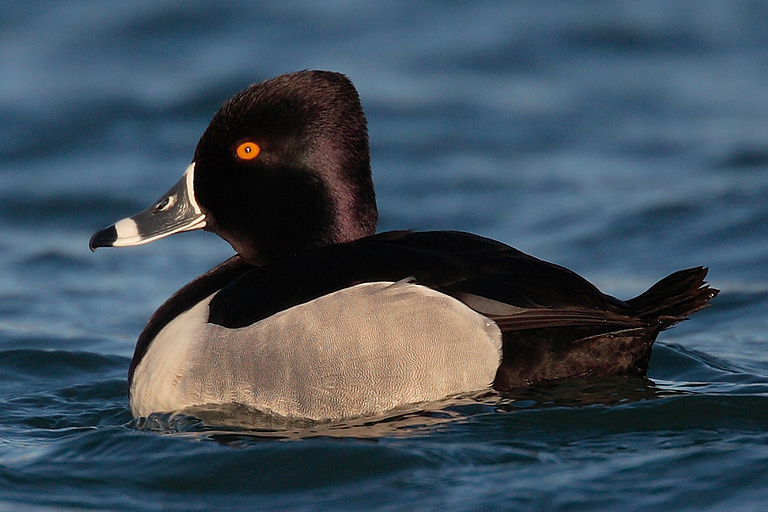
Ring-necked duck (Aythya collaris)

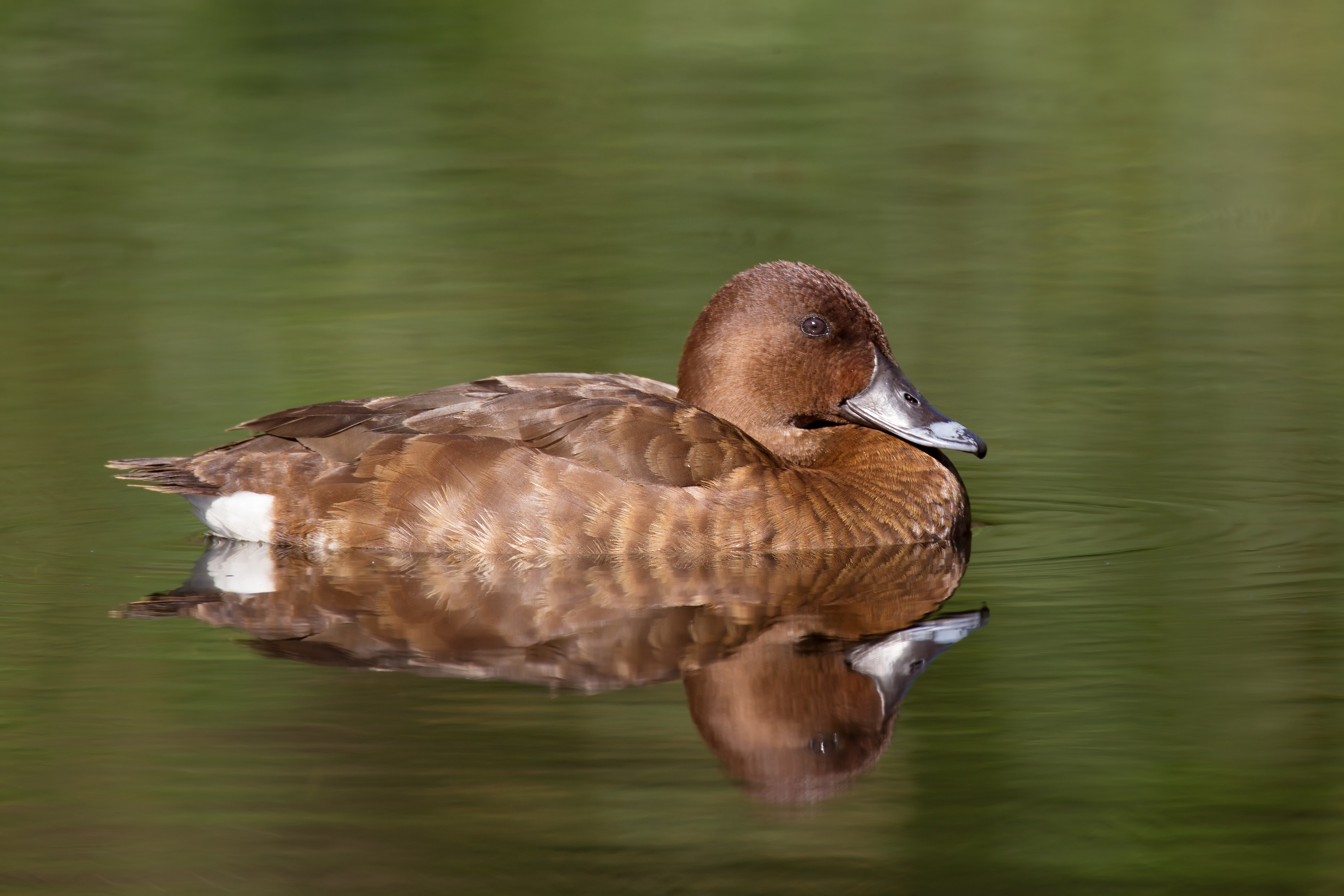
Female Hardhead (Aythya australis)

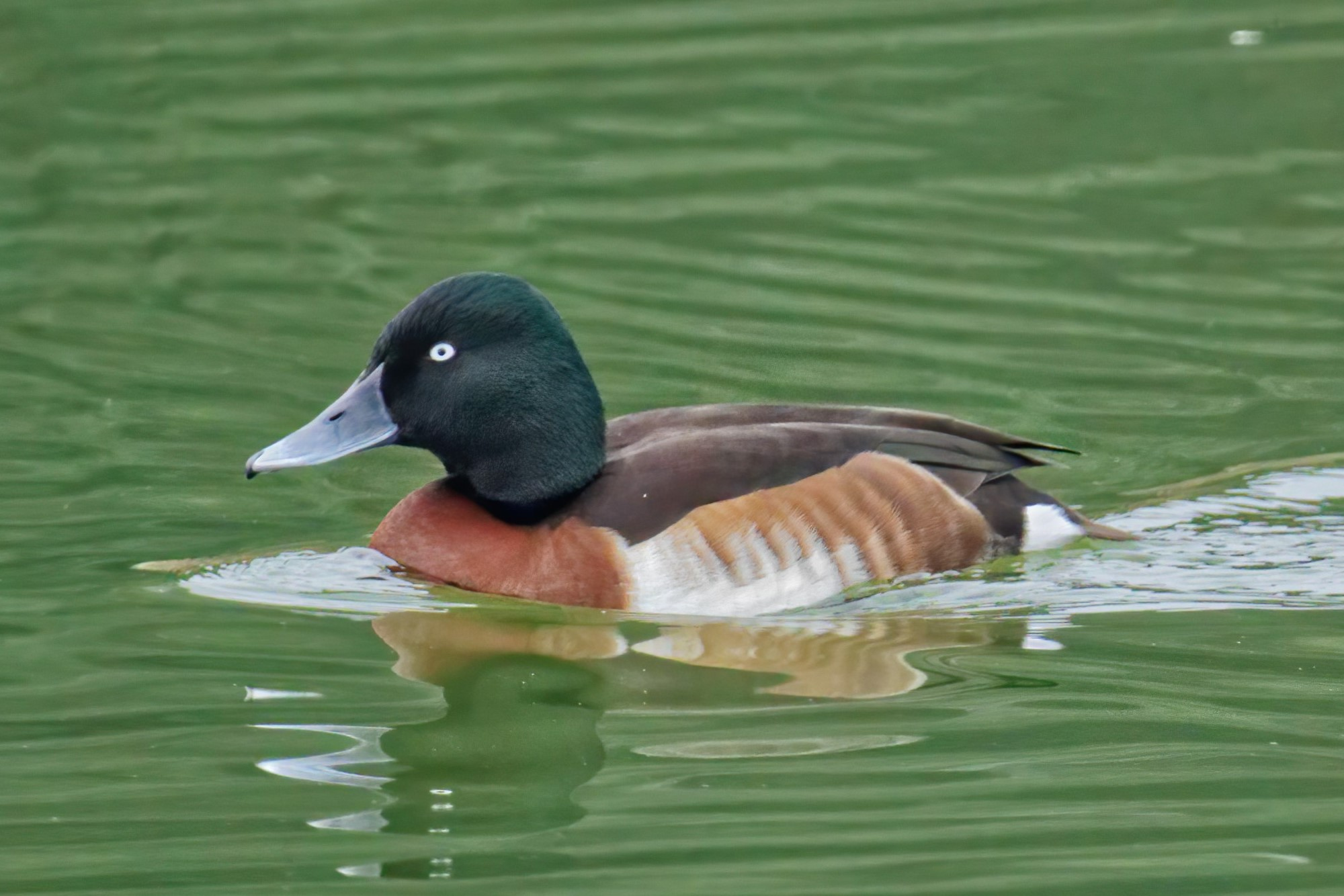
Baer's pochard (Aythya baeri)

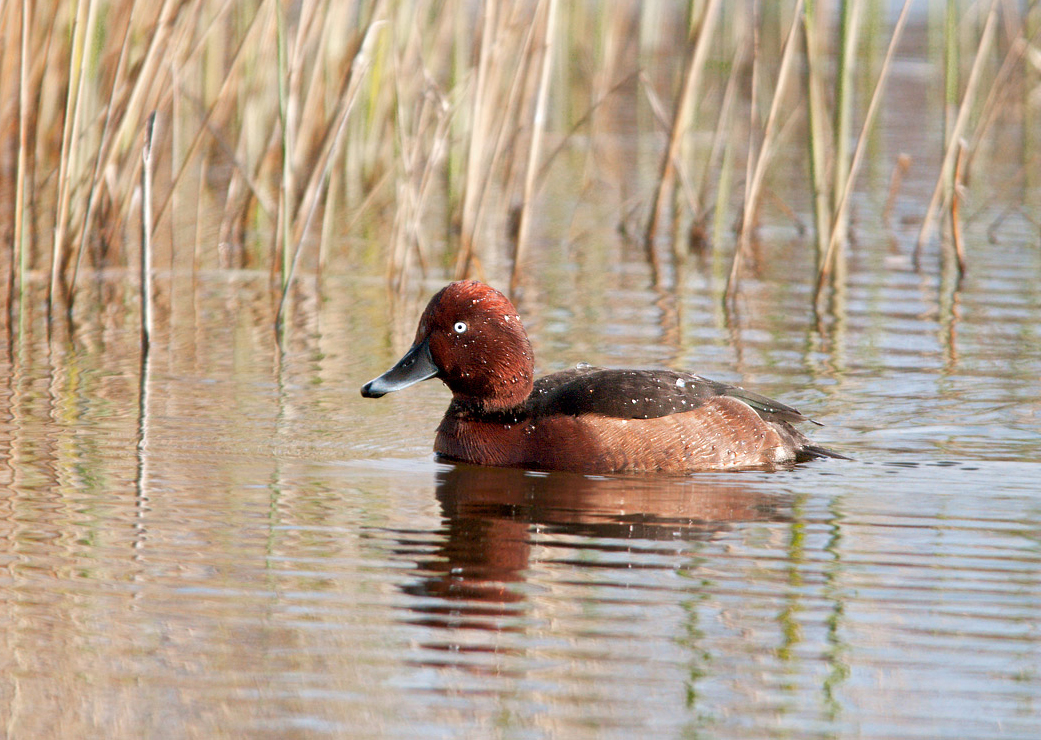
Ferruginous duck (Aythya nyroca)

Madagascar pochard (Aythya innotata)

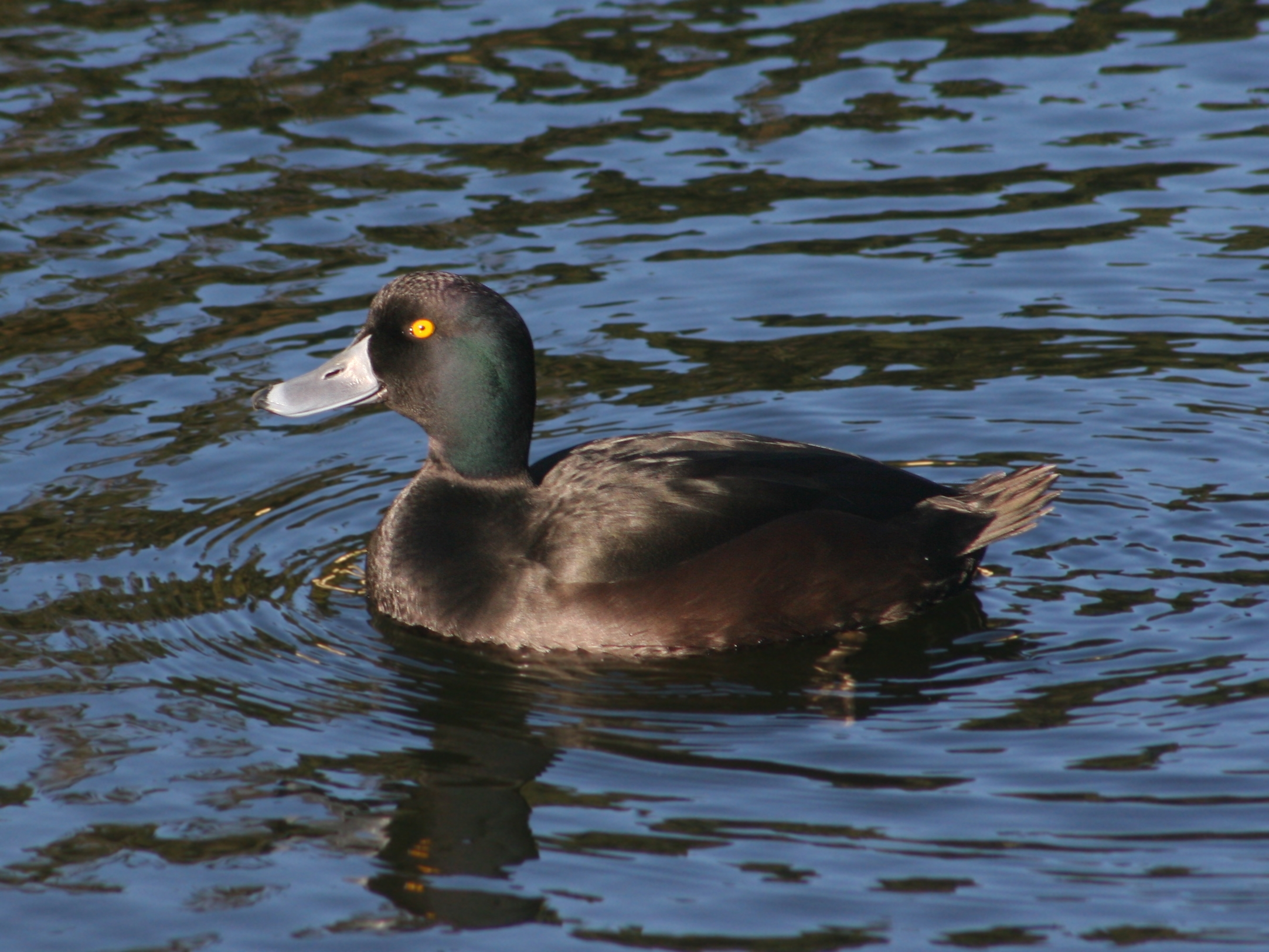
New Zealand scaup (Aythya novaeseelandiae)

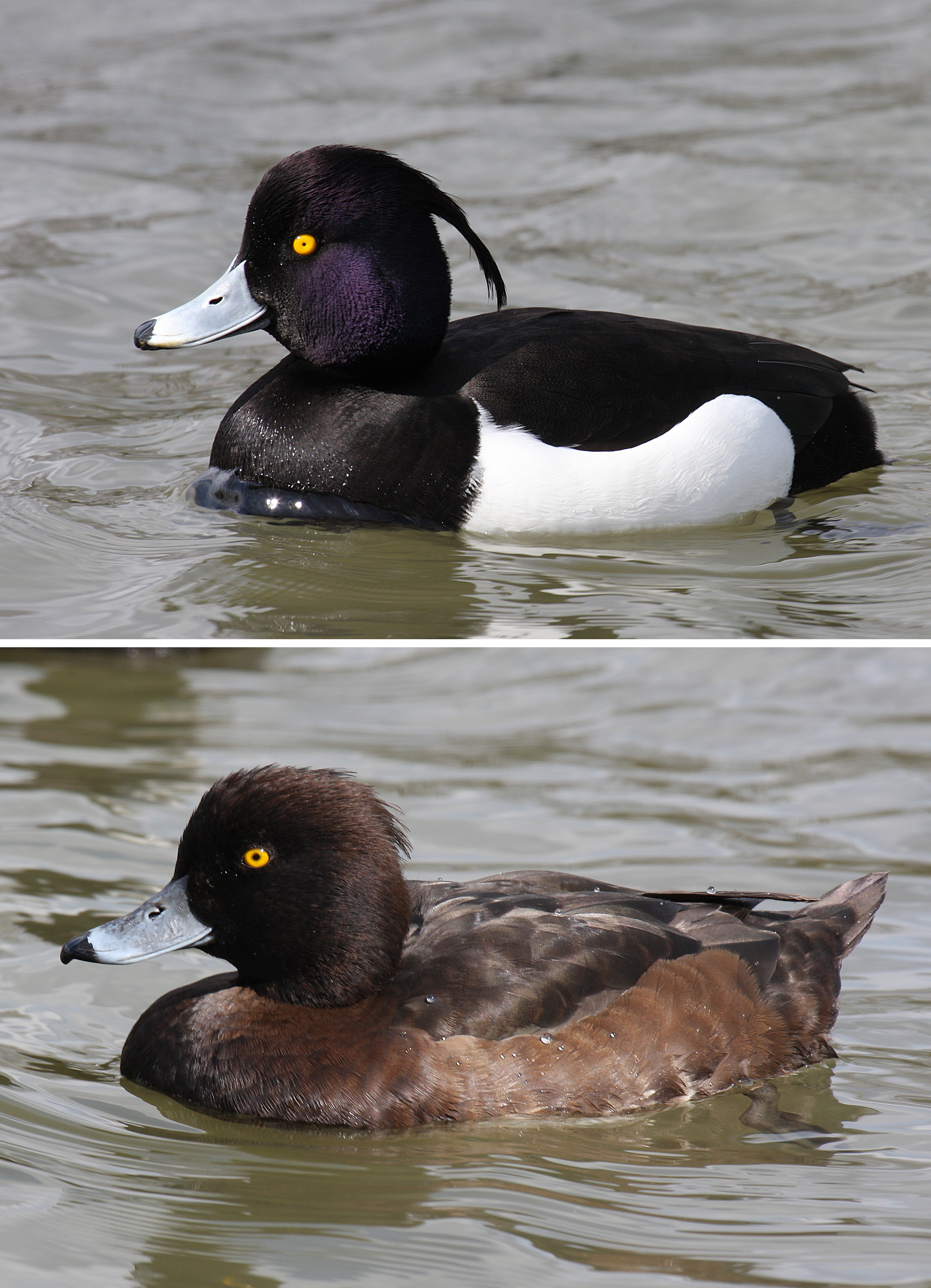
Tufted duck (Aythya fuligula)

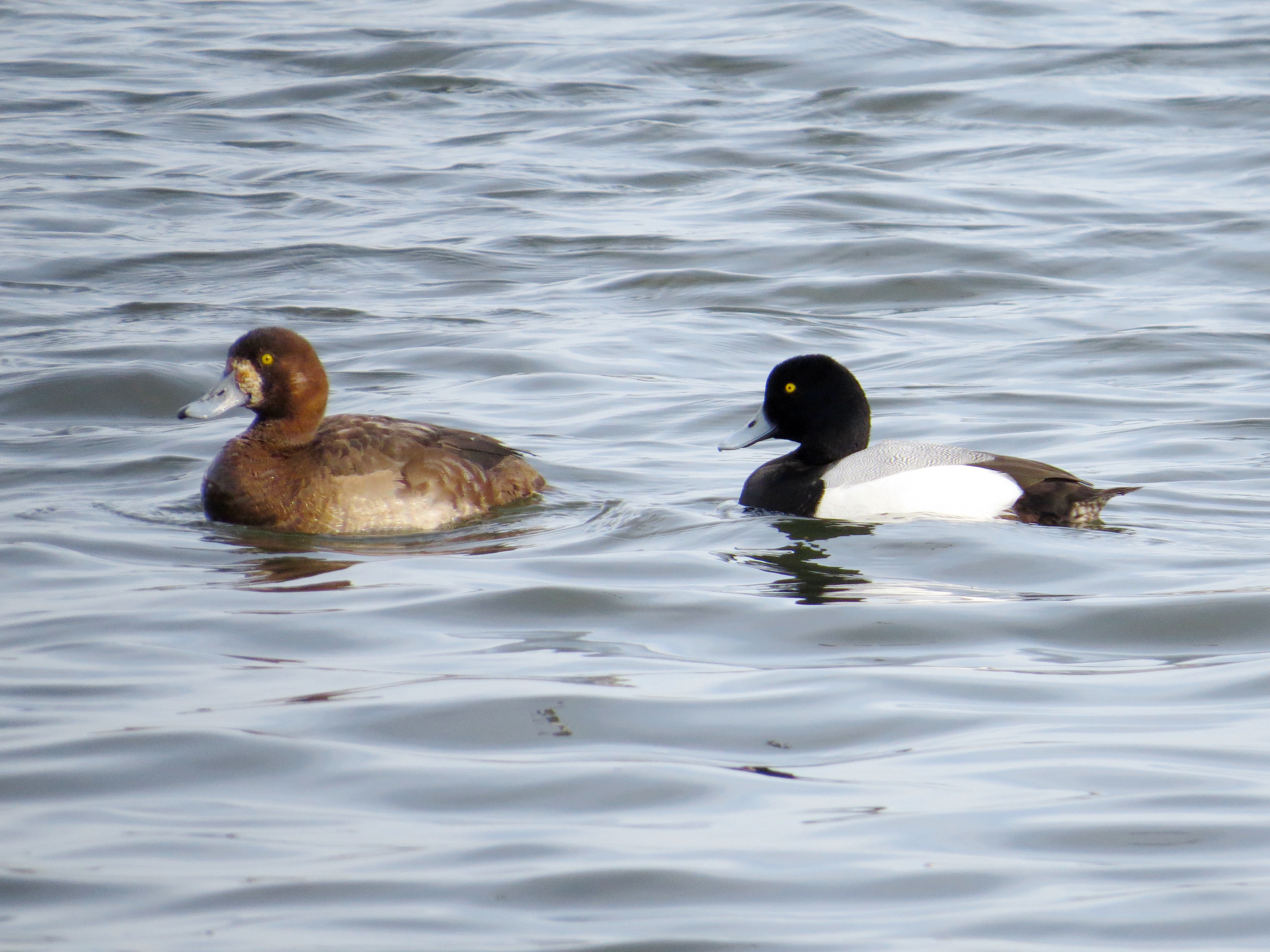
Greater scaup (Aythya marila)

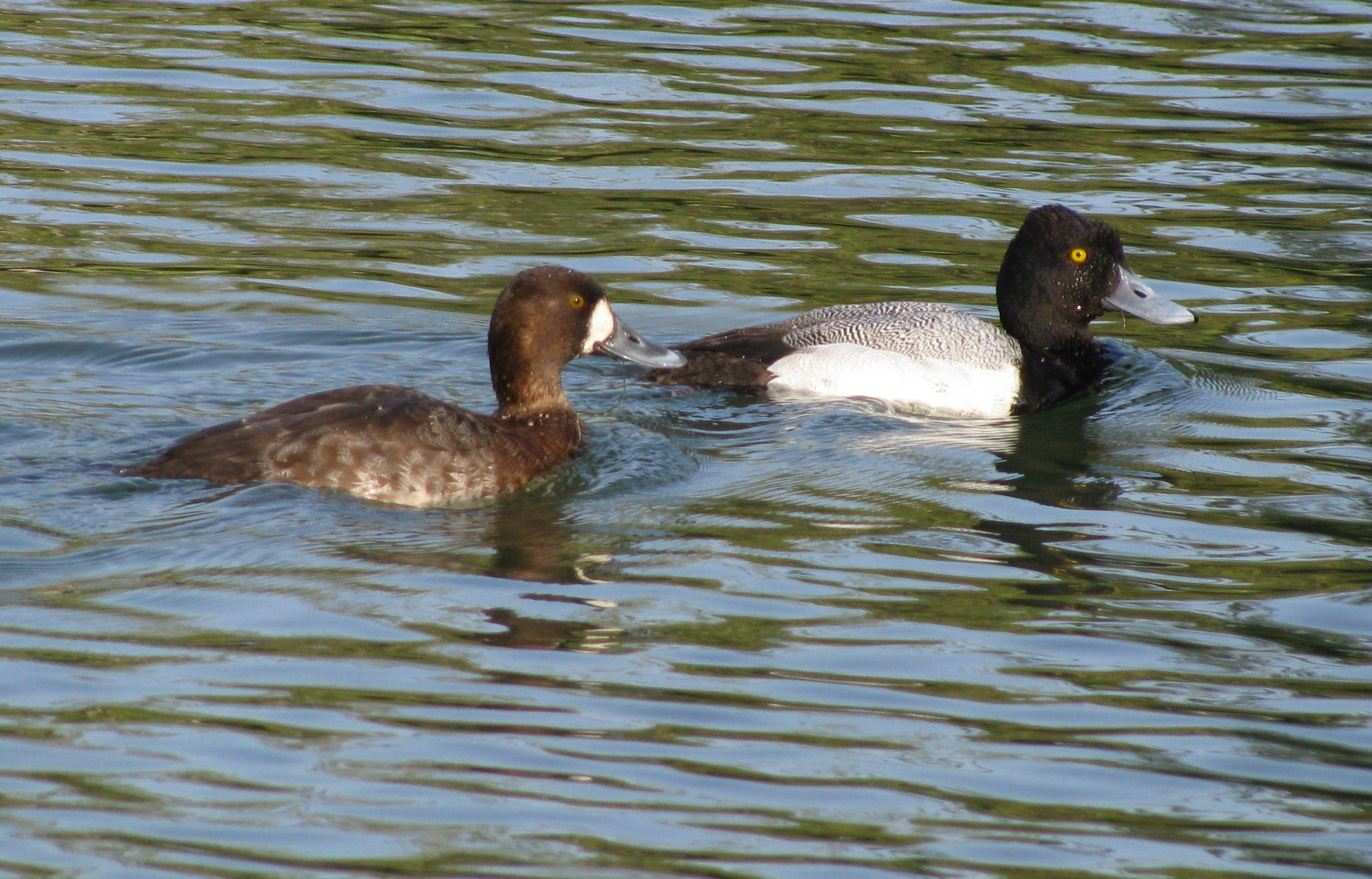
Lesser scaup (Aythya affinis)
