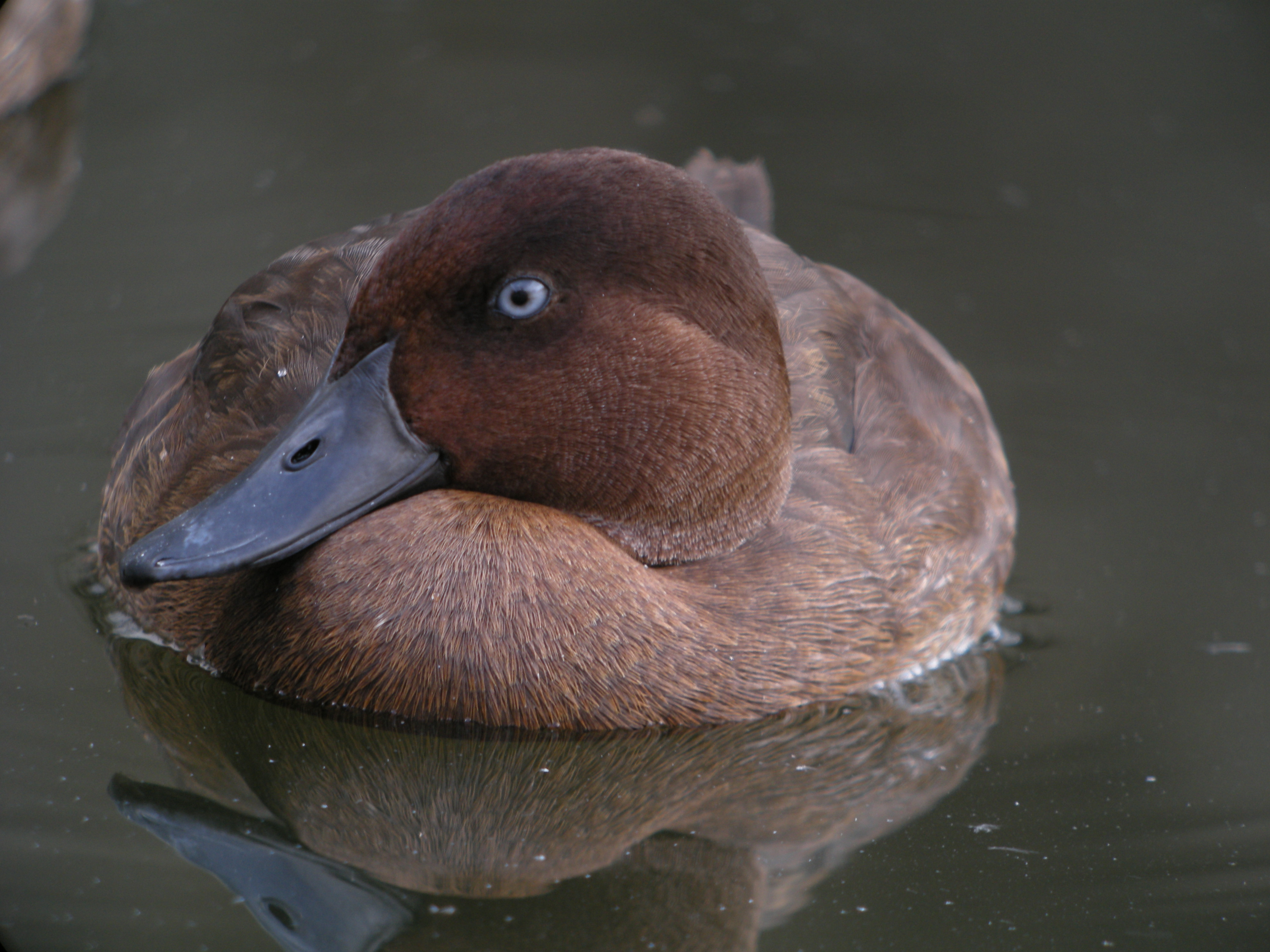
- Male Madagascar pochard, captive breeding program, Madagascar
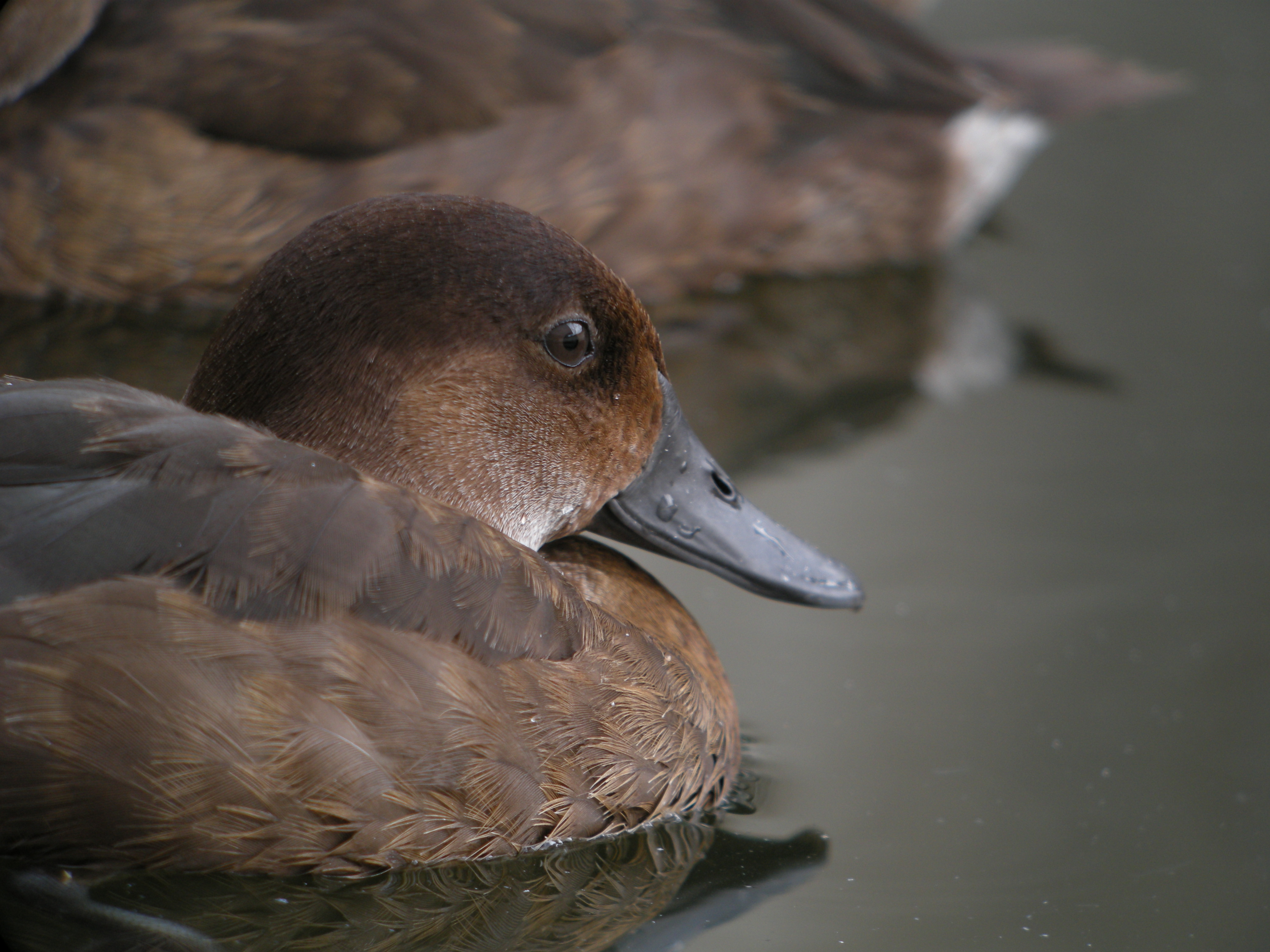
- Female Madagascar pochard, captive breeding program, Madagascar

Conservation status
- Critically Endangered (IUCN 3.1)

Scientific classification
- Kingdom: Animalia
- Phylum: Chordata
- Class: Aves
- Order: Anseriformes
- Family: Anatidae
- Genus: Aythya
- Species: A. innotata

Binomial name
- Aythya innotata (Salvadori, 1894)
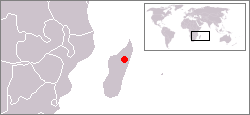
- Former range (in red)

Synonyms
- Nyroca innotata Salvadori, 1894 (basionym)

= Madagascar pochard =

Species of bird

The Madagascar pochard or Madagascan pochard (Aythya innotata; Malagasy: Fotsy maso, Onjo) is an extremely rare diving duck of the genus Aythya. Thought to be extinct in the late 1990s, specimens of the species were rediscovered at Lake Matsaborimena near Bemanevika in Madagascar in 2006. By 2017, a captive breeding program had produced a population of around 90 individuals. The birds were reintroduced to the wild in December 2018.

The Madagascar pochard feeds mainly on aquatic insects, unlike other diving ducks in the same genus, The population is small, fluctuating around 25 individuals, and mainly utilises two small volcanic lakes in the far north of Madagascar.

Aythya ducklings begin making short dives at around 14 days old, before which they feed on the surface.

== Taxonomy ==
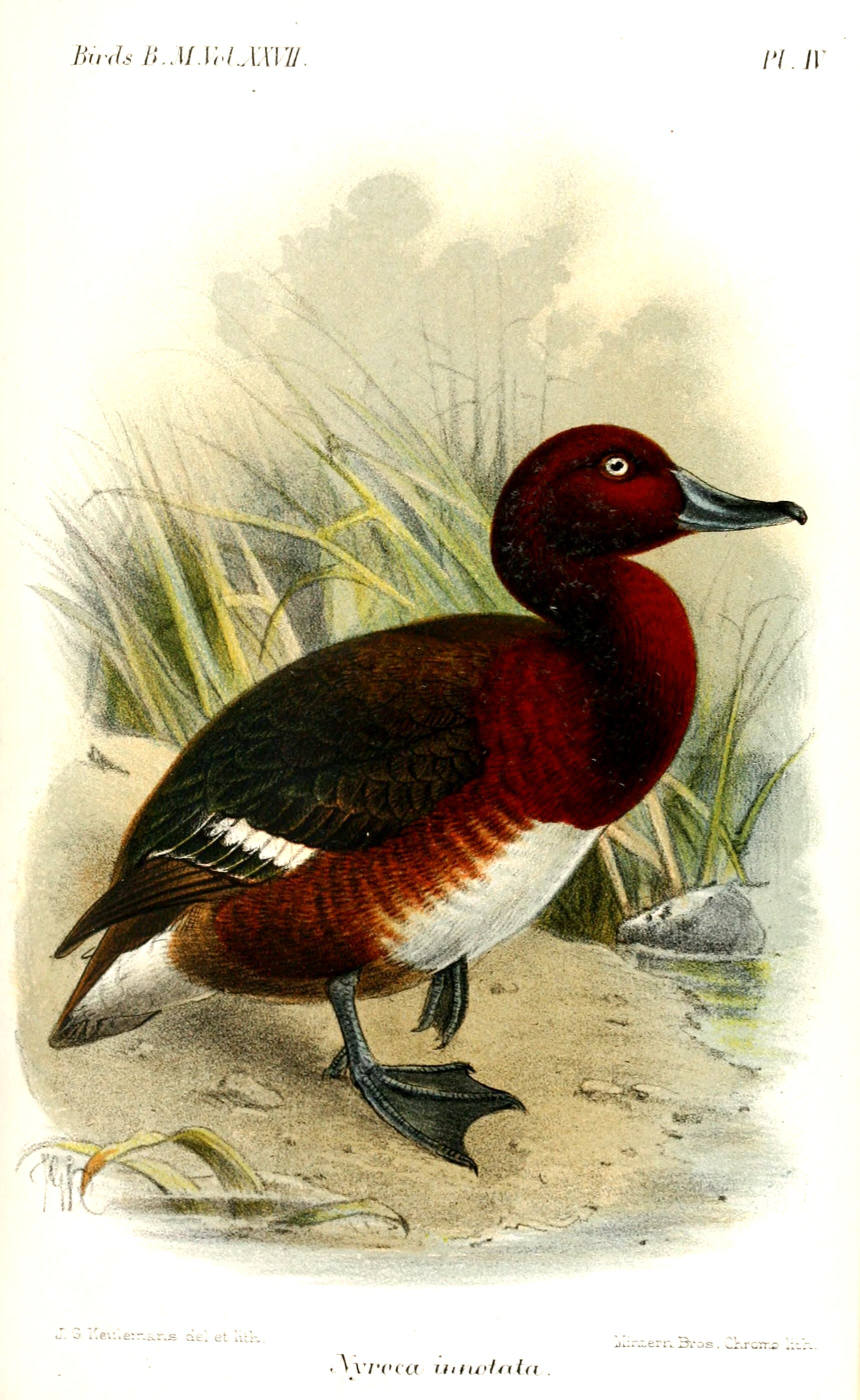
The Madagascar pochard in the Catalogue of the Birds in the British Museum. Volume 27, 1895.

The Madagascar pochard was largely overlooked by scientists in the 19th century, as those that saw it assumed they were seeing ferruginous ducks instead. Even after its description in 1894 little notice was taken of the species, and even numbers are hard to gauge from early accounts of the species. Based on the accounts written by Webb and Delacour's in the 1920s and 1930s it seemed that the bird was still relatively common at Lake Alaotra.

The Madagascar pochard is generally thought to be closely related to the Hardhead, Baer's pochard and ferruginous duck. It is monotypic, having no described or known subspecies.

== Description ==
The pochard is a medium-sized duck between 42 and 56 centimeters in size. Juvenile ducks have brown irises and are a pale, dull brown or chestnut colour with a darker stomach. The adults are darker in colour, though during a male duck's first winter, its iris will turn white. Breeding males have dark chestnut heads, chins, throats, breasts, and necks, with blackish brown on the top side of the body. Their wings are dark brown with a white bar. The area under the bodies from the stomach to the tail fades to white, as do the undersides of the wings. The beaks and legs are dark grey with black nails.

Vocalizations may include "[when] in display [...] the male utters a cat-like wee-oow and a rolling rrr, while the female gives a harsh squak."

== Distribution and ecology ==
The species exclusively lives in inland wetlands in Madagascar, where it is endemic. Currently, the only wild populations are at Lake Sofia and Lake Matsaborimena.

Historically, the birds preferred shallow lakes and marshes with dense vegetation; however, the rediscovered population was found in a cold, deep crater lake that had few aquatic plants and was surrounded by heavy forest, and other remote crater lakes may have been inhabitable due to the birds' requirements for shallower water. Its previous habitat in the Lake Alaotra basin was disturbed by rice cultivation and invasive introduced fishes.

== Behaviour ==
Madagascar pochards do not migrate, do not usually form flocks, and are usually found in pairs or as single ducks.

=== Diet and feeding ===
The Madagascar pochard spends 38% of its day feeding. The diet is dominated by aquatic insects; a study examining their faeces found that caddisflies were the most commonly found insect, followed by dragonfly larvae, bugs (Hemiptera) and flies from the family Chironomidae. Stable isotope analysis and the faecal studies have shown that their diet includes very little plant material, which is unusual when compared to their relatives in the genus Aythya.

The bird dives for much of its food, with a mean diving time of around 24 seconds. Ducklings feed on the surface until they are old enough to dive, at around 14 days, and make shorter dives once they do dive (around 10 seconds).

=== Breeding ===
Observers have noted nesting behaviour from July to February, sometimes with multiple attempts at nesting. Nests are found 20–40 cm above water, in the plants along the lake or marsh edges (noted in Cyperaceae), with 6 to 10 eggs per clutch.

== Relationship with humans ==
=== Decline ===
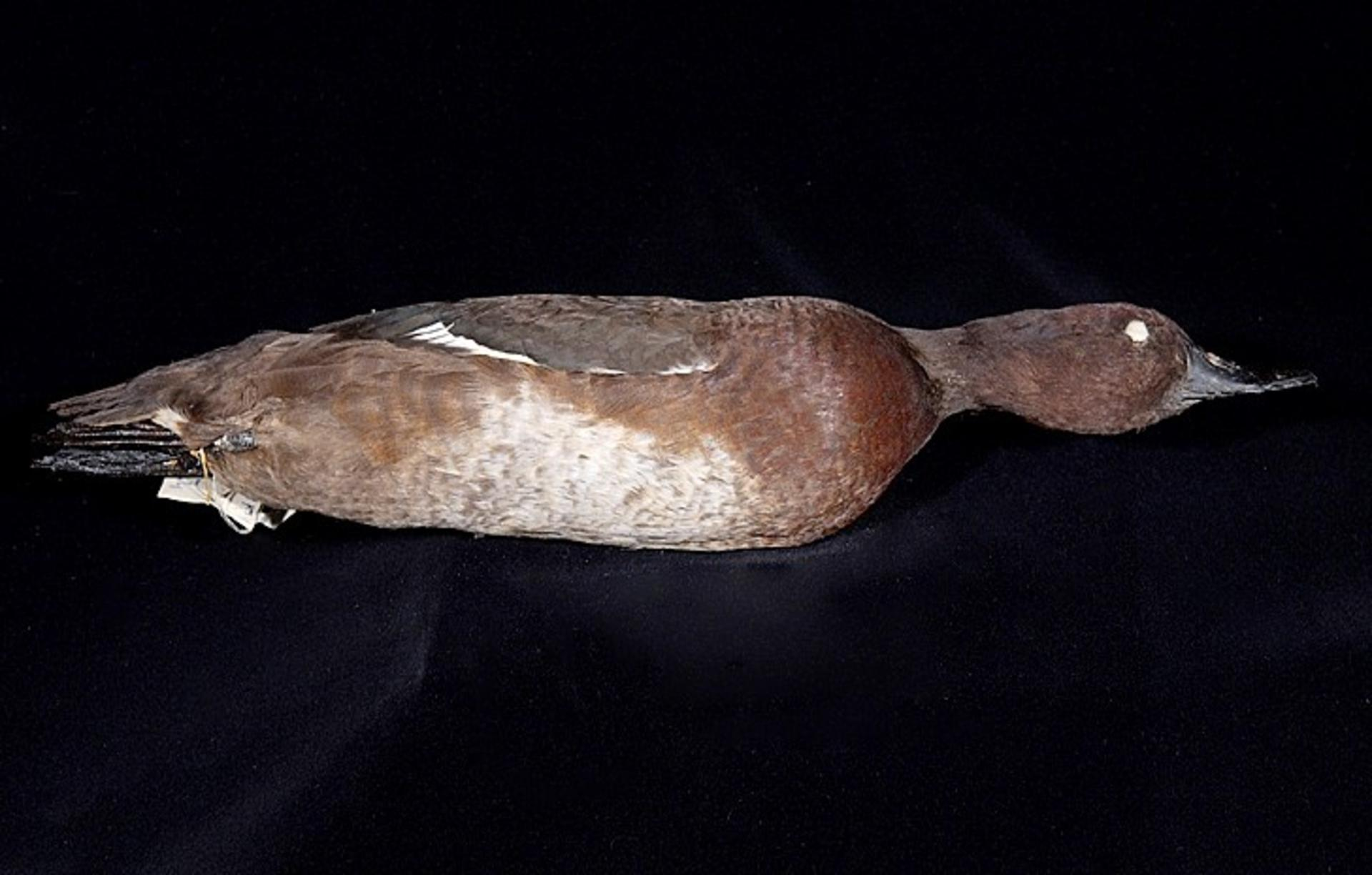
The 1960 specimen now held by the Naturalis Biodiversity Center

The duck probably started to decline dramatically sometime in the late 1940s or early 1950s. The cause of decline was the introduction of numerous fish species in the lake that killed most of the pochard chicks and damaged nesting sites. Adult birds are also likely to have become victims of introduced fishes. Rice cultivation, cattle grazing on the shores, burning of shore vegetation, introduced mammals (rats), gill-net fishing and hunting are all factors that led to the duck's disappearance from the lake. The last record of multiple birds at Lake Alaotra is from 9 June 1960 when a small flock of about 20 birds was spotted on the lake. Despite the rarity of the species in 1960, a male was shot, and the specimen was held by the Zoological Museum Amsterdam, and later the Naturalis Biodiversity Center. There is a very dubious report of a sighting made outside Antananarivo in 1970.

=== Rediscovery and reintroduction ===
Before it was rediscovered in 2006, the last confirmed sighting of the species was at Lake Alaotra on the Central Plateau of Madagascar in 1991. The single male then encountered was captured and kept in the Antananarivo Botanical Gardens until it died one year later. Intensive searches and publicity campaigns in 1989–1990, 1993–1994 and 2000–2001 failed to produce any more records of this bird.

However, a flock of nine adults and four recently hatched ducklings were discovered at Lake Matsaborimena, in a remote area of northern Madagascar, in November 2006. Though their habitat was "too deep and too cold for the pochards to thrive", it was one of the few wetlands on the island still capable of supporting the remaining few birds due to damage from pollution, invasive species, and agricultural practices in other wetlands. The species was placed in the new "Possibly Extinct" category in the 2006 IUCN Red List; following the rediscovery, its old status of Critically Endangered was restored in the 2007 issue. As of 2008, only 25 adult birds had been counted in the wild.

=== Conservation ===
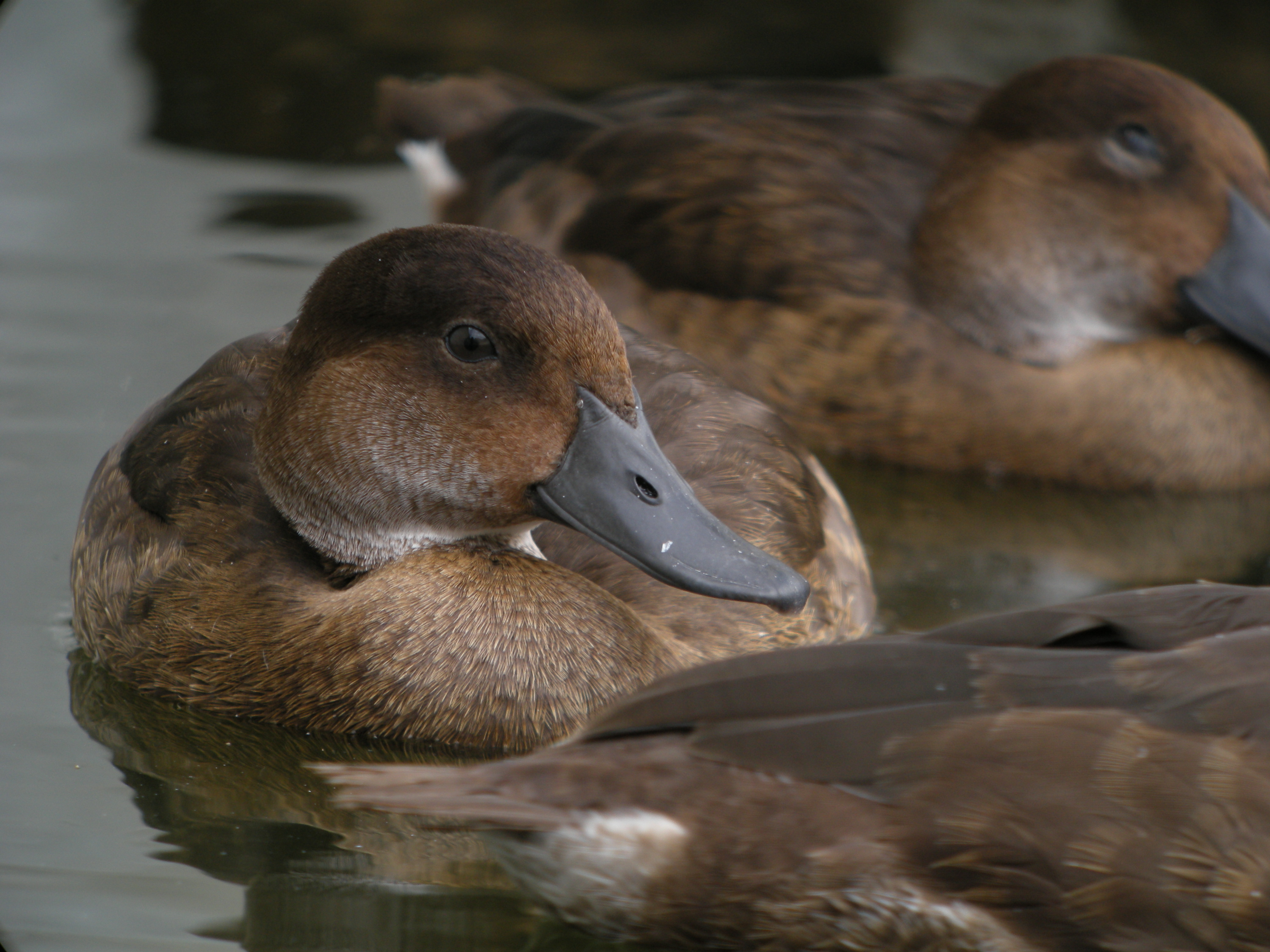
A. innotata in a captive breeding program in Madagascar.

In 2009, a rescue plan involving the Durrell Wildlife Conservation Trust and the Wildfowl and Wetlands Trust removed a batch of ready-to-hatch eggs from a lake-side nest and incubated them in a lab that was set up in a tent beside the lake. After hatching, the day-old chicks were taken to a holding facility in a local hotel. By the end of 2009, the organizations, including The Peregrine Fund, collected three clutches for 24 eggs to hatch 23 ducklings in total. Reared in captivity, they hatched eighteen ducklings in April 2012 at the captive breeding centre in Antsohihy, bringing the total population to 60.

2011 marked the first chick to hatch from captive breeding efforts. In April 2013, the population reached 80. In Autumn 2017 the population reached 90, causing the Wildfowl and Wetlands Trust and the Durrell Wildlife Conservation Trust to begin preparations for the reintroduction process at a suitable lake in Madagascar, Lake Sofia, including working with the communities surrounding the lake. In December 2018, 21 of the birds were released at Lake Sofia, where floating aviaries were installed to protect the birds.

== See also ==
- Endemic birds of Madagascar and western Indian Ocean islands
