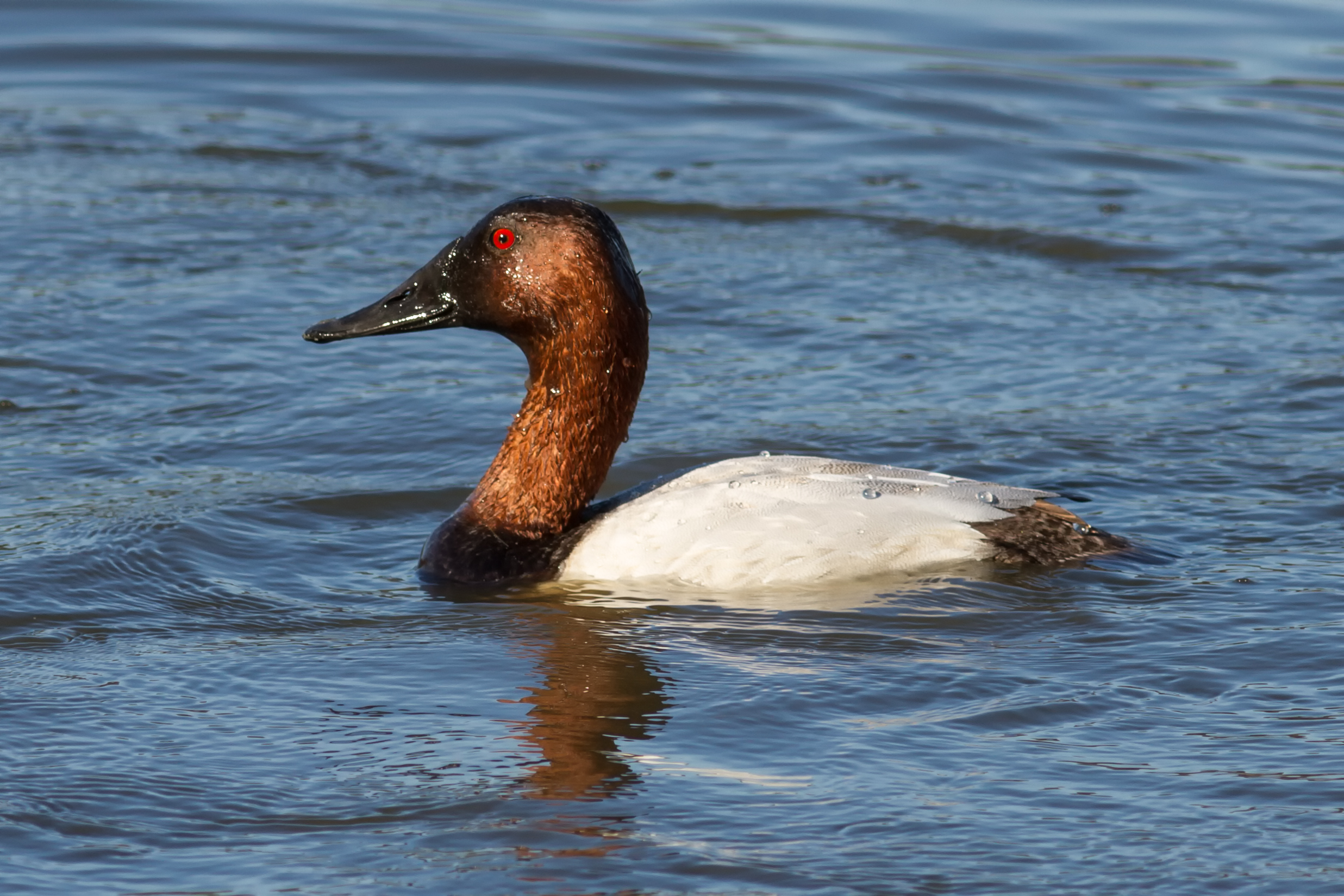
- Male
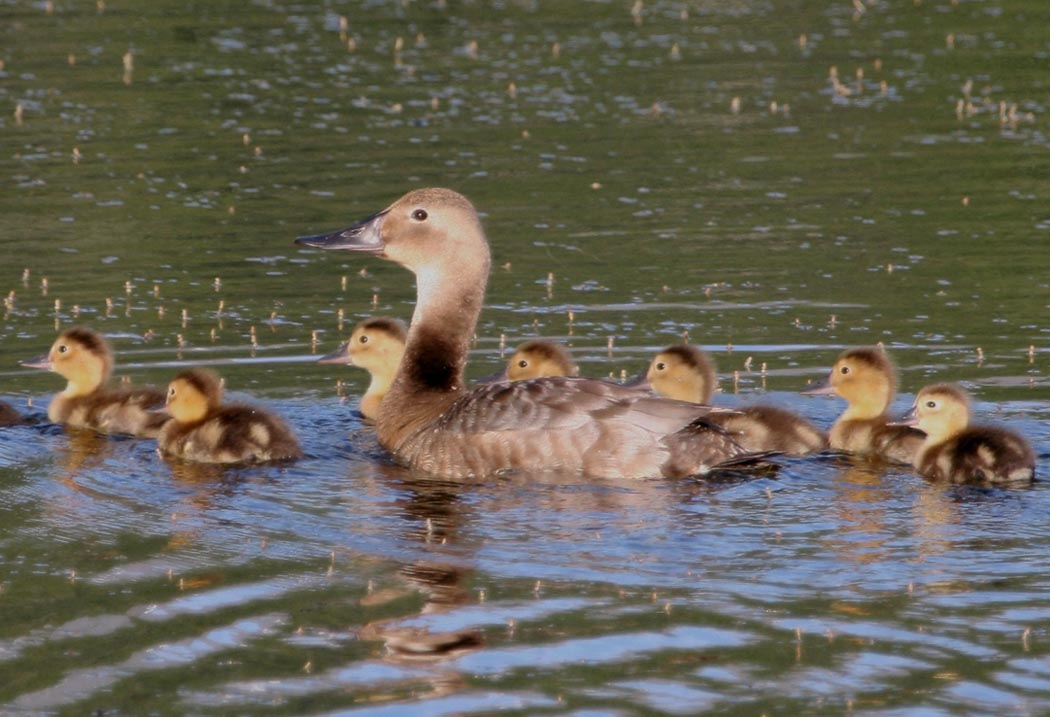
- Female with ducklings

Conservation status
- Least Concern (IUCN 3.1)

Scientific classification
- Kingdom: Animalia
- Phylum: Chordata
- Class: Aves
- Order: Anseriformes
- Family: Anatidae
- Genus: Aythya
- Species: A. valisineria

Binomial name
- Aythya valisineria (Wilson, 1814)
- Breeding Migration Year-round Nonbreeding

Synonyms
- Aythya vallisneria (lapsus)

= Canvasback =

Canvasback Temporal range: Pleistocene–present

Species of bird

The canvasback (Aythya valisineria) is a species of diving duck, the largest found in North America.

== Taxonomy ==
Scottish-American naturalist Alexander Wilson described the canvasback in 1814. The genus name is derived from Greek aithuia, an unidentified seabird mentioned by authors, including Hesychius and Aristotle. The species name valisineria comes from the wild celery Vallisneria americana, whose winter buds and rhizomes are the canvasback's preferred food during the nonbreeding period. The celery genus is itself named for seventeenth century Italian botanist Antonio Vallisneri.

The duck's common name is based on early European inhabitants of North America's assertion that its back was a canvas-like color. In other languages it is just a white-backed duck; for example in French, morillon à dos blanc, or Spanish, pato lomo blanco. In Mexico it is called pato coacoxtle.

== Description ==
It ranges from 48–56 cm (19–22 in) in length and weighs 862–1,588 g (1.900–3.501 lb), with a wingspan of 79–89 cm (31–35 in). It is the largest species in the genus Aythya, and the largest diving duck in North America. Canvasbacks are similar in size to a mallard but with a heavier and more compact build. 191 males wintering in western New York averaged 1,252 g (2.760 lb) and 54 females there averaged 1,154 g (2.544 lb). The canvasback has a distinctive wedge-shaped head and long graceful neck. The adult male (drake) has a black bill, a chestnut red head and neck, a black breast, a grayish back, black rump, and a blackish brown tail. The drake's sides, back, and belly are white with fine vermiculation resembling the weave of a canvas, which gave rise to the bird's common name. The iris is bright red in the spring, but duller in the winter. The adult female (hen) also has a black bill, a light brown head and neck, grading into a darker brown chest and foreback. The sides, flanks, and back are grayish brown. The bill is blackish and the legs and feet are bluish-gray. Its sloping profile distinguishes it from other ducks.

== Breeding ==
The breeding habitat of the canvasback is in North American prairie potholes. The bulky nest is built from vegetation in a marsh and lined with down. Loss of nesting habitat has caused populations to decline. The canvasback usually takes a new mate each year, pairing in late winter on ocean bays. It prefers to nest over water on permanent prairie marshes surrounded by emergent vegetation, such as cattails and bulrushes, which provide protective cover. Other important breeding areas are the subarctic river deltas in Saskatchewan and the interior of Alaska.

It has a clutch size of approximately 5–11 eggs, which are greenish drab. The eggs measure 6–6.7 cm (2.4–2.6 in) in length and 4.2–4.6 cm (1.6–1.8 in) in width. The chicks are covered in down at hatching and able to leave the nest soon after. The canvasback sometimes lays its eggs in other canvasback nests and redheads often parasitize canvasback nests.

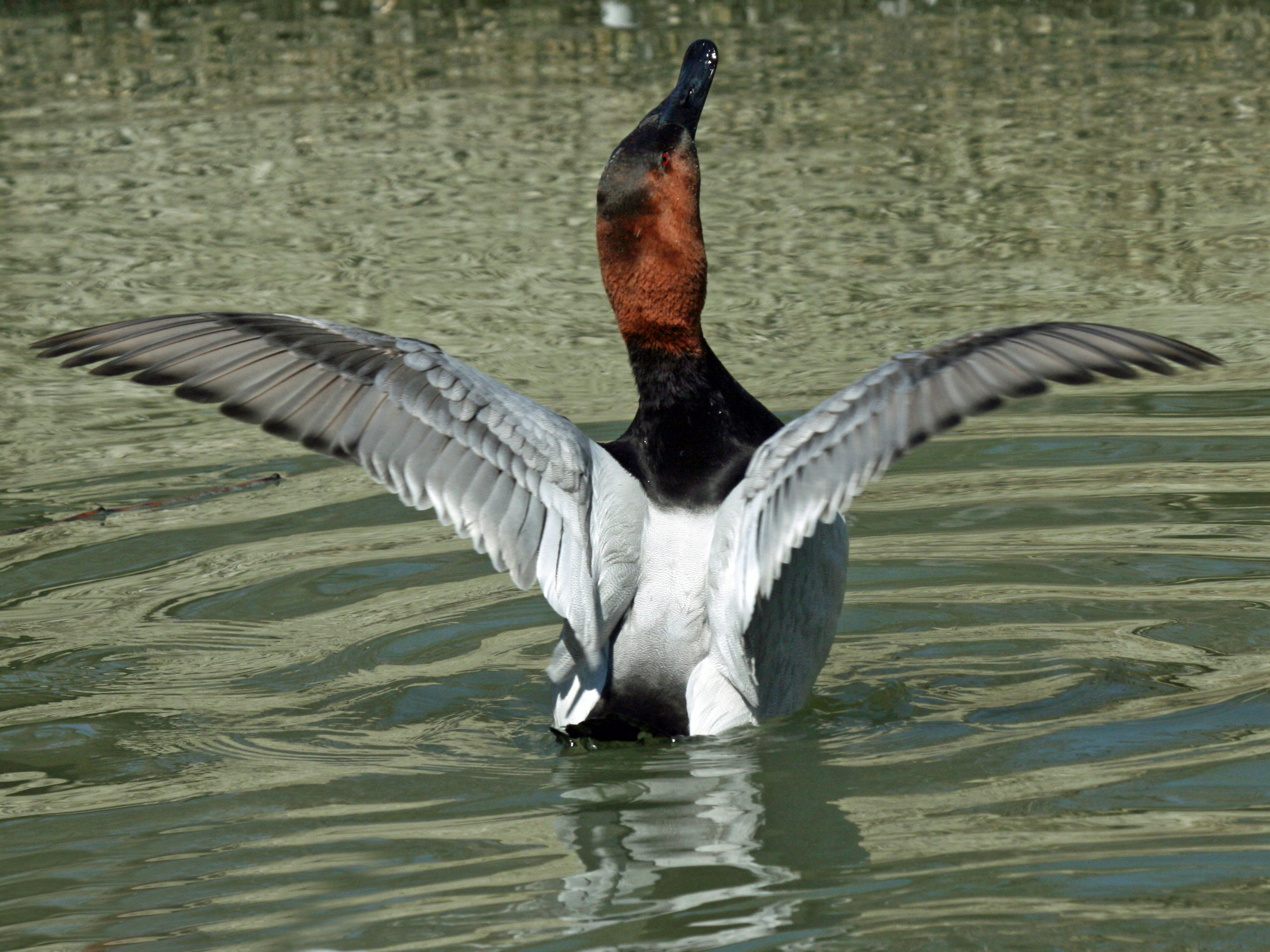
Drake canvasback stretching wings

== Migration ==
The canvasback migrates through the Mississippi Flyway to wintering grounds in the mid-Atlantic United States and the Lower Mississippi Alluvial Valley (LMAV), or the Pacific Flyway to wintering grounds along the coast of California. Historically, the Chesapeake Bay wintered the majority of canvasbacks, but with the recent loss of submerged aquatic vegetation (SAV) in the bay, their range has shifted south towards the LMAV. Brackish estuarine bays and marshes with abundant submergent vegetation and invertebrates are ideal wintering habitat for canvasbacks. A small number of birds are also known to have crossed the Atlantic, with several sightings being recorded in the United Kingdom. In December 1996, a canvasback was observed in a quarry in Kent, which was followed by an additional sighting in Norfolk in January 1997. At least five more sightings have since been confirmed in England.

== Diet ==
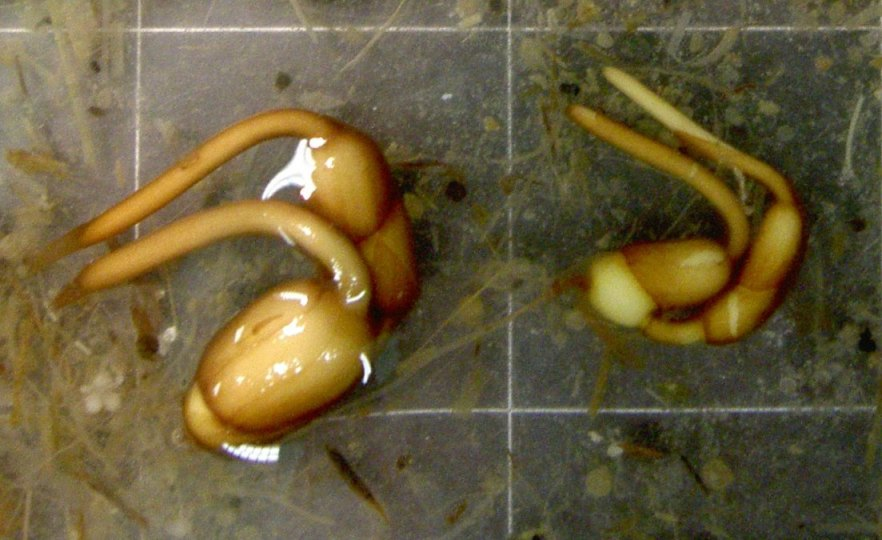
Tubers of Sago Pondweed (Stuckenia pectinata), a favorite food of the canvasback

The canvasback feeds mainly by diving, sometimes dabbling, mostly eating seeds, buds, leaves, tubers, roots, snails, and insect larvae. Besides its namesake, wild celery, the canvasback shows a preference for the tubers of sago pondweed, which can make up 100% of its diet at times. The canvasback has large webbed feet adapted for diving and its bill helps it dig tubers from the substrate. In the late 1930s, studies showed that four-fifths of the food eaten by canvasbacks was plant material.

Canvasback duck diving

In the early 1950s it was estimated that there were 225,000 canvasbacks wintering in the Chesapeake Bay; this represented one-half of the entire North American population. By 1985, there were only 50,000 ducks wintering there, or one-tenth of the population. Canvasbacks were extensively hunted around the start of the 20th century, but federal hunting regulations now restrict their harvest, so hunting is ruled out as a cause for the decline. Scientists have now concluded that the decline in duck populations was due to the decline in sub-aquatic vegetation acreage. Today the population has stabilized and is even increasing slightly, although it is nowhere near previous levels. Studies have now shown that by the 1970s four-fifths of the ducks' diet was made up of Baltic Clams, which are very common in the Chesapeake Bay: the ducks have been able to adapt to the decline in sub-aquatic vegetation by changing their diet. Redheads, which also feed on the tubers of sub-aquatic vegetation, have not been able to adapt, and their population remains low.

== Cuisine ==
Canvasback ducks were a particularly prestigious game dish in mid-19th-century America. They were rarely found on everyday menus, and often featured at banquets. They were generally sourced from Maryland and Chesapeake Bay, and their flavor was attributed to their diet of wild celery. By the end of the century, though, they had become "scarce, expensive, or unobtainable".

Edith Wharton refers to canvasback with blackcurrant sauce as an especially luxurious dinner served in New York City in the 1870s. Canvasback duck was a canonical element, along with Terrapin à la Maryland, of the elegant "Maryland Feast" menu, an "elite standard... that lasted for decades".

== Conservation ==
Populations have fluctuated widely. Low levels in the 1980s put the canvasback on lists of special concern, but numbers increased greatly in the 1990s. The canvasback is particularly vulnerable to drought and wetland drainage on the prairies of North America.

Many species of ducks, including the canvasback, are highly migratory, but are effectively conserved by protecting the places where they nest, even though they may be hunted away from their breeding grounds. Protecting key feeding and breeding grounds is key for conserving many types of migratory birds.
