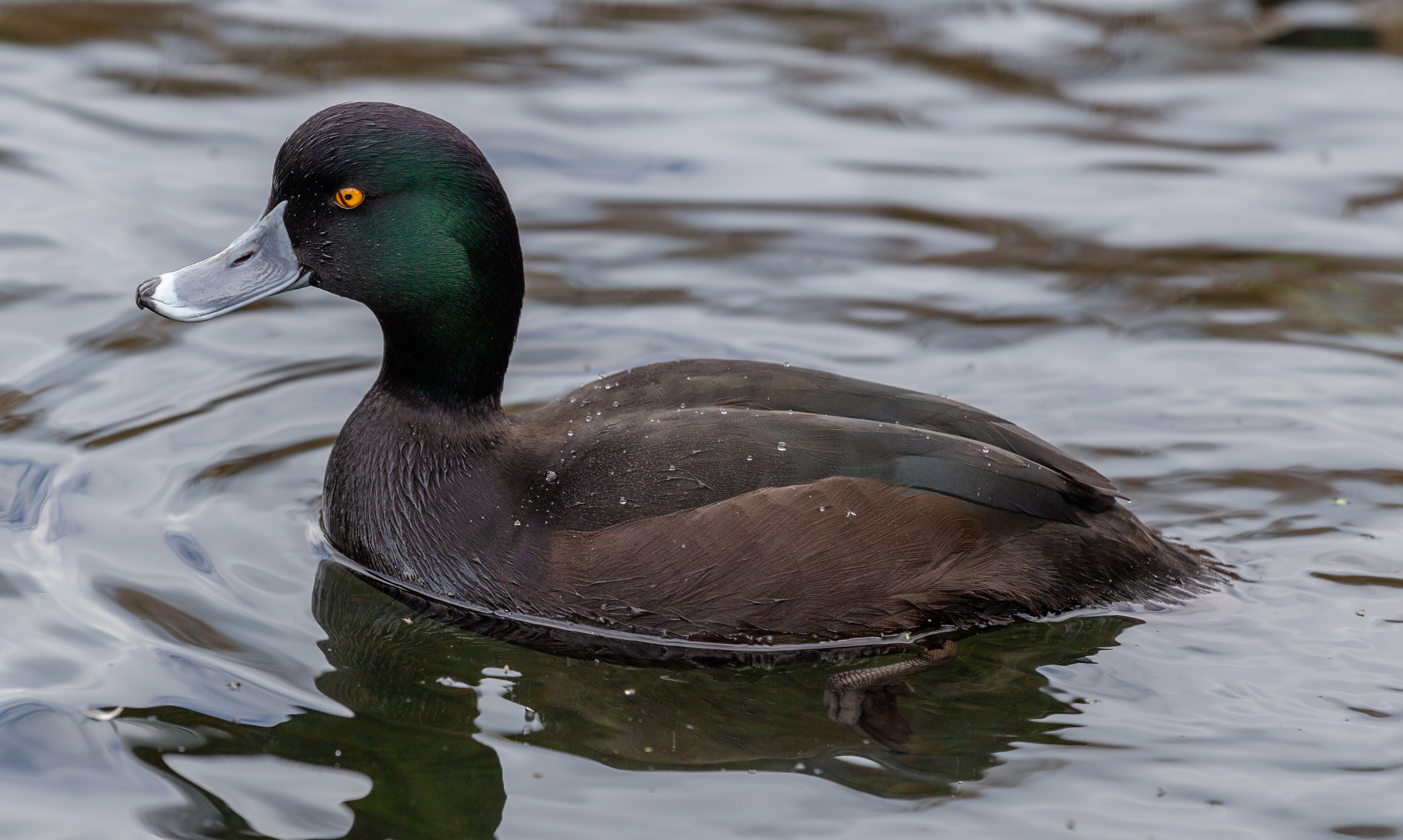
- Male
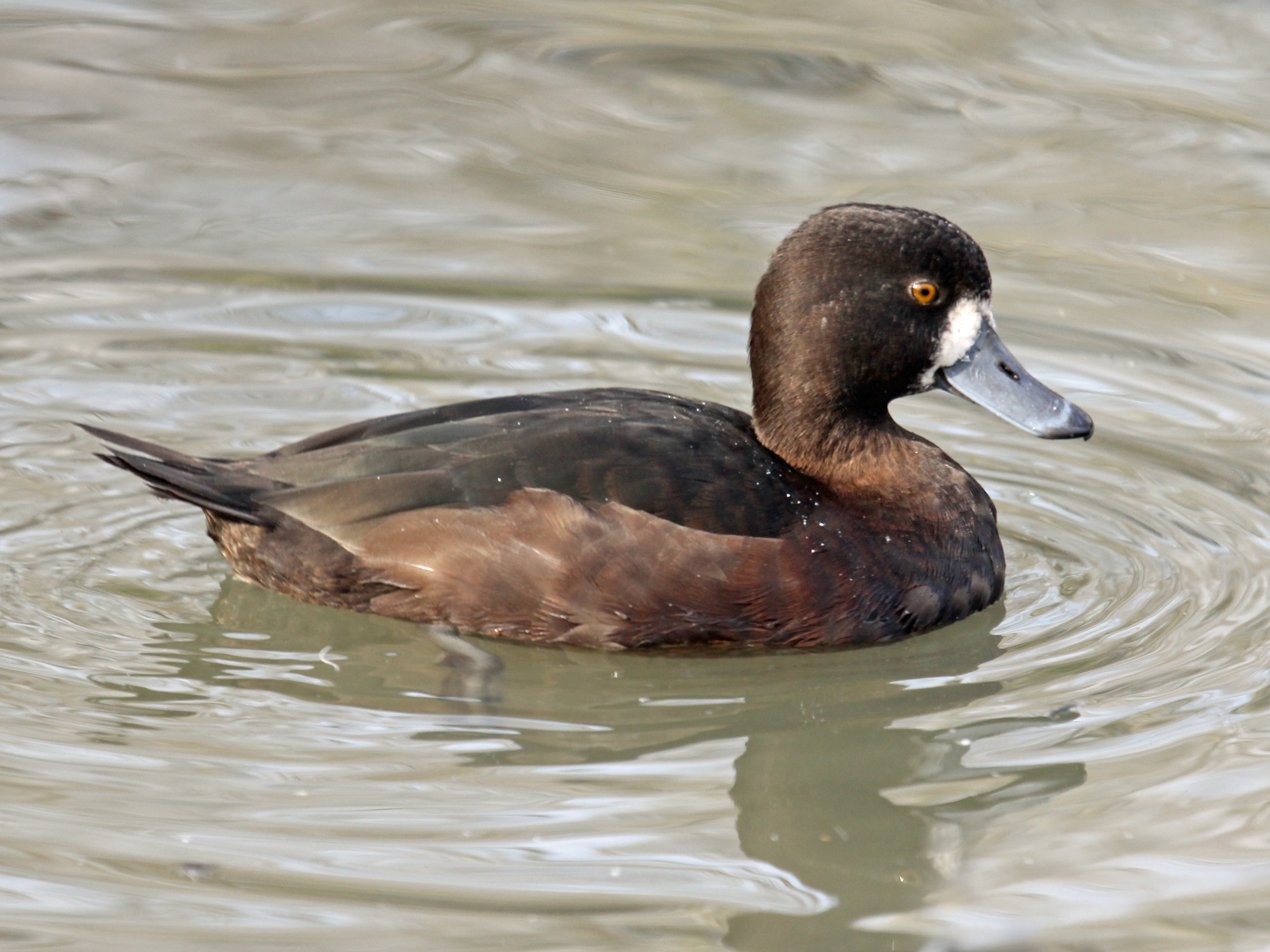
- Female

Conservation status
- Least Concern (IUCN 3.1)

Scientific classification
- Kingdom: Animalia
- Phylum: Chordata
- Class: Aves
- Order: Anseriformes
- Family: Anatidae
- Genus: Aythya
- Species: A. novaeseelandiae

Binomial name
- Aythya novaeseelandiae (Gmelin, 1789)
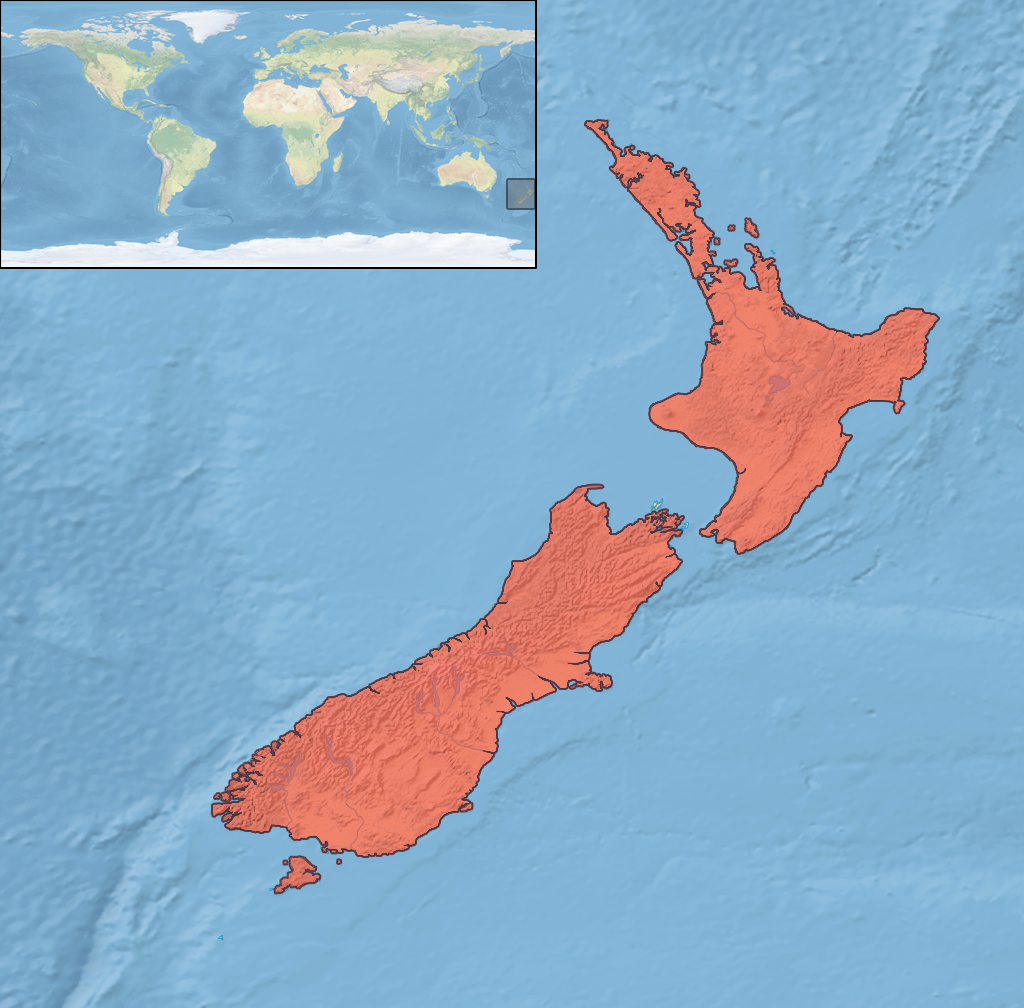
- Distribution map of the New Zealand scaup (red)

= New Zealand scaup =

Species of bird

The New Zealand scaup (Aythya novaeseelandiae), also known as the black teal (or pāpango and several other names in Māori), is a diving duck species of the genus Aythya endemic to New Zealand. They weigh around 650 grams (23 oz) and measure around 40 centimetres (16 in), and have dark-coloured plumage. They are found throughout New Zealand in deep natural and man-made lakes and ponds.

New Zealand scaup lay around 7 eggs and the ducklings are immediately capable of diving to feed. Adult scaups can dive to at least 3 metres and for as long as a minute for aquatic plants and invertebrates. Scaups started declining in the late 1800s until they were fully protected in 1934, and their population is now increasing thanks to predator control and new habitat.

== Taxonomy ==
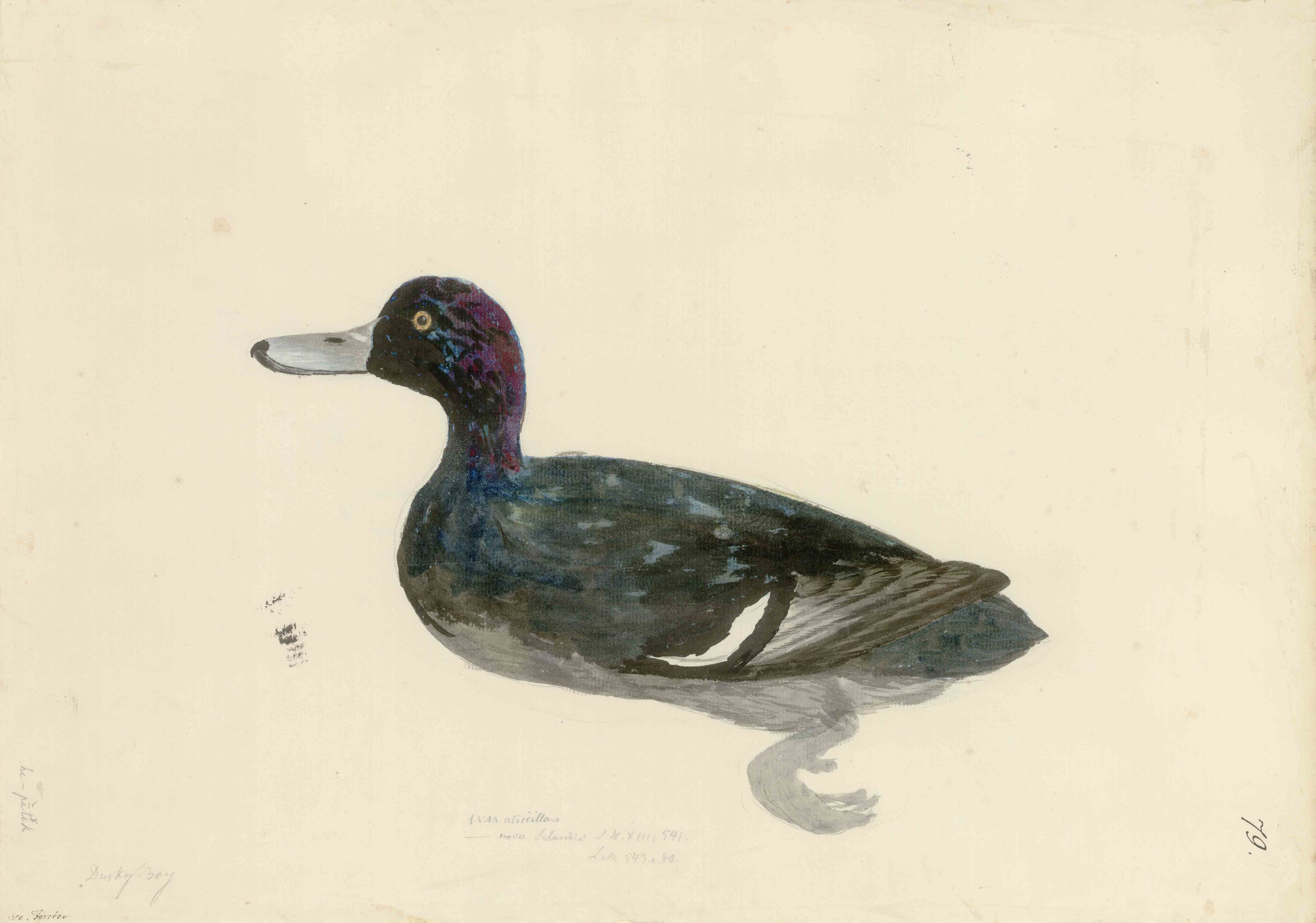
Watercolour of a male made by Georg Forster on James Cook's second voyage to the Pacific Ocean. This painting is the holotype for the species.

The New Zealand scaup was formally described in 1789 by the German naturalist Johann Friedrich Gmelin in his revised and expanded edition of Carl Linnaeus's Systema Naturae. He placed it with all the ducks, geese and swans in the genus Anas and coined the binomial name Anas novaeseelandiae. Gmelin based his description of the "New-Zealand duck" that had been described in 1785 by the English ornithologist John Latham in his A General Synopsis of Birds. The naturalist Joseph Banks had provided Latham with a water-colour drawing of the duck by Georg Forster who had accompanied James Cook on his second voyage to the Pacific Ocean. His picture of a male bird was drawn in April 1773 at Dusky Sound, a fiord on the southwest corner of New Zealand. This picture is the holotype for the species and is now held by the Natural History Museum in London. The New Zealand scaup is now placed with 11 other species in the genus Aythya that was introduced in 1822 by the German zoologist Friedrich Boie. The genus name Aythya comes from the Ancient Greek word αυθυια (authuia), which may have referred to a sea-dwelling duck. The species is monotypic: no subspecies are recognised.

== Description ==
The New Zealand scaup is a small, round-bodied diving duck that have dark plumage, but both sexes are easily distinguished. They have black legs and webbed feet for swimming, and they spend a lot of time underwater, where they can also travel considerable distances. They measure around 40 centimetres (16 in) in length and weigh around 695 grams (24.5 oz) for males, and around 610 grams (22 oz) for females.

The male has dark black-brown plumage with a striking yellow eye and a dark coloured (greenish) head. The female has duller chocolate brown plumage, brown eyes and has a white face patch during breeding season. A white wing bar can be seen in both sexes when in flight, and both sexes have a grey bill.

The young are initially covered in pale brown and white down, and juveniles look like the female, except with no white at the base of the bill.

The males have a high pitched whistle call and the females 'quack'.

== Distribution and habitat ==
They are found throughout both the North and South Island of New Zealand in deep freshwater lakes and ponds, and recently, hydroelectric lakes and oxidation ponds. Despite being widespread, they have a patchy distribution, and most scaups are on suitable habitat areas in Northland, the upper Waikato, Rotorua, Taupō, Hawke's Bay, West Coast, North Canterbury, and the Southern Alps. Unlike other members of this genus, the scaup is not migratory, although it does move to open water from high country lakes if they become frozen in winter. A recent population expansion has happened in Christchurch thanks to predator control and suitable habitat.

== Behaviour and ecology ==
New Zealand scaups are usually seen in flocks during autumn in winter, with flocks of over 200 birds seen at traditional moulting and wintering sites such as Lake Rotorua, Lake Taupō, Lake Tūtira, the Bromley sewage ponds, and the Ashburton Lakes.

=== Breeding ===
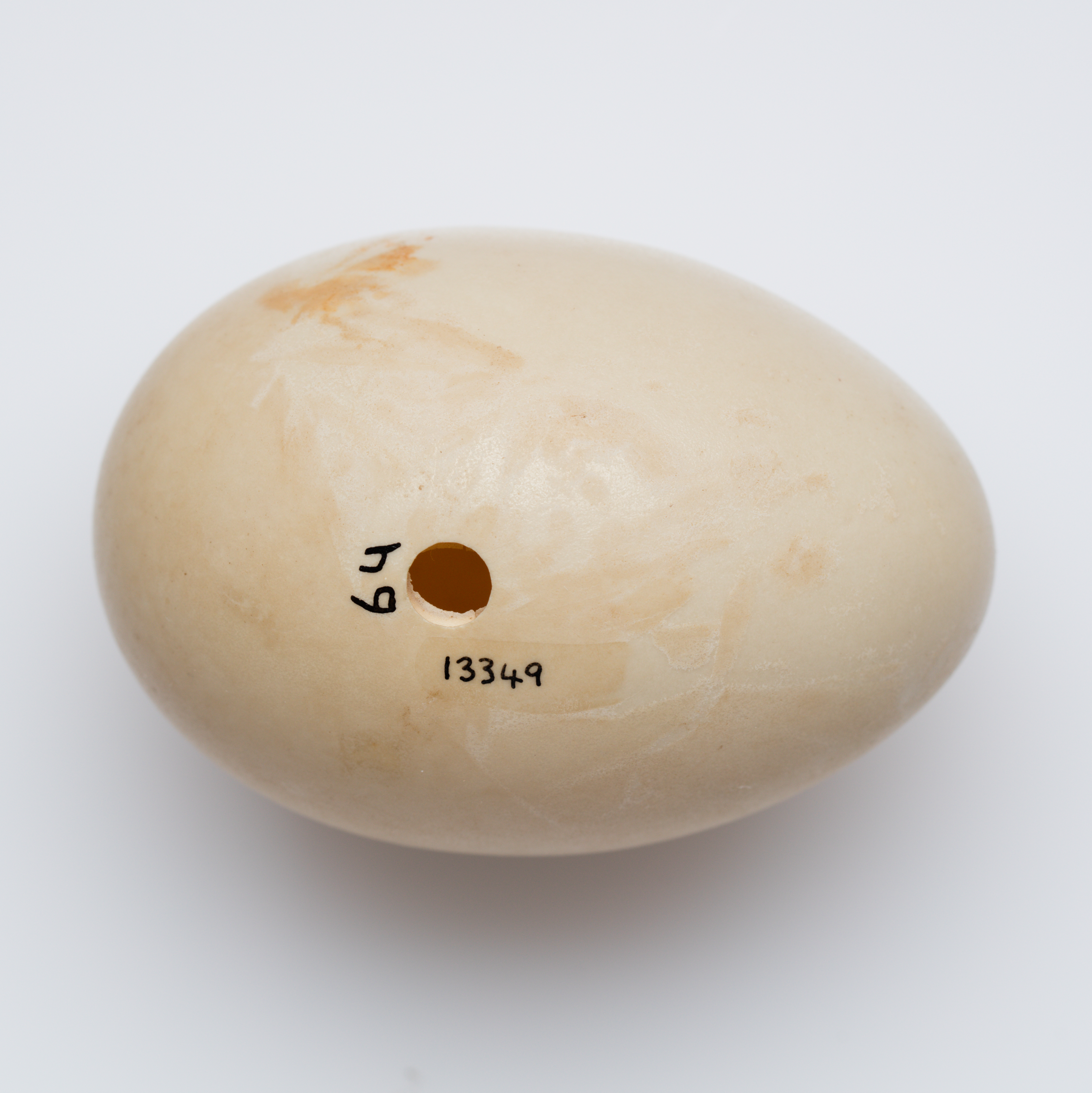
Aythya novaeseelandiae egg in the collection of Auckland Museum

New Zealand scaups typically leave their wintering flocks by September, and the males become territorial. The nest is a bowl of grass, sedges and other similar plants, lined with down, and in dense cover close to water. Sometimes scaups breed in loose colonies if suitable breeding habitat is scarce.

Egg laying mostly occurs from late October to December, but some late or replacement clutches are laid until February. The clutch of can contain 2–15 creamy-white coloured eggs, although the typical range is 6–8 eggs, and clutches of 12 eggs or more are probably laid by multiple female scaups. The eggs are around 65mm x 45mm (2.56in x 1.77in) in size, and weigh around 71 grams (2.5 oz). The eggs are laid in an interval of 1.2–1.4 days, and are incubated by the female for around 30 days.

The female broods the ducklings on the nest for up to 24 hours before leading the ducklings to water. The ducklings are immediately capable of diving to feed. The female guards the brood during the fledging period of around 75 days. Occasionally, rafts are formed by several females and their ducklings; these can have up to 50 birds.

Average and maximum lifespan, age at first breeding, and survival rate of fledglings is not known because few New Zealand scaups have been banded.

=== Feeding ===
New Zealand scaup with diving chicks

The New Zealand scaup is a diving duck which dives to look for aquatic plants, small fish, water snails, mussels and insects. It is sometimes seen with the Australian coot (Fulica atra); it is thought that the scaup takes advantage of the food stirred up by the coots as they fossick for shrimps. Scaups dive to at least 3 metres, but probably dive much deeper. Most dives last 15–20 seconds, but some dives last for over a minute.

== Threats and conservation ==
During the late 1800s and early 1900s, New Zealand scaup populations declined due to habitat destruction, introduction of predators and duck hunting. Adults and ducklings are vulnerable to predation during nesting and chick-rearing which may result in low breeding success.

New Zealand scaups started recovering after they were partially protected in 1921 and fully protected in 1934. Predator control and new breeding and feeding habitat has allowed the scaup population to increase, especially in Christchurch, where scaups have recolonised the area.

The last time the population of the New Zealand scaup was assessed in the 1990s, the population was estimated to be around 20,000; the population has most likely increased since then.

== Gallery ==
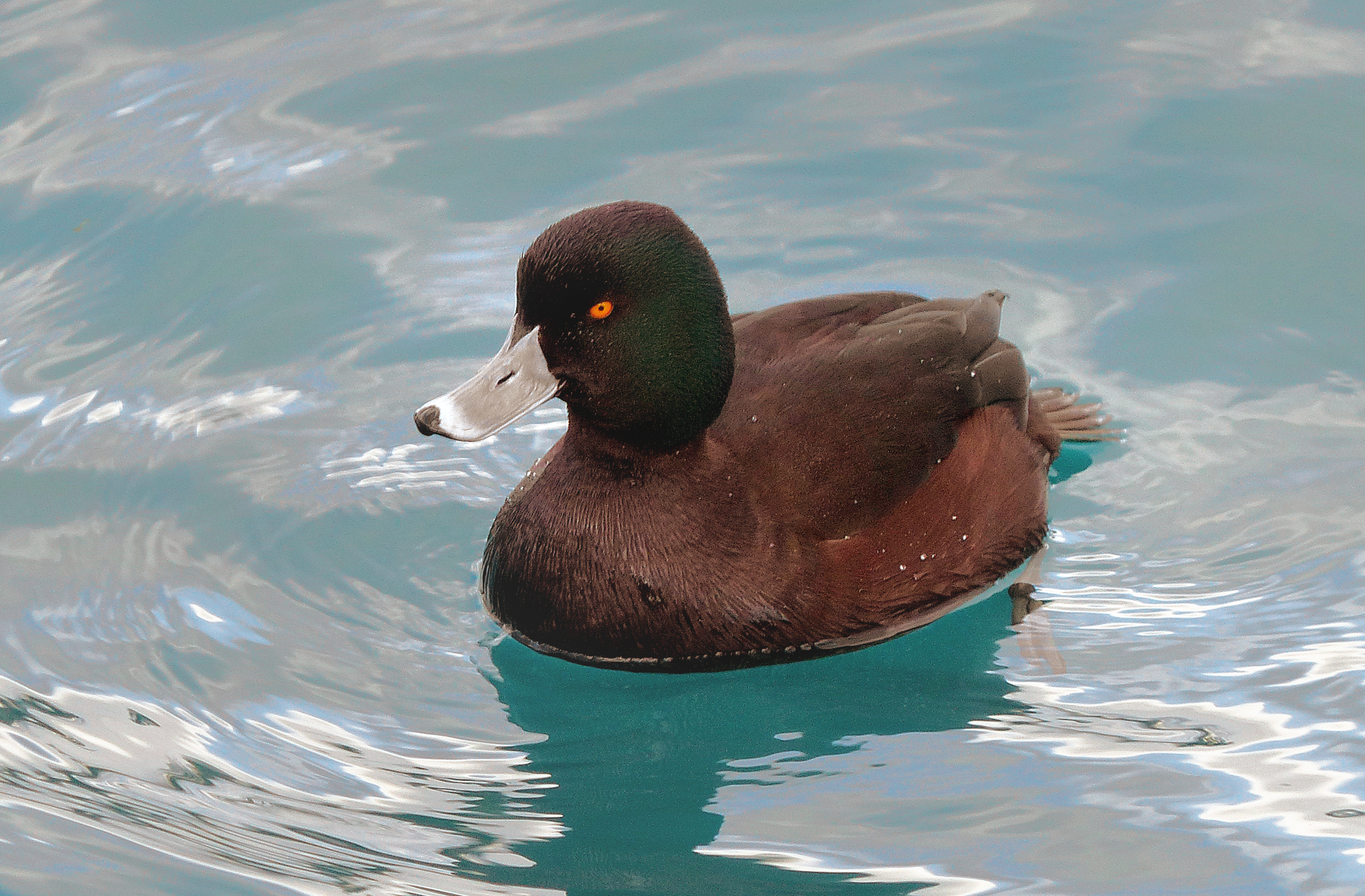
Male

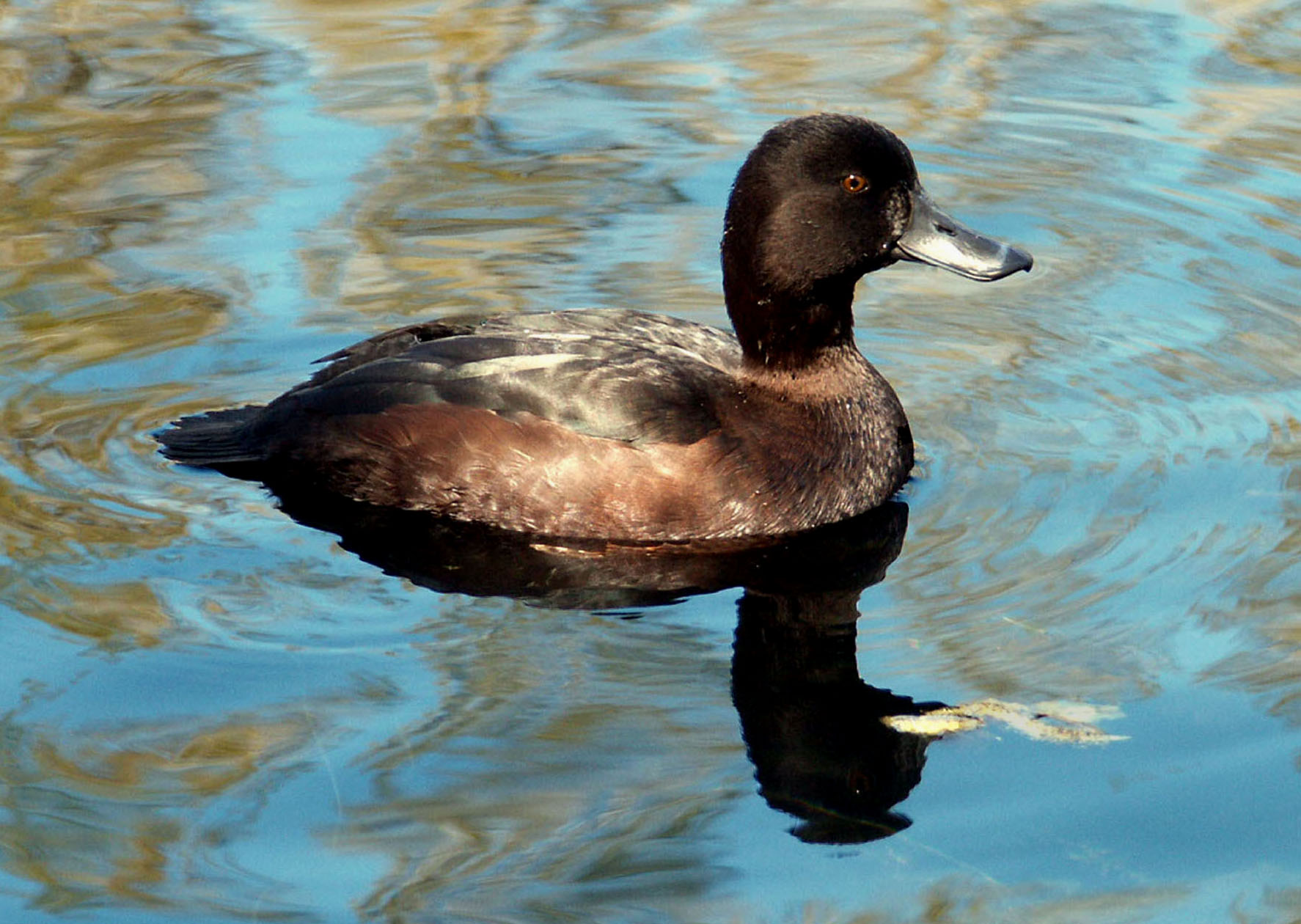
Female

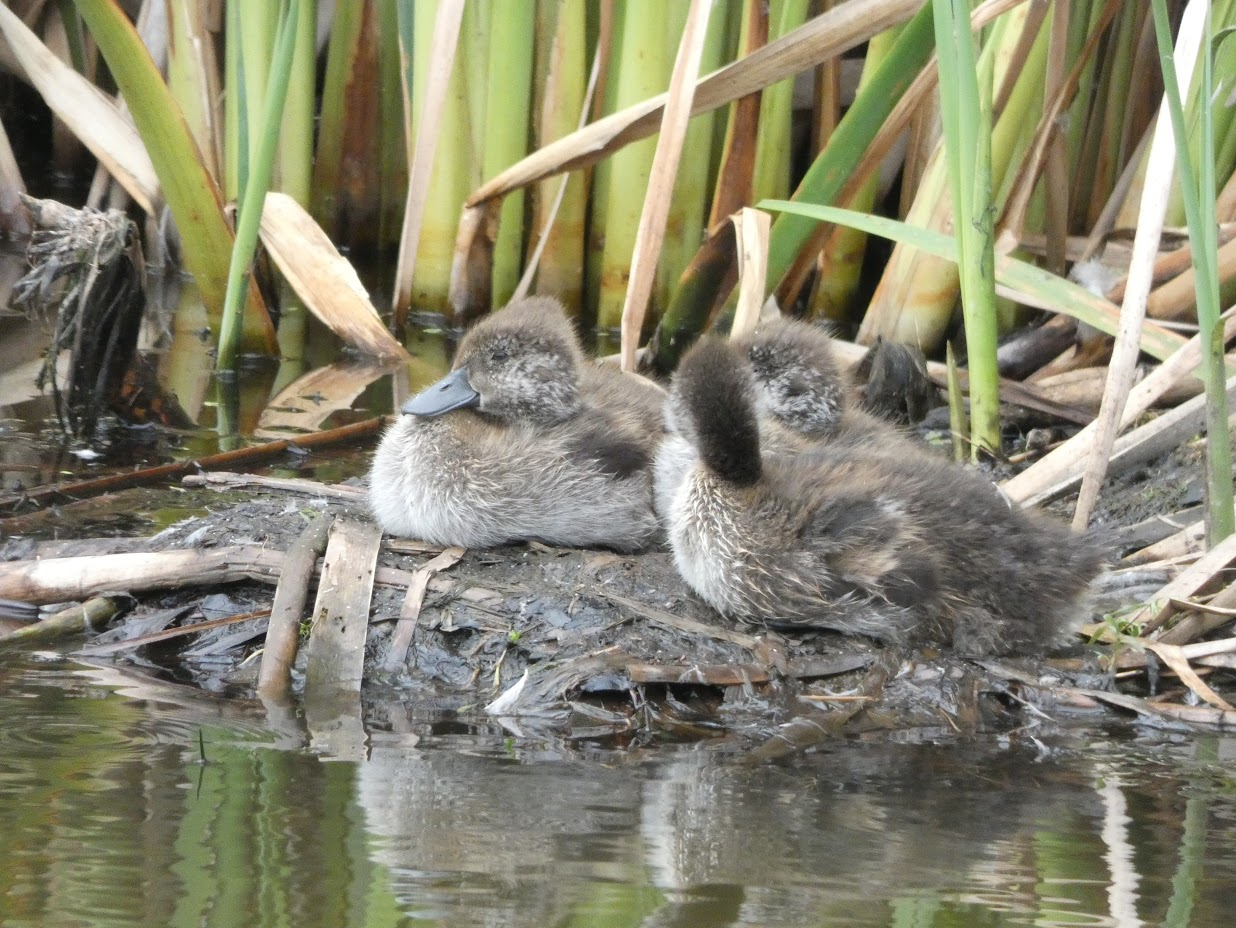
Ducklings
