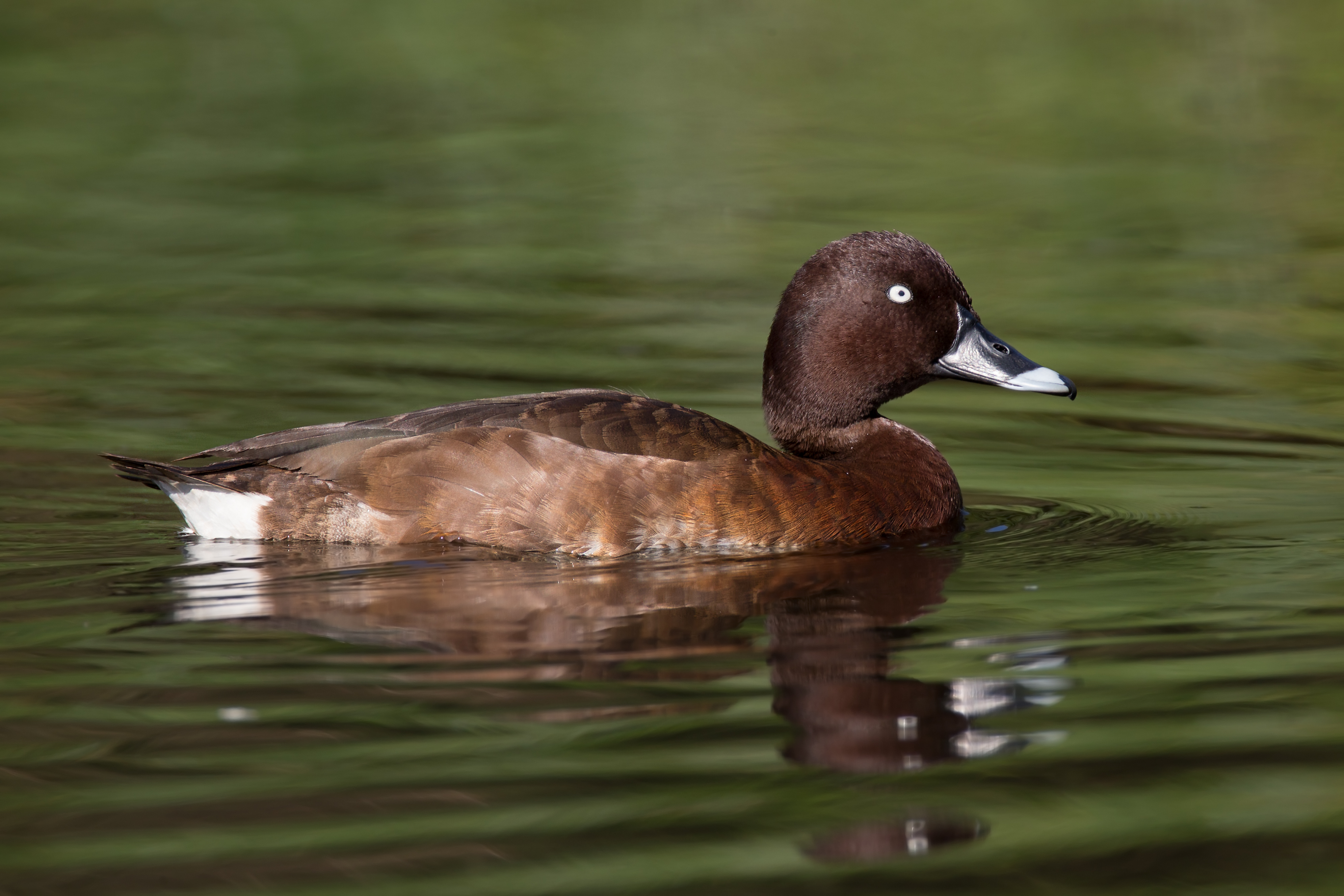
- Male
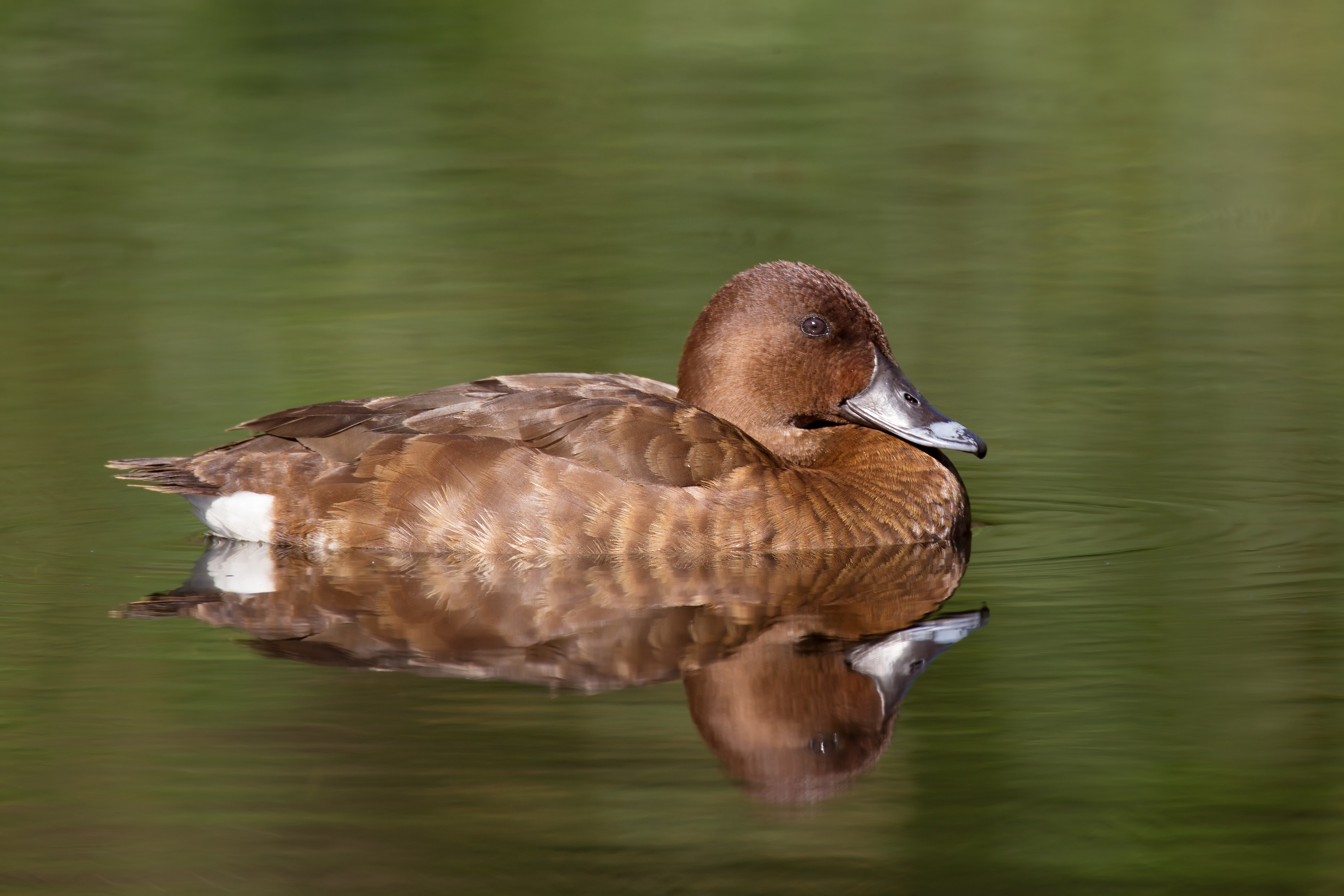
- Female

Conservation status
- Least Concern (IUCN 3.1)

Scientific classification
- Kingdom: Animalia
- Phylum: Chordata
- Class: Aves
- Order: Anseriformes
- Family: Anatidae
- Genus: Aythya
- Species: A. australis

Binomial name
- Aythya australis (Eyton, 1838)

Subspecies
- A. a. extima (Mayr, 1940) (disputed); A. a. australis (Eyton, 1838)
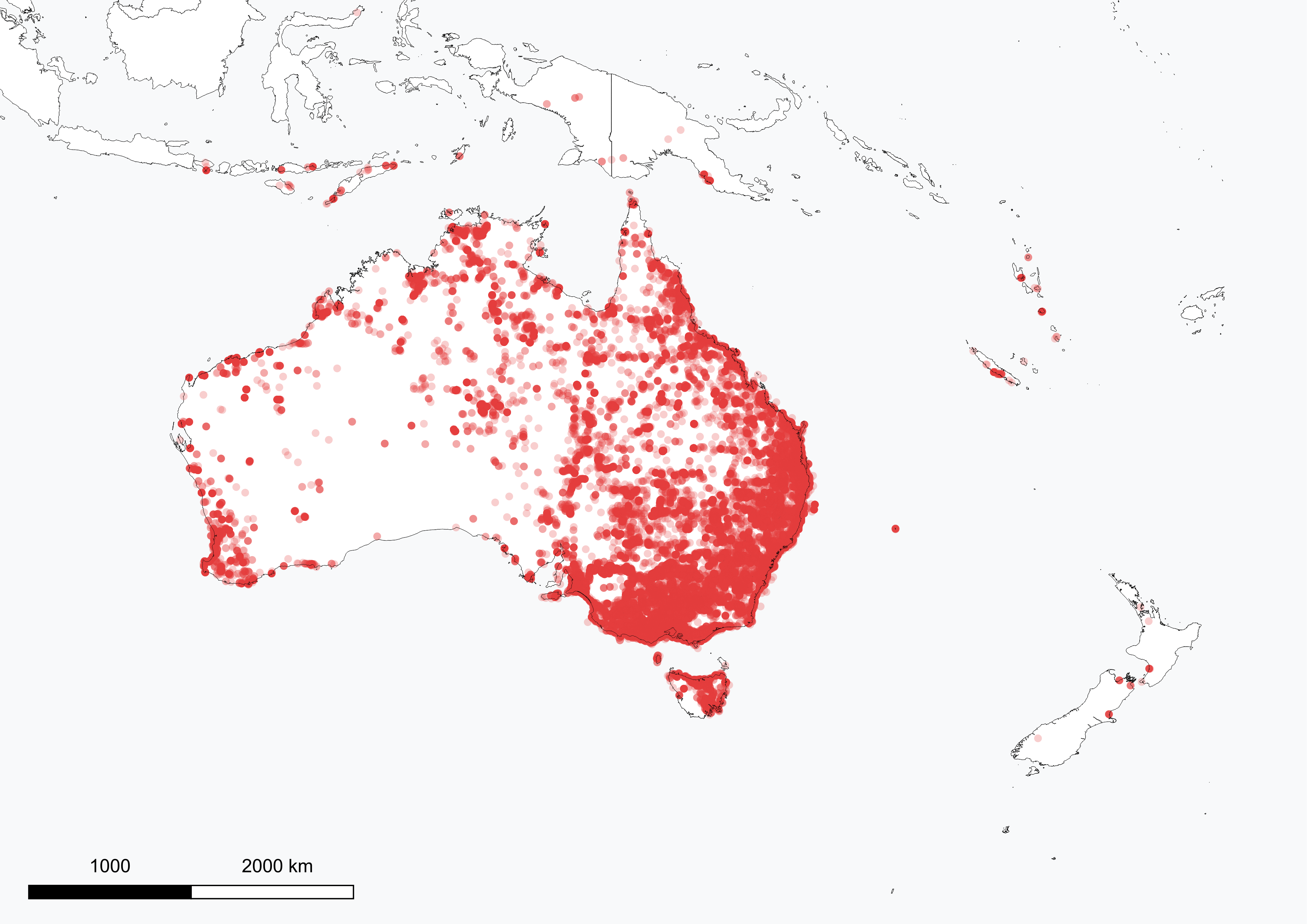
- Species distribution

Synonyms
- Nyroca australis Eyton, 1838

= Hardhead =

Species of duck

The hardhead (Aythya australis), also known as the white-eyed duck, is the only true diving duck found in Australia. The common name "hardhead" has nothing to do with the density of the bird's skull, instead referring to the difficulty encountered by early taxidermists in processing the head. Hardheads are found in wetter, coastal regions of Australia, particularly in the south-east, but are known to disperse as far afield as New Guinea, New Zealand, and the Pacific Islands.

== Description ==
Hardheads are smaller than most ducks, with body length typically between 42–59 cm (17–23 in). Both sexes are similar in size, ranging 525–1,100 g (18.5–38.8 oz) with wingspans of 65–70 cm (26–28 in). Both male and female are a fairly uniform chocolate-brown above, with rufous flanks and white undersides (which are often not visible if the duck is in the water). The trailing edges and almost the entire underside of the wings are white. In the male, the eyes are a striking white, in the female, brown.

== Distribution and habitat ==
Hardheads are common in the south-east of Australia, particularly in the Murray-Darling Basin, but also in the wetter country near the coasts. They are moderately nomadic in normal years, but disperse widely in times of drought. Significant numbers reach as far afield as New Guinea, New Zealand, and the islands of the Pacific, where they can remain for some time, even breeding for a season or two.

Hardheads prefer larger lakes, swamps and rivers with deep, still water, but are often seen in smaller streams, flooded grasslands, and shallow pools. As a general rule, they avoid coastal waters. They rarely come to land and never perch in trees.

Widespread throughout its large range, the hardhead is evaluated as Least Concern on the IUCN Red List of Threatened Species.

== Behaviour ==
Like the other members of the pochard group, hardheads feed by diving deeply, often staying submerged for as long as a minute at a time. They slip under the water with barely a ripple, simply lowering their heads and thrusting with their powerful webbed feet. They eat a broad range of small aquatic creatures, and supplement this with water weeds.

Hardheads are usually silent, but males have a soft, wheezy whistle and 'whirr'. Females have a loud rattling 'gaark' call.

== Gallery ==
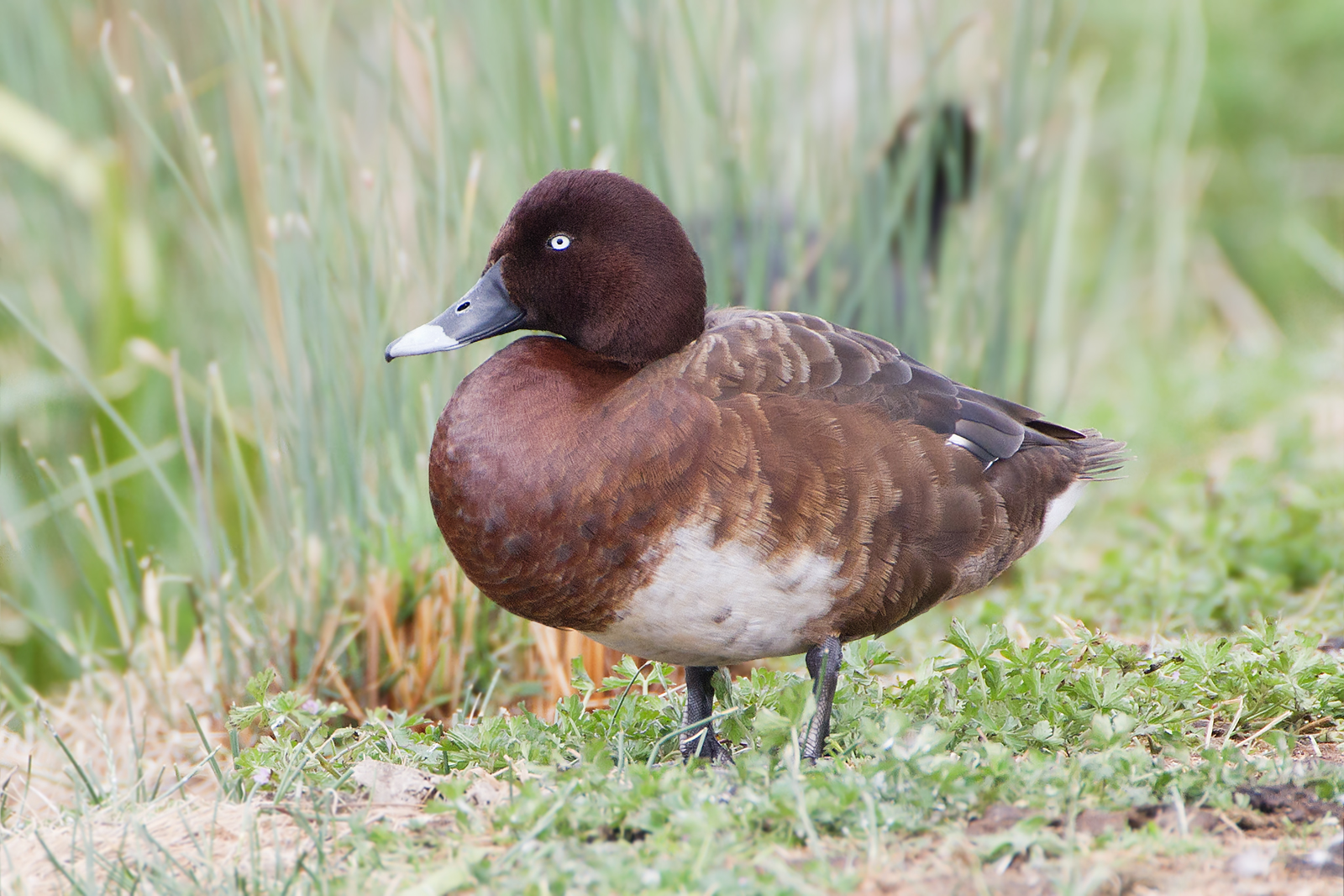
Standing male

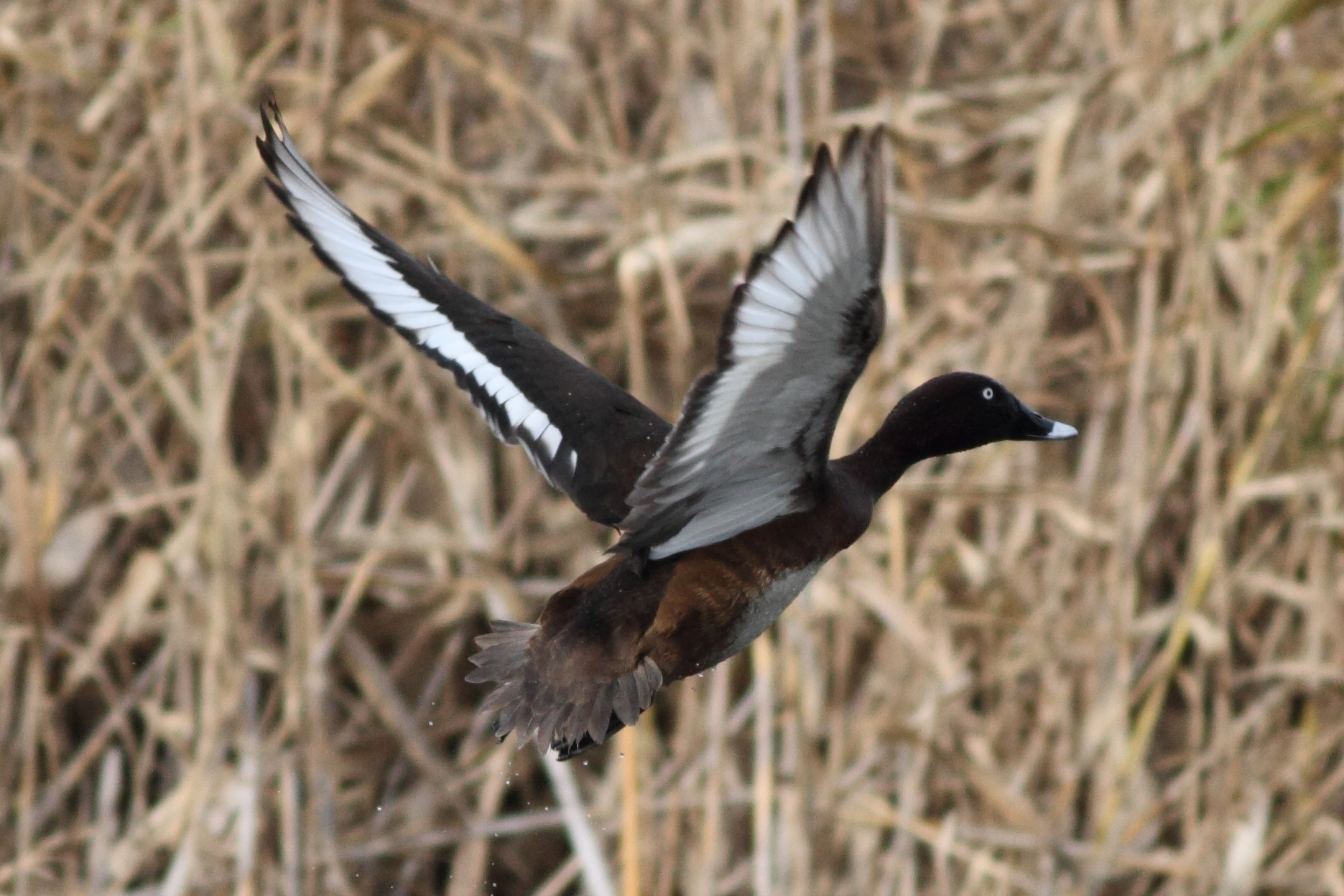
Male in flight
