= Pochard =

Pochard is a common name used for several species of diving ducks:

- Four species in the genus Aythya:
  - Common pochard, Aythya ferina
  - Baer's pochard, Aythya baeri
  - Ferruginous pochard, Aythya nyroca
  - Madagascar pochard, Aythya innotata
- Three species in the genus Netta:
  - Red-crested pochard, Netta rufina
  - Rosy-billed pochard or Rosybill, Netta peposaca
  - Southern pochard, Netta erythrophthalma
