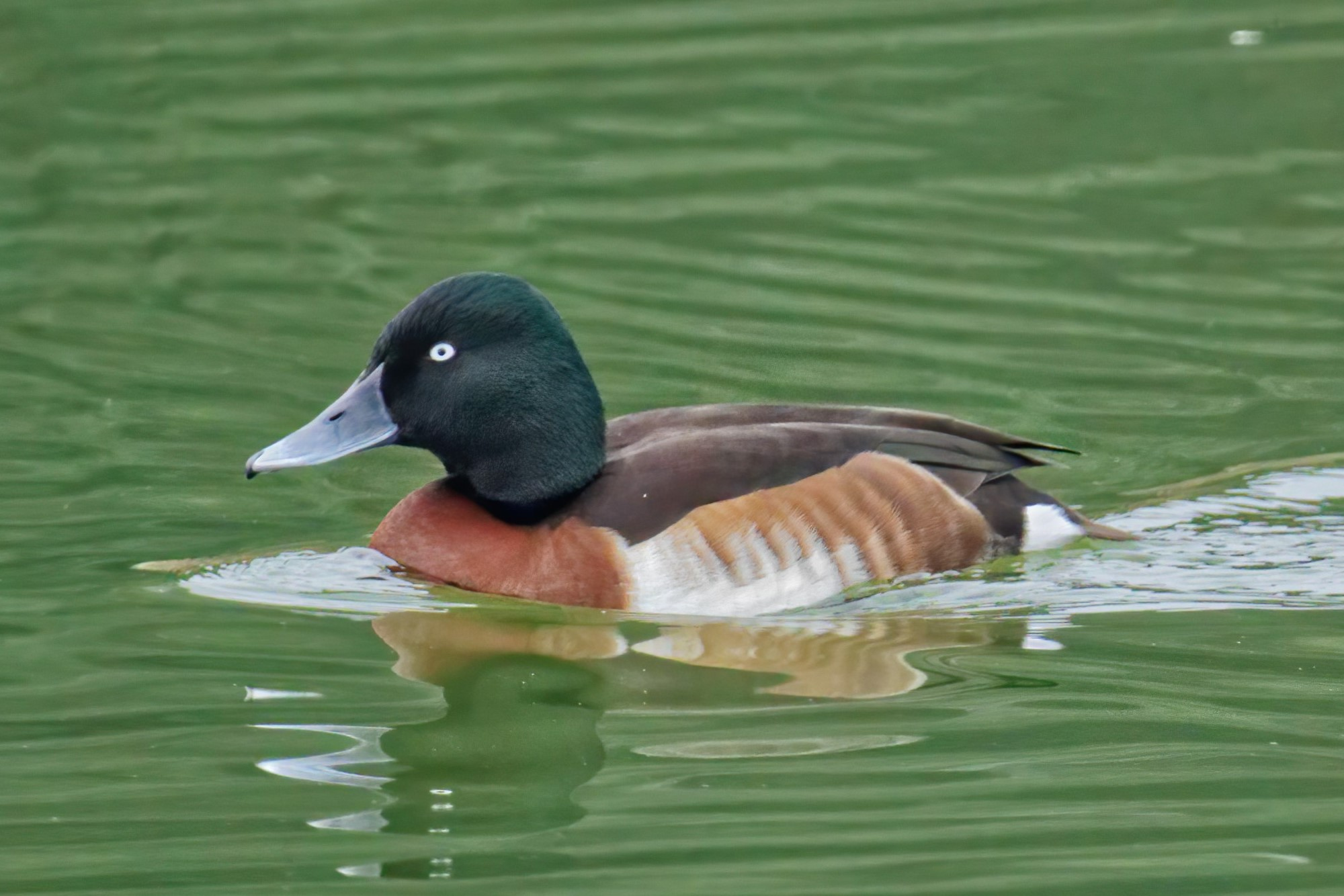
- Male (wintering)
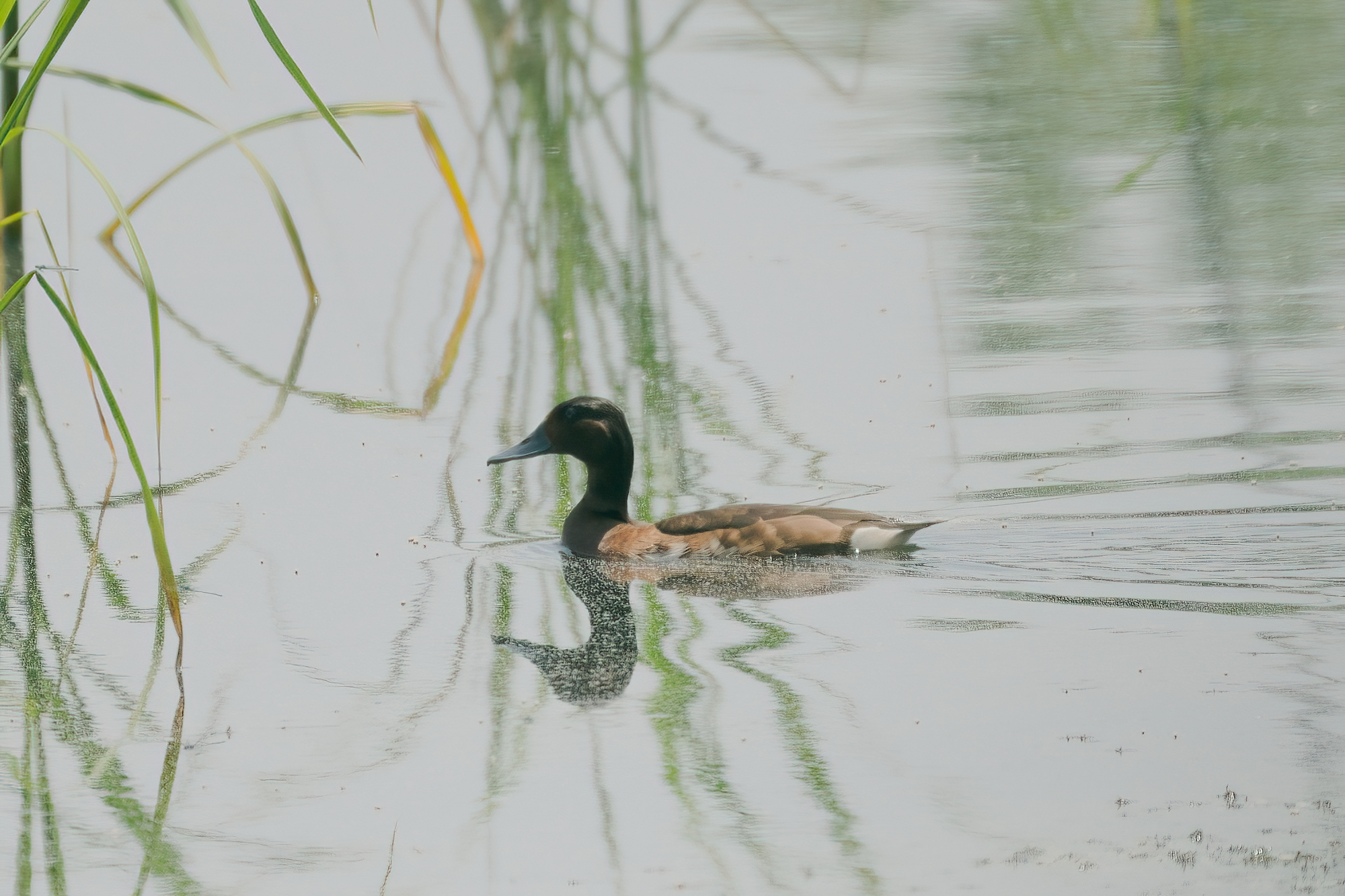
- Female (breeding)

Conservation status
- Critically Endangered (IUCN 3.1)

Scientific classification
- Kingdom: Animalia
- Phylum: Chordata
- Class: Aves
- Order: Anseriformes
- Family: Anatidae
- Genus: Aythya
- Species: A. baeri

Binomial name
- Aythya baeri (Radde, 1863)
- Resident Breeding season Passage Non-breeding season

Synonyms
- List: Anas leucophthalmos Kittlitz, 1829; Anas (Fuligula) baeri Radde, 1863; Aythya ferina Swinhoe, 1871; Fulix baeri Swinhoe, 1871; Fulix cristata G. R. Gray, 1871; Fuligula nyroca David, 1871; Fuligula baeri Dybowski, 1874; Fulix nyroca David and Oustalet, 1877; Nyroca ferruginea Blakiston and Pryer, 1882; Fuligula baueri Tristram, 1889; Nyroca baeri Salvadori, 1895

= Baer's pochard =

Species of bird

Baer's pochard (Aythya baeri) is a diving duck found in eastern Asia. It is a resident bird in North and Central China, and formerly bred in southeast Russia and Northeast China, migrating in winter to southern China, Vietnam, Japan, and India. Baer's pochard is a monotypic species. The holotype was collected in middle Amur.

It has a distinctive black head and neck with green gloss. While in poor light, it is likely to look completely black. It is similar and closely related to the ferruginous duck, and they were previously considered to be a single species; Baer's pochard is differentiated by its white flanks when floating on the water, as well as its longer, more rounded head and larger size.

Its breeding season varies by latitude and environment. The nest, built from sedges, reeds and other plants, is placed among emergent vegetation, usually in shallow water or on small islands or ridges. Its clutch size ranges from 5 to 14. Males usually take on sentry duty, and females take on the responsibility of incubating.

Baer's pochard was once a common species in its range, but is now very rare. The number of mature individuals may be fewer than 1,000, and its population is still declining. Hunting and habitat loss are considered to be the main reasons. This species has been classified as critically endangered by the IUCN, and listed as a first-class protected animal in China.

== Taxonomy ==
Baer's pochard was first scientifically described in 1863 as Anas baeri by Gustav Radde in his book Reisen im Süden von Ost-Sibirien. The epithet and English common name commemorate the Baltic German naturalist Karl Ernst von Baer. It is also called eastern white-eye, Siberian white-eye, Baer's white-eye and green-headed pochard. The holotype was collected from a small flock in middle Amur during the breeding season. In 1929, when British ornithologist E. C. Stuart Baker studied the birds of British India, he treated Baer's pochard and ferruginous duck as conspecific. However, Chinese ornithologist Tso-hsin Cheng treated them as two distinct species, as they had breeding grounds which did not overlap, and he had seen no evidence of hybridisation. (Note: In fact, hybridisation between Baer's pochard and ferruginous duck has been documented in captivity and natural hybridisation also likely occurs (at least in modern times); see: Biological interaction.) While the species was long thought to have arisen from eastern populations of the ferruginous duck, American ornithologist Paul Johnsgard says its behaviors suggest it may instead be more closely related to the hardhead.

American ornithologist Bradley Curtis Livezey published a phylogenetic study based on morphological data in 1996, in which he proposed his view on the relationship among Tribe Aythyini. Baer's pochard, ferruginous duck, hardhead and Madagascar pochard are classified in subgenus Nyroca (the "white-eyes"), intrasubgenus relationship is unclear, but the ferruginous duck was suggested to be the sister group of Baer's pochard. The subgenus Aythya (the "scaup", including New Zealand Scaup, ring-necked duck, tufted duck, greater scaup and lesser scaup) is the sister group of subgenus Nyroca. The subgenus Aristonetta (the "redheads", including the common pochard, canvasback and redhead) is the sister group of all other pochards.

Two molecular phylogenetic studies on Anseriformes or Anatidae were published in 2000s, some mitochondrial genes were sequenced, but Baer's pochard was absent in both of them. The mitochondrial genome of Baer's pochard was sequenced and published in 2021. Molecular phylogenetic studies determined the relationships among Baer's pochard and other closely related species:

- Tribe. Aythyini
  - - Aythya
      - Baer's pochard Aythya baeri
      - - Tufted Duck A. fuligula
        - - Common pochard A. ferina
          - Redhead A. americana
    - Netta
      Red-crested pochard Netta rufina
  - Asarcornis
    White-winged duck Asarcornis scutulata

== Description ==
The Baer's pochard is 41–47 cm (16–19 in) long with a 70–79 cm (28–31 in) wingspan. The male is slightly larger, weighing on average 500–730 g (18–26 oz), wings lengthed 18.6–20.3 cm (7.3–8.0 in), tail at 53–60 mm (2.1–2.4 in), and culmen at 38–44 mm (1.5–1.7 in). Relatively, the female weighing on average 590–655 g (20.8–23.1 oz), wings lengthed 19.1–20.5 cm (7.5–8.1 in), tail at 51–64 mm (2.0–2.5 in), and culmen at 40–44 mm (1.6–1.7 in). Both male and female's tarsometatarsus lengthed 33–34.7 mm (1.30–1.37 in).

Breeding male has a black head and neck with green gloss, white or paler yellow eyes, blackish-brown back, dark chestnut breast, white or light chestnut flanks and a short and low tail. While it is likely to look completely black in poor light. Female has brown eyes and a dark brown head and neck that blend into the chestnut-brown breast and flanks. Eclipse and first-winter male resembles female, but retain the white eyes. Both male and female have wide white speculum feathers, white vent-side, dark-grey bill, black nail and dark-grey tarsometatarsus.

It is similar to its close relative, the ferruginous duck (A. nyroca), both have white vent-side and iris in males, black nail, and wide white speculum feathers. Although Baer's pochard is bigger, has a longer head, body and bill. Unlike the ferruginous duck's tall and triangular head, Baer's pochard has a more rounded head and a flatter forehead. The white part on the belly extends to its flanks in Baer's pochard, which is visible when floating on the water, while the ferruginous duck has a smaller white part on its belly. The female Baer's pochard has a distinctly bright chestnut spot at the lore, which is absent in ferruginous duck.

Baer's pochard is usually a quieter duck, but during its courtship display, both sexes give harsh graaaak. Females may give kura kura kura and males may give kuro kuro at other times.

== Distribution ==
Baer's pochard traditionally bred in the Amur and Ussuri basins in Northeast China and the southeastern Russian Far East. In recent years, it has also colonised North China and Central China. It winters in most areas south of the Yellow River in China, Taiwan, Japan, Bangladesh, India, North Korea, Laos, Myanmar, Nepal, Thailand and Vietnam, and occasionally appears in Bhutan, South Korea, Philippines or Pakistan as a rare vagrant. It leaves its wintering grounds by mid-March and returns to them by mid-October or early November.

The species has become extremely rare in its traditional breeding areas, and since 2010, there have been no confirmed breeding reports in all sites north of Beijing. However, the numbers recorded during the breeding season are smaller than those recorded in winter, so there may still be unknown breeding sites. For example, there are some doubtful breeding reports in the Chinese part of Lake Khanka, the Russian part of Lake Khasan, and the Muraviovka Park. Since 2012, new breeding sites have been discovered in several provinces of China, including Hebei, Hubei and Jiangxi; the latter two cities are far from traditional breeding sites in the Amur and Ussuri basins. In these new breeding areas, warmer climate conditions provide a longer breeding season (about twice as long as in the Amur and Ussuri basins) which allows birds to lay a replacement clutch if their first clutch fails. Baer's pochard is no longer migratory in central and eastern China.

The wintering grounds have also contracted significantly in recent years. Since at least the winter of 2010–2011, Baer's pochard no longer winters in any site outside mainland China, except as a vagrant. In its wintering grounds in mainland China, the population has also declined severely, by more than 99%. (Note: See the Threats and protection section for more details about its history in different regions.)

== Behaviour and ecology ==
Baer's pochard is a shy species, that inhabit open, slow-flowing lakes, swamps and ponds. It breeds around lakes with rich aquatic vegetation, nesting in dense grass, flooded tussock meadows, or flooded shrubby meadows. In winter, it forms large flocks on large and open freshwater lakes and reservoirs with other pochards. It has strong wings, and can flyor walk at high speeds. It is also good at diving and swimming, and can quickly take off from the water when threatened or disturbed. In migrating season, they form small groups of more than 10 or dozens of birds, flying at low altitudes in wedge-shaped formations. During winter, Baer's pochard sleeps during the day, leaves for unknown feeding sites with other ducks in the dusk, and returns before dawn. Little is known about their diet beyond aquatic plants, grass seeds and molluscs.

=== Breeding ===
Baer's pochard appears to have a monogamous mating system, at least within a breeding season. In traditional breeding grounds in northeastern China, Baer's pochard gathers in gaps in the ice before it completely thawed. After the ice season, it gathers on the large, open lakes. They breed from mid-to-late May. While in Fuhe Wetland in Wuhan, Hubei, Baer's pochard gathers in large groups on the open lakes before breeding season. It is divided into small groups in mid-April, in which they will courting and mating. During courtship, the male swims around the female, repeatedly nods his head up and down. When other males approach, it swims toward them quickly to drive them away, but there is no violent fight between them. The female also nods her head in response. When the male approaches, the female straightens her neck and lowers her head to the water. He then climbs onto her body and bites her nape feathers to mate. After the mating, the male and female leave the flock for nesting.

Baer's pochard's nest is circular cylindrical, located among emergent vegetation, usually in shallow water or on small islands or ridges. The nest is made of sedges, reeds and other plants collected from the immediate vicinity, lined with a layer of down. Its clutch ranged from 5 to 14, with an average of 9.7. Males usually take on sentry duty at about 10 meters from the nest during hatching. Females leave the nest to forage 2–3 times a day, usually during 6:00-20:00, and lasted for 27–240 min. They cover the eggs with nest materials during forging, and place them onto their back when coming back. If water levels are elevated by heavy rainfall or human activity, females increase the height of the nest to avoid flooding. During the hottest days, females often stand on the nest and shelter eggs from the strong sunlight, whilst allowing circulation of air around them. Females also take water into their plumage and use it to cool the eggs. The incubation lasted for 23–26 days.

Studies have shown that the nest survival rate (Note: Proportion of nests with at least one young fledged.) of Baer's pochards is about 14–45%, and each clutch may lose one to nine eggs. About 20-30% of eggs hatched successfully, and 3–16 young fledged per nest. There are three major reasons contributing to the failure, including nest desertion (abandoned by parents), nest predation (mainly by Siberian Weasels) and flooding. The proportion of these causes varies among years. In addition, most of the breeding sites in Wuhan are crayfish farms, the farming work and eggs collection may also be hindrances.

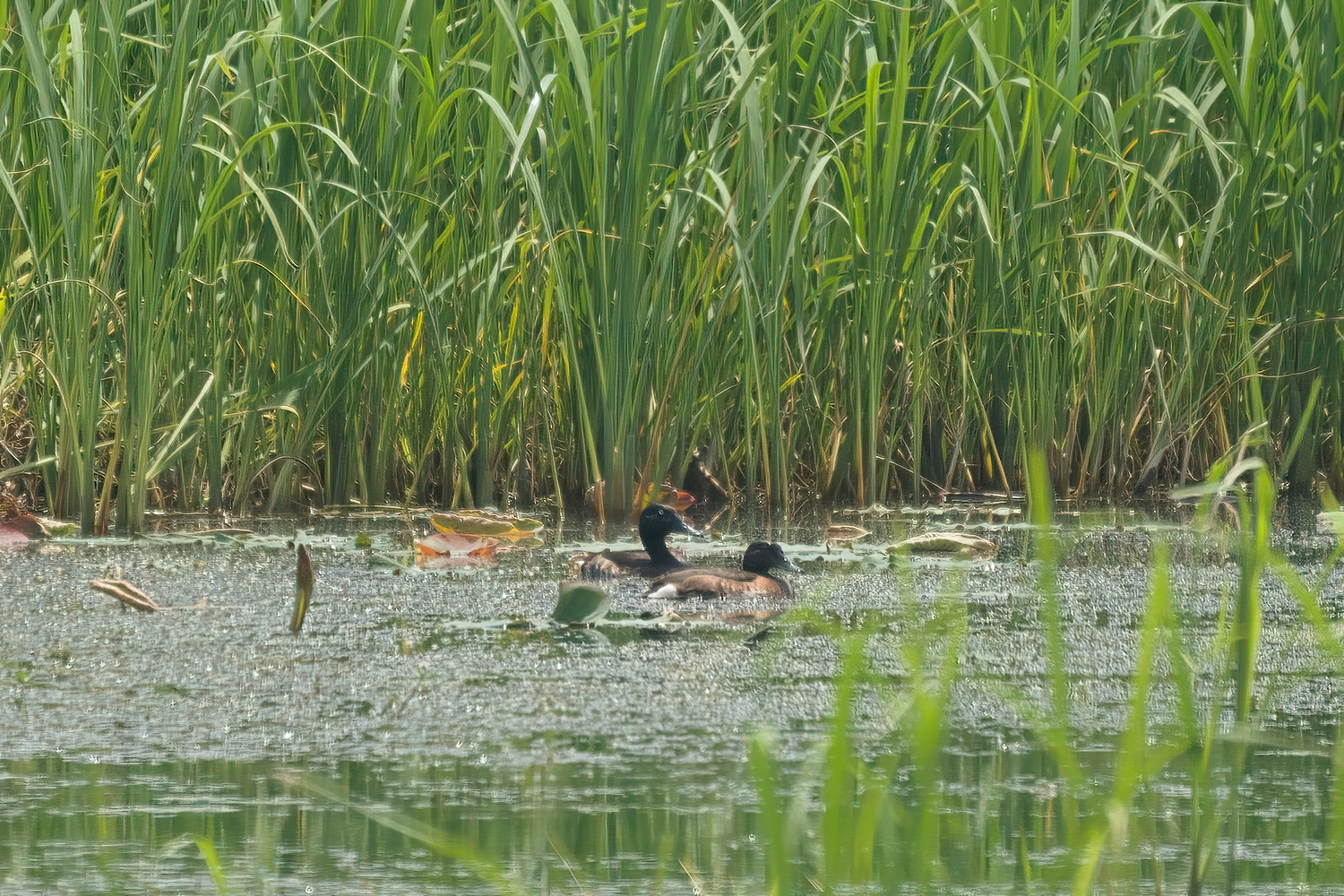
Breeding pair in Wuhan, Hubei, China

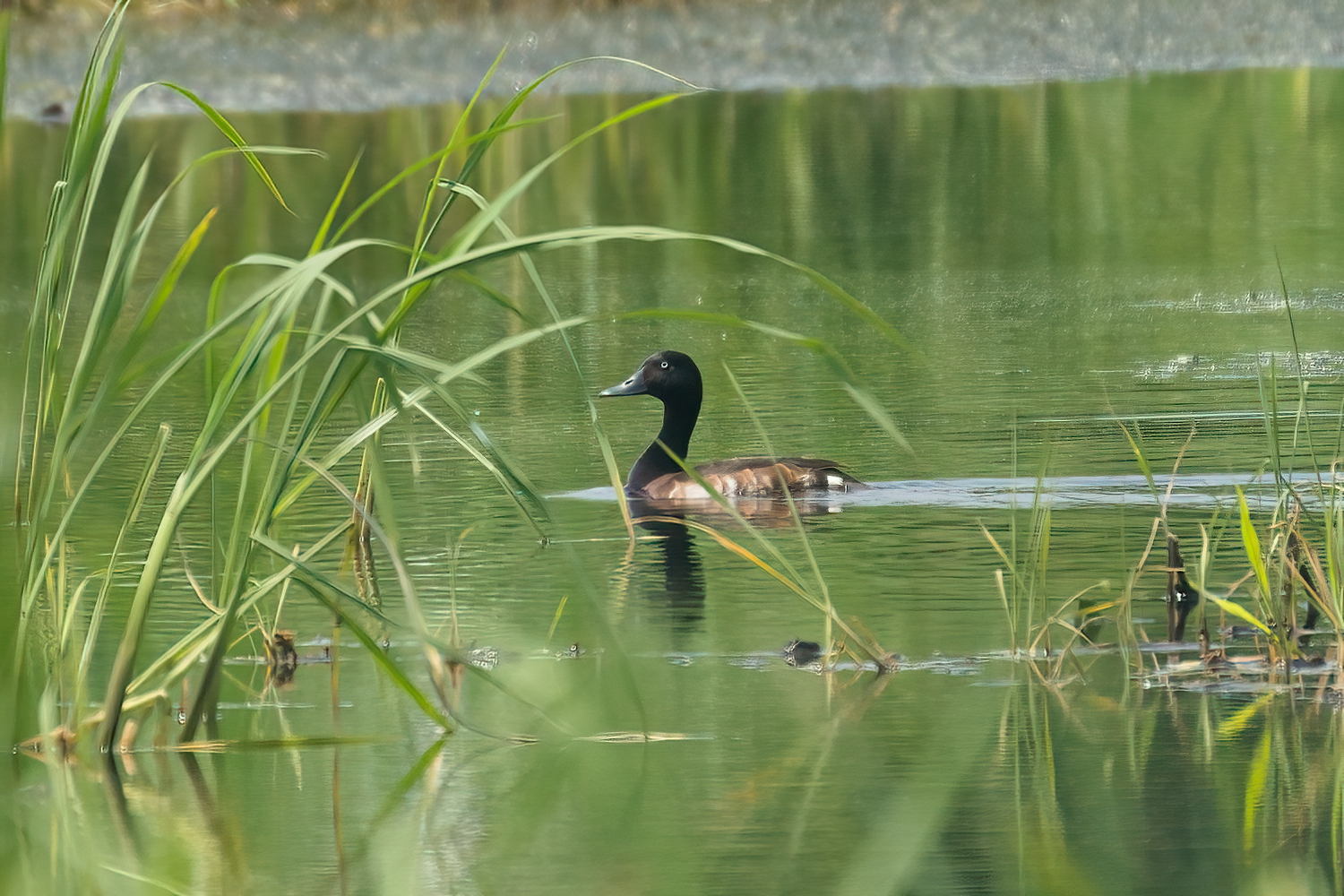
Breeding male

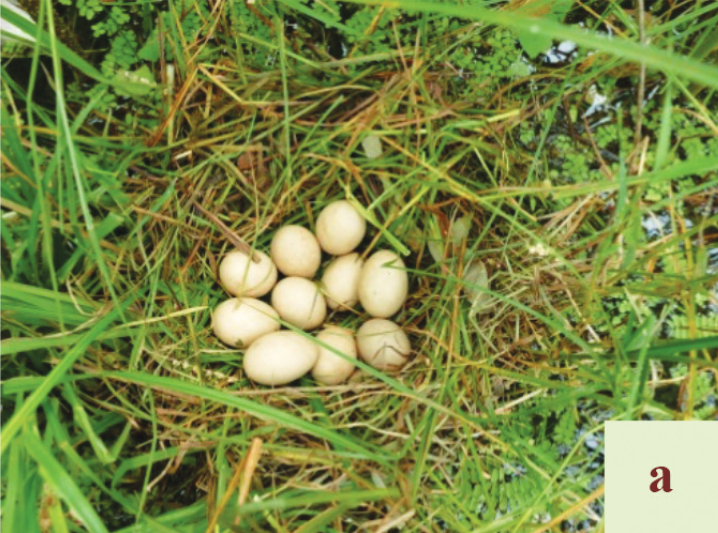
Eggs

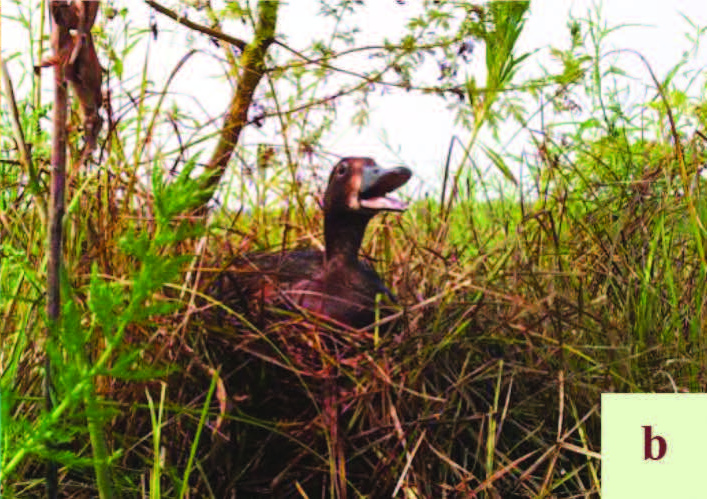
Hatching female

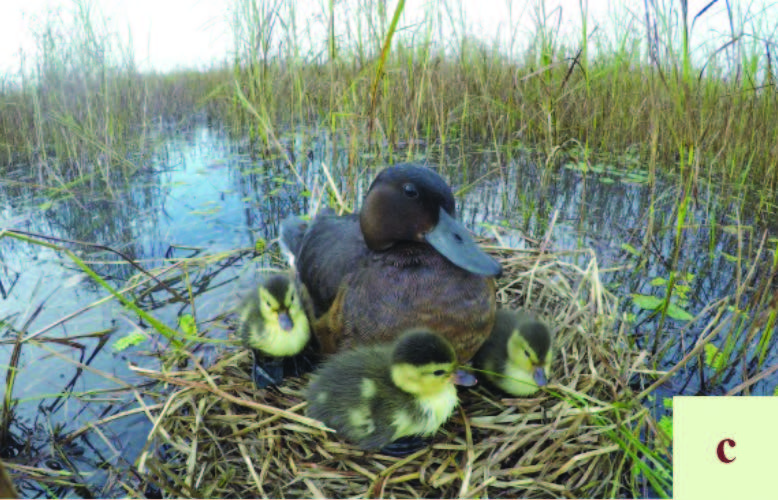
Female and ducklings

=== Biological interaction ===
Incomplete inter- and intra-specific brood parasitism were found in Baer's pochard. In Xianghai National Nature Reserve, Baer's pochards could parasitize gadwall and common pochard, and may be parasitized by common pochard. In Wuhan, Baer's pochard shares breeding sites with cotton teal, eastern spot-billed duck and mallard. Interspecific brood parasitism was not observed. Intraspecific parasitic was found in Wuhan. If caught, the parasite will get attacked by the host.

Baer's pochard has hybridized with lesser scaup, common pochard, ferruginous duck, New Zealand scaup, chestnut teal and wood duck in captivity. Ferruginous duck was observed displaying to Baer's pochards several times in China and South Korea. Some individuals showed mixed characteristics of common, ferruginous and Baer's pochards, (Note: It remains uncertain if these individuals escaped from bird collections.) so they may be currently hybridising in the wild. The Baer's pochard has declined sharply in recent years, but the ferruginous and common pochard has expanded their breeding grounds, and even to the core areas of Baer's pochard's, which makes the hypothesis possible.

The research on its gut microbiota showed that the richest microorganism phyla of Baer's pochard are Bacillota, Pseudomonadota and Bacteroidota, which were consistent with those of the domestic goose, duck and chicken. The gut microbiota in diarrheic Baer's pochard is low in diversity, and the species were also significantly different from healthy individuals. Most species in reduced numbers are thought to be intestinal beneficial bacteria.

== Threats and protection ==
Baer's pochard was once a common species in its range, but is now very rare. Mature individuals may be less than 1,000. According to records in China, there were 16,792 wintering individuals from 1986/87 (Note: Means the winter between 1986 and 1987, the same below.) to 1992/93, but only 3,472 from 1993/94 to 1998/99, and only 2,131 from 2002/03 to 2010/11. Bangladesh had more than 3,000 in 1996, India had more than 1,400 in 1995 and 1997, Myanmar had about 500–1,000 in the 1990s, and 596 were counted in 1998 in Thailand. While by 1999/00-2004/05, only 719 were counted in all wintering grounds except China, and only 48 individuals in 2005/06-2010/11. In China, hunting (Note: Although its meat was described as "extremely rank and fishy" by John Charles Phillips.) and habitat loss were considered to be the main threats. From 336 to 4,803 pochards were hunted annually in Honghu, Hubei from 1981 to 1997; in areas near Rudong County, maybe 3,000 are hunted every year. The wintering grounds have been significantly changed due to water pollution, fishing management, changes in aquatic plants, and the changing ecology of many wetlands in the Yangtze River floodplain. Factors in breeding and migrating grounds may also have contributed to its decline. The global decline shows no sign of slowing or stopping.

Baer's pochard was formerly classified as a vulnerable species by the IUCN. Recent research has shown that its numbers are decreasing more and more rapidly, and it was consequently uplisted to endangered status in 2008. In 2012, it was further uplisted to critically endangered. In 2014, the East Asian–Australasian Flyway Partnership (EAAFP) drafted the Baer's Pochard Task Force and it was endorsed in Jan 2015. Baer's pochard was listed as a first-class protected animal in China by 2021. In 2022, media reports state that the first captive population in China was established in the Beijing Zoo, with totally 54 individuals. It is planned to be further expanded and used for reintroduction.

A study published in 2022 showed that most breeding sites (81.8%) and suitable habitats (94%) are not located in protected areas, and overlap with large cities. Current protected areas may be less effective for the conservation under predicted global climate change, closely coordinated cross-border cooperation would be critical for Baer's pochard.
