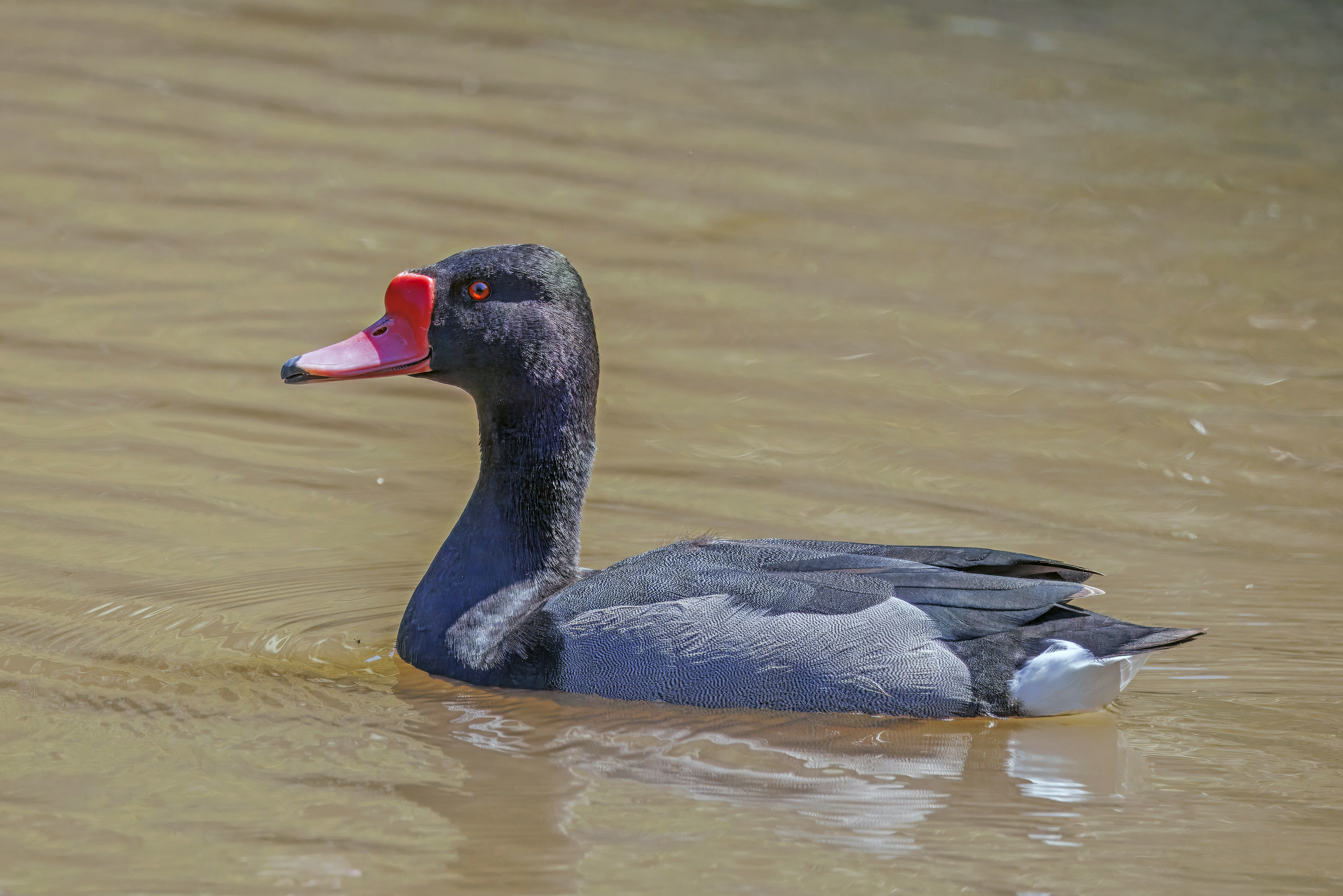
- Male, Chile
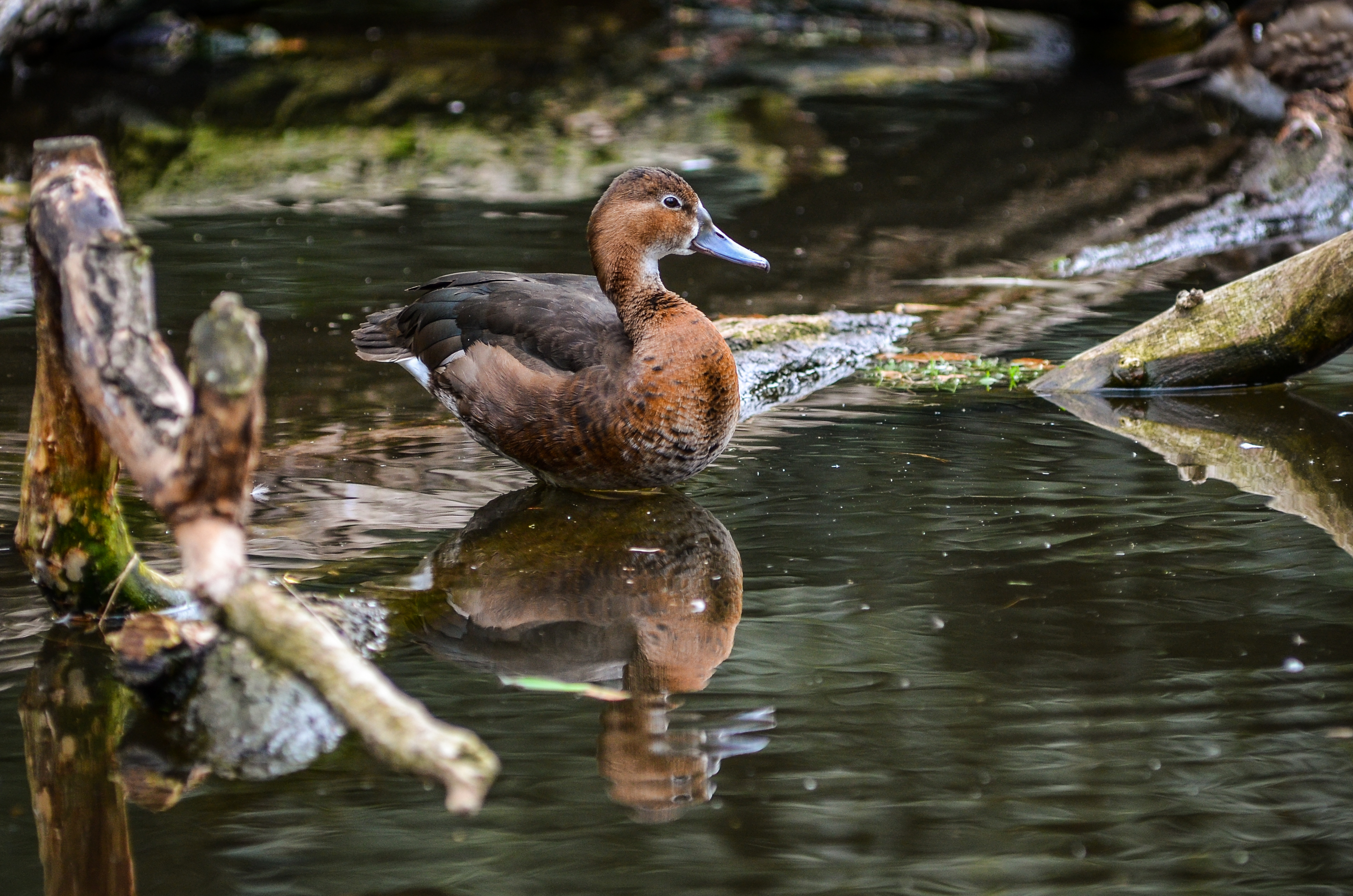
- Female (captive)

Conservation status
- Least Concern (IUCN 3.1)

Scientific classification
- Kingdom: Animalia
- Phylum: Chordata
- Class: Aves
- Order: Anseriformes
- Family: Anatidae
- Genus: Netta
- Species: N. peposaca

Binomial name
- Netta peposaca (Vieillot, 1816)

Synonyms
- Metopiana peposaca Vieillot, 1816

= Rosy-billed pochard =

Species of bird

The rosy-billed pochard (Netta peposaca), alternatively named rosybill or rosybill pochard, is a member of family Anatidae. Though classified as a diving duck, this pochard feeds more like a dabbling duck feeding on seeds roots, sedges, aquatic plants and other grasses. Netta is Ancient Greek for "duck" and peposaca is a transcription of the Guaraní name of this species which means "showy wings", referring to the broad white stripe that is only visible with stretched out wings. Male characteristic features include a bright red bill with a rounded knob at the base.

The rosy-billed pochard is endemic to South America. It is found in Argentina, central Chile, Paraguay, Uruguay and southern Brazil. The population in southern Argentina migrates northward during the austral winter, reaching Brazil and southern Bolivia. It is a vagrant to the Falkland Islands.

== Taxonomy ==
The rosy-billed pochard is one of five pochard species that make up the genus Netta, which is one of 31 genera of the subfamily Anatinae. Within subfamily Anatinae, there is a tribe called Aythini. This tribe was thought to be limited to the Northern Hemisphere (what was believed to be the Palearctic), and experienced three or four bursts of speciation, one of which was by the ancestor of the rosy-billed and southern pochards. Rosy-billed pochards were first described in 1816 by taxon author Vieillot, in Paraguay and Buenos Aires, Argentina. The species is highly autapomorphic and is placed in a sister-group with the southern pochard, but evidence for this relationship is lacking. Additionally, they have been known to hybridize with the red-crested pochard and other pochards from ornamental waterfowl collections. The rosybill is monotypic and thus no further classifications exist.

== Description ==
Like many other members of family Anatidae, the rosy-billed pochard exhibits significant sexual dimorphism. Males have a purplish-black head, neck and breast with gray sides, a white area on the crissum (the area around the cloaca), and a bright red bill and red eyes. The bill has a large rounded knob, which is bright red, and rest of the bill gradually fades towards a pale pink before ending with a black tip. The rounded knob of the bill increases in size and intensity in colour during the mating season. When in flight, the mostly dark plumage noticeably contrasts with the white primaries and secondaries. The legs and feet are yellow to orange. On the other hand, females are dull and brown. The bill is bluish-gray with a black tip and the legs are yellow-orange to gray. The contrasting white crissum is the most noticeable feature on females.

Young are almost identical in appearance to the females, but their underparts are darker. Rosybill adults lack the dull eclipse plumage that is characteristic of northern individuals of the genera Aytha and Anas.

Males tend to be slightly larger than females, but in general both sexes are very similar in terms of body size. Adults can grow to about 22 inches (56 cm) in length and weigh 2.2-2.6 pounds (1-1.2 kg). Despite these pochards being strong fliers, their blunt-tipped wings require a faster wing-beats than that of many ducks and they have some trouble taking off. They do not walk as well on land as other dabbling ducks because their legs are placed further back on their bodies to help propel them when underwater. Their minimum wingspan recorded is 72 cm, while the maximum is 84 cm.

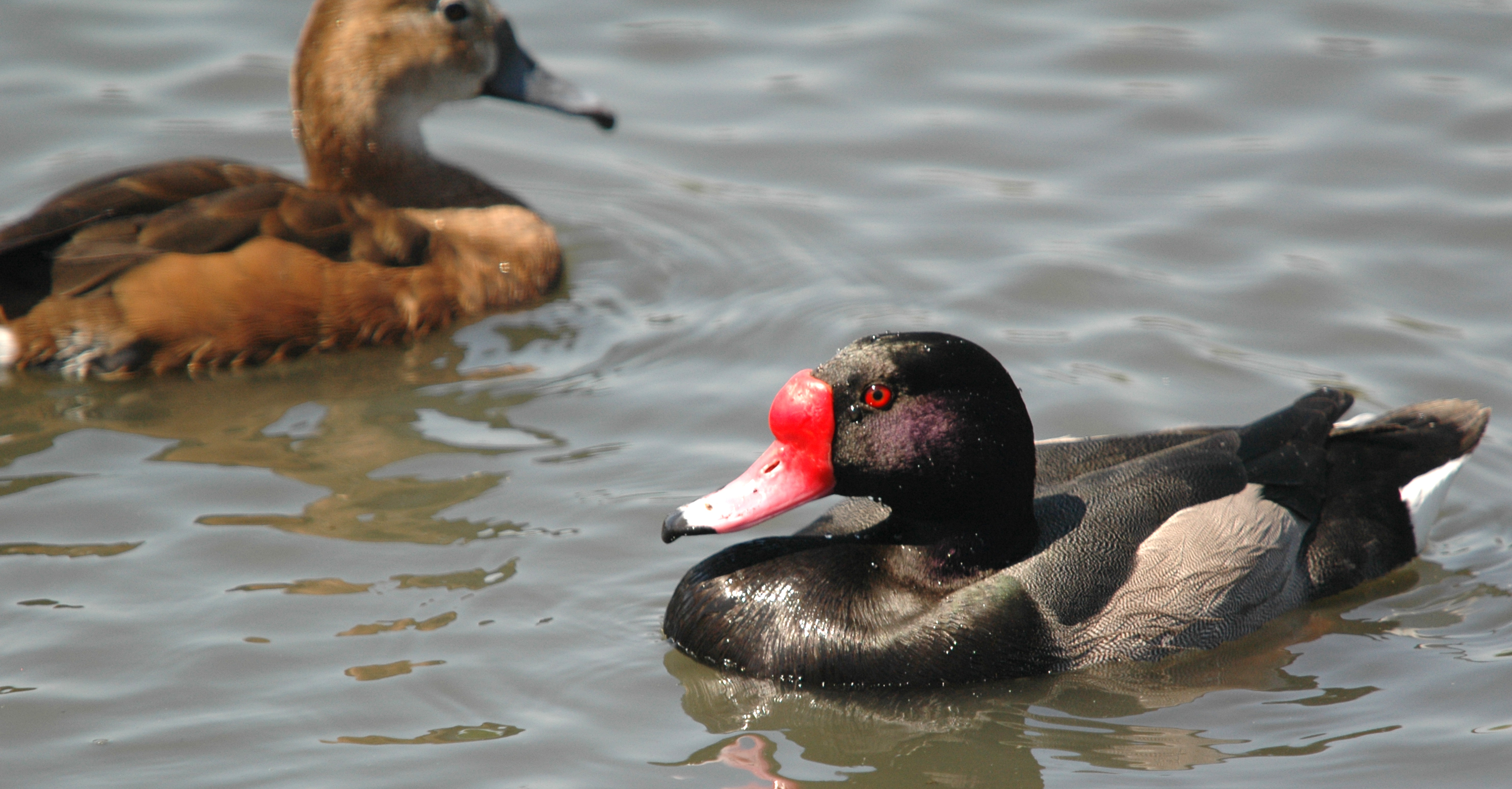
Male (foreground) and female (background)

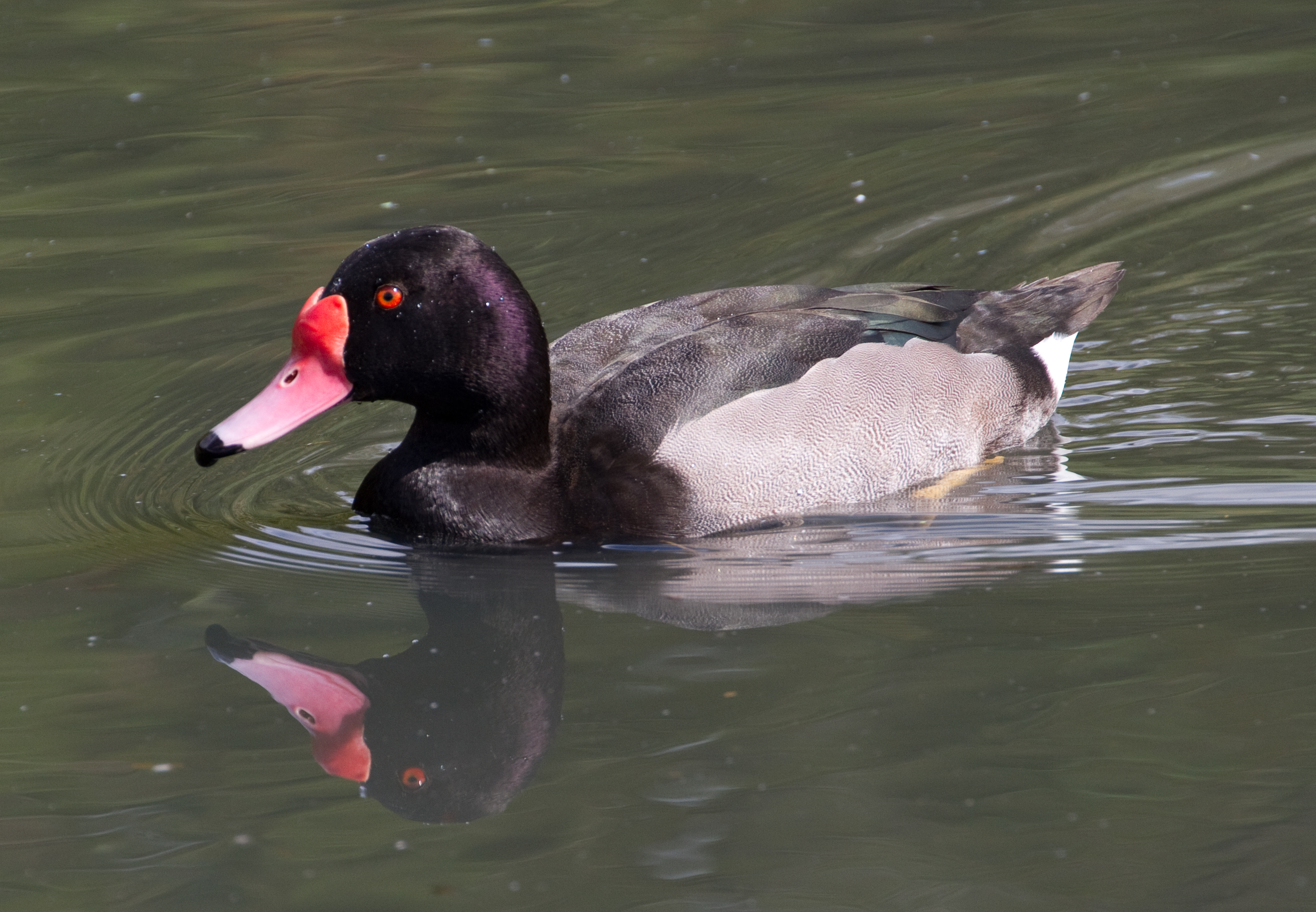
Adult male

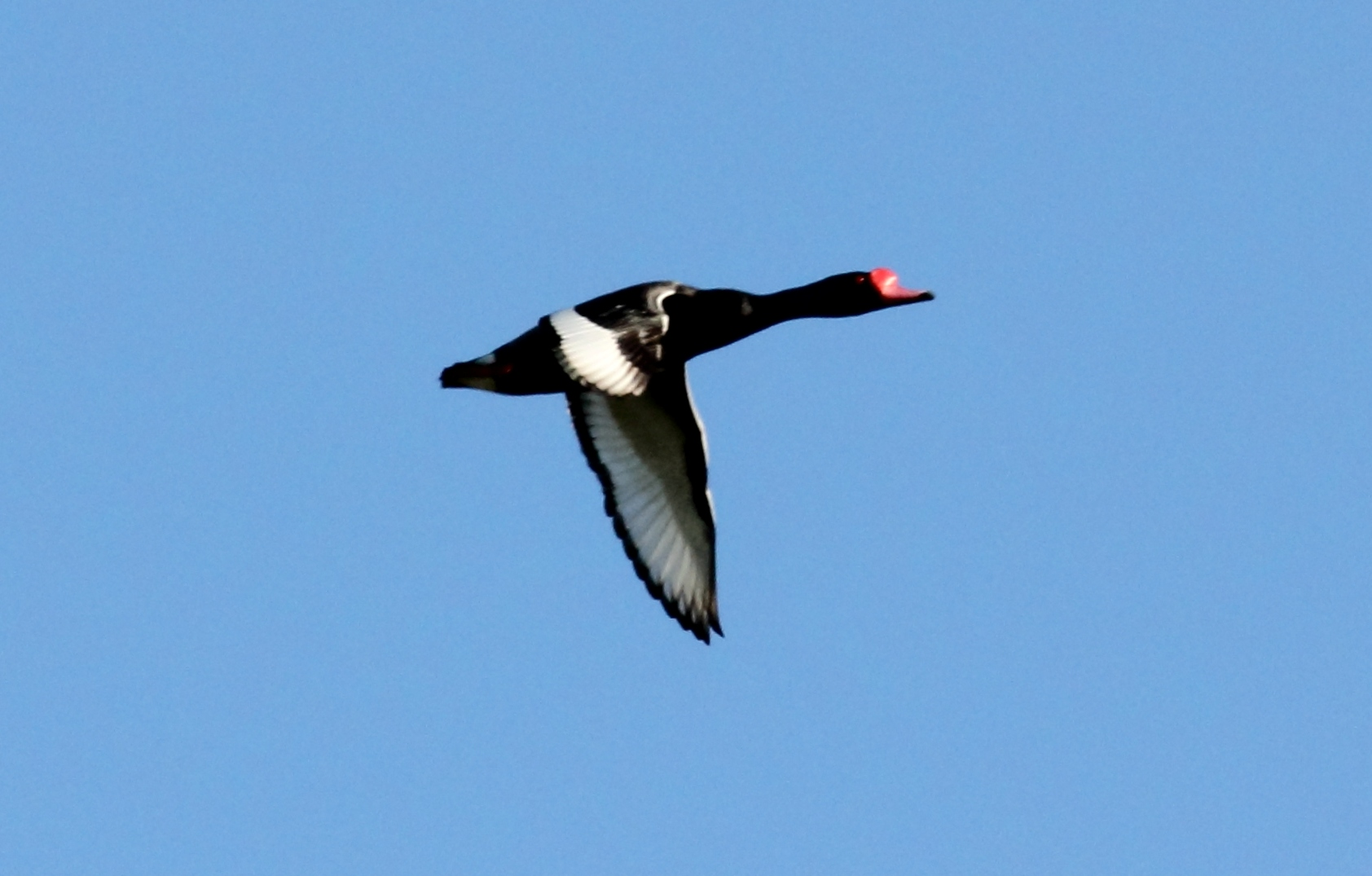
Adult male in flight

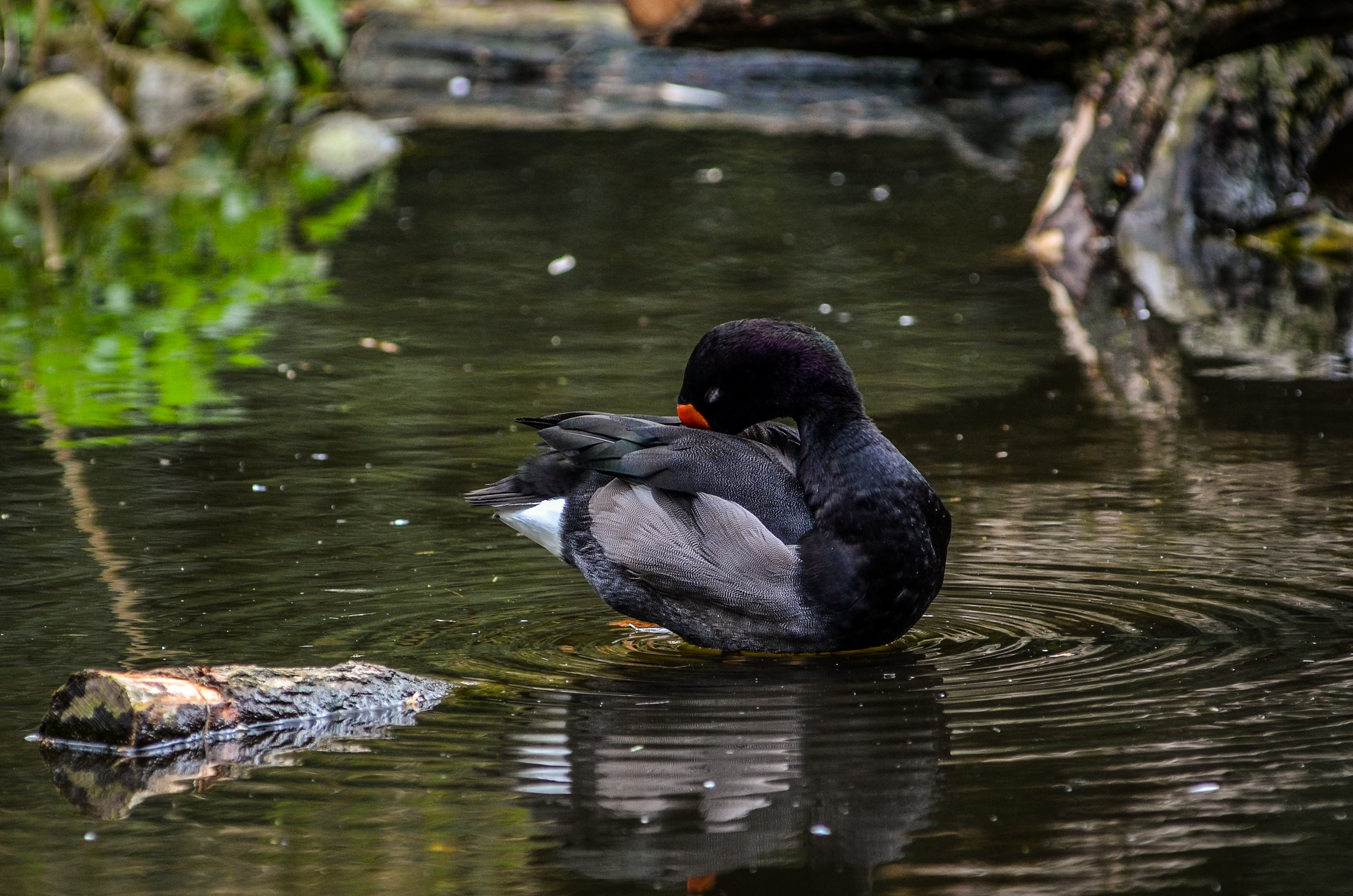
Adult male preening

== Distribution and habitat ==
Rosy-billed pochards nest within tall grasses in wetlands, mainly in areas that extend from the central provinces of Córdoba, Santa Fe, Entre Ríos, and Buenos Aires, southwards to Río Negro. Individuals are also found in shallow freshwater swamps, marshes and small lakes.

They are a fully migrant species and their movements are heavily associated with water conditions. Seasonal dry periods are common in central Argentina and they force birds to move towards larger water areas in late summer. By early fall, these areas are often dry and individuals are forced to move to find more water and better food sources elsewhere. An increase in population size can be seen during wet periods.

== Behaviour ==
Rosy-billed pochards are highly sociable ducks and may congregate in flocks of thousands of individuals.

=== Diet ===
Rosybills are omnivorous ducks, feeding on mostly knotgrass and barnyard grasses, but also roots, sedges, aquatic plants and other grasses and some animal products. However, their diet is dominated by seed consumption. This seed-dominated diet is due to the need to obtain carbohydrate-rich food, which is essential for meeting their thermoregulation requirements for the season. The seeds are high in energy, and this energy is also important for controlling temperature stressors. Though they are classified as diving ducks, they feed by dabbling on the surface of the water, upending in shallow water and occasionally grazing on land, but they rarely dive. Since the rosybill has a relative general diet and does not depend on a single food source, the species is said to be relatively adaptable to the offer of alternate food sources.

=== Reproduction ===
Each breeding season, a male and female rosy-billed pochard will form a seasonal bond. The pairs, however, are not monogamous and they do not pair for life. A distinct spring courtship period exists during which courtship displays are important. The courtship displays are performed before breedings and consist of distinct movements performed by both sexes. The displays include exaggerated drinking activities, mock preenings, head bobbings and neck extensions. Breeding generally occurs in October to November and can be done in single pairs or in small groups.

Females construct nests using plant matter and they line the nest with down. Nests are normally built over the water at the edge of the water. Females have also been observed to make their nests in rice fields.

The female lays up to 10 cream to greenish coloured eggs and she may even lay her eggs in another bird's nest if available. Eggs are incubated for 27-29 days, and fledging occurs within 50-75 days. Females will raise the ducklings without help from the males. Occasionally, broods from different females will merge and females will raise the young as a collective.

=== Vocalizations ===
Similar to almost all other bird species, rosybills have different calls used for different purposes. The characteristic 'honk' of family Anatidae is obvious in this pochard's vocalization, however it is much deeper as compared to a mallard, for example. Based on limited recordings of vocalizations, it appears as if the vocalization of the rosey-billed pochard is relatively quiet.

== Use by humans ==
Rosy-billed pochards are commonly used by humans for consumption, as pets/display animals and even in horticulture. The species, has been indicated as a pest in rice fields, and they experience a large amount of pressure from hunting in Argentina. Not only does this pressure stem from the direct hunting of the birds, but also from lead poisoning. Lead shot is the only available ammunition in Argentina, and investigations into lead toxicosis is still very recent. A 2013 study looking into lead pellet ingestion and tissue levels in ducks from Argentine hunting spots discovered that rosy-billed pochards were more prone to ingesting lead shot than any other duck species they sampled. Rosybills will swallow the lead bullets thinking they are stones, which are required for the mechanical breakdown of food within their gizzard. Not only were the bullets found inside the gizzard, but there were traces of lead concentrations within their bones, which is very toxic and detrimental to the health of the bird. This threat of lead poisoning from hunting has led researches to believe that populations could be declining due to excessive hunting.

Ownership of individuals is relatively accessible and they can be purchased even online.

== Conservation status ==
Current population trends show that populations are increasing and are not severely fragmented. There is currently no action recovery plan, however there is a systematic monitoring scheme in place. Conservation sites exist across the entire range of rosybills and they occur in at least one protected area.
