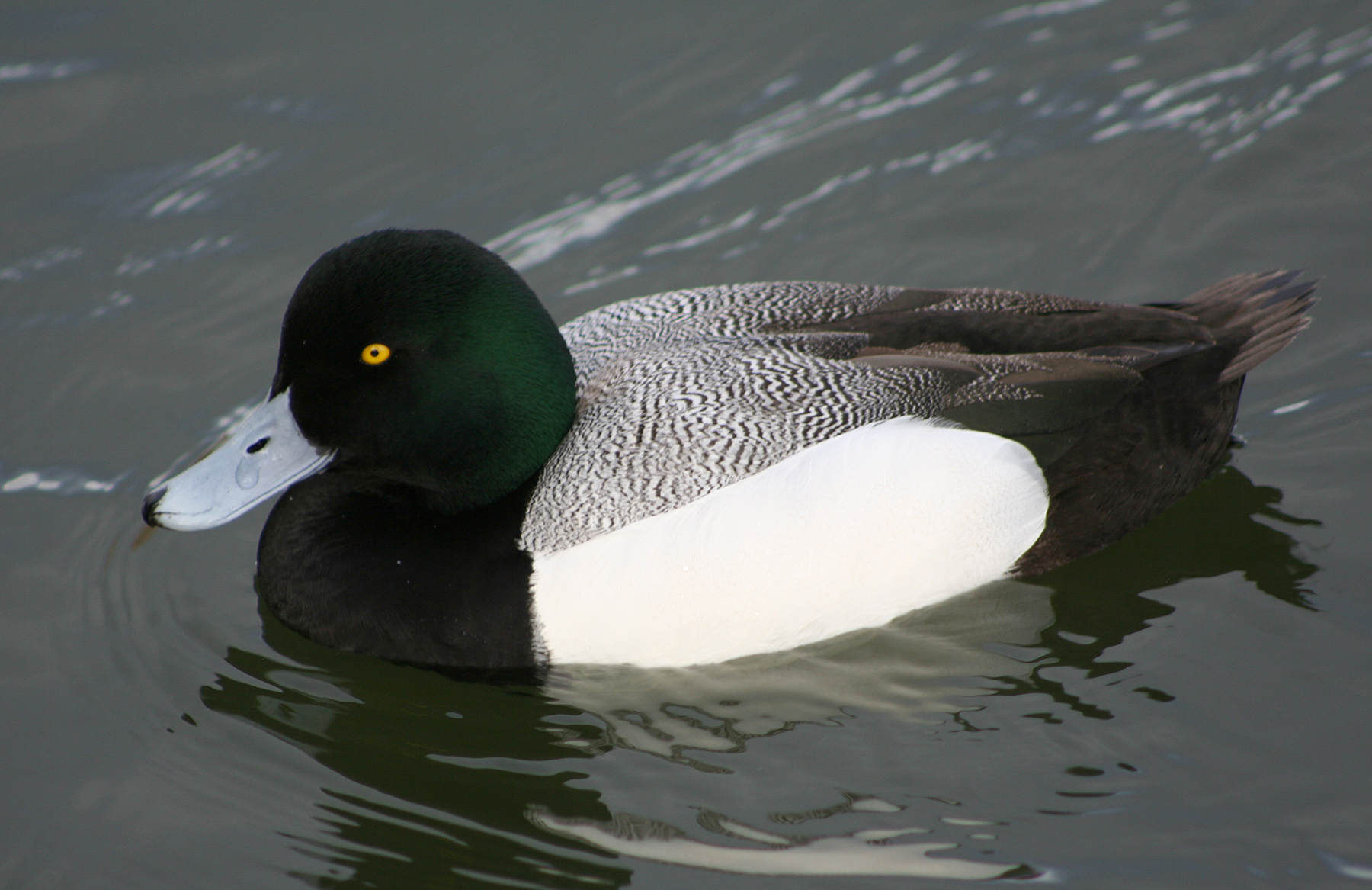
- Greater scaup, Aythya marila

Scientific classification
- Kingdom: Animalia
- Phylum: Chordata
- Class: Aves
- Order: Anseriformes
- Family: Anatidae
- Subfamily: Anatinae
- Tribe: Aythyini

Genera
- See the text

= Diving duck =

Diving ducks

Tribe of birds

The diving ducks, commonly called pochards or scaups, are a category of duck which feed by diving beneath the surface of the water. They are part of Anatidae, the diverse and very large family that includes ducks, geese, and swans.

The diving ducks are placed in a distinct tribe in the subfamily Anatinae, the Aythyini. While morphologically close to the dabbling ducks, there are nonetheless some pronounced differences such as in the structure of the trachea. mtDNA cytochrome b and NADH dehydrogenase subunit 2 sequence data indicate that the dabbling and diving ducks are fairly distant from each other, the outward similarities being due to convergent evolution. Alternatively, the diving ducks are placed as a subfamily Aythyinae in the family Anatidae which would encompass all duck-like birds except the whistling-ducks. The seaducks commonly found in coastal areas, such as the long-tailed duck (formerly known in the U.S. as oldsquaw), scoters, goldeneyes, mergansers, bufflehead and eiders, are also sometimes colloquially referred to in North America as diving ducks because they also feed by diving; their subfamily (Merginae) is a very distinct one however.

Although the group is cosmopolitan, most members are native to the Northern Hemisphere, and it includes several of the most familiar Northern Hemisphere ducks.

This group of ducks is so named because its members feed mainly by diving, although in fact the Netta species are reluctant to dive, and feed more like dabbling ducks.

These are gregarious ducks, mainly found on fresh water or on estuaries, though the greater scaup becomes marine during the northern winter. They are strong fliers; their broad, blunt-tipped wings require faster wing-beats than those of many ducks and they take off with some difficulty. Northern species tend to be migratory; southern species do not migrate though the hardhead travels long distances on an irregular basis in response to rainfall. Diving ducks do not walk as well on land as the dabbling ducks; their legs tend to be placed further back on their bodies to help propel them when underwater.

== Systematics ==
Three genera are included in the Aythyini. The marbled duck which makes up the monotypic genus Marmaronetta, however, seems very distinct and might have diverged prior to the split of dabbling and diving ducks as indicated by morphological and molecular characteristics. The probably extinct pink-headed duck, previously treated separately in Rhodonessa, has been suggested to belong into Netta, but this approach has been questioned. DNA sequence analyses have found it to be the earliest diverging member of the pochard group. The molecular analysis also suggests that the white-winged duck should be placed into a monotypic genus Asarcornis which is fairly close to Aythya and might belong into this subfamily.

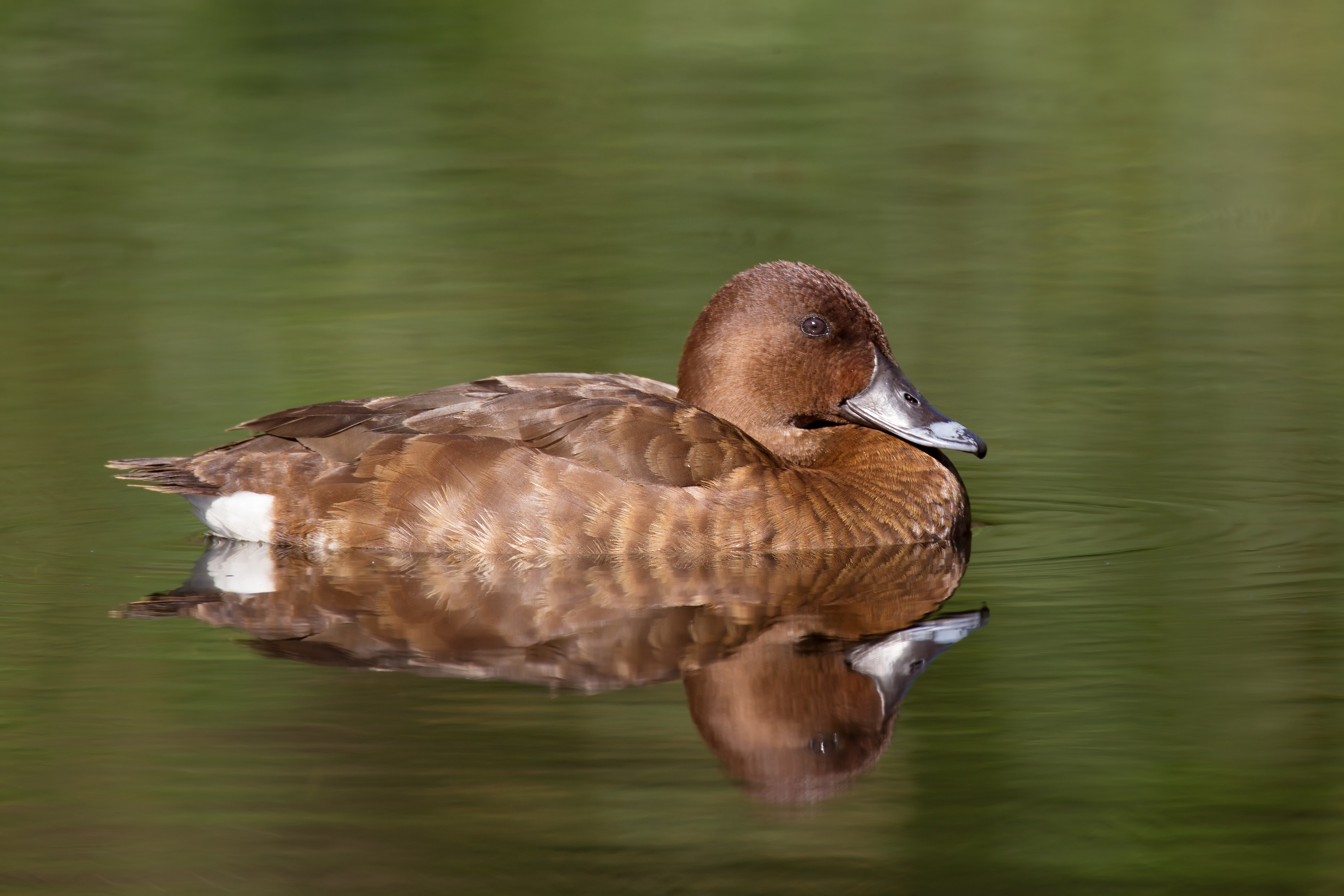
Female A. australis, the only Australian representative of Aythyinae

=== Family Anatidae ===
- Subfamily Anatinae
  - Tribe Aythyini
    - Genus Rhodonessa
      - Pink-headed duck (Rhodonessa caryophyllacea); probably extinct (1945?)
    - Genus Marmaronetta
      - Marbled duck (Marmaronetta angustirostris)
    - Genus Netta (provisionally including Rhodonessa)
      - Red-crested pochard (Netta rufina)
      - Southern pochard (Netta erythrophthalma)
      - Rosy-billed pochard (Netta peposaca)
    - Genus Aythya
      - Canvasback (Aythya valisineria)
      - Common pochard (Aythya ferina)
      - Redhead (Aythya americana)
      - Ring-necked duck (Aythya collaris)
      - Hardhead (Aythya australis)
      - Baer's pochard (Aythya baeri)
      - Ferruginous duck (Aythya nyroca)
      - Madagascar pochard (Aythya innotata) – feared to be extinct, rediscovered (2006)
      - Réunion pochard, (Aythya cf. innotata) – extinct (c. 1690s)
      - New Zealand scaup (Aythya novaeseelandiae)
      - Tufted duck (Aythya fuligula)
      - Greater scaup (Aythya marila)
      - Lesser scaup (Aythya affinis)
