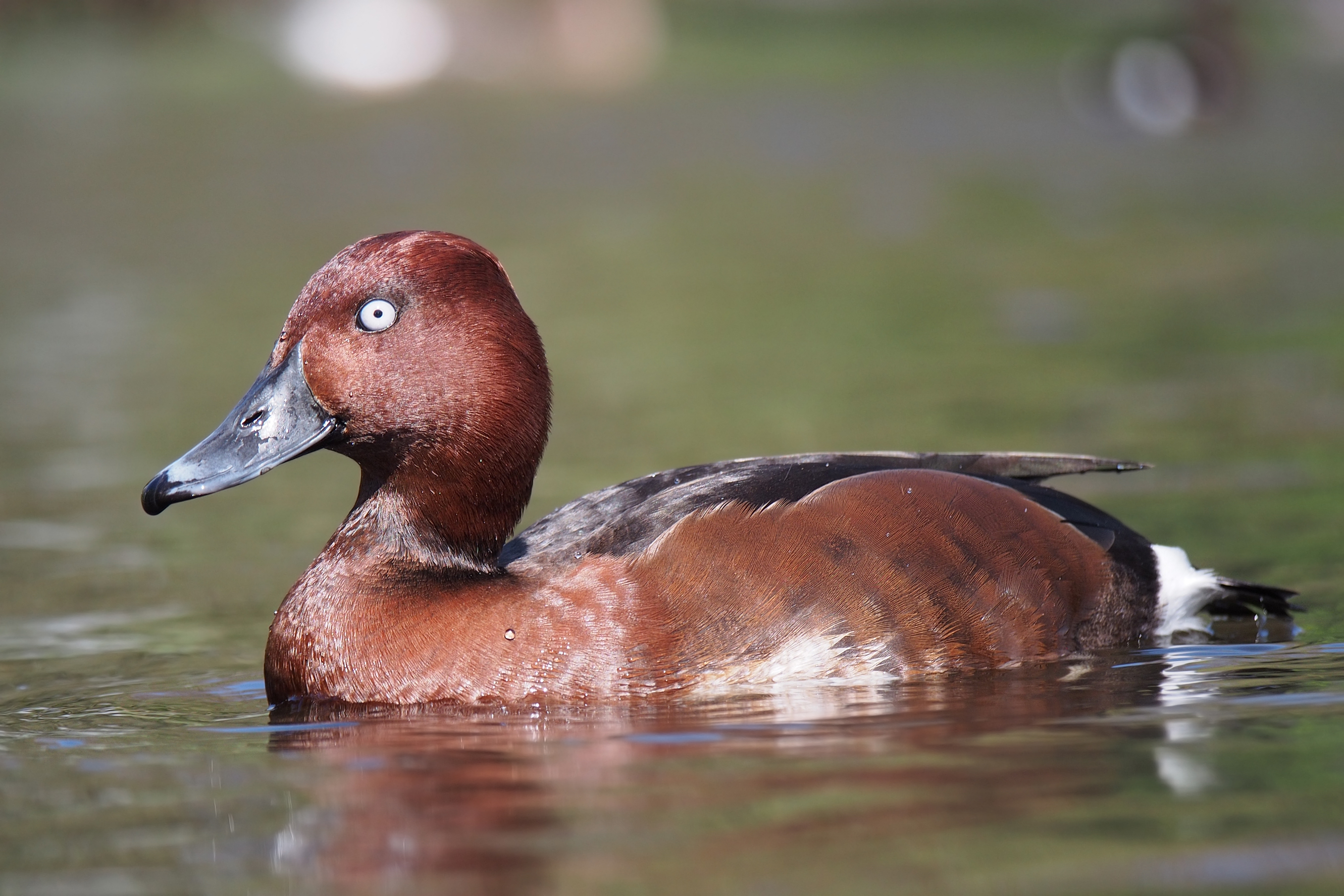
- Male
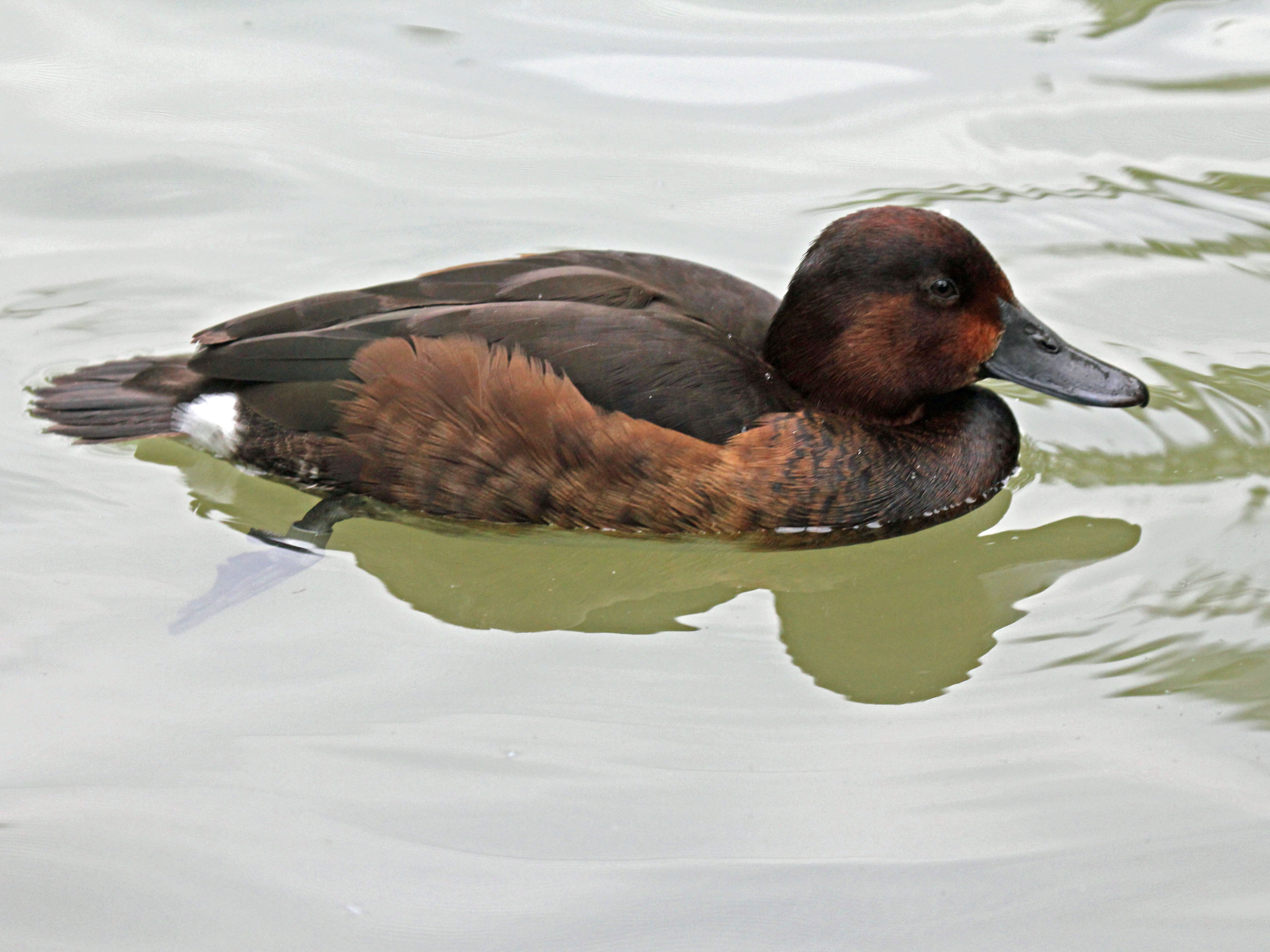
- Female

Conservation status
- Near Threatened (IUCN 3.1)

Scientific classification
- Kingdom: Animalia
- Phylum: Chordata
- Class: Aves
- Order: Anseriformes
- Family: Anatidae
- Genus: Aythya
- Species: A. nyroca

Binomial name
- Aythya nyroca (Güldenstädt, 1770)
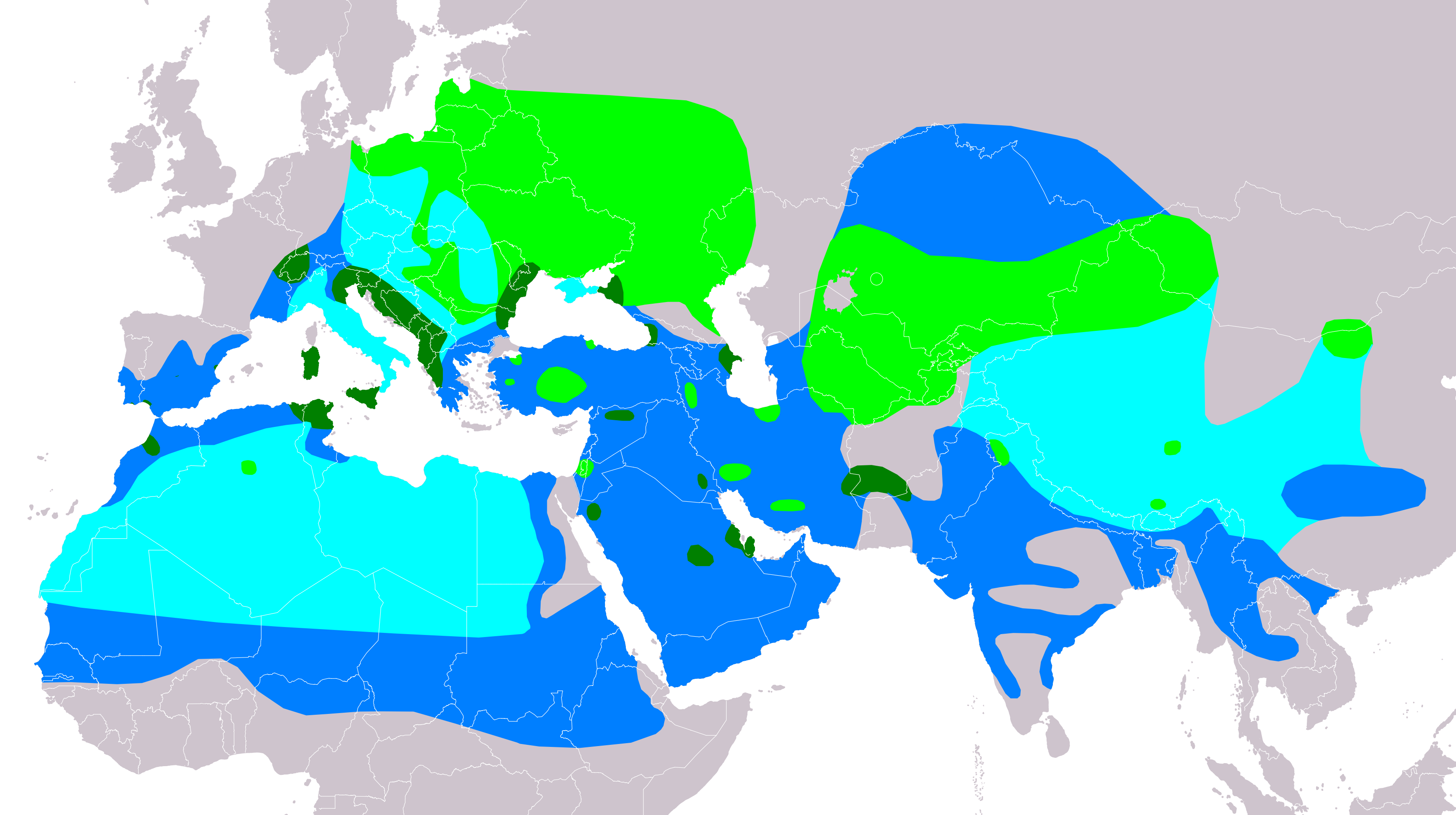
- Range of A. nyroca Breeding Resident Passage Non-breeding

= Ferruginous duck =

Species of bird

The ferruginous duck (Aythya nyroca), also known as the ferruginous pochard, common white-eye or white-eyed pochard, is a medium-sized diving duck native to the Palearctic. The scientific name is derived from the Ancient Greek word, αἴθυιᾰ (aithuia), an unknown seabird mentioned by authors including Hesychius and Aristotle, and the Russian word, нырок (nyrok), the Russian word for pochard, which occurs in the bird's Russian common name.

== Description ==
The breeding male is a rich, dark chestnut on the head, breast and flanks with contrasting pure white undertail coverts. In flight the white belly and underwing patch are visible. The females are duller and browner than the males. The male has a yellow eye and the females have a dark eye.

== Habitat ==
The ferruginous duck prefers quite shallow fresh waterbodies with rich submerged and floating vegetation with dense stands of emergent vegetation on the margins. In some areas it will use saline or brackish pools or wetlands. On passage and wintering will also frequent coastal waters, inland seas and large, open lagoons.

== Distribution ==
The breeding range of the ferruginous duck is from Iberia and the Maghreb east to western Mongolia, south to Arabia, although in the west is now scarce and localised and locally extirpated in some countries. The duck winters throughout the Mediterranean Basin and the Black Sea, smaller number migrate into sub-Saharan Africa via the Nile Valley. Eastern birds winter in south and south-east Asia.

== Habits ==
These are gregarious birds, but less social than other Aythya species but where common it can form large flocks in winter, often mixed with other diving ducks, such as tufted ducks and common pochards. Form pairs from January onwards and during courtship the male often curls his tail so that it dips into the water forming a triangular white patch of the undertail coverts. In areas where it is common it will form colonies at protected sites such as islands, often in association with gulls. Where scarce it nests singly, in dispersed and concealed sites.

Eggs are laid from the end of April or early May in a nest which is sited on the ground close to water, or sometimes a floating nest is built among emergent vegetation. The eggs are incubated for 25–27 days and the fledging period is 55–60 days.

These birds feed mainly by diving or dabbling. They eat aquatic plants with some molluscs, aquatic insects and small fish. They often feed at night, and will upend (dabble) for food as well as the more characteristic diving.

== Conservation ==
The species is threatened by the degradation and destruction of its favoured habitats by anthropogenic causes which are very wide and varied including impoundment, drainage, pollution and mismanagement. The introduction of non-native species has also caused habitat degradation, e.g. the stocking of lakes with and accidental introduction of grass carp Ctenopharyngodon idella has caused reductions in plant and animal biomass available for the ducks to feed on. In addition, the increased threat of drought due to climate change may pose a threat to the species in the drier parts of its range. Increased disturbance by fishing boats and anglers among marginal vegetation could cause abandonment of the breeding sites or disrupt the timing of breeding particularly in populated areas, e.g. Western Europe. Ferruginous ducks are also threatened by hunting and large numbers are shot on passage in the autumn and in the wintering areas. Although protected in most European countries illegal and accidental hunting persists. It is one of the species to which the Agreement on the Conservation of African-Eurasian Migratory Waterbirds (AEWA) applies. Among recent local initiatives it should be mentioned inclusion of the breeding habitats of the species in Armenia into network of Emerald Sites protected by the Bern Convention.

== Gallery ==
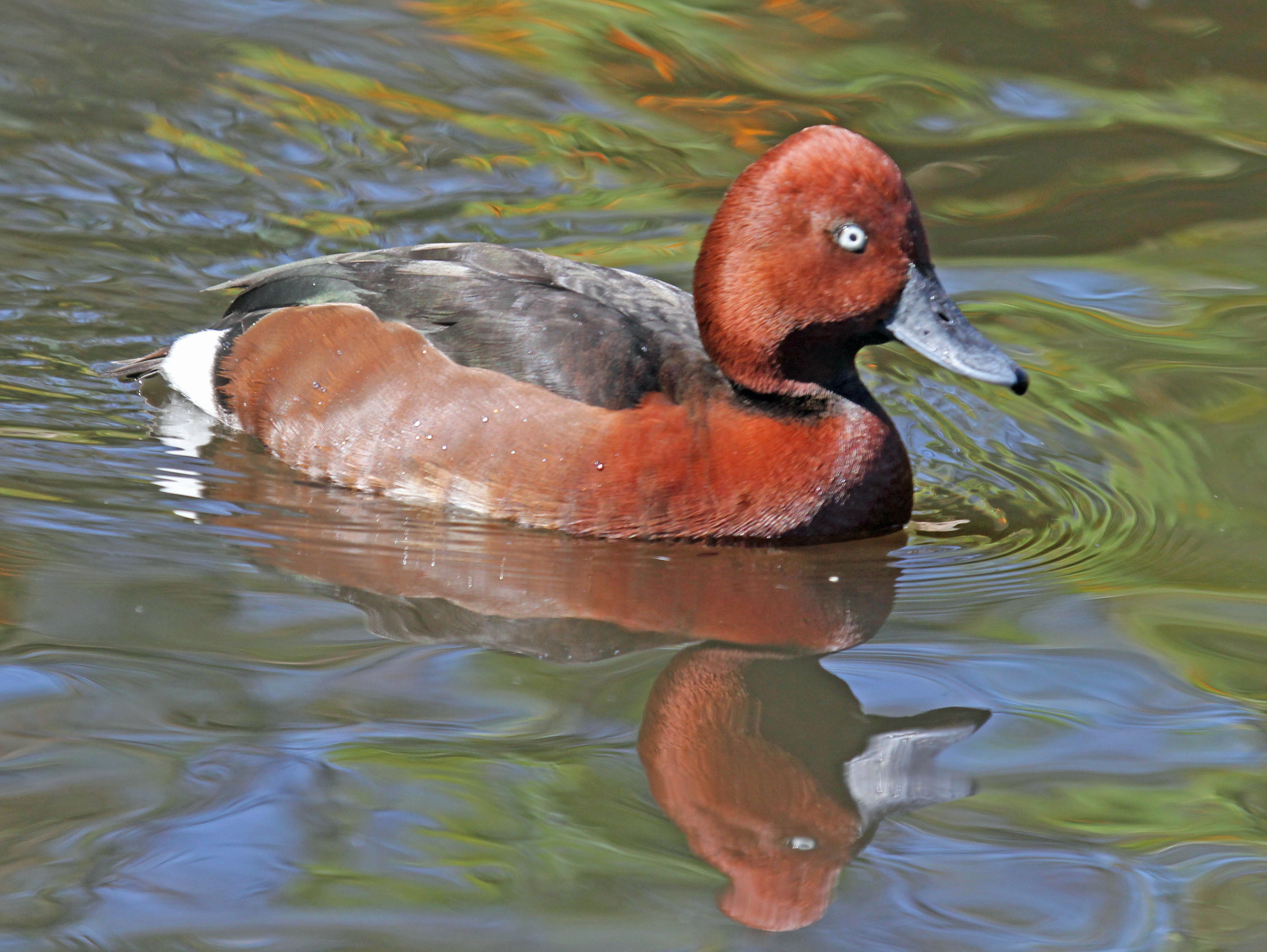
Male

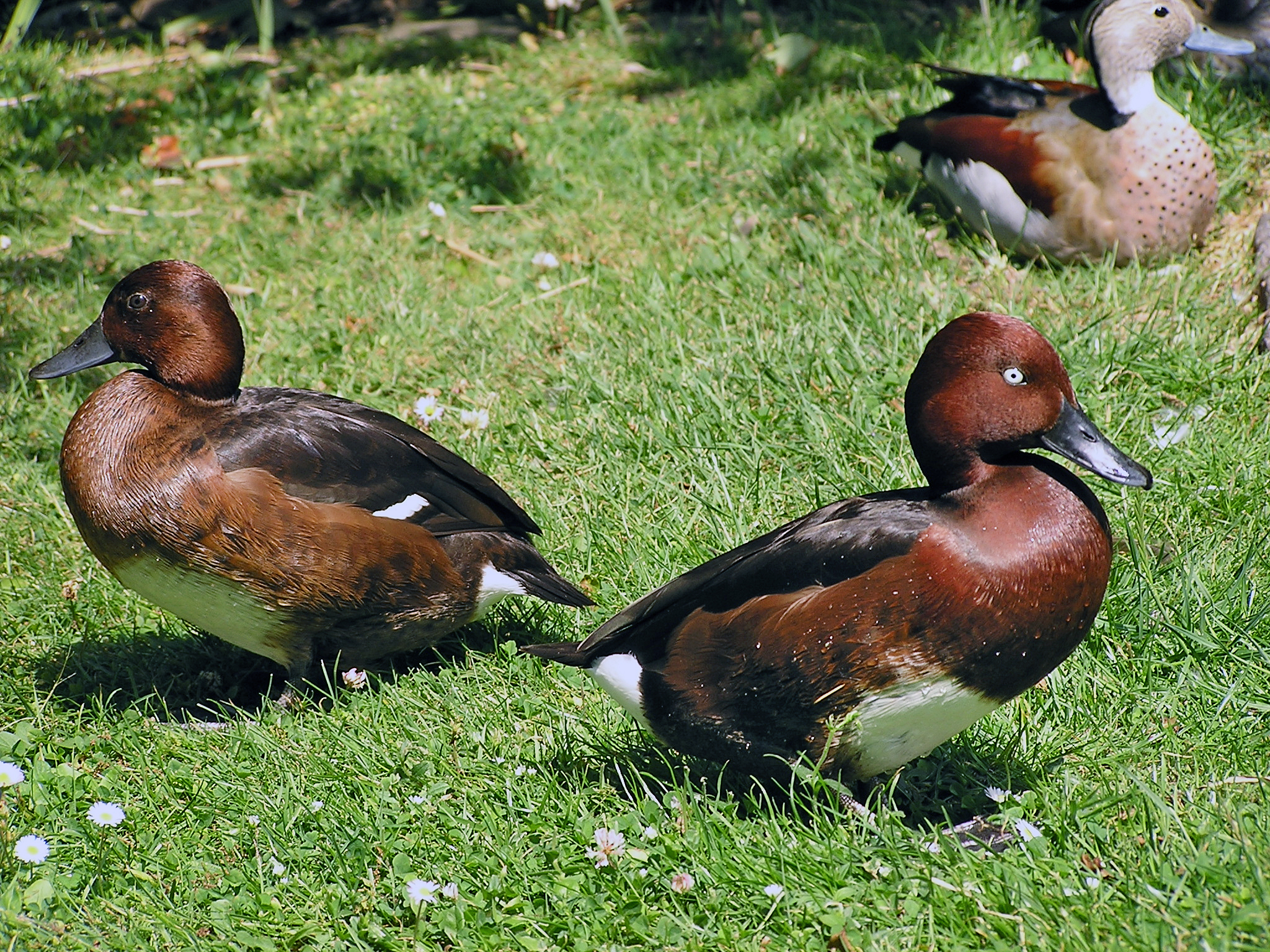
Ferruginous ducks

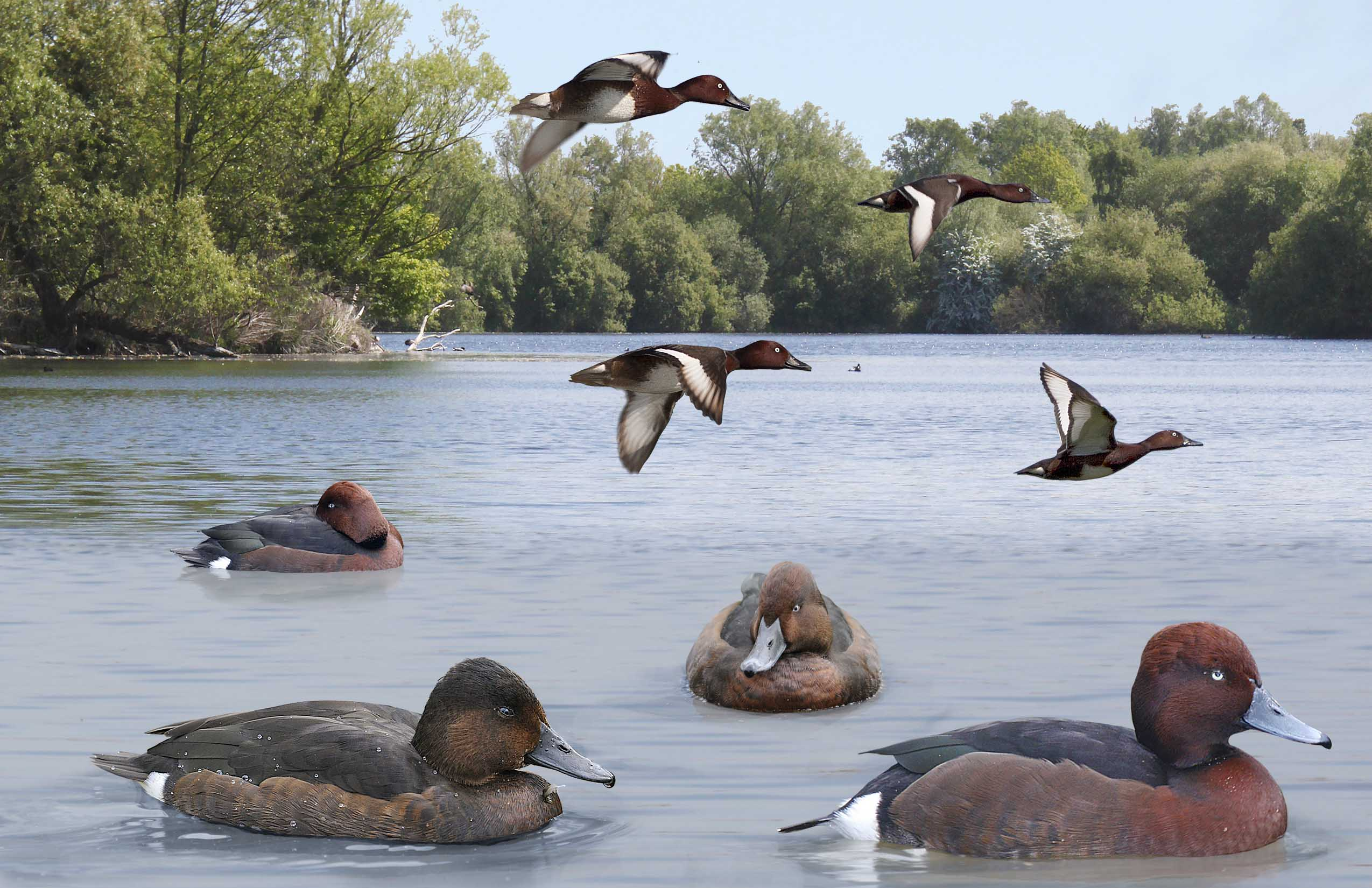
ID composite

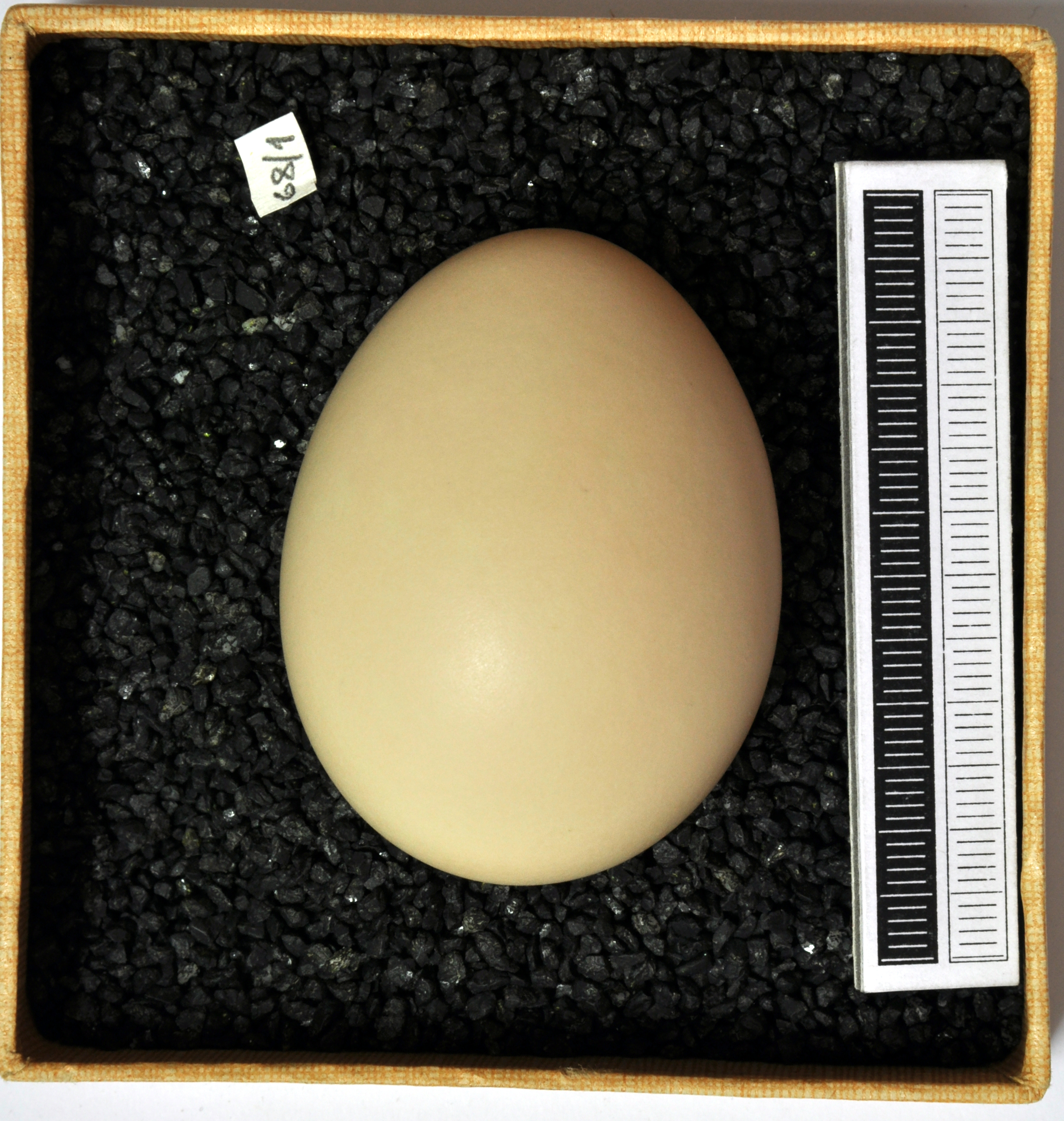
Egg, Collection Museum Wiesbaden

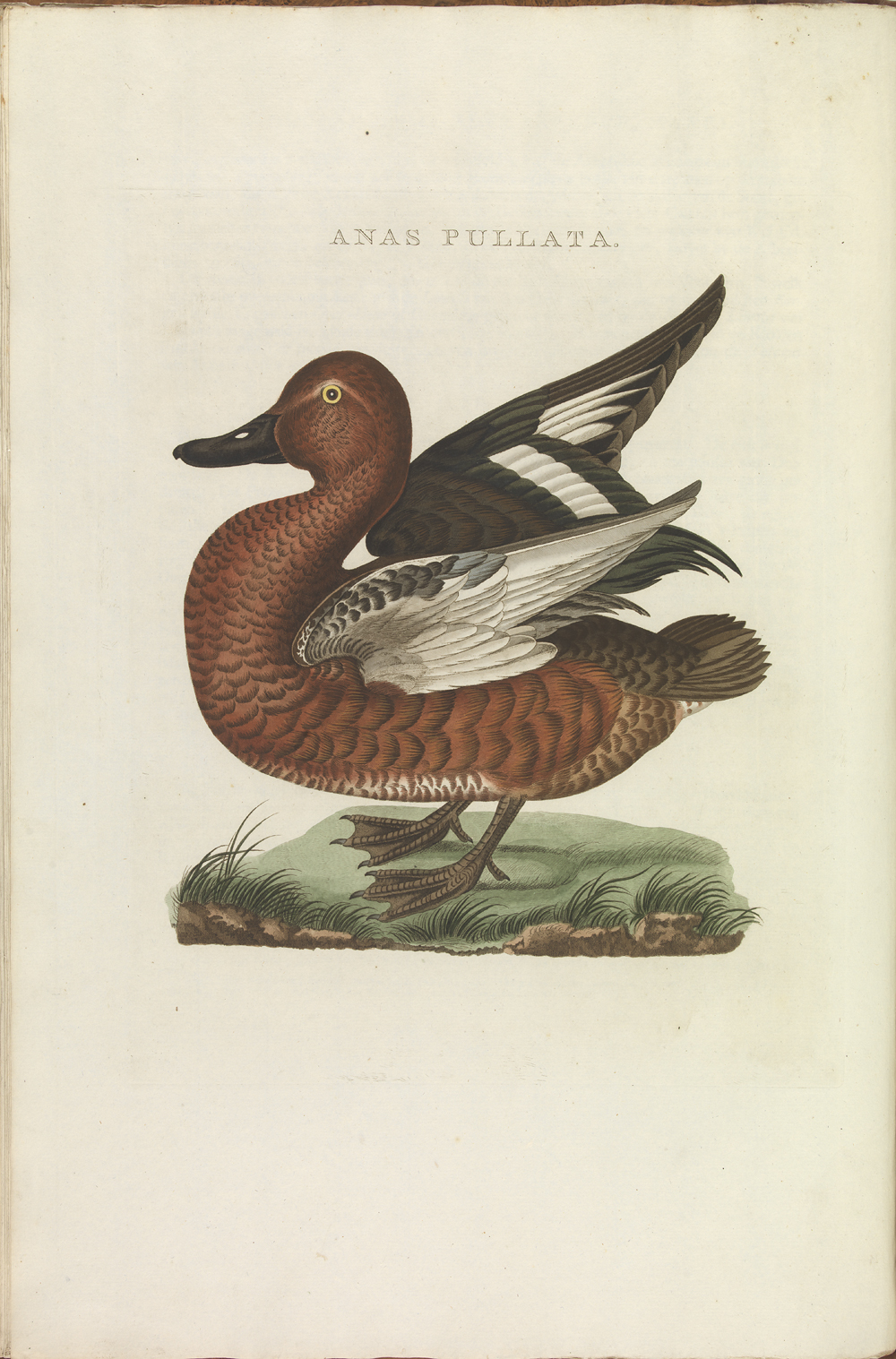
Aythya nyroca (male), referred to as Anas pullata, in Nederlandsche Vogelen, c. 1800

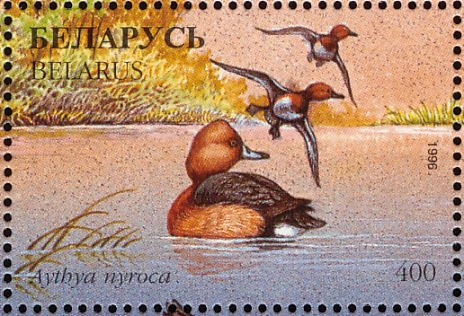
Ferruginous duck stamp from Belarus
