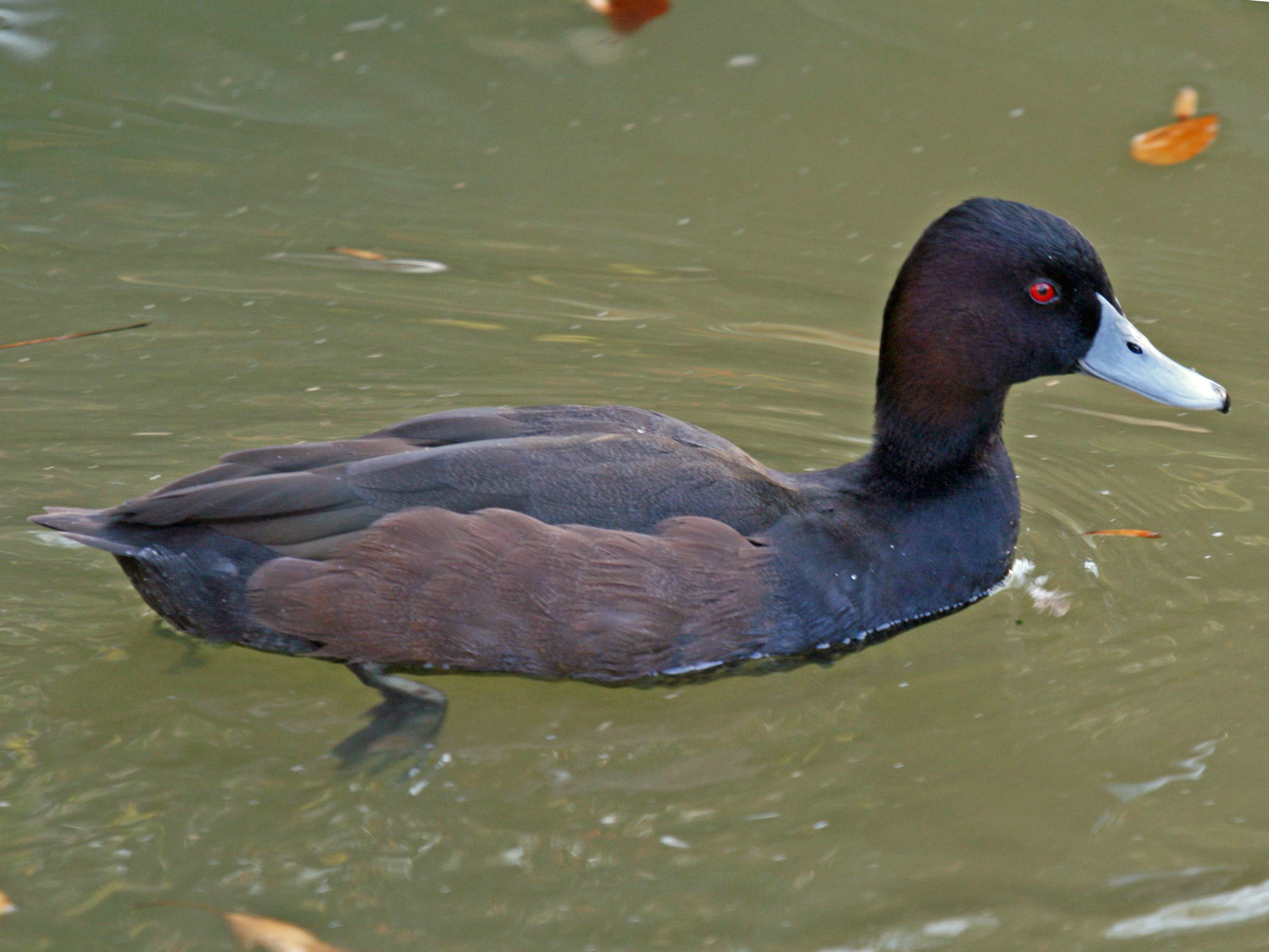
- Male southern pochard
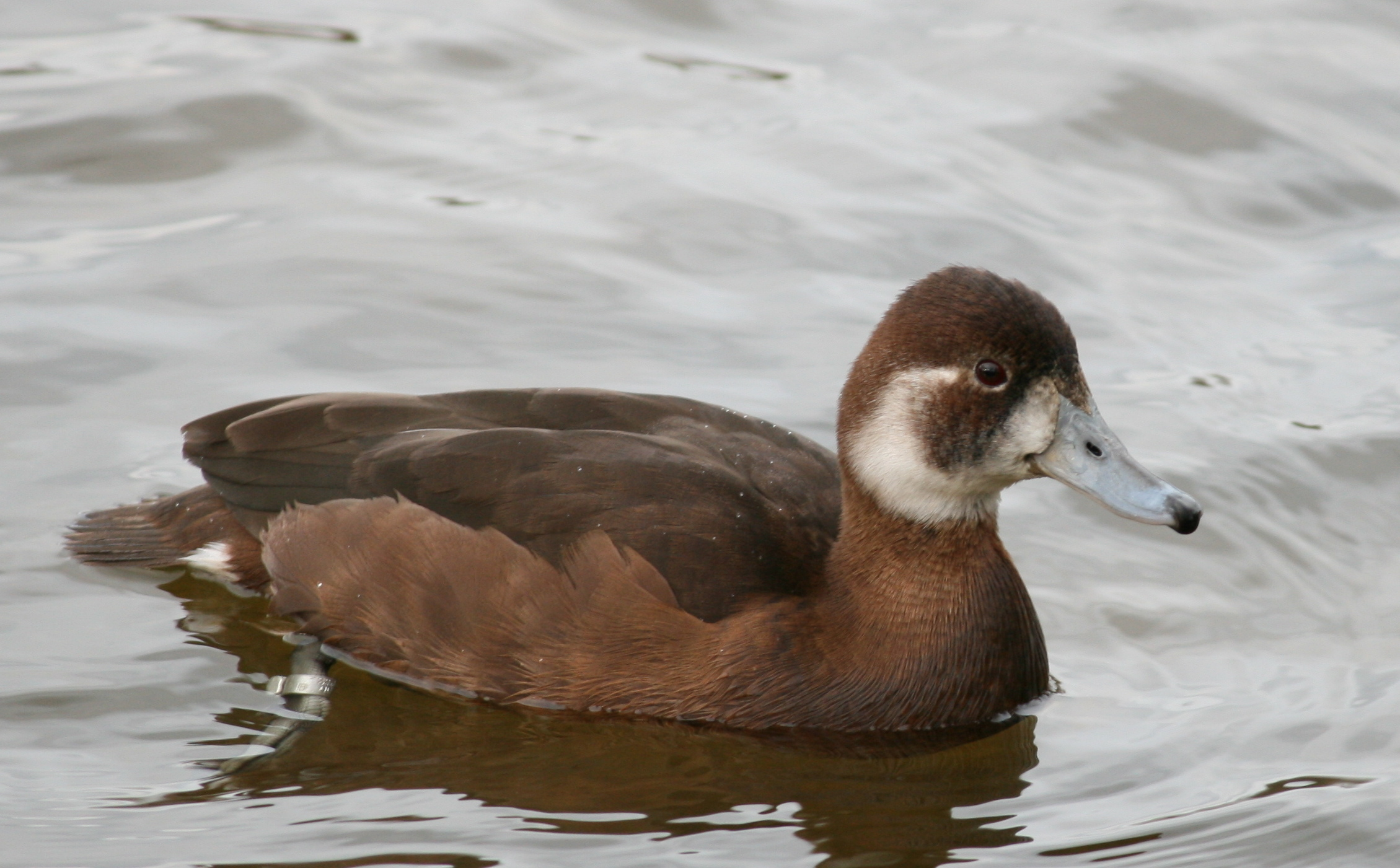
- Female southern pochard

Conservation status
- Least Concern (IUCN 3.1)

Scientific classification
- Kingdom: Animalia
- Phylum: Chordata
- Class: Aves
- Order: Anseriformes
- Family: Anatidae
- Genus: Netta
- Species: N. erythrophthalma

Binomial name
- Netta erythrophthalma (Wied-Neuwied, 1833)

Synonyms
- Anas erythrophthalma Wied-Neuwied, 1833; Metopiana erythropthalma (Wied-Neuwied, 1833); Nyroca brunnea Eyton, 1838

= Southern pochard =

Species of bird

The southern pochard (Netta erythrophthalma) is a species of diving duck, and a member of the genus Netta. They are one of 17 modern pochard species, also known as bay ducks. There are two subspecies, the South American (southern) pochard N. e. erythrophthalma (Wied-Neuwied, 1833) and the African (southern) pochard N. e. brunnea (Eyton, 1838). Altogether, they comprise a population of 20,000 to 65,000 mature individuals.

The South American pochard has a fragmented range but is found mostly in Brazil and Venezuela. Here it occurs in a wide variety of shallow fresh waters with submerged vegetation, from the lowlands up to 3,700 metres.

The African pochard occurs from the Cape to the Ethiopian highlands on water bodies with or without emergent vegetation. They are suspected to have been strong migrants in the past but the construction of numerous farm dams seems to allow them a more sedentary lifestyle. They reach highest concentrations in Africa's central plateaus and in the south-western winter rainfall region.

== Description ==
The birds are dark brown/black in colour, with chestnut wings and a pale grey bill with a black tip. They have a large white band on the underside of their wings, which is visible in flight. The males have a solid coloured body and head, while the females have a white marking at the base of their bill, as well as a white crescent ranging from behind the eye to the neck.

== Etymology ==
Variations on the name "pochard" include packard and poker. The word is derived from the middle French word "pocher", meaning to poke or thrust. This is due to their feeding behaviour of poking the lake bed. Many birds with similar behaviour also had the nickname of poker in the past.

== Taxonomy ==
Two syntype specimens of Nyroca brunnea Eyton (Monogr. Anat., 1838, p.161., pl.23.), the African Southern Pochard, are held in the vertebrate zoology collections of National Museums Liverpool at World Museum, with accession numbers NML-VZ D832 (male adult) and NML-VZ D832a (female adult). The specimens were collected in South Africa and came to the Liverpool national collection via Thomas Campbell Eyton's collection and the 13th Earl of Derby's collection which was bequeathed to the city of Liverpool. There are two other syntype specimens, including NHMUK 1845.7.6.271, in the Natural History Museum at Tring.

Pochards are known as Aythyini, a tribe within the Anatinae subfamily of Anatidae. A phylogenetic analysis on the tribe's 17 species was done in 1995. Species within the tribe are notably similar, both behaviourally and anatomically. This analysis classified the pochard's sister clade as the rosy-billed pochard (Netta peposaca). It also classified the southern pochard as only one of the three polytypic Aythyini species, meaning it has multiple subspecies.

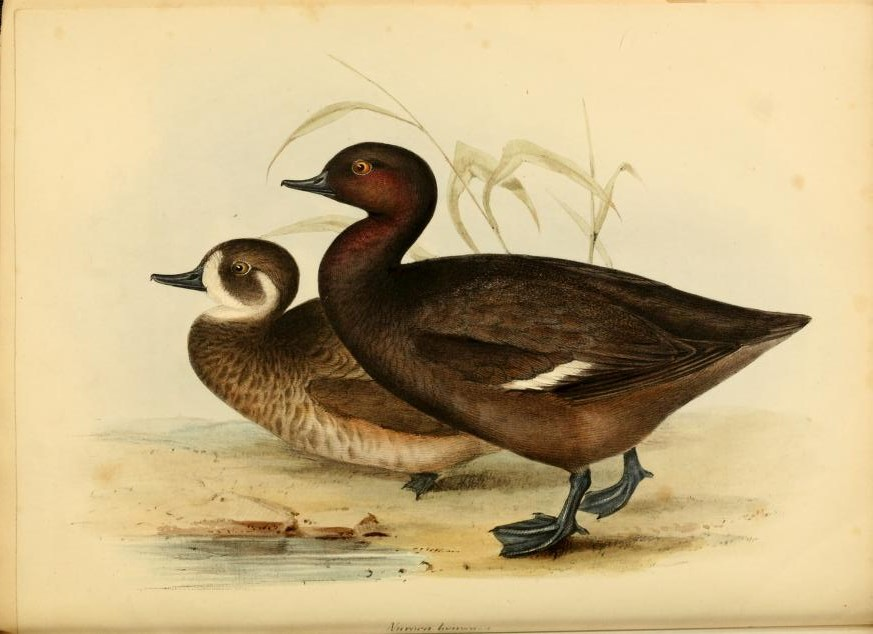
Nyroca brunnea

== Habitat and distribution ==
The southern pochard typically lives in still freshwater (sometimes brackish) environments with an abundance of submerged vegetation. The water may be shallow or deep, temporary or permanent, and range from pools to lakes. The birds are rarely seen on land, although there have been recent reports in reservoirs and rice paddy fields. They typically avoid turbid waters as well as very shallow ponds or floods.

The Aythyini tribe is thought to have originated in the Northern hemisphere, where a trans-equatorial radiation of a southern pochard ancestor led to its evolution. Although they are considered an extant species throughout western South America, there have been reports asking to change their status in Ecuador to Critically Endangered, as it seemingly exists only as a vagrant from eastern South America, and is effectively extinct. They are still classified as a resident species (present throughout the year) in Colombia as well, even though sightings are incredibly rare in both countries. In Ecuador, one had not been seen since 1956, until a female was observed on March 19, 2021. This same individual was thought to have been observed in Colombia in February 2020, due to the facial markings and rarity in both countries. In Argentina, the birds are classified as a rare or vulnerable population on the national level.

== Behaviour and ecology ==
Southern pochards are sociable and gregarious. They have been seen in groups of up to 5,000. They congregate in larger groups during the dry season because water bodies are less numerous and smaller. The birds undergo a complete molt between August and September for approximately 31 days, where they are completely flightless. During this time, they stay in flocks on open water or close to vegetation beds if solitary. They are both diurnal and nocturnal, but are most active at dawn and dusk (crepuscular).

=== Diving ===
They typically feed near the shore, in shallow waters. They sometimes paddle with their beak in the water, eating what they can reach at the surface, and they may also dive for short periods. During diving, a bird’s heart rate decreases from approximately 185 beats per minute to 57, then increases to 213 after resurfacing. Simultaneously, the lactate concentration in its blood increases. This is due to the fact that the body is undergoing anaerobic glycolysis to obtain energy after running out of oxygen. After surfacing, the bird’s heart rate increases, allowing the body to intake the lost oxygen quickly.

=== Mating and nesting ===
The birds are solitary nesters, building nests out of leaves and stems on the banks of a river surrounded by vegetation. They prefer tall aquatic plants such as reeds, sedges, and papyrus. The nest may be above water, along the bank, or a short distance from the water. The female southern pochard lays a clutch consisting of six to fifteen eggs. The female incubates the eggs for 20 to 28 days. Once the eggs hatch, the mother leads them immediately to water. In the middle of the year, populations congregate in the centre of their range for mating, specifically in Zambia and Tanzania. Although they typically remain in large flocks during non-breeding, pairs or lone birds split off during breeding.

=== Social behaviour ===
The male ducks may form a courting group, and display for the females together. One drake lifts their body above the water and shakes or flaps their wings, and the others will mimic the behaviour. Courting rituals mainly consist of parallel head-bopping. Both sexes perform the action of “inciting”: fully extending and withdrawing their neck, often a repeated motion while swimming.

=== Diet ===
The southern pochard eats mainly submerged aquatic plants, which it finds when diving. The adults also feed on larvae, pupae, aquatic animals and plant material. The plant material may consist of seeds, roots, and shoreline vegetation, while animals in their diet can include aquatic beetles, snails, ants, true bugs, and crustaceans such as shrimp.

=== Migration ===
The southern pochard is classified as Not a Migrant by the IUCN, even though it may occasionally migrate either long or short distances within the southern African range. They are thought to migrate northwards during the dry season, and to their central range during breeding season.

== Threats and survival ==
The South American population is the most threatened, especially due to habitat degradation in the form of soil erosion and siltation by dredging. The African population is threatened primarily by agricultural expansion into wetlands, and by being caught in gill nets. The species is susceptible to avian botulism, and may be threatened by an outbreak.

== Conservation status ==
The southern pochard population has been steadily declining since the 1970s, particularly in the Andes, Caribbean coast, and Pacific lowlands. In 2016, the number of southern pochards was reported at around 25,000 in South America, but this could have been an overestimate due to a lack of data. The South American subspecies is rarer than the African subspecies, where natives have practically disappeared from Colombia, Peru, and Ecuador. Recently, they have only been observed on eBird in Brazil and small areas of Venezuela. Reports in Venezuela have been increasing since 2022, especially in Barquisimeto, where flocks of up to 8 individuals have been observed in 2025. The southern pochard is considered of Least Concern by the IUCN because of its large range, which does not account for the status of each subspecies or population. There are 8 Important or Key Bird and Biodiversity Areas for the species, all in southern Africa.

== Relationship to humans ==
Locally and nationally, the southern pochard are used by humans for food. Internationally, they may be used as pets.
