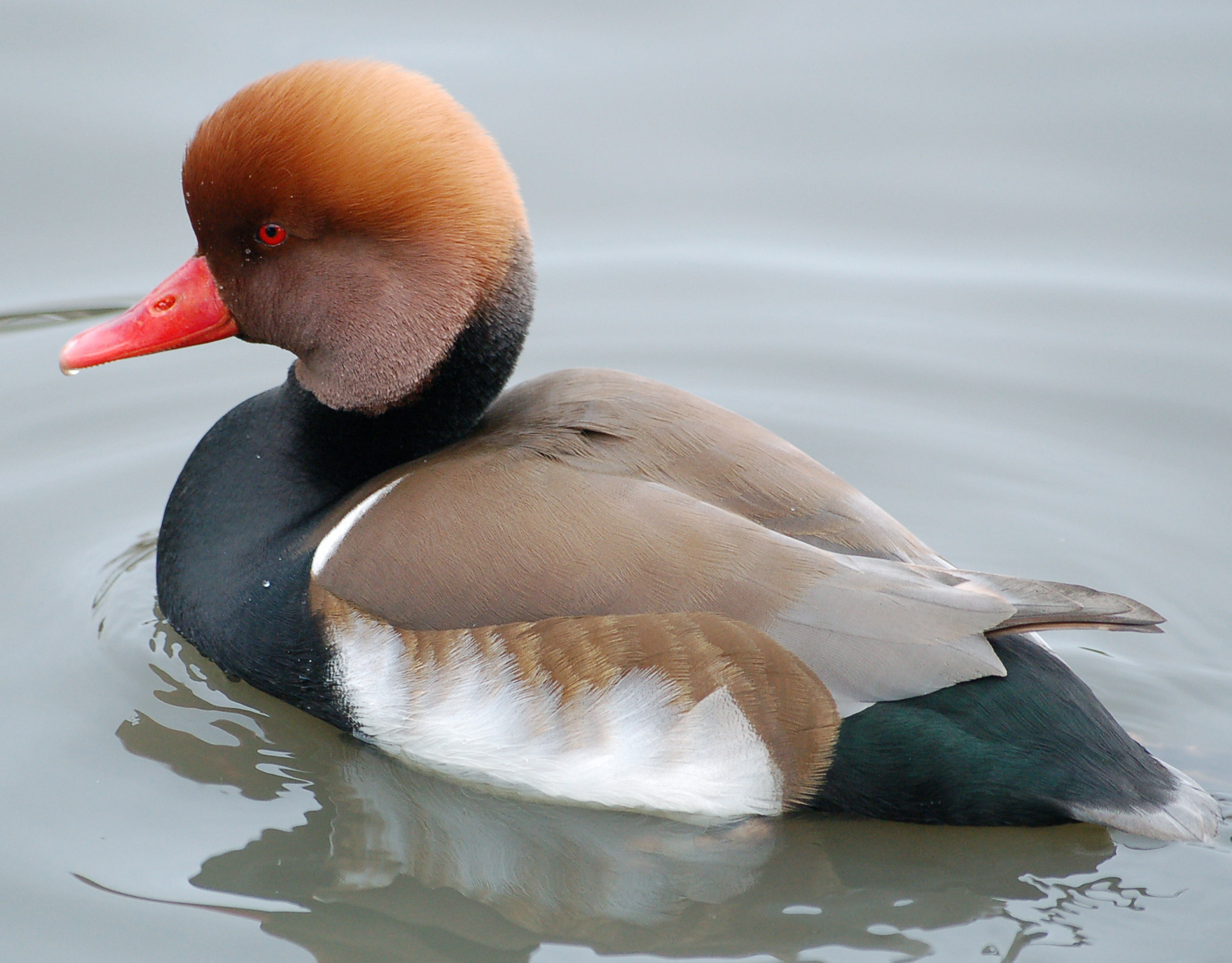
- Red-crested pochard

Scientific classification
- Kingdom: Animalia
- Phylum: Chordata
- Class: Aves
- Order: Anseriformes
- Family: Anatidae
- Subfamily: Aythyinae
- Genus: Netta; Kaup, 1829

Type species
- Anas rufina Pallas, 1773

Species
- Netta rufina (red-crested pochard); Netta erythrophthalma (southern pochard); Netta peposaca (rosy-billed pochard)

Synonyms
- Metopiana

= Netta =

Genus of birds

Netta is a genus of diving ducks. The name is derived from Greek Netta "duck". Unlike other diving ducks, the Netta species are reluctant to dive, and feed more like dabbling ducks.

These are gregarious ducks, mainly found on fresh water. They are strong fliers; their broad, blunt-tipped wings require faster wing-beats than those of many ducks and they take off with some difficulty.

They do not walk as well on land as the dabbling ducks because their legs tend to be placed further back on their bodies to help propel them when underwater.

The probably extinct pink-headed duck, previously listed as Rhodonessa caryophyllacea, has recently been shown by phylogenetic analysis to be closely related to the red-crested pochard, so has now been transferred to the same genus, as Netta caryophyllacea. However, this has been questioned due to numerous and pronounced peculiarities of that species.

== Species ==
There are 3 recognized species.

Genus Netta – Kaup, 1829 – three species
Common name	Scientific name and subspecies	Range	Size and ecology	IUCN status and estimated population
Southern pochard Male Female	Netta erythrophthalma (Wied-Neuwied, 1833)	South America, Africa	Size: Habitat: Diet:	LC
Rosy-billed pochard Male Female	Netta peposaca (Vieillot, 1816)	South America	Size: Habitat: Diet:	LC
Red-crested pochard Male Female	Netta rufina (Pallas, 1773)	Europe, central/south Asia, northern Africa	Size: Habitat: Diet:	LC
