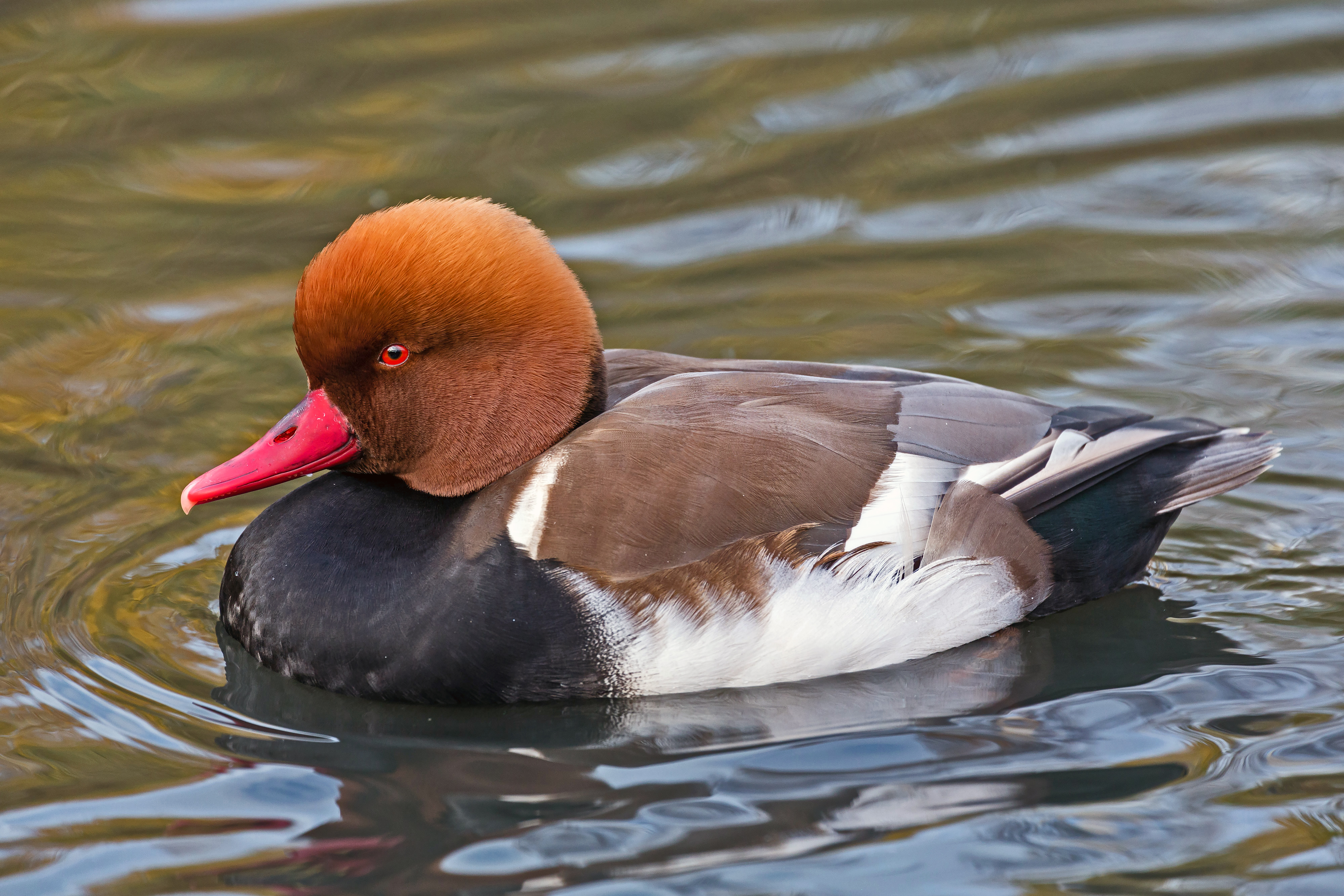
- Male
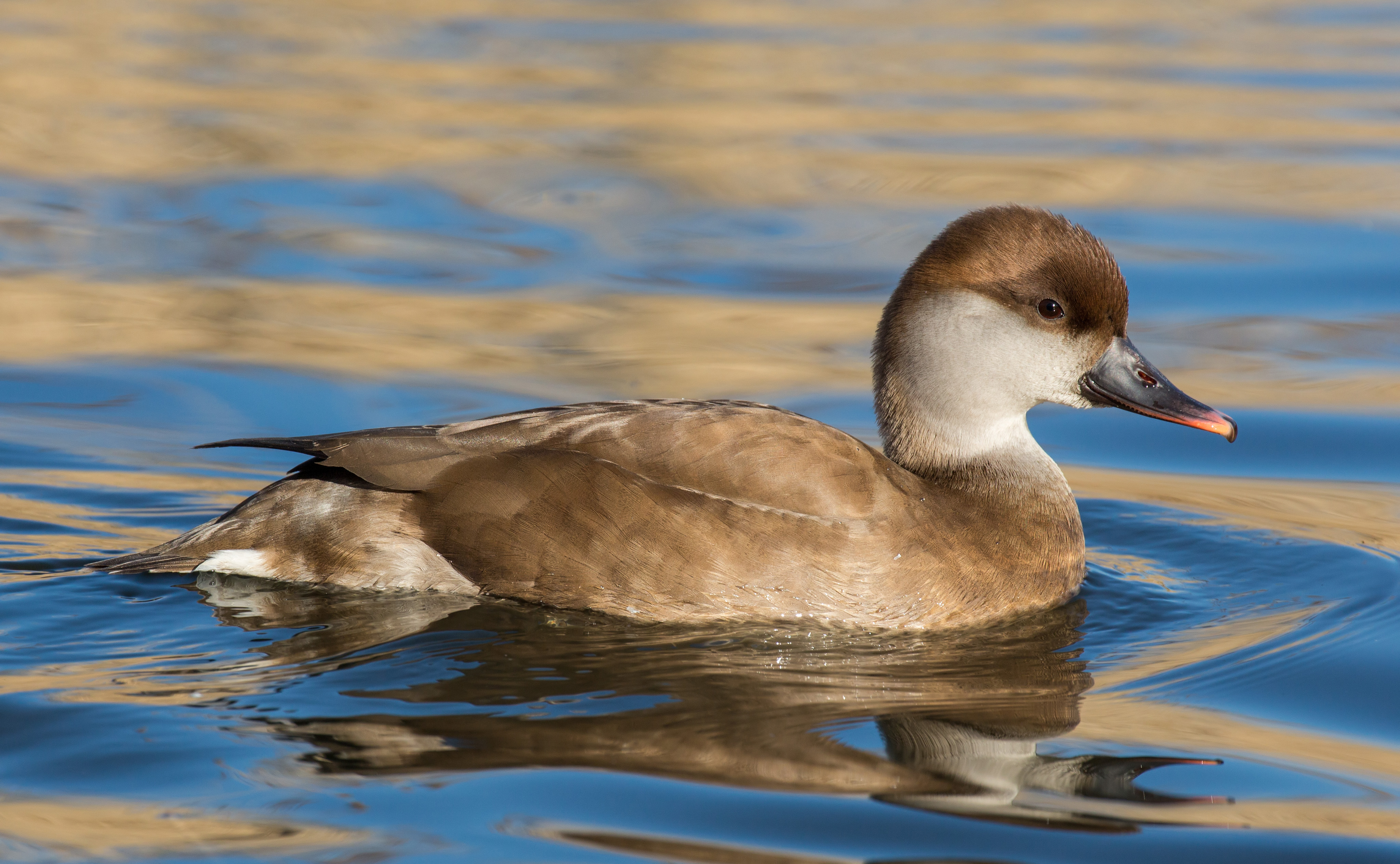
- Female

Conservation status
- Least Concern (IUCN 3.1)

Scientific classification
- Kingdom: Animalia
- Phylum: Chordata
- Class: Aves
- Order: Anseriformes
- Family: Anatidae
- Genus: Netta
- Species: N. rufina

Binomial name
- Netta rufina (Pallas, 1773)
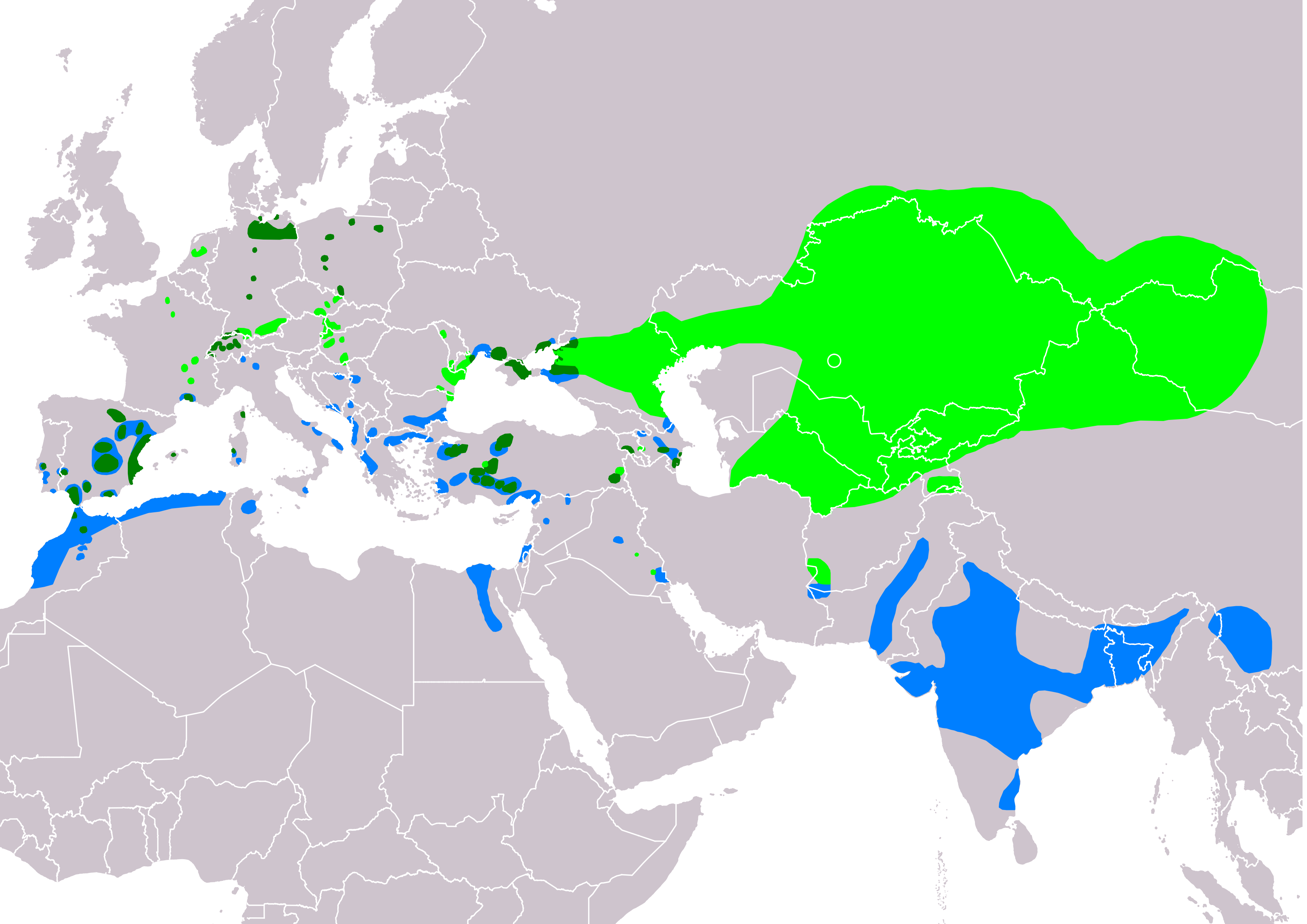
- Range of N. rufina Breeding Resident Non-breeding

= Red-crested pochard =

Species of bird

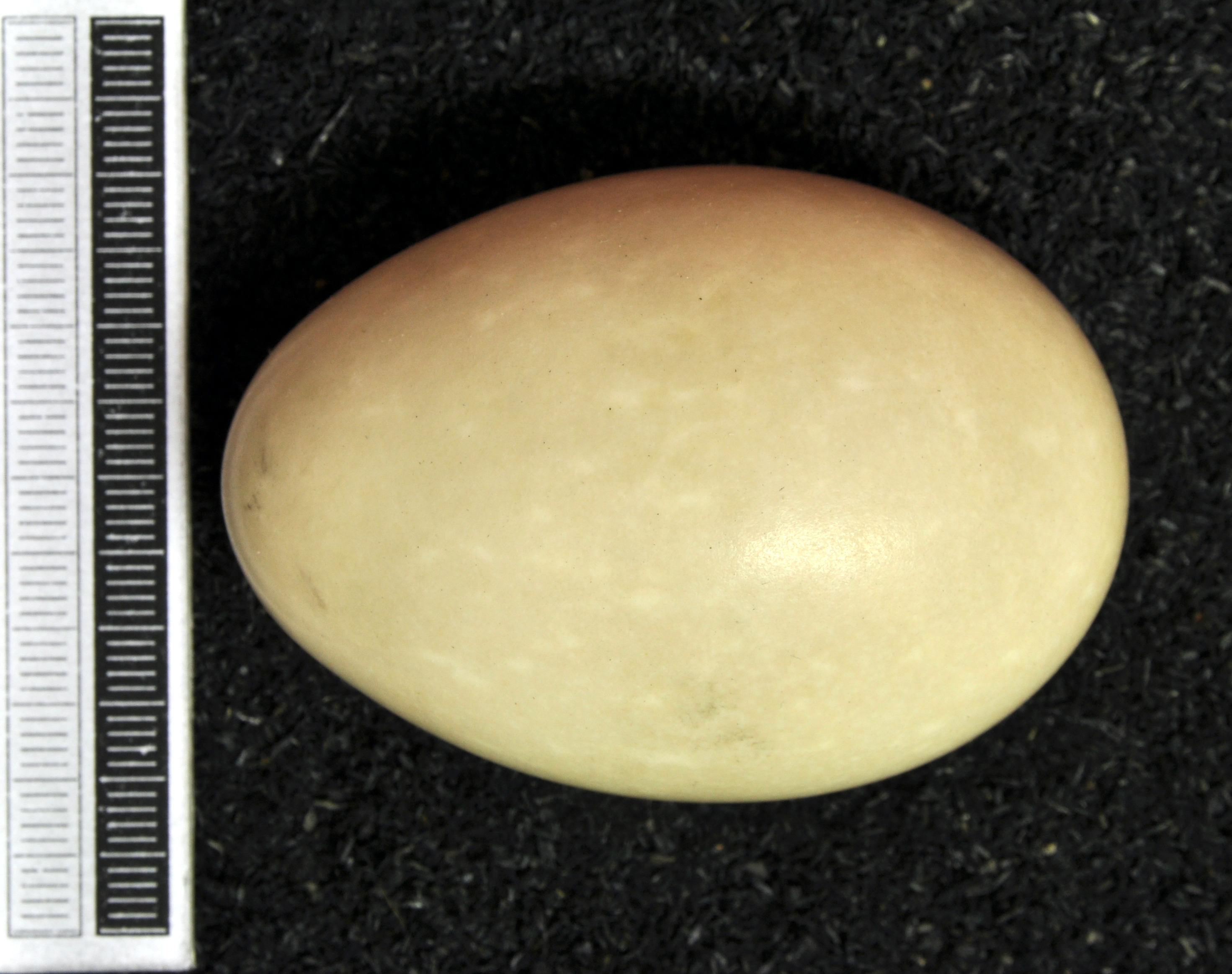
Egg, collection Museum Wiesbaden

The red-crested pochard (Netta rufina) is a large diving duck. The scientific name is derived from Greek Netta "duck", and Latin rufina, "golden-red" (from rufus, "ruddy"). Its breeding habitat is lowland marshes and lakes in southern Europe and it extends from the steppe and semi-desert areas on the Black Sea to Central Asia and Mongolia, wintering in the Indian subcontinent and Africa. It is somewhat migratory, and northern birds winter further south into north Africa.

The adult male is unmistakable. It has a rounded orange head, red bill and black breast. The flanks are white, the back brown, and the tail black. The female is mainly a pale brown, with a darker back and crown and a whitish face. Eclipse males are like females but with red bills. They are gregarious birds, forming large flocks in winter, often mixed with other diving ducks, such as common pochards. They feed mainly by diving or dabbling. They eat aquatic plants, and typically upend for food more than most diving ducks.

A wheezing veht call can be given by the male. Series of hoarse vrah-vrah-vrah calls can also be heard from females.

Red-crested pochards build nests by the lakeside among vegetation and lay 8–12 pale green eggs. The birds' status in the British Isles is much confused because there have been many escapes and deliberate releases over the years, as well as natural visitors from the continent. However, the majority of individuals in the British Isles are the result of accidental and deliberate introductions. They are most numerous around areas of England including Gloucestershire, Oxfordshire, Northamptonshire and also spotted in Leicestershire.

The red-crested pochard is one of the species to which the Agreement on the Conservation of African-Eurasian Migratory Waterbirds (AEWA) applies.
