= Arctic Goose Joint Venture =

The Arctic Goose Joint Venture (AGJV) is a conservation partnership established in 1989 between governments, organizations, and conservation groups to coordinate research and monitoring of Arctic, sub-Arctic and boreal nesting goose populations of North America, specifically the cackling goose, Canada goose, emperor goose, greater white-fronted goose, Ross's goose, and snow goose. Executing Arctic research expeditions in collaboration with partners is a primary goal of the venture, so that the logistics of such research can be coordinated efficiently. One of its main activities is to collar geese in Canada, the United States, and other nearby Arctic areas, such as Wrangel Island of Russia.

The venture's "objective is to advance the scientific understanding and the management of North America's geese", and it operates within the framework of the North American Waterfowl Management Plan (NAWMP).

== Partnership ==
Participants in the project include national and sub-national government agencies and departments in Canada, Mexico, and the United States. In Canada, the national Canadian Wildlife Service of Environment Canada is a participant, as is the Ministry of Natural Resources agency of the government of Ontario and Manitoba Conservation, a department of the government of Manitoba. In Mexico, the Comisión Nacional para el Conocimiento y Uso de la Biodiversidad and Secretary of Environment and Natural Resources are national participants. In the United States, the Fish and Wildlife Service and the Biological Resources Division of the United States Geological Survey are national participants. State-level participants include the Delaware Division of Fish and Wildlife, the Louisiana Department of Wildlife and Fisheries, the Missouri Department of Conservation, Maryland Department of Natural Resources, Nebraska Game and Parks Commission, North Dakota Game and Fish, and the Oregon Department of Fish and Wildlife.

Monitoring of the continental flyways of North America is important for this venture, which also includes participation of U.S. Flyways, and the council for the Atlantic Flyway, Central Flyway, Mississippi Flyway, and Pacific Flyway. Additionally, Ducks Unlimited, Ducks Unlimited Canada, and Ducks Unlimited Mexico (DUMAC) are non-governmental organizations participating in the venture.

== Projects ==
Collaring of geese and tracking them is an important aspect of the program. The geese are collared with a coloured band having a stylised three-character code, the first large and vertical, and the other two smaller and horizontal. For records, the vertical character is listed first. The collaring scheme is:

Species	Collar colour	Location
Canada goose and cackling goose	Orange	Eastern Canadian Arctic
Canada goose and cackling goose	Yellow	Western and Central Canadian Arctic
Greater white-fronted goose	Red	Alaska and Western Canadian Arctic
Greater white-fronted goose	Blue	Central Canadian Arctic
Lesser snow goose/blue goose	Black	Western Canadian Arctic
Lesser snow goose/blue goose	Blue	Alaska
Lesser snow goose/blue goose	Green	Eastern Canadian Arctic
Lesser snow goose/blue goose	Red	Wrangel Island, Russia; La Perouse Bay, Churchill, Manitoba
Lesser snow goose/blue goose	Yellow	Central Canadian Arctic
Ross's goose	Pale blue	Central Canadian Arctic/Quebec
Ross's goose	Yellow	Eastern Canadian Arctic

These birds are common in the Pacific and Central flyways, rarely seen in the Atlantic flyway, and sometimes seen in the Mississippi flyway.

== Impact ==
In October 1995, the AGJV was advised by a group of 50 scientists during the Arctic Goose Joint Venture Technical Committee and Management Board Meetings "to develop a scientific approach to the problem of habitat degradation" caused by an over-abundant goose population.

As a result of conservation measures prepared under the auspices of the AGJV, the main measure proposed in 1998 was "the implementation of a spring harvest in Québec" for the snow goose, considered "an exceptional measure in North America since the signing of the Migratory Birds Convention Act in 1916", and a liberalisation of hunting regulations for autumn Quebec harvest and United States winter harvests. The snow goose had experienced significant human-induced population increases since the mid-20th century as a result of using farmlands as a source of food, which resulted in improved nutrition and increased reproduction, so that migratory staging areas and breeding grounds were strained to support the growing flocks. Grazing and grubbing by the geese removed vegetation from these areas and changed soil salinity. These actions were recommended to stabilise the snow goose population by 2002, and included doubling the annual harvest to 24% of the population with spring hunts and increased quotas. The first spring hunt since 1916 was held in 1999.

Since 1972, Environment Canada has issued annual licences to hunters in a draw from registrations received for hunting at the Cap Tourmente National Wildlife Area during most of October. Lure crops have also been planted at Cap Tourmente in order "to reduce the grazing pressure caused by the Greater Snow Goose on the bulrush marsh as well as on the region's farmlands".
