= Black Duck Joint Venture =

North American conservation partnership

- Formation: 1989
- Purpose: Conservation
- Website: blackduckjv.org

The Black Duck Joint Venture is a conservation partnership established in 1989 to stabilize and restore the population of the American black duck (Anas rubripes). It consists of government and non-governmental agencies and organizations in Canada and the United States. Its geographical scope is the Canadian provinces of Ontario, Quebec, New Brunswick, Nova Scotia, Prince Edward Island, and Newfoundland and Labrador, and the 23 U.S. states in the Atlantic and Mississippi Flyways. It was the first of the three species joint ventures operating within the North American Waterfowl Management Plan to be established.

== Structure and funding ==
The joint venture has a management board consisting of eleven members "with representation from Canadian and U.S. wildlife agencies". It is advised by a technical board composed of waterfowl biologists, which is responsible for project implementation and progress evaluation. Members are also organized into working groups representing each program in its scope.

The management board reports to the North American Waterfowl Management Plan, and is responsible for "overall program coordination, and for developing funding and delivery mechanisms". The Black Duck Joint Venture receives some of its funding from research grants. From 1989 to 1994, it had an operational budget of about CAD $870,000.

== Programs ==
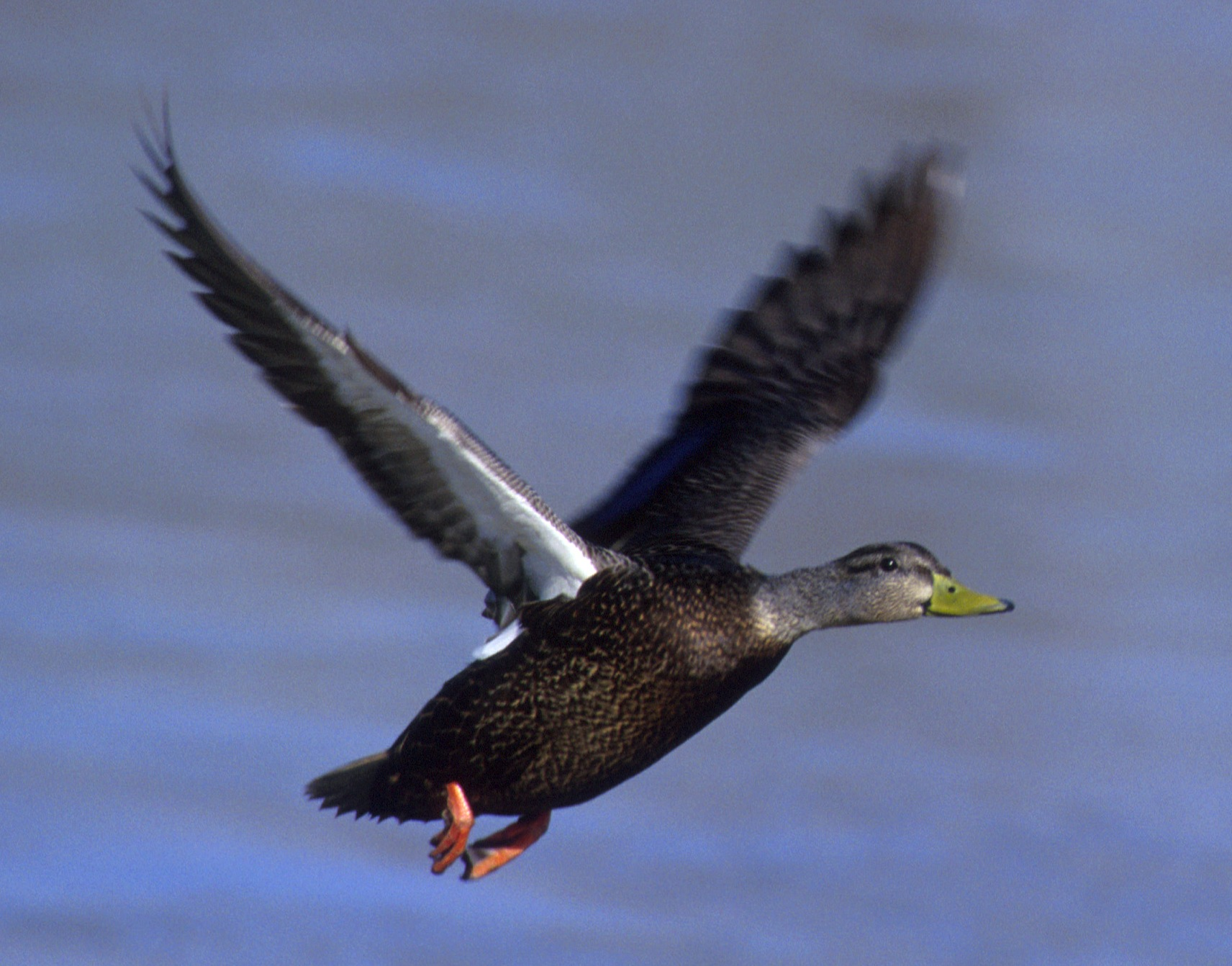
An American black duck in flight

The efforts of American black duck researchers in Canada and the United States is coordinated via the Black Duck Joint Venture, including research related to "monitoring, population dynamics, harvest management and ecological requirements". The current science coordinator is Patrick Devers.

The joint venture has conducted banding and survey programs in cooperation with other organizations, for which data collected is used in harvest management. The program led to more restrictive harvest regulations in the 1980s, which has led to the stabilization of American black duck populations in some areas and recovery in others.

In 1990, the venture began "large-scale aerial surveys of breeding populations" of all species of eastern ducks and some other species to identify trends in breeding populations of those species. This consisted of helicopter surveys in southern Quebec and throughout the Maritime Provinces. Breeding ground surveys have also been conducted. from the mid-1990s to 2002, the number of breeding pairs in Quebec had more than doubled to 396,000.

It was a participant in the American Black Duck Mapping Project conducted at Mount Allison University in conjunction with Ducks Unlimited Canada, the Canadian Wildlife Service, and other government organizations. This research collected data about black duck populations in Atlantic Canada to complement previous research by the Eastern Habitat Joint Venture.

Other research partners include the Patuxent Wildlife Research Center.

In the United States, the United States Fish and Wildlife Service has purchased wintering, staging and breeding habitats of the American black duck (and other species), which it manages to encourage population recovery. This includes over 1,000 acres (4 km^{2}) of wetlands at Montezuma National Wildlife Refuge.
