= Canadian Intermountain Joint Venture =

Canadian conservationalist organization

The Canadian Intermountain Joint Venture (CIJV) is a partnership of "government agencies, Aboriginal groups, nongovernmental organizations, industry, universities and landowners" for the implementation of the North American Waterfowl Management Plan in the inter-mountain areas of south and central British Columbia in Canada, and the south-western mountain region of Alberta. Its region of operation includes "all the mountain national parks", with boundaries delineated by the border with the United States to the south, the eastern crest of the Rocky Mountains to the east, the crest of the Coast Mountains to the west, and the boreal forest to the north. It is adjacent to the Intermountain West Joint Venture to the south, the Pacific Coast Joint Venture to the west, and the Prairie Habitat Joint Venture to the east.

Established in November 2003, it operates as part of the North American Bird Conservation Initiative. It also participates in the implementation of The Canadian Shorebird Plan, Partners in Flight, and Canada's Conservation Program for Seabirds and Waterbirds. It receives funding from the US federal government via the North American Wetlands Conservation Act, from Canadian government sources, from the private sector and from individuals.

Its mandate is to conserve habitats for birds and wildlife primarily in the southern half of the British Columbia Interior, a region of at least 489,000 square kilometres (189,000 sq mi) with habitats ranging from "moist coniferous forests to desert". Ducks Unlimited Canada describes the area as "a landscape of varyings elevation and climate that has resulted in a tremendous diversity of habitat types, including desert, grasslands, shrub-steppe, riparian, wetlands, dry and moist coniferous forests, and alpine tundra". It supports 1.6 million breeding waterfowl of at least 26 species throughout the 20,000 km^{2} of lakes and wetlands in the region, and at least 373 bird species overall, including the entire population of eleven provincially endangered species: Brewer's sparrow (subspecies breweri), burrowing owl, ferruginous hawk, grasshopper sparrow, lark sparrow, prairie falcon, sage thrasher, Swainson's hawk, white-headed woodpecker, Williamson's sapsucker, and yellow-breasted chat.
