= North American Waterfowl Management Plan =

International plan to conserve waterfowl and migratory birds

The North American Waterfowl Management Plan (NAWMP) is an international plan to conserve waterfowl and migratory birds in North America. It was established in 1986 by Canada and the United States, and expanded to include Mexico in 1994.

In the United States, it was authorized by the North American Wetlands Conservation Act of 1989 (P.L. 101-233), and is administered by the Fish and Wildlife Service, with USDA agencies participating as appropriate.

Projects of this plan are "international in scope, but implemented at regional levels".

== History ==
Critical to the populations of migratory birds, wetlands in Canada and the United States had disappeared as a result of development since the days of early European settlement in both countries. By 1985, at least 53 percent of wetlands in the contiguous United States and a minimum of 29 percent of wetlands in Canada had been destroyed. This led to plummeting populations of waterfowl, which reached "record lows" in 1985.

In 1986, the Canadian and U.S. governments signed the North American Waterfowl Management Plan, through their representatives: Thomas McMillan, the Minister of the Environment for Canada, and Donald Hodel, the Secretary of the Interior for the United States. Mexico joined the program in 1988, and became a signatory to the conservation action plan in 1994.

In Canada, the program was officially launched in 1989 with the founding of the Eastern Habitat Joint Venture. The goal of the venture is to protect and enhance wetlands in eastern Canada which are important to migratory birds in the Atlantic Flyway, and to a lesser extent those in the Mississippi Flyway. Later, the Prairie Habitat Joint Venture was created to manage activities in Alberta, Saskatchewan and Manitoba, and twelve such joint ventures exist today. These include four joint ventures to protect habitats, and three to protect species.

In 2000, the NAWMP Science Support Team was established to provide technical advice and consultation to the North American Waterfowl Management Plan. It consists of one representative from each nation, appointed by the Plan committee's co-chairs, and members from associated joint ventures and flyway councils.

== Habitat joint ventures ==
Joint ventures manage and operate programs of regional scope within the North American Waterfowl Management Plan. Eighteen such ventures exist plus three species-based joint ventures.

=== Canada ===
- Eastern Habitat Joint Venture for activities in Ontario, Quebec, Newfoundland and Labrador, Nova Scotia, New Brunswick and Prince Edward Island; formed in 1989
- Prairie Habitat Joint Venture for activities in Northern British Columbia, Alberta, Saskatchewan, and Manitoba, including the Boreal Forest
- Canadian Intermountain Joint Venture - the interior region of British Columbia
- Pacific Birds Habitat Joint Venture - International (see US Habitat Joint Ventures): in Canada, coastal areas of British Columbia

=== United States ===
- Appalachian Mountains Joint Venture
- Atlantic Coast Joint Venture
- Central Hardwoods Joint Venture
- Central Valley Joint Venture - for activities in the California Central Valley
- East Gulf Coastal Plain
- Gulf Coast Joint Venture - coastal areas of Texas, Louisiana, Mississippi, and Alabama
- Intermountain West Joint Venture formed in 1994
- Lower Mississippi Valley Joint Venture
- Northern Great Plains Joint Venture
- Oaks and Prairies Joint Venture
- Pacific Birds Habitat Joint Venture - International (see Canadian Habitat Joint Ventures), includes coastal areas of Washington, Oregon, Alaska, and northern California and Hawaii
- Playa Lakes Joint Venture
- Prairie Pothole Joint Venture
- Rio Grande Joint Venture
- Rainwater Basin Joint Venture
- San Francisco Bay Joint Venture - for activities in San Francisco Bay and surrounding counties
- Sonoran Joint Venture
- Upper Mississippi River and Great Lakes Region Joint Venture

== Species joint ventures ==
Three species joint ventures currently exist:

- Arctic Goose Joint Venture
- Black Duck Joint Venture
- Sea Duck Joint Venture

== Activities ==
By 2007, $827 million had been spent in Canada to purchase and enhance waterfowl habitats encompassing 4.4 million acres (18,000 km²). In total, joint ventures have invested $4.5 billion to protect 15.7 million acres (64,000 km²) of such habitats. The plan coordinates activities with other organizations, such as Ducks Unlimited.
