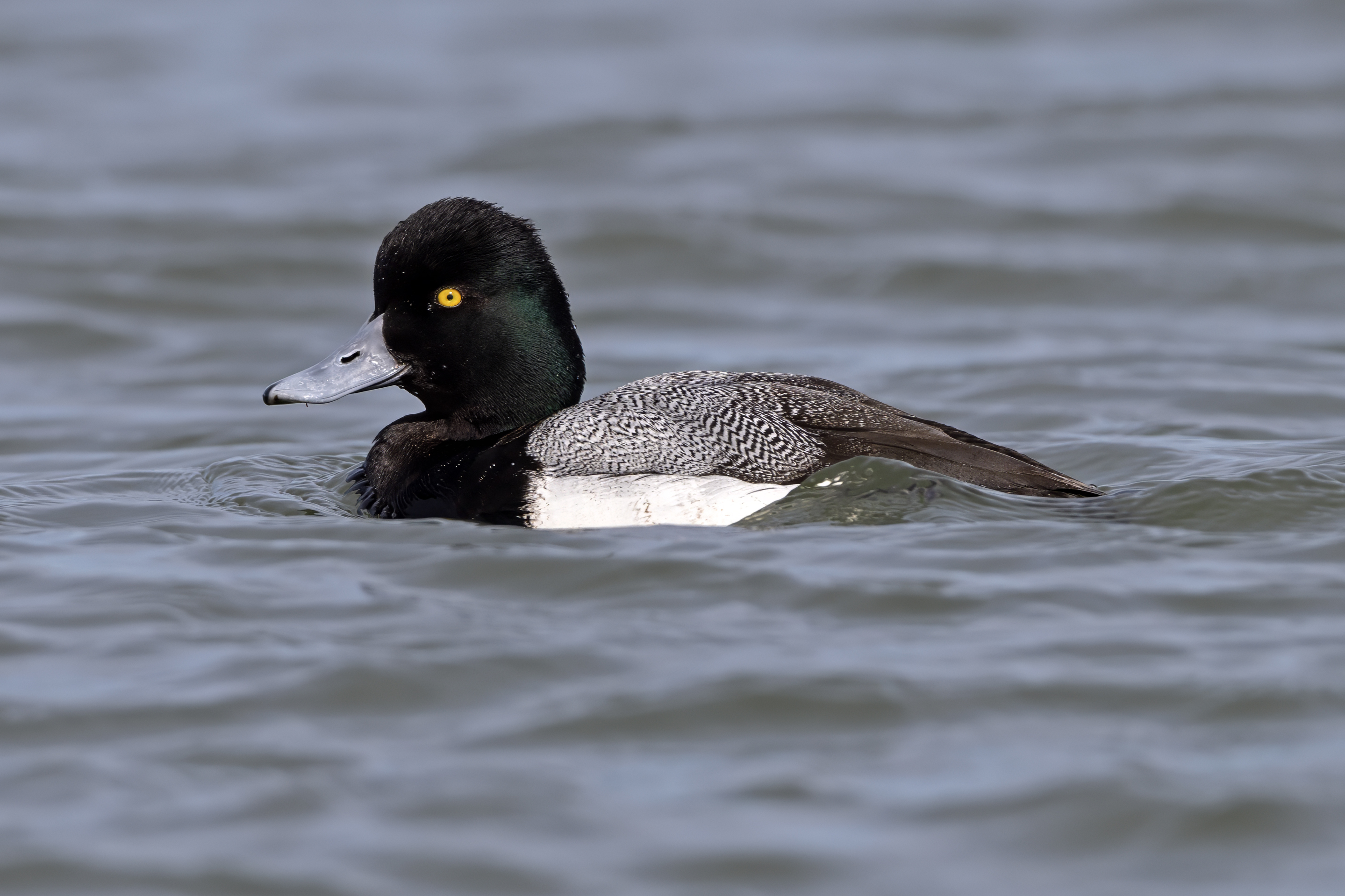
- Adult male
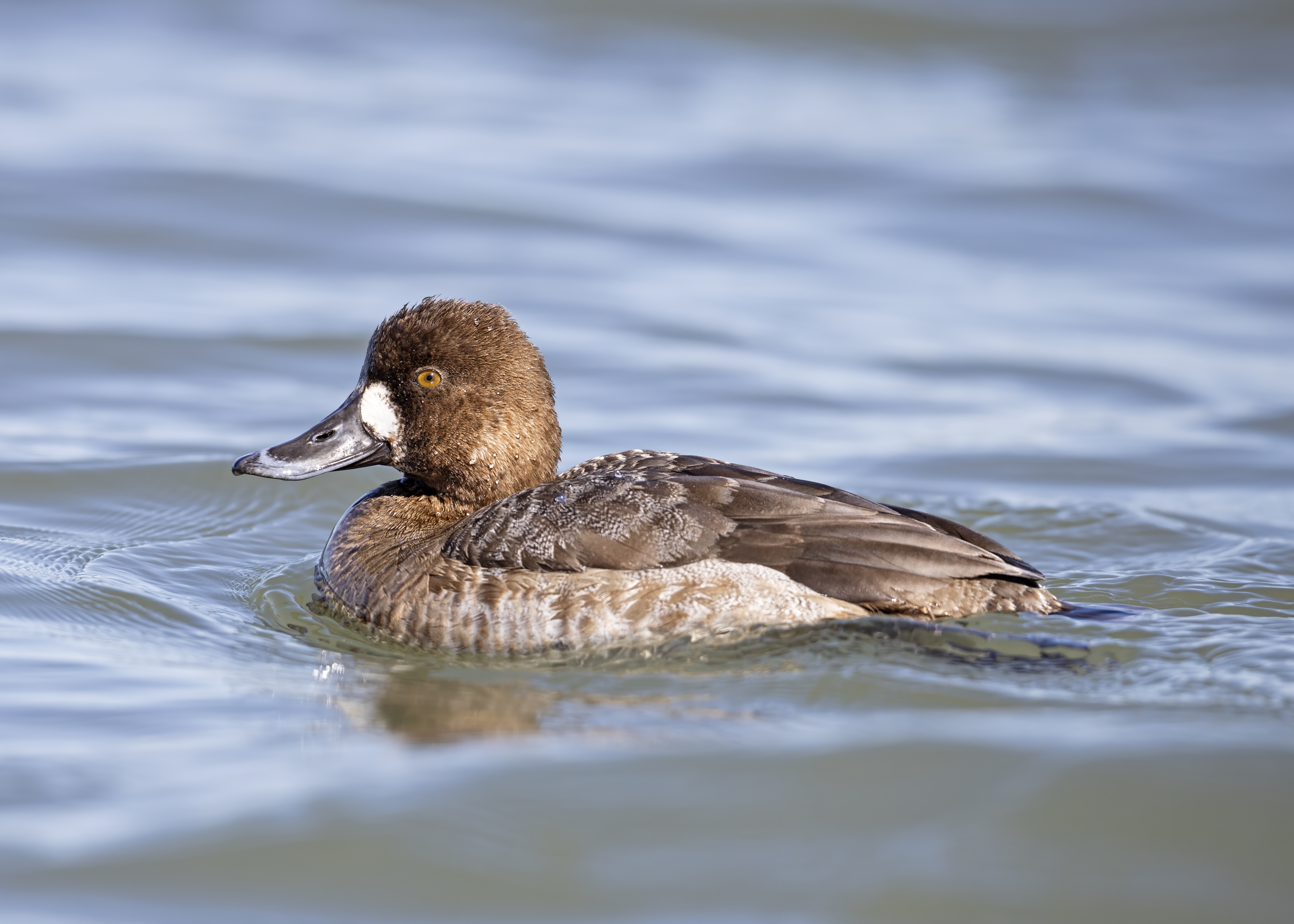
- Adult female

Conservation status
- Least Concern (IUCN 3.1)

Scientific classification
- Kingdom: Animalia
- Phylum: Chordata
- Class: Aves
- Order: Anseriformes
- Family: Anatidae
- Genus: Aythya
- Species: A. affinis

Binomial name
- Aythya affinis (Eyton, 1838)
- Breeding Migration Year-round Nonbreeding

Synonyms
- Fuligula affinis Eyton, 1838

= Lesser scaup =

Species of bird

The lesser scaup (Aythya affinis) is a small North American diving duck that migrates south as far as Central America in winter. It is colloquially known as the little bluebill or broadbill because of its distinctive blue bill. The origin of the name scaup may stem from the bird's preference for feeding on scalp—the Scottish word for clams, oysters, and mussels; however, some credit it to the female's discordant scaup call as the name's source. It is apparently a very close relative of the Holarctic greater scaup or "bluebill" (A. marila), with which it forms a superspecies. The scientific name is derived from Ancient Greek and Latin, with aithuia being an Ancient Greek term for an unidentified seabird, used by Hesychius and Aristotle, among other authors, and affinis, Latin for "related to", from the lesser scaup's resemblance to the greater scaup.

== Description ==
Adults are 38–48 cm (15–19 in) long, 41.7–43 cm (16.4–16.9 in) on average. The species can weigh 454–1,089 g (1.001–2.401 lb); males weigh 820 g (1.81 lb) on average while females weigh noticeably less, at 730 g (1.61 lb) on average. Wing lengths (not wingspans) are about 7.5–7.9 in (19–20 cm) in males and 7.3–7.8 in (19–20 cm) in females. The tarsus is about 1.4–1.5 in (3.6–3.8 cm) long, and the bill is 1.4–1.7 in (3.6–4.3 cm). The wingspan is 68–78 cm (27–31 in).

The adult males (drakes) in definitive basic (breeding) plumage have a black, iridescent head and a small tuft at the hindcrown, a black breast, a whitish-grey back, wings with darker vermiculations and black outer and greyish-brown inner primary remiges. The underparts are white with some olive vermiculations on the flanks, and the rectrices and tail coverts are black. Adult females (hens) have a white band at the base of the bill and often a lighter ear region, and are otherwise dark brown all over, shading to white on the mid-belly. Drakes in eclipse plumage look similar, but with a very dark head and breast, little or no white on the head and usually some greyish vermiculations on the wings. Immature birds resemble the adult females, but are duller and have hardly any white at the bill base. Both sexes have white secondary remiges, a blue-grey bill with a smallblack "nail" at the tip and grey feet; the drakes have a bright yellow iris, while that of females is orange to yellow varying with age and that of immatures is brown. Downy hatchlings look much like those of related species, with dark brown upperparts and pale buff underparts, chin, supercilium and back spots.

These birds are not very vocal, at least compared to dabbling ducks. Hens give the namesake discordant scaup, scaup call; in courtship drakes produce weak whistles. Hens vocalize more often than those of the greater scaup—particularly during flight—but their call is weaker, a guttural brrtt, brrtt.

=== Identification ===
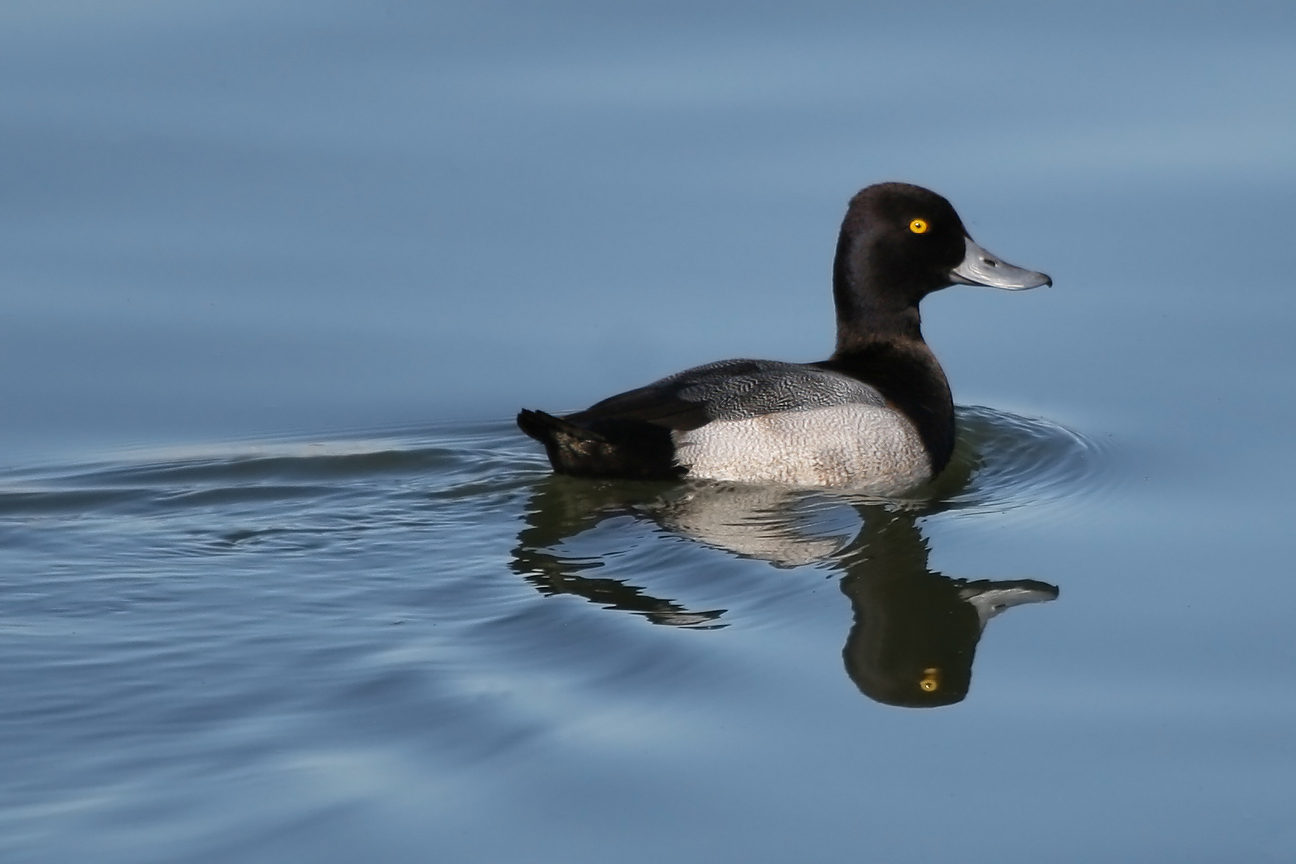
Lesser scaup drake in basic plumage. Note typical head shape; purple sheen visible on neck.

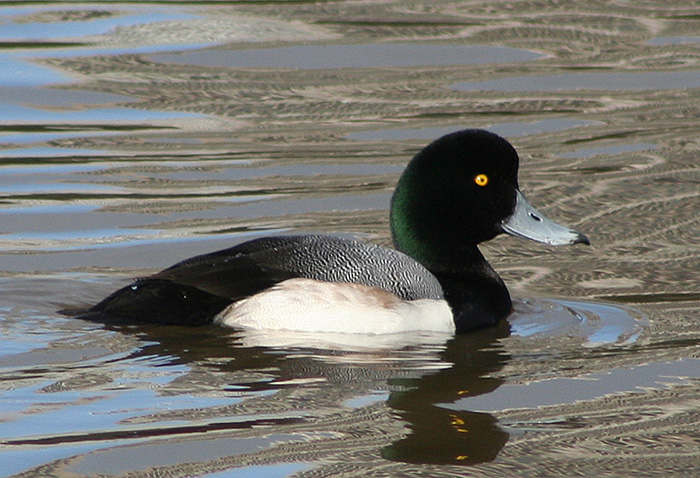
Greater scaup drake in basic plumage. Note typical head shape; green sheen visible on neck.

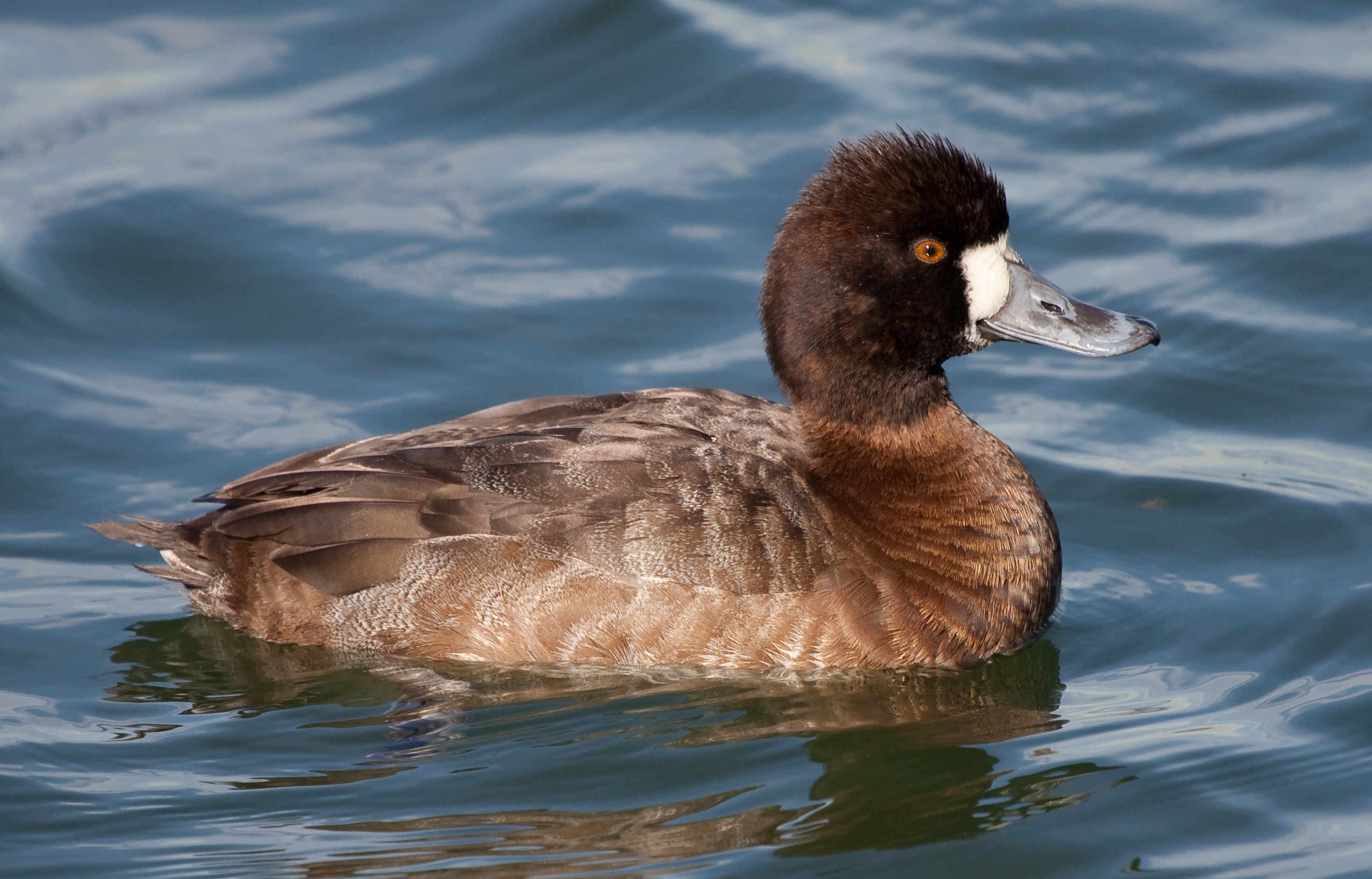
Lesser scaup hen.

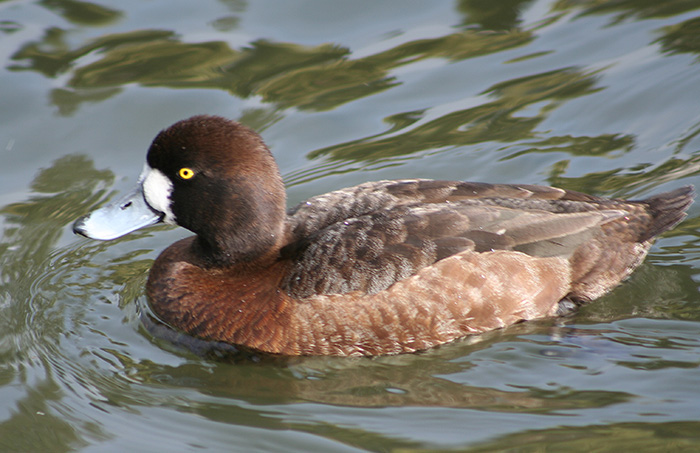
Greater scaup hen.

Lesser scaup are often hard to distinguish from the greater scaup when direct comparison is not possible, but in North America a large scaup flock will often have both species present. Females, juveniles and drakes in eclipse plumage are hard to identify; there is considerable overlap in length between the two species, but greater scaup are usually noticeably more bulky. Lesser scaup females and immatures tend to have less white around the bill, but this too varies considerably between individual birds. Lesser Scaup generally have a smaller and straighter bill, with a relatively narrow profile, while Greater Scaup have a wider, more spatulate profile toward the tip of the bill. The dark nail tip averages wider on Greater Scaup. In flight, the most tell-tale sign is the white secondary remiges, whereas in the greater scaup the white extends on the primary remiges also, i.e. far towards the wingtip.

Lesser scaup drakes in nuptial plumage are often said to be recognizable by the purple instead of green sheen of the head and a darker back. But this is unreliable because it varies according to light conditions, and these birds are often too far away from the observer to make out any sheen at all. The shape of the head is a crucial difference, but only when birds are at rest and not actively diving. In the greater scaup drake, the forehead is usually quite massive (especially in North American and East Asian populations), whereas the nape presents a smooth shallow curve and may appear almost straightly sloping. The lesser scaup drake presents the opposite shape, with a less bulging forehead and a nape that looks strongly curved or even angular due to the small crest. When the birds raise their heads, these differences are most easy to spot, and after observing the two species in direct comparison it usually becomes easy to recognize. In fact, in basic plumage the lesser scaup drake may appear identical in shape and size to a drake of the ring-necked duck (A. collaris); the black back and wings of that species are hard to confuse with the light ones of the lesser scaup male though.

==== Hybridization ====
Particularly in the case of vagrant birds in Europe, the identification is complicated by similar-looking Aythya hybrids. Except for hybrids between the two scaup species, the most reliable mark is the black bill-tip of hybrids, whereas in the scaups only the very point ("nail") of the bill is black. This is even recognizable at considerable range, as the scaups' bills appear uniformly grey from a distance, whereas those of hybrids look two-colored. European hybrids typically involve the tufted duck (A. fuligula), yielding offspring that have a small nape crest unlike any European Aythya species. Female and immature hybrids typically lack the white bill base, except in those between lesser scaup and ring-necked duck, where the white extends to the eye region. But especially with juveniles, the bi-colored bill of hybrids is most diagnostic. Hybrid combinations that are known from the wild and resemble the lesser scaup are:

- The occurrence of hybridization between lesser and greater scaup in the wild is disputed. Such hybrids could only be identified with certainty by DNA sequence comparison however. But while they may exist unnoticed, they cannot be frequent, as the species are largely sympatric and closely related, yet remain distinct, with no signs of significant introgression.
- Hybrids between lesser scaup and ring-necked ducks are recognizable by very dark wings contrasting with a light grey underside more than in the lesser scaup but less than in the ring-necked duck.
- Hybrids between the lesser scaup and the redhead (A. americana) are recognizable by the lack of contrast between wings and belly and the dull brownish head.
- Hybrids between the tufted duck and the common pochard (A. ferina) are almost indistinguishable from lesser scaup, though neither parent species resembles A. affinis.

In theory, each and every Aythya species is able to produce potentially fertile hybrids with any other, though due to their different ranges and behavioral cues given during courtship most of these hybrids are only known from birds kept in captivity without conspecific mates.

== Taxonomy ==
Two syntype specimens of Fuligula affinis Eyton (Monogr. Anat., 1838, p.157.) are held in the vertebrate zoology collections of National Museums Liverpool at World Museum, with accession numbers NML-VZ D826c (female adult) and NML-VZ D826b (male adult). The specimens were collected in North America and came to the Liverpool national collection via Thomas Campbell Eyton's collection and the 13th Earl of Derby's collection which was bequeathed to the people of Liverpool in 1851.

== Distribution and migration ==
Their breeding habitats are inland lakes and arctic marsh ponds from Alaska through western Canada to western Montana; few breed east of James Bay and the Great Lakes. Notable breeding concentrations, with more than half a million birds at the height of the season, can be found in Alaska, in the woodlands of the McKenzie River valley and on the Old Crow Flats. These birds migrate south (mostly via the Central and Mississippi Flyways) when the young are fledged and return early spring, usually arriving on the breeding ground in May. Lesser scaup typically travel in flocks of 25–50 birds and winter mainly on lakes, rivers and sheltered coastal lagoons and bays between the US–Canada border and northern Colombia, including Central America, the West Indies and Bermuda.

Wintering lesser scaup are typically found in freshwater or slightly brackish habitat and unlike greater scaup rarely are seen offshore when unfrozen freshwater habitat is available. They may even spend the winter on lakes in parks, as long as they are not harassed, and will occur even on smallish Caribbean islands such as Grand Cayman. Thousands winter each year on the Topolobampo lagoons in Mexico, and even in the southernmost major wintering location—Ciénaga Grande de Santa Marta in Colombia—hundreds of birds can be seen. In Central America, flocks are present from July on, but only really numerous after September. They move north again in April and May. In the extreme southeast and southwest of the breeding range—the Rocky Mountains region of the northwestern United States and the southern Great Lakes—lesser scaup are present all-year; it is not clear whether the breeding birds are replaced by migrants from the far north in winter, or whether the local populations do not migrate, or whether both local and migrant birds are found there in winter.

They are rarely—but apparently increasingly often—seen as vagrants in western Europe. The first documented British record was a first-winter male at Chasewater, Staffordshire in 1987 but by 2006, over 60 had been recorded, with an average of 2 per year. UK records are typically in the northern parts of the country. Vagrant lesser scaup have also been recorded on the Hawaiian Islands, Japan, possibly China, and—for the first time on 18 January 2000—in the Marianas, as well as in Ecuador, Suriname, French Guiana, Trinidad and Venezuela (in winter), and Greenland (in summer).

== Ecology ==
Lesser scaup forage mainly by sifting through the bottom mud, usually after diving and swimming underwater, occasionally by dabbling without diving. They mainly eat mollusks such as mussels and clams, as well as seeds and other parts of aquatic plants like sedges and bulrushes (Cyperaceae), "pondweeds", widgeon-grass (Ruppia cirrhosa), wild celery (Vallisneria americana) or wild rice (Zizania). In winter, but less so in summer, other aquatic animals—crustacean, insect and their larvae and small fishes—form an important part of their diet. It has been reported that both the lesser and the greater scaup have shifted their traditional migration routes to take advantage of the presence of the zebra mussel (Dreissena polymorpha) in Lake Erie, which was accidentally introduced in the 1980s and has multiplied enormously. This may pose a risk to these birds because zebra mussels are efficient filter feeders and so accumulate environmental contaminants rapidly.

They nest in a sheltered location on the ground near water, usually among thick vegetation such as sedges and bulrushes, sometimes in small loose groups and not rarely next to colonies of gulls or terns; several females may deposit eggs in a single nest. The drakes court the hens in the winter quarters; pairs form shortly before and during the spring migration. When nesting starts, the males aggregate while they moult into eclipse plumage, leaving the task of incubation and raising the young to the females alone.

The nest is a shallow depression scraped in the ground and lined with plants and some down feathers. Breeding begins in May, but most birds nest only in June, later than usual for North American waterfowl. The eggs measure 5.7 cm (2.2 in) in length and 3.9 cm (1.5 in) in width. The clutch numbers about 9–11 eggs on average; up to 26 eggs have been found in a single nest, but such high numbers are from more than one female. Incubation is by the female only and lasts around 3 weeks. The young fledge some 45–50 days after hatching and soon thereafter the birds migrate to winter quarters already. Lesser scaup become sexually mature in their first or second summer. The oldest known individual reached an age of over 18 years.

Before the start of the population decline (see below), about 57% of the lesser scaup nests failed each breeding season because the female was killed or the eggs were eaten or destroyed. The average brood size of nests where eggs hatched successfully was 8.33 hatchlings.

== Conservation status ==
Although the lesser scaup has the largest population of any species of diving duck in North America, their population has been steadily declining since the mid-1980s, and reached an all-time low in the early 21st century. During breeding bird surveys, lesser and greater scaup are counted together due to the impossibility of identifying the species unequivocally when large numbers of birds are involved. Lesser scaup are thought to comprise slightly less than nine-tenths of the scaup population of North America. In the 1970s, the lesser scaup population was estimated at 6.9 million birds on average; in the 1990s it had declined to about half that number, and by the late 2000s it is estimated at 3 million individuals or less. Due to the wide breeding range and the fact that the rate of decline, though remarkable, is still not threatening in respect to the enormous overall numbers, the lesser scaup is classified as a Species of Least Concern by the IUCN. An increase of the decline is liable to result in an uplisting to Near Threatened or even Vulnerable status.

The causes for this stark—though not threatening yet—decline remain unknown. There are indications that the breeding success is decreasing, but why this is so remains puzzling. On one hand, pollution and habitat destruction, especially in the wintering regions, has certainly increased since the early-mid 20th century. On the other hand, the narrow time frame in which lesser scaup breed and raise their young may be tied to some specific ecological conditions—such as abundance of key food, without the ducks being able to adapt. In this regard, it is alternatively or additionally possible that greater scaup, which may be increasing in numbers, is putting the lesser scaup under increasingly severe competition.

However, it seems that greater scaup eats larger food items on average, and the species are sympatric in part of their range and presumably have been for millennia without any problems due to competition. The experience of the past as well as the reproduction rate—even if this is declining—suggests that hunting has no major impact on lesser scaup populations at present either. Also, the breeding habitat is mainly in regions little-used by humans; habitat destruction on the breeding grounds is also not considered to be problematic.
