= Intermountain West Joint Venture =

Inter-agency bird conservation effort in the western United States

The Intermountain West Joint Venture (IWJV) is a partnership of government agencies, nongovernmental organizations, and other public and private landowners for the conservation of bird habitats in the inter-mountain areas of the western United States. It was established in 1994 and focuses on the "implementation of the conservation goals and objectives of five major bird initiatives": North American Waterfowl Management Plan, Partners in Flight, United States Shorebird Conservation Plan, North American Waterbird Conservation Plan and the National Sage Grouse Conservation Planning Framework. Its primary objective is to address conservation issues for about 40 waterbird species which use the marshes, playas, riparian zones, lakes and other wetlands throughout its extent.

Its region of operation covers all of Idaho, Nevada, and Utah, and portions of Arizona, California, Colorado, Montana, New Mexico, Oregon, Washington, and Wyoming. It has boundaries delineated by the border with Canada to the north and Mexico to the south, the Rocky Mountains to the east, and the Sierra Nevada and Cascade Range to the west, and includes the "Great Basin, Columbia Basin, Colorado Plateau, and Wyoming Basin physiographic regions and their associated mountain ranges". It is adjacent to the Canadian Intermountain Joint Venture to the north, the Pacific Birds Habitat Joint Venture and Central Valley Joint Venture to the west, the Rio Grande Joint Venture and Sonoran Joint Venture to the south, and the Northern Great Plains Joint Venture, Playa Lakes Joint Venture, and Prairie Pothole Joint Venture to the east.

The California Action Group was established to determine focus areas for the IWJV in California, for which it identified: the Klamath Basin, coordinated with the Oregon Action Group; the Carson River and Stillwater Sink, coordinated with the Nevada Action Group; the areas of the Lower Colorado River, Salton Sea, Imperial Valley, Coachella Valley, and Mystic Lake, coordinated with the Arizona Action Group; the Modoc Plateau, Pit River, and Surprise Valley; Honey Lake and Sierra Valley; and the Mono Lake Basin, Owens River, Walker River and Adobe Valley.

In Colorado, it is a participant in the recovery and conservation plans for the burrowing owl, ferruginous hawk, greater sage-grouse, Gunnison sage-grouse, and mountain plover.

In 2008, in conjunction with the American Bird Conservancy, it undertook a study to assess "the effects of conservation practices implemented through USDA conservation programs" of the conservation cover, wetland restoration, and prescribed grazing areas for the prairie grouse, land birds, and waterfowl in the Great Basin Bird Conservation Region in eastern Washington and Oregon, specifically the wetland and upland practices employed in those areas.

== Bibliography ==
- "Intermountain West Joint Venture". California Wetlands Information System (California Natural Resources Agency). Archived from the original on 2010-08-17.
- "Recovery & Conservation Plans". Colorado Department of Natural Resources. Archived from the original on 2011-01-01.
- "Work Plan for the Wildlife Component". Conservation Effects Assessment Project (CEAP) National Assessment. Natural Resources Conservation Service of the United States Department of Agriculture. Archived from the original on September 26, 2006.
- "Intermountain West Joint Venture". Red Lodge Clearinghouse. Archived from the original on 2014-01-04.
- "Intermountain West Joint Venture". United States Fish and Wildlife Service.
- "North American Bird Habitat Joint Ventures". United States Fish and Wildlife Service.
- "Intermountain West". Waterbird Conservation for the Americas.
