= Fox Point State Park =

State park in Delaware, United States

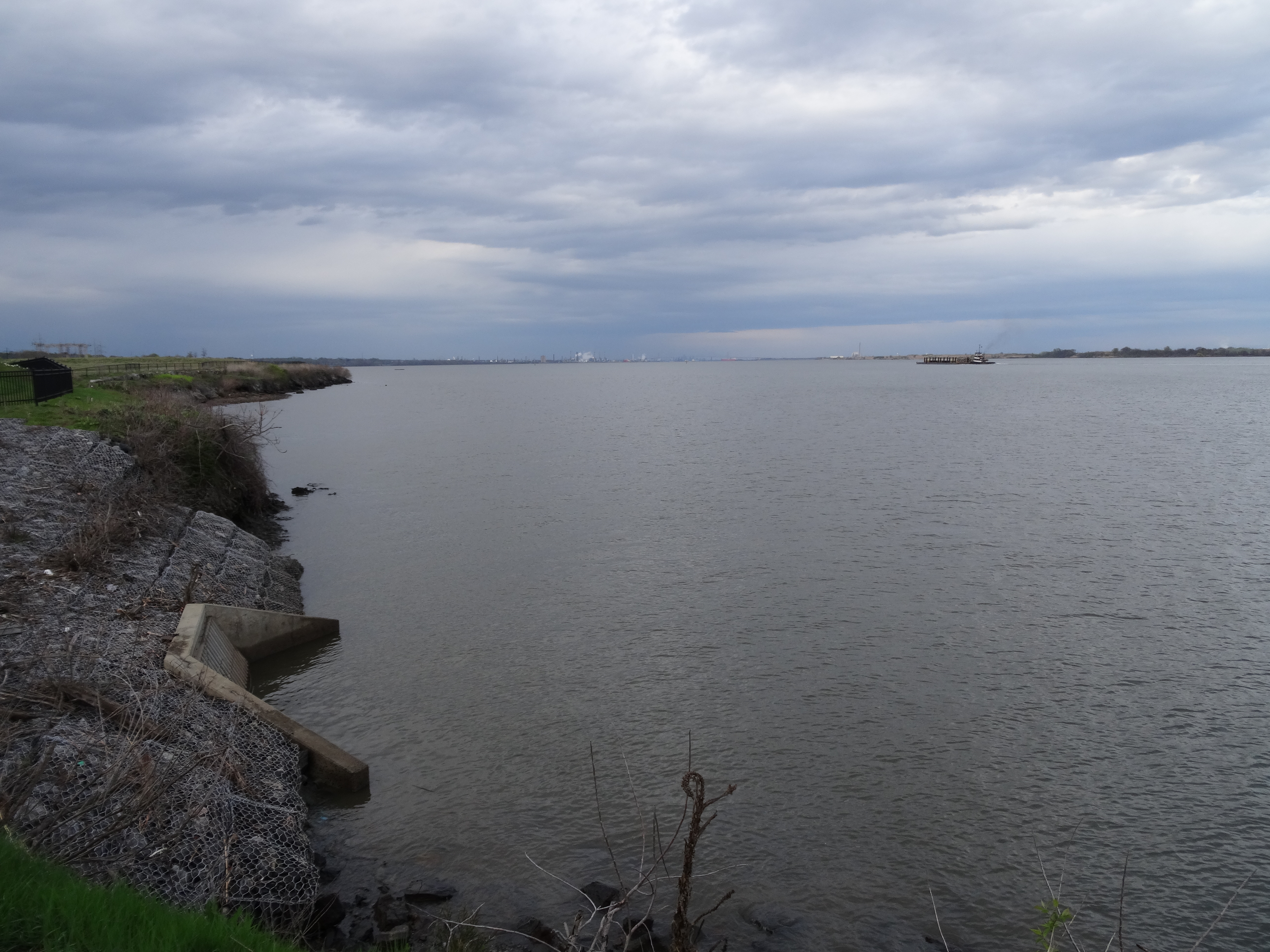
- The Delaware River from Fox Point State Park

- Location within Delaware Location within the United States
- Location: New Castle County, Delaware, United States
- Coordinates: 39°45′22″N 75°29′23″W
- Area: 93.35 acres (37.78 ha)
- Established: 1995
- Administrator: Delaware Department of Natural Resources and Environmental Control
- Named for: S. Marston Fox
- Website: Official website

Fox Point State Park is a Delaware state park on 93 acres (38 ha) along the Delaware River in New Castle County, Delaware, United States. The park, which opened in 1995, was built atop a former hazardous waste site that has been rehabilitated under an adaptive reuse program that was spearheaded by S. Marston Fox and the Fox Point Civic Association. Fox Point State Park is just off Interstate 495 and is the northern terminus of Delaware's Coastal Heritage Greenway.

== History ==
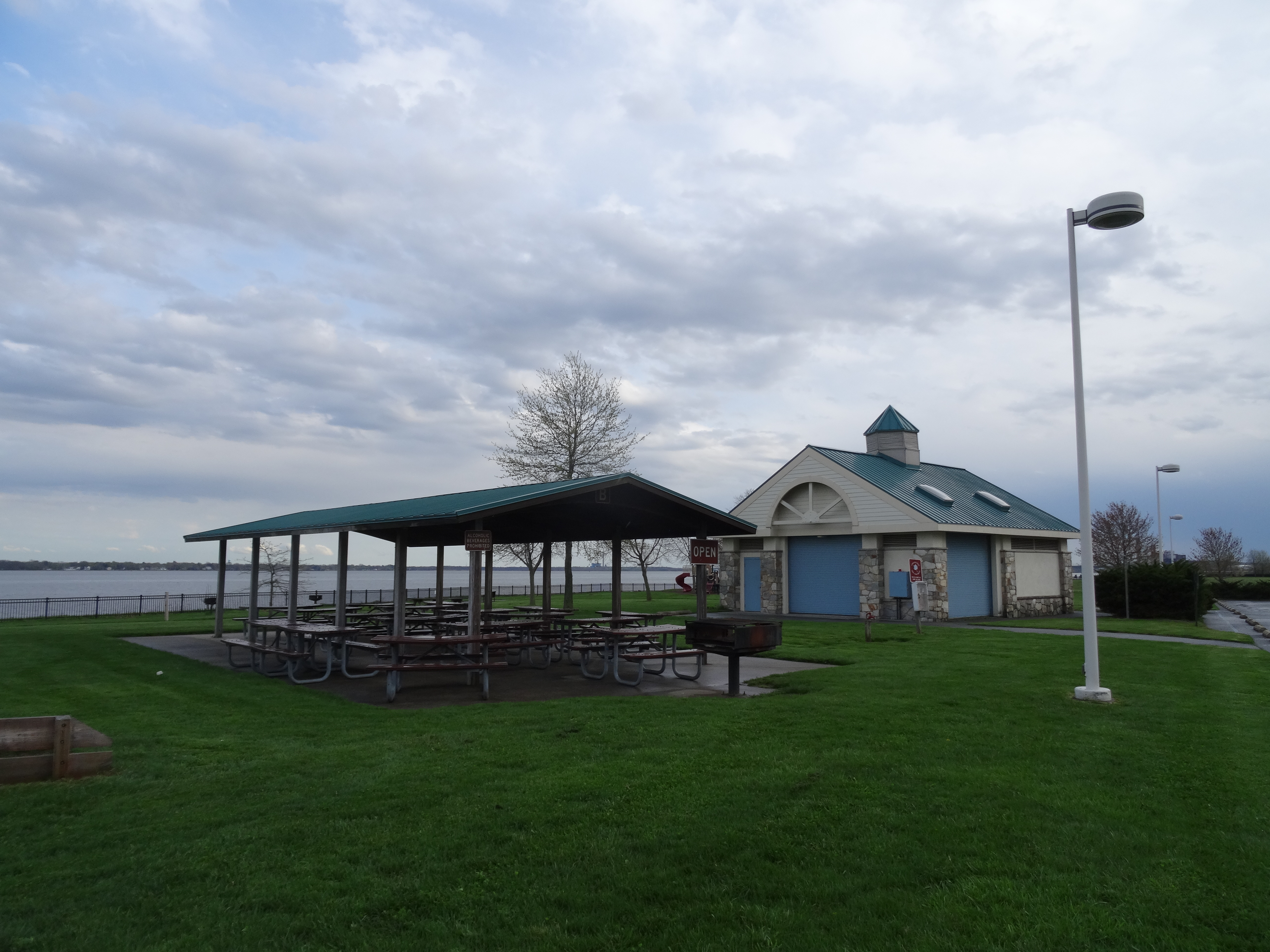
Building and picnic tables at Fox Point State Park.

The creation of Fox Point State Park is largely the result of one man's dream. S. Marston Fox spent the last twenty-five years of his life working to transform a stretch of land along the Delaware River in northern Wilmington. The land on which Fox Point State Park sits was created by land fill by the Pennsylvania Railroad along its right of way on the bank of the Delaware River. The railroad was seeking to create additional industrial land for potential customers. Fox began his efforts to stop the filling process in 1958, and sought to have the land turned over to the people as public use land. The four mile (6.4 km) stretch of shoreline was not turned over to New Castle County until the late 1970s. After Fox died in 1982, his crusade was taken up by David Ennis and Eugene Snell of the Fox Point Civic Association. The state of Delaware acquired the land in 1990 and began the process of remediating the hazardous waste site.

The soil at Fox Point State Park had been contaminated by industrial waste and sewage sludge. Environmental specialists were called in to construct the park in such a way that the health of employees and visitors would not be threatened. Funds provided by the State of Delaware's Hazardous Substance Cleanup Act were designated to use a commonly employed strategy to contain waste a landfills: a cap system. The cap system plan called for an impermeable layer of plastic to cover the 15 acres (6.1 ha) of contaminated land. Layers of clean fill, sand, gravel and topsoil were placed atop and underneath the protective plastic.

The park was expanded when more remediation was performed in 2008. Following Tropical Storm Henri in 2003, the housing development of Glenville was flooded and most of its homes were condemned. Working with the Federal Highway Administration, the state removed 130,000 cubic yards of clean soil from Glenville in order to transform the site into restored wetlands to prevent future flooding. The clean soil was then transported to Fox Point where it was used to cap additional acreage. The project was awarded Delaware's Governors Excellence Award and the Federal Highway Administration's Environmental Excellence Award.

The Delaware Department of Natural Resources and Environmental Control continues to monitor and maintain the environmental protections at Fox Point State Park Sections of the park that have not undergone the remediation process are surrounded by mesh fences and are off limits to visitors, although more of the park land will be remediated and opened to the public in the future.

== Recreation ==
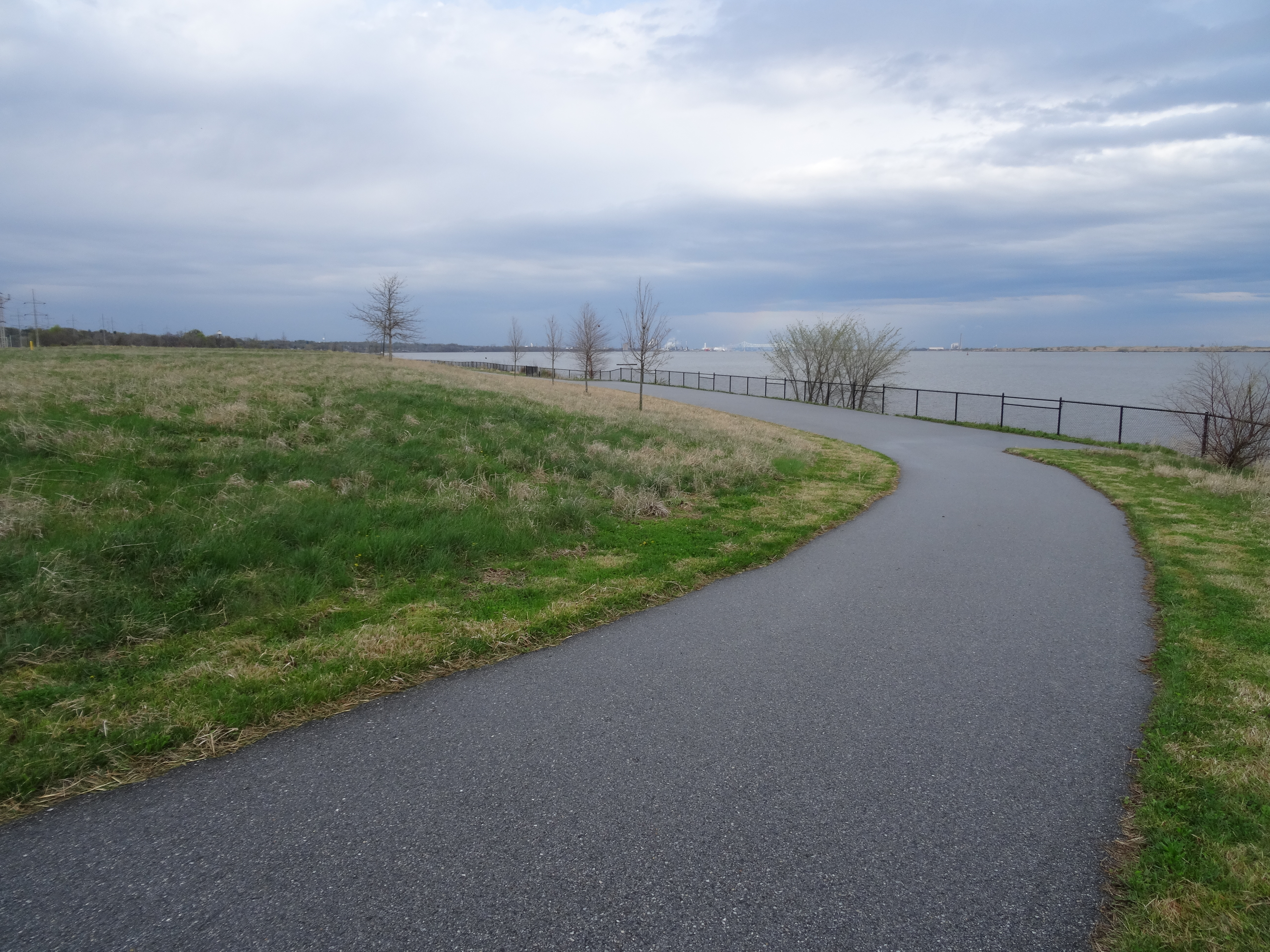
Walking path at Fox Point State Park.

The park offers biking and pedestrian trails, picnicking facilities, playground, volleyball courts, and horseshoe pits. Its location on the Delaware River provides visitors with scenic vistas and a view of the working river. The skyline of Philadelphia can be seen to the north and the Delaware Memorial Bridge can be viewed to the south. The park is near the shipping channel of the Delaware River and barges, container ships and tankers pass by regularly. Signs on the shore of the river provide information about the various watercraft that can be seen navigating the river.

The park is the northern terminus of the Coastal Heritage Greenway, which stretches from Wilmington south along the shore of Delaware Bay to Cape Henlopen State Park, and the eastern terminus of the Northern Delaware Greenway. Fox Point State Park is located on the Atlantic Flyway, which brings a wide variety of migrating birds to the park.

== Future development ==
Plans for further development include extensive remediation of the affected soils. Once the polluted soil is protectively contained, additional park infrastructure is planned. A 0.75-mile (1.21 km) loop with fitness stations will be built. The area on the inside of the loop will be planted with a wide variety of wildflowers. This should lessen the environmental impact and cut down on maintenance costs. Plans for the construction of a multi-purpose building have been written, along with plans for an amphitheater, children's garden, and boat launch.
