= Bombay Hook National Wildlife Refuge =

Breeding ground and animal sanctuary in Delaware

- IUCN category IV (habitat/species management area)
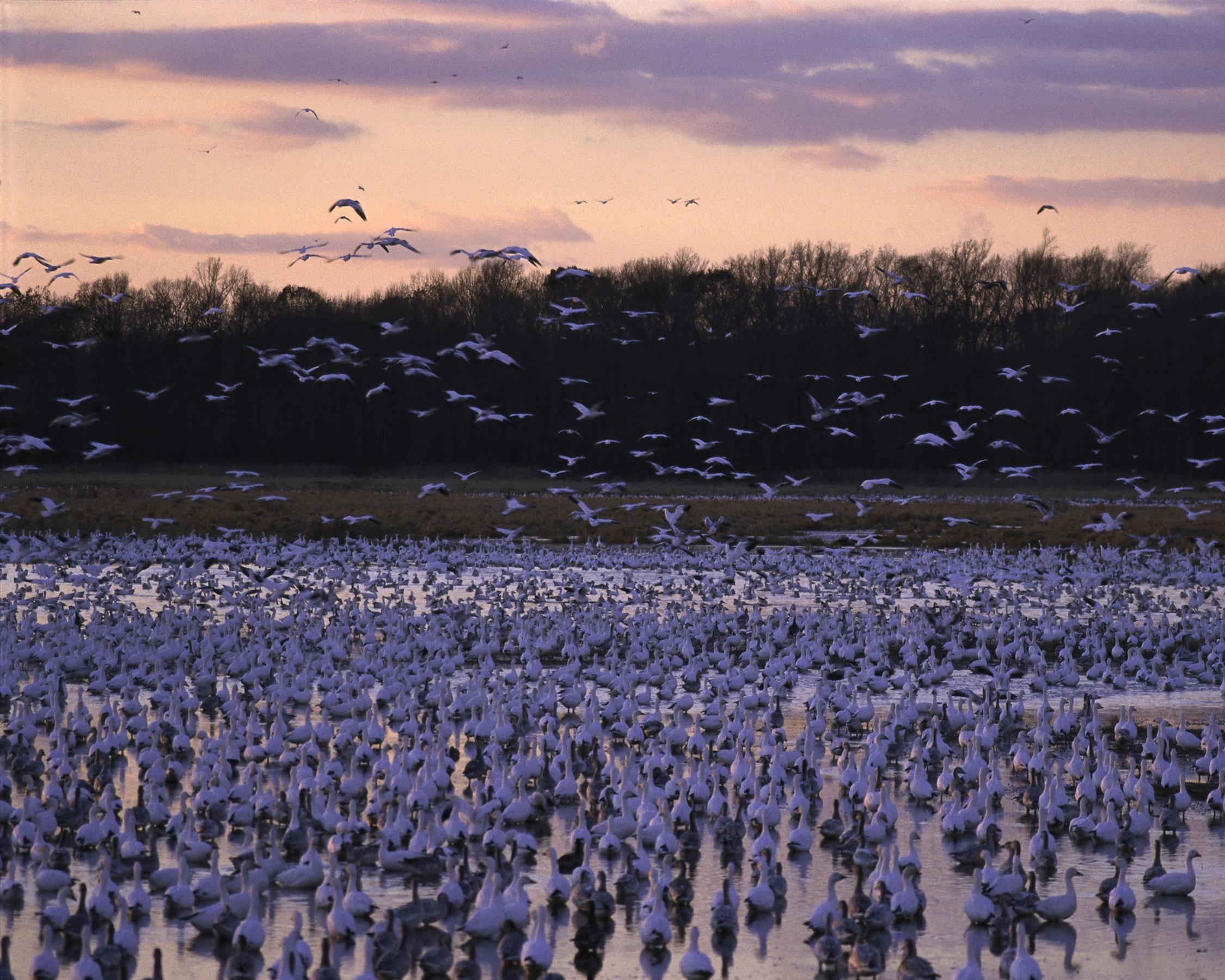
- Snow geese are among the hundreds of thousands of waterfowl that arrive at Bombay Hook each year to rest

- Location within Delaware Location within the United States
- Interactive map of Bombay Hook National Wildlife Refuge
- Location: Kent County, Delaware, U.S.
- Coordinates: 39.259473°N 75.474358°W
- Area: 25 sq mi (65 km^{2})
- Established: 1937
- Named for: Corruption of the Dutch "Boompjes" or "Boompjes Hoeck" meaning "little-tree point"
- Visitors: Open daily
- Website: Bombay Hook National Wildlife Refuge

The Bombay Hook National Wildlife Refuge is a 15,978-acre (64.66 km^{2}) National Wildlife Refuge located along the eastern coast of Kent County, Delaware, United States, on Delaware Bay. It was established on March 16, 1937, as a refuge and breeding ground for migratory and wintering waterfowl along the Atlantic Flyway. The Refuge was purchased from local land owners with federal duck stamp funds.

Today, the refuge protects wildlife of all kinds, with emphasis on all migratory birds. The refuge also contains the Allee House, a pre-revolutionary war farmhouse on the National Register of Historic Places. It is a stop on Delaware's Coastal Heritage Greenway.

== History ==
This area was known to the Native American as Canaresse, meaning "at the thickets", and later referred to as Ruyge-Bosje, meaning "shaggy bushes" or thicket. Bombay Hook received its final name from the corruption of the Dutch Boompjes or Boompjes Hoeck meaning "little-tree point". In 1679, Mechacksett, chief of Kahansink, sold these wetlands to Peter Bayard, an early Dutch settler. The price for the area was one gun, four handfuls of gunpowder, three waistcoats, one anker of liquor, (Note: An anker was a measure of volume representing the volume held in a small cask holding around 45 bottles.) and one kettle.

In 1682, a canal was built from the town of Smyrna to the Delaware Bay; this waterway became the Smyrna River. The Bombay Hook Lighthouse (also called the Smyrna River Lighthouse) was built by the US Government in 1831. The lighthouse was later automated in 1912 and an unmanned light was installed. Arsonists burned the abandoned structure in the early 1970s.

The Allee House, still standing on the refuge, was built in 1753 by Abraham Allee, a Huguenot refugee from Artois, France. It is currently on the National Register of Historic Places. The house remains in nearly original condition.

In 1848, a hotel was built on Bombay Hook Island, making the island a popular resort area. By 1870, the steamer Pilot Boy was making regular trips between Bombay Hook and Philadelphia.

In 1878, a severe storm referred to by local residents as the "great tidal-wave" destroyed summer resorts on Collins and Fraland Beach. The storm changed the biological make-up of Bombay Hook. Prior to 1878, the inner marshes were protected from storms and high tides by the dunes and banks fronting the bay. These dunes were breached by the storm and were never repaired, the effects of which are evident to this day.

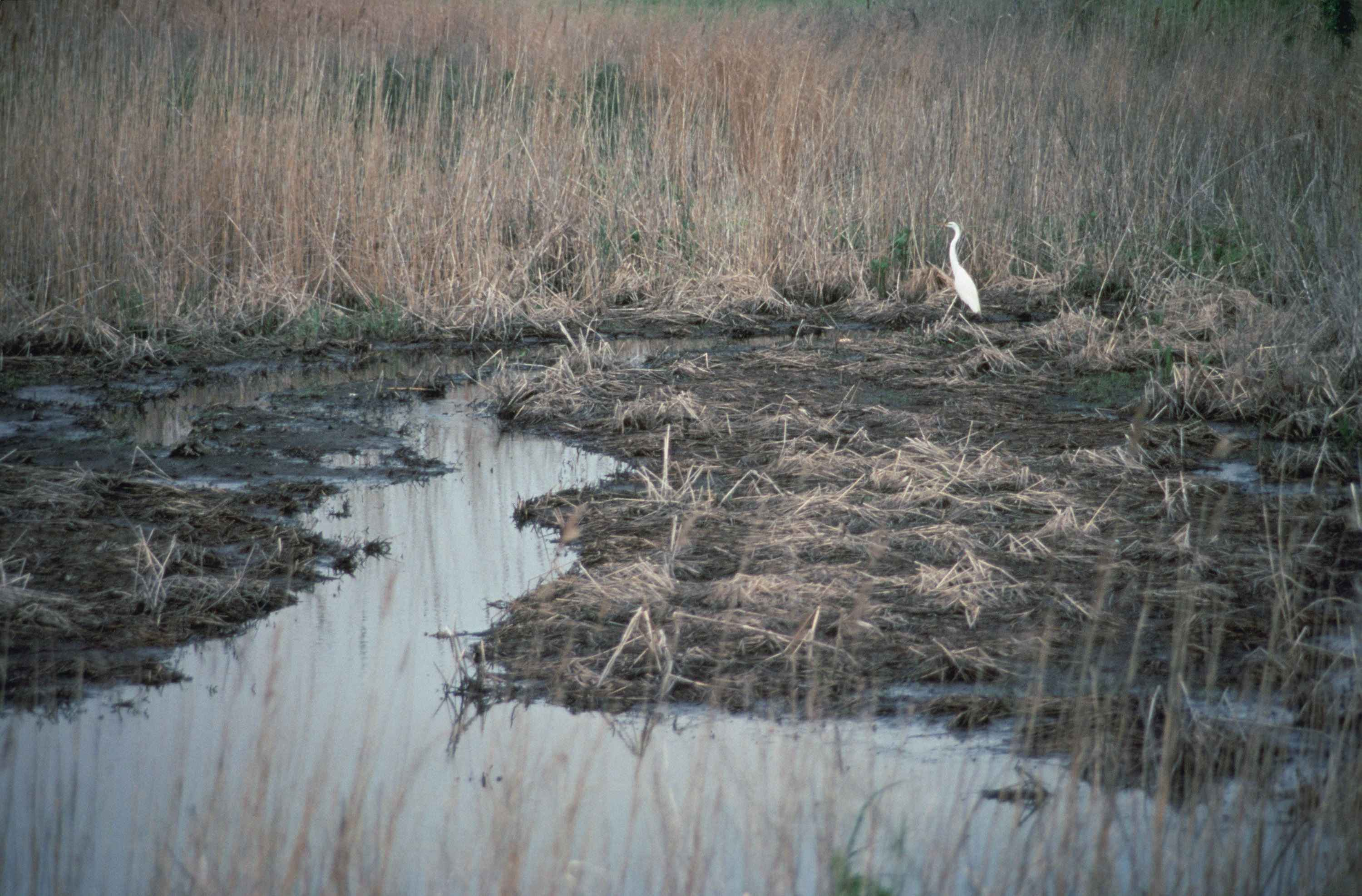
Bombay Hook NWR wetlands

In 1937, 12,000 acres (49 km^{2}), mostly tidal salt marsh stretching eight miles (13 km) along Delaware Bay, were purchased to establish the Bombay Hook Migratory Waterfowl Refuge. The land was purchased with duck stamp funds.

On April 1, 1938, the Civilian Conservation Corps (CCC) based at Leipsic, Delaware started work on the refuge. They cleared wooded swamps and built a dike to create Raymond and Shearness Pools and a causeway to separate Shearness and Finis Pools, creating three freshwater impoundments; they planted over fifty thousand trees; and they built a headquarters building, a boathouse and marine railway, an observation tower, and houses for the manager and a patrolman. They also ran ditches for mosquito control, and conducted various wildlife surveys. The camp ended March 18, 1942.

In 1939, the Bombay Hook Migratory Waterfowl Refuge was renamed the Bombay Hook National Wildlife Refuge.

During World War II, the refuge was used as a gunnery range and for research on aerial rockets. In 1961, the fourth freshwater impoundment, Bear Swamp Pool, was added, making a total of 1,100 acres (4.5 km^{2}) of freshwater ponds that through techniques developed over the years are carefully managed to vary water levels for thousands of visiting waterfowl and shorebirds.

In 1980, an Atlantic Beaked Whale beached at Bombay Hook.

In 1986, Bombay Hook NWR represented the US in "World Safari", a satellite program by National Geographic, BBC, and Turner Broadcasting. Bombay Hook NWR was selected because of its high concentration of snow geese.

In 2015, the Bombay Hook National Wildlife Refuge was featured on the fourth (2015) release of the America the Beautiful quarters. It features a great blue heron, with a great egret behind it, in a salt marsh.

Small additions have been made to the refuge since 1937. The last occurred in 1993 when Bombay Hook NWR acquired Steamboat Landing, bringing the total to 15,978 acres (64.66 km^{2}). Management of the refuge, including development of fifteen moist soil areas, about one thousand acres (4.0 km^{2}) of agricultural lands, warm season grass fields, and habitat diversity has significantly increased wildlife use of the refuge, particularly by bird populations.

== Topography ==
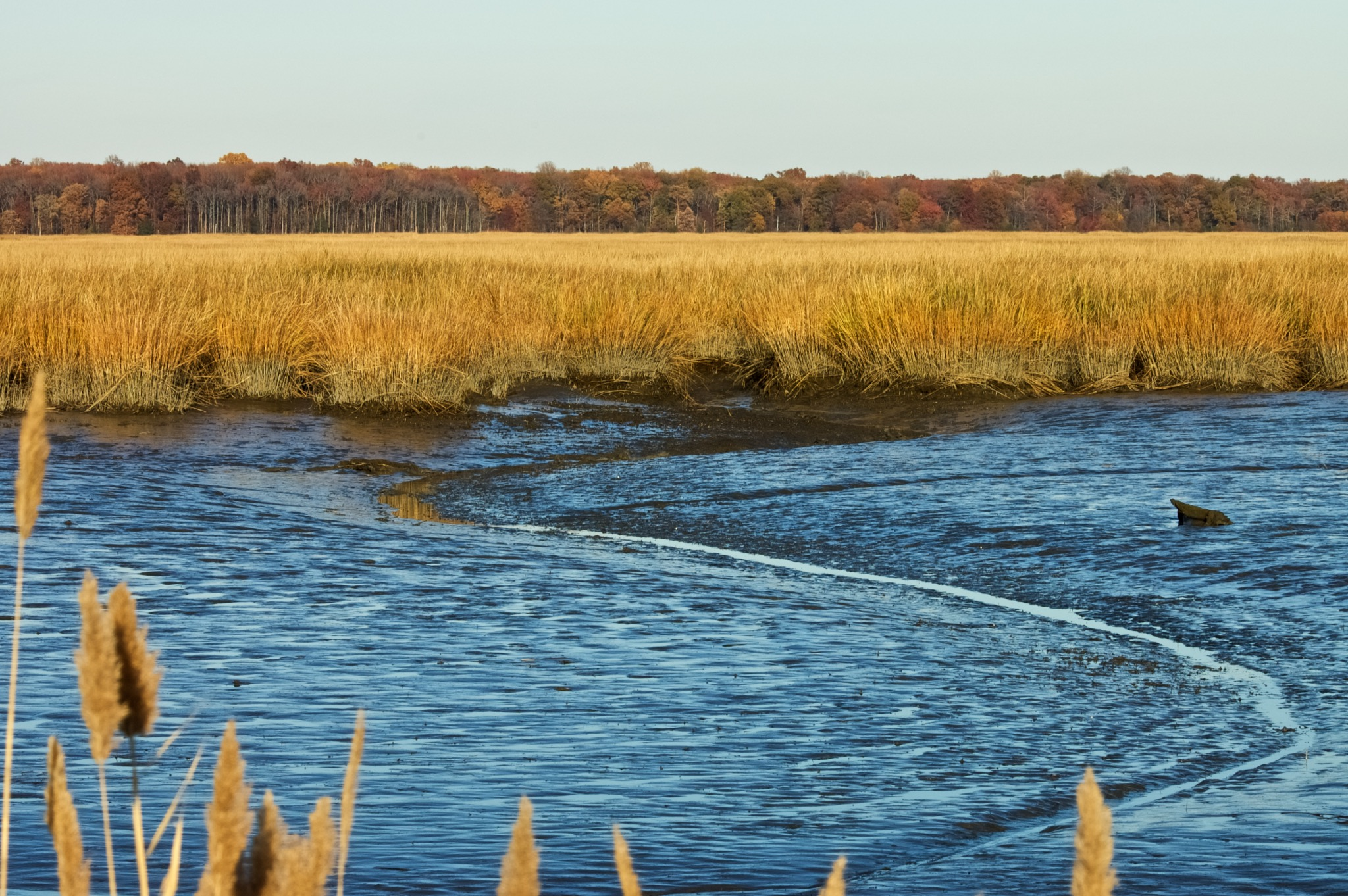
Mudflats left behind by a receding tide at Bombay Hook National Wildlife Refuge

Tidal salt marsh is some of the most valuable wildlife habitat in Delaware; thus large portions of the refuge have been maintained in a near pristine state. The marsh, with its intersecting tidal streams and rivers, provides excellent natural habitat for birds and mammals and serves as a nursery for marine organisms, and provides sporting or commercial value. The water levels in the refuge's impoundments are manipulated to produce desirable emergent and underwater plants for waterfowl. When the pools are drawn down, large populations of shore and wading birds feed on the mudflats.

Upland agricultural crops are grown on about 1,100 acres (4.5 km^{2}) to provide additional food for waterfowl and other migratory birds.

== Wildlife and protected species ==
Refuge management programs are primarily aimed at developing and protecting habitat for waterfowl and other migratory birds, including the threatened bald eagle. The refuge is a focal point for waterfowl migrating between their northern breeding grounds and southern wintering areas along the Atlantic Flyway. Large numbers of ducks and geese arrive each fall to spend the winter or to stopover as they head south. Delaware Bay is also the second largest staging area for spring migratory shorebirds in North America. The list of birds recorded at the refuge is very large, with nearly 350 species, including "accidental" migrants. As of 2009, eBird has recorded 302 species of birds in Bombay Hook National Wildlife Refuge.

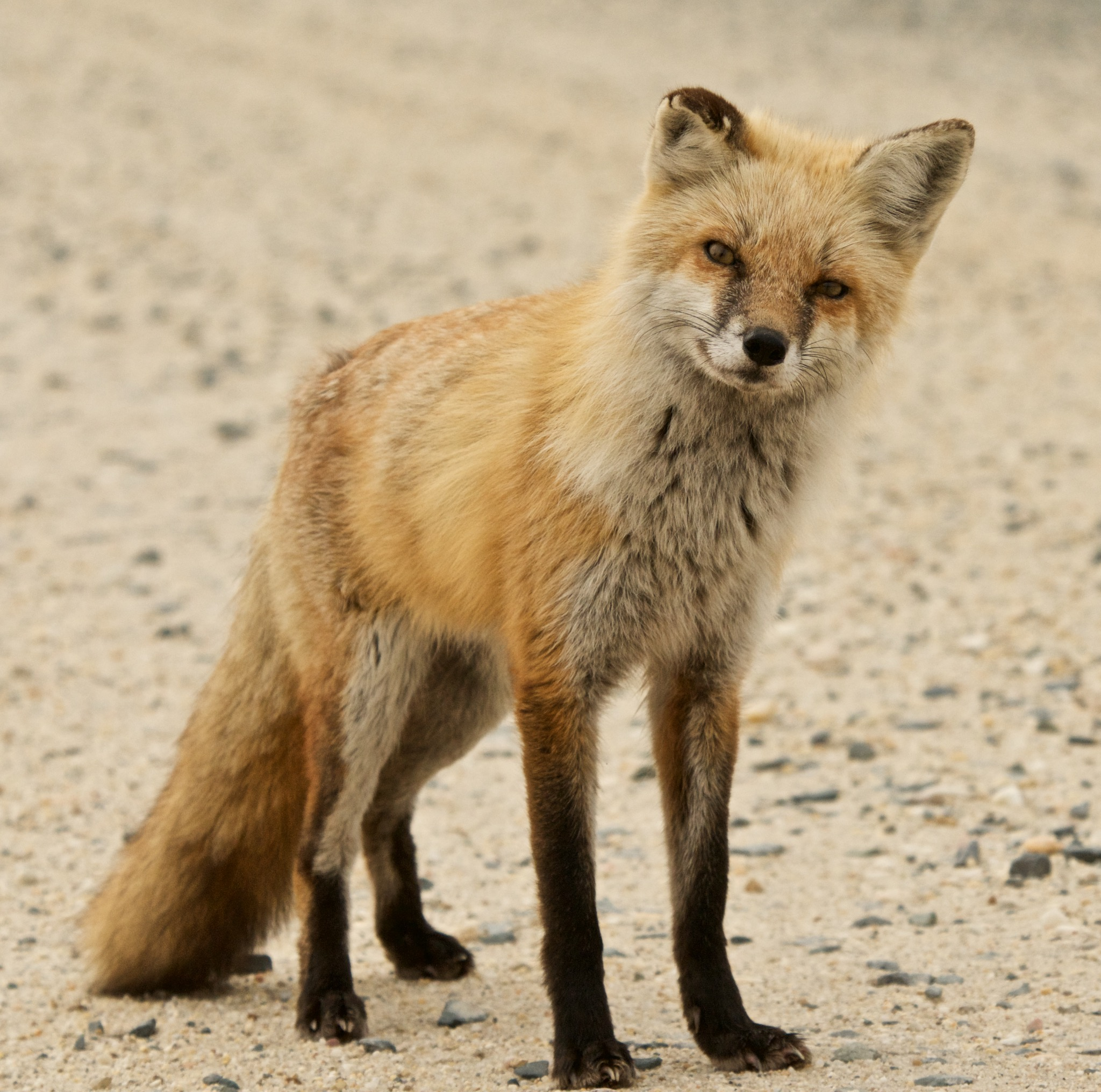
Red fox at Bombay Hook National Wildlife Refuge

The variety of habitats in the refuge provides food and cover for a number of other species. Thirty-five mammal species have been identified on the refuge; however, additional species native to the region probably are present but have not as yet been verified. Those most frequently seen, especially in the early morning and the late afternoon, are the cottontail rabbit, woodchuck, gray squirrel, red fox, and white-tailed deer. Other animals found in the refuge include salamanders, toads, frogs, turtles, lizards, and snakes. Other mammals that inhabit this refuge are beavers, muskrats, river otters, and opossums.

In 1990, federal, state, and private organizations joined to determine the status of horseshoe crabs. Volunteers surveyed Delaware Bay during peak spawning season in May and June. After 10 years of monitoring, restrictions on harvesting were implemented in 2000.

== Facilities ==
Visitor facilities include a visitor center, auto tour route, observation towers and nature trails. There are opportunities for hiking, photography, and wildlife observation. Bear Swamp Trail and the visitor center are accessible to visitors with disabilities.

A 12-mile (19 km) round-trip auto tour route and five nature trails ranging from 1/4 to 1 mile (6,400 to 1,600 m) in length, provide opportunities to observe and photograph wildlife. Three of the trails have 30-foot (9.1 m) observation towers.

Public hunting, primarily for waterfowl and deer, is permitted under special regulations on portions of the refuge during the Delaware state season.

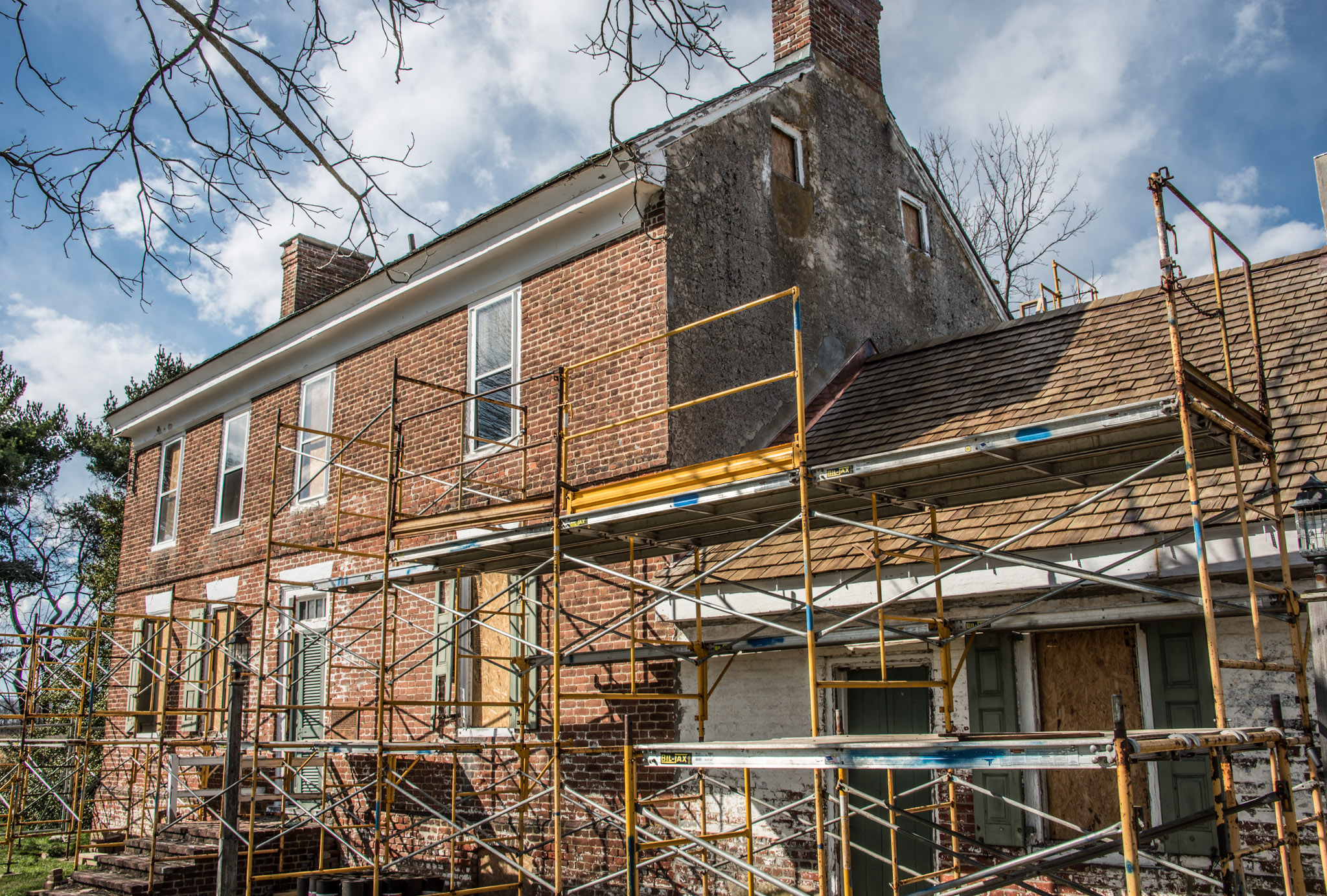
The Allee House under repair in 2016

=== Allee House ===
The Allee House stands as it did in the 18th century, and overlooks the fields and marshes of Kent County, Delaware. It is one of the best preserved examples of an early brick farmhouse in Delaware. The Allee House was built about 1753 by Abraham Allee, the son of John Allee.

Abraham Allee served as a member of the Assembly in 1726, was appointed a Justice of the Peace in 1738, and was Chief Ranger for the county in 1749. The Allee House features fine brickwork laid in Flemish bond with a few glazed header bricks. The interior of the house is distinguished by the handsome wood paneling of the parlor. The cornice in this room has a dentil course that is particularly well formed, and the splendid panels of the chimney breast are joined on either side by two striking recessed, arched china closets. These closets have paneled doors and graduated butterfly shelves against a barrel back with a fluted center post.

Over the past 40 years, the house's walls and support beams have become damaged and weakened by water. Tours of the Allee House have been discontinued due to unsafe conditions related to sagging floors and chimney damage.

=== Port Mahon Lighthouse ===
Port Mahon, located at the southern boundary of the Refuge, was named after the capital of the Spanish island of Menorca. Built about 1890, Port Mahon included a blacksmith shop and a general store and was once the center of port activity in the Little Creek area. The lighthouse was built in 1903 and the lighthouse keeper tended the kerosene lamps faithfully. General supplies were brought in yearly when carts were able to carry them over the marsh-lined dirt road from Little Creek. All of the light station, with the exception of the support pilings, was destroyed by fire in 1984.

=== Bombay Hook Lighthouse ===
The Bombay Hook Lighthouse was constructed by the U.S. Government in 1829. In 1830, former Governor of Delaware Jacob Stout, laid out the road between Bombay Hook Lighthouse and Smyrna. In 1831, President Andrew Jackson and his Secretary of Treasury, Louis McLane appointed Duncan Stewart as the first keeper of Bombay Hook Lighthouse. In 1854, Duncan's daughter, Margaret Stewart, was appointed to her father's position as keeper upon his death that year at age 92. Four other keepers and their families lived and worked at this station, the last being Edward W. Long who was appointed April 11, 1912. In September 1912, the newly erected Smyrna River Range Lights came into service. These were a set of iron towers located in the mouth of the river displaying automated (unmanned) lights. Upon activation of the range lights, the Bombay Hook Lighthouse was considered obsolete and was "discontinued" at that time. The lighthouse sat abandoned and deteriorating for decades. In 1974, the Delaware State Division of Fish & Wildlife decided to demolish the lighthouse due to the hazard it evolved into over the years from vandalism and a series of fires.

== Gallery ==
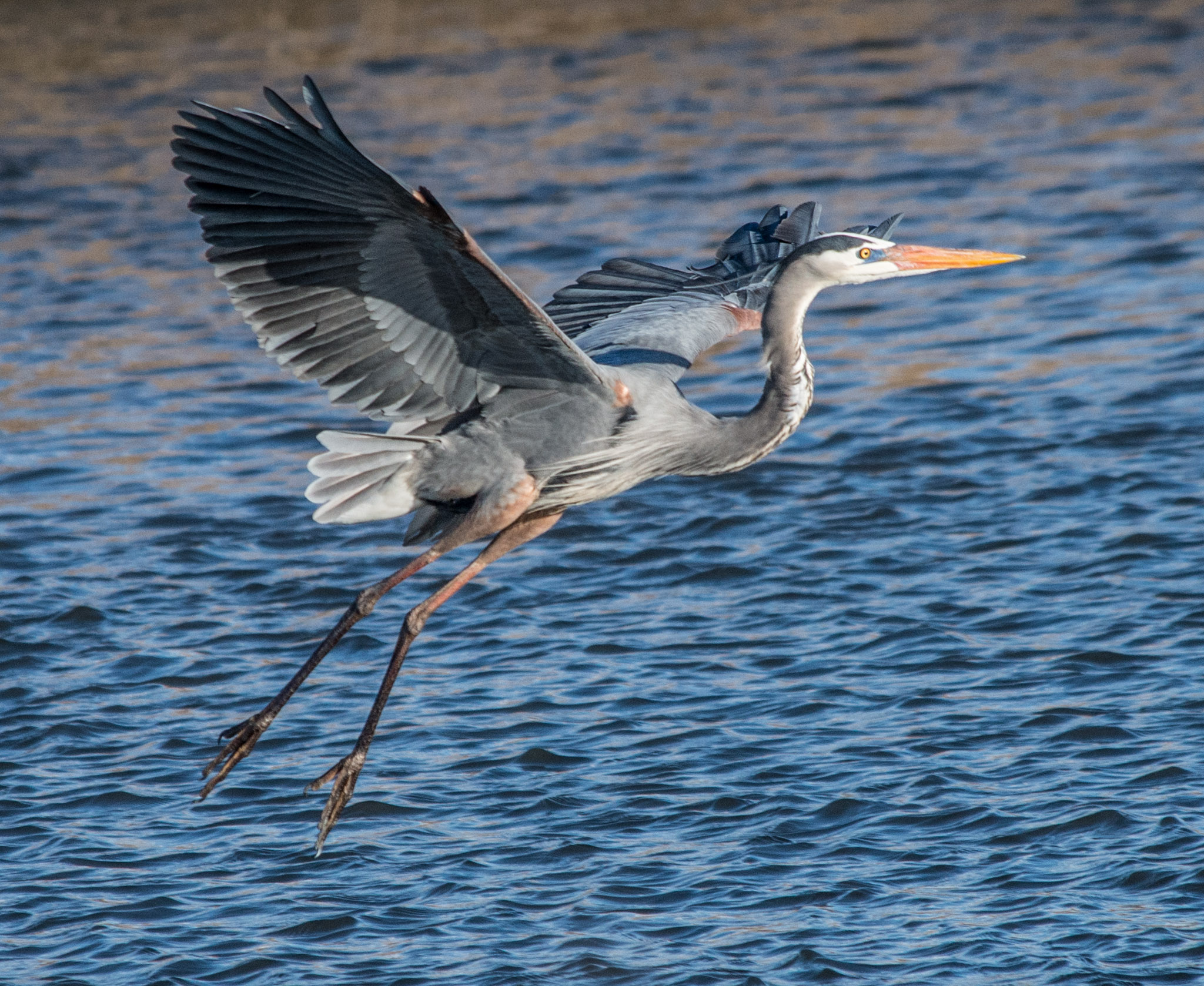
Great Blue Heron landing the Bombay Hook National Wildlife Refuge

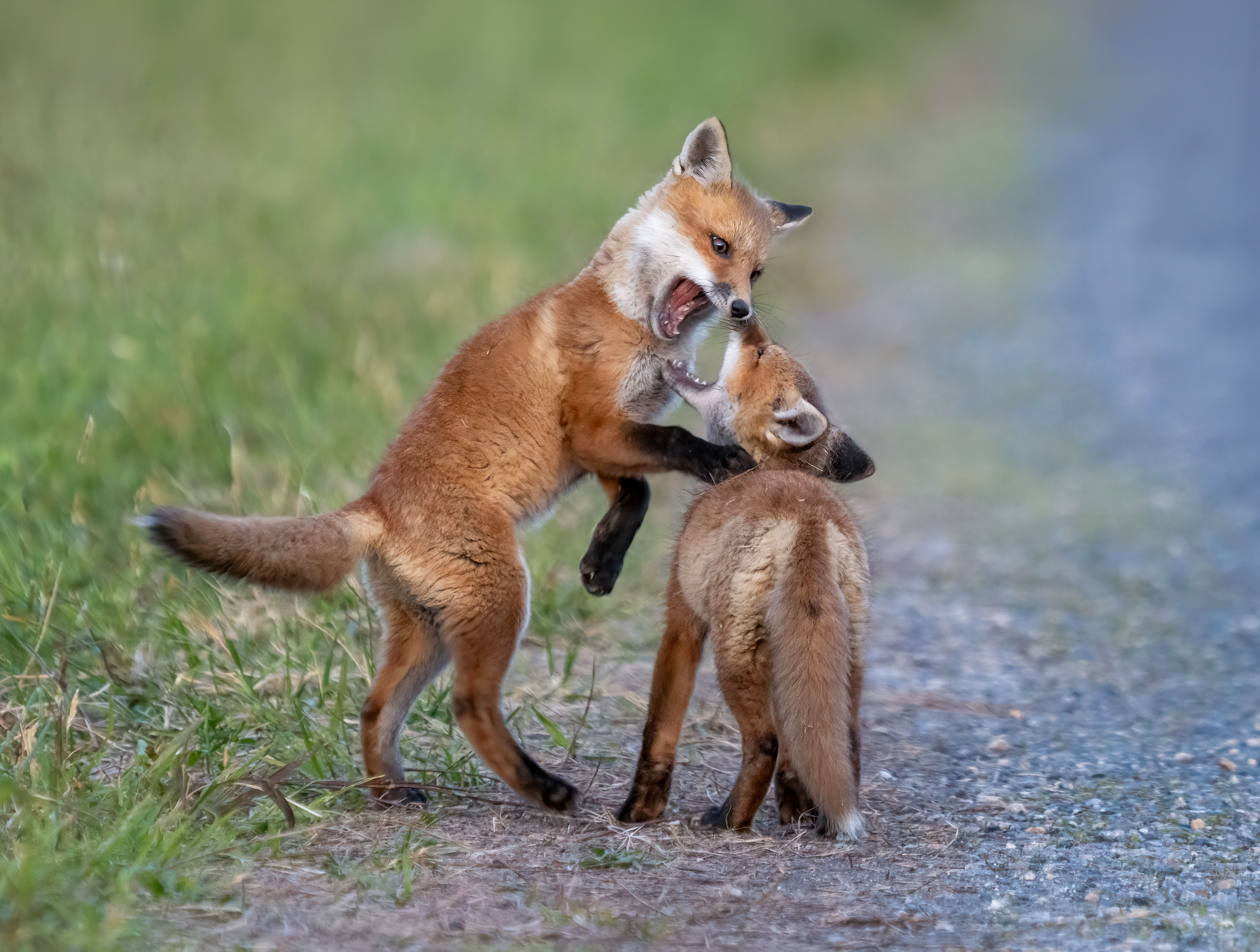
Red fox kits playing

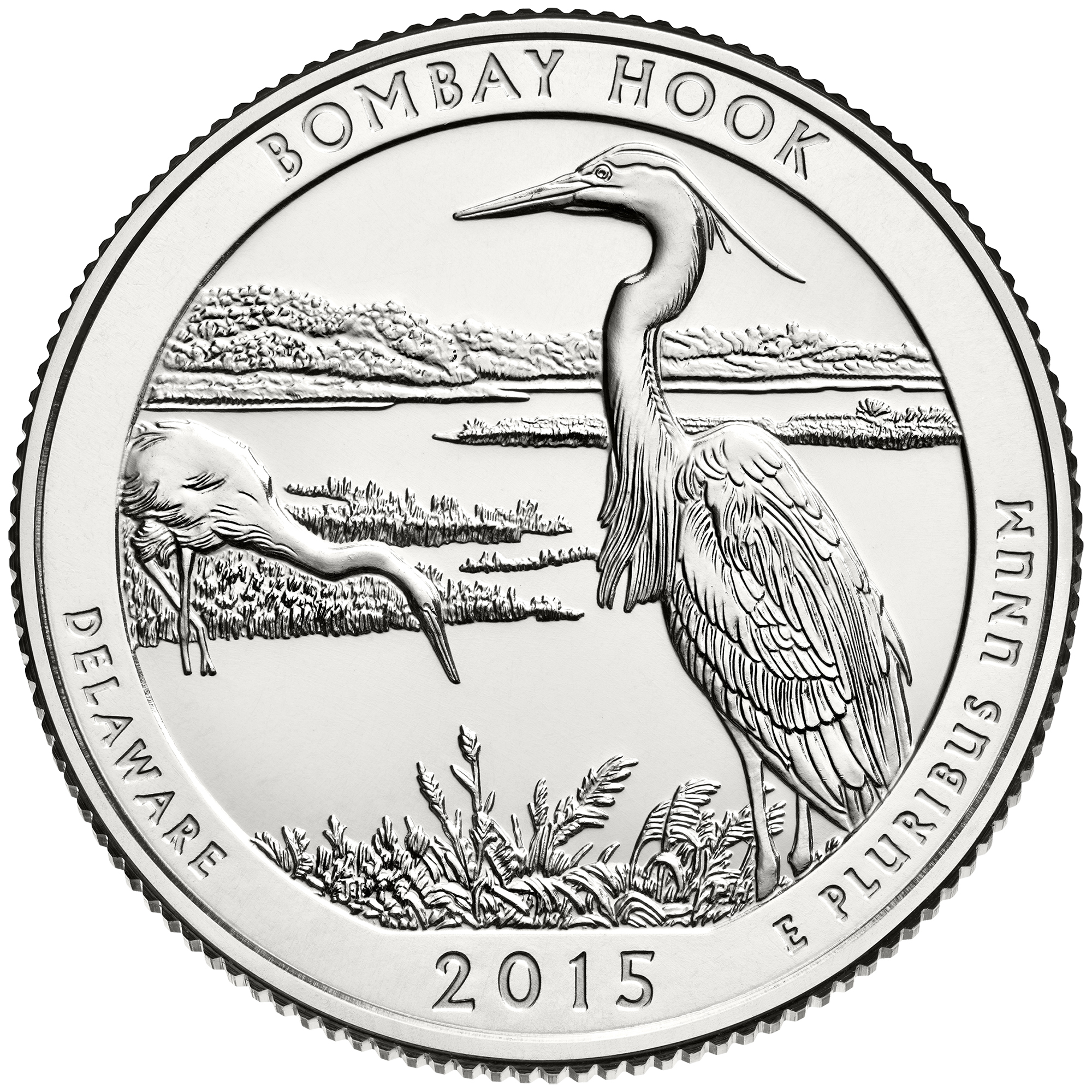
Bombay Hook is featured on Delaware's America the Beautiful quarter.

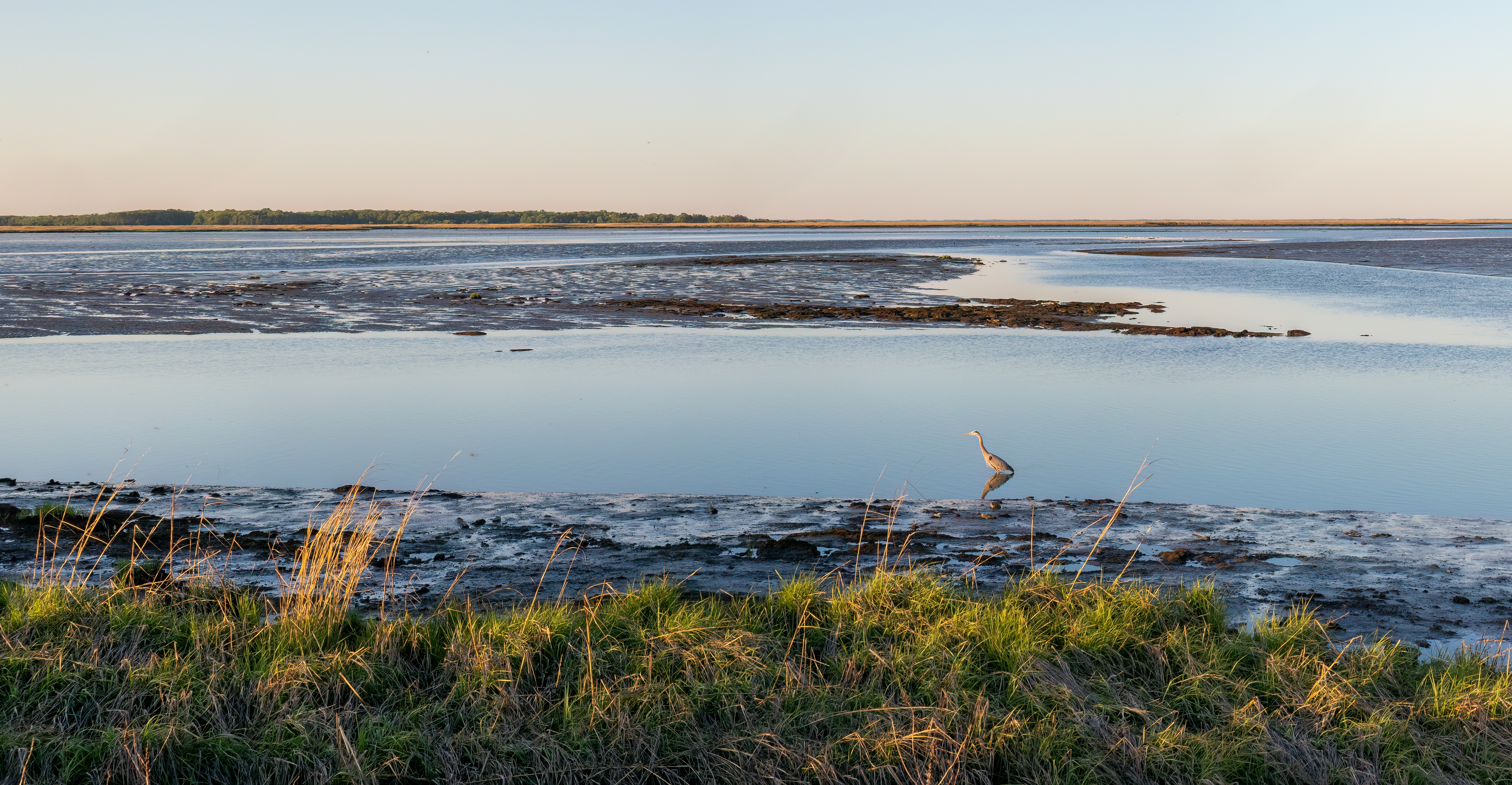
Bombay Hook at sunset, facing east

== See also ==
- List of National Wildlife Refuges of the United States

== Notes and citations ==
Notes

Citations
