= Coastal Heritage Greenway =

Greenway in Delaware, U.S.

The Coastal Heritage Greenway is a greenway in the U.S. state of Delaware linking many sites along the Delaware Bay and the Atlantic Ocean between Fox Point State Park in Edgemoor, New Castle County and the beach town of Fenwick Island in Sussex County. The greenway follows Delaware Route 9 from the Wilmington area to just south of Dover and Delaware Route 1 from Dover to Fenwick Island.

== Points of interest ==
=== Sussex County ===
- Fenwick Island
- Fenwick Island State Park
- Bethany Beach
- Delaware Seashore State Park
- Dewey Beach
- Rehoboth Beach
- Cape Henlopen State Park
- Lewes
- Beach Plum Island Nature Preserve
- Prime Hook National Wildlife Refuge
- Mispillion Light

=== Kent County ===
- Barratt's Chapel
- John Dickinson Plantation
- Little Creek Wildlife Area
- Port Mahon
- Leipsic
- Bombay Hook National Wildlife Refuge
- Allee House
- Woodland Beach
- Woodland Beach Wildlife Area

=== New Castle County ===
- Flemings Landing
- Collins Beach
- Taylor's Bridge
- Odessa
- Silver Run
- Augustine Beach
- Port Penn
- Thousand Acre Marsh
- Delaware City
- Dragon Run
- Red Lion Creek
- New Castle
- Fox Point State Park

== Side trips ==
The greenway features side trips to the following cities and towns:

- Milton
- Milford
- Dover
