= Sea Duck Joint Venture =

International conservation partnership

The Sea Duck Joint Venture (SDJV) is a conservation partnership established in 1998 whose mission is "promoting the conservation of North America’s Sea Ducks". The partners are the Canadian Wildlife Service, the United States Fish and Wildlife Service, the United States Geological Survey, Ducks Unlimited, Bird Studies Canada, the Pacific Flyway Council, and the council for U.S. Flyways. It is one of three species joint ventures operating within the North American Waterfowl Management Plan.

The partnership studies 15 species of sea ducks: Barrow's goldeneye, black scoter, bufflehead, common eider, common goldeneye, common merganser, harlequin duck, hooded merganser, king eider, long-tailed duck, red-breasted merganser, spectacled eider, Steller's eider, surf scoter, and white-winged scoter. These represent one third of all waterfowl species in North America. Four of these species are threatened in some of their habitats: the harlequin duck in eastern Canada, the Barrow's goldeneye in eastern Canada and Maine, and the spectacled eider and Steller's eider in the United States.

Four primary factors were identified for the declining populations of sea ducks in North America: "lack of knowledge about their ecology, contaminants, unsustainable hunting, and habitat loss and degradation". Activities such as "logging, fuel-wood harvesting, and land developments" have resulted in loss of breeding habitats for cavity-nesting sea ducks, particularly the mergansers, goldeneyes, and buffleheads. Habitat loss includes the effects of coastal development, resource exploration and development, use of waterways for shipping, and other large-scale environmental changes. Contamination results from oil spills and the discharge of heavy metals into the water system.

== Conferences ==
A conference is held every three years between partners and scientists involved in the study and preservation of sea duck populations. The first was held in Victoria, British Columbia, in 2002, and subsequent events were held in Annapolis, Maryland (2005), Quebec City (2008), Seward, Alaska (2011), and Reykjavík, Iceland (2014).
