= Allee House (Dutch Neck Crossroads, Delaware) =

Historic house in Delaware, United States

- U.S. National Register of Historic Places
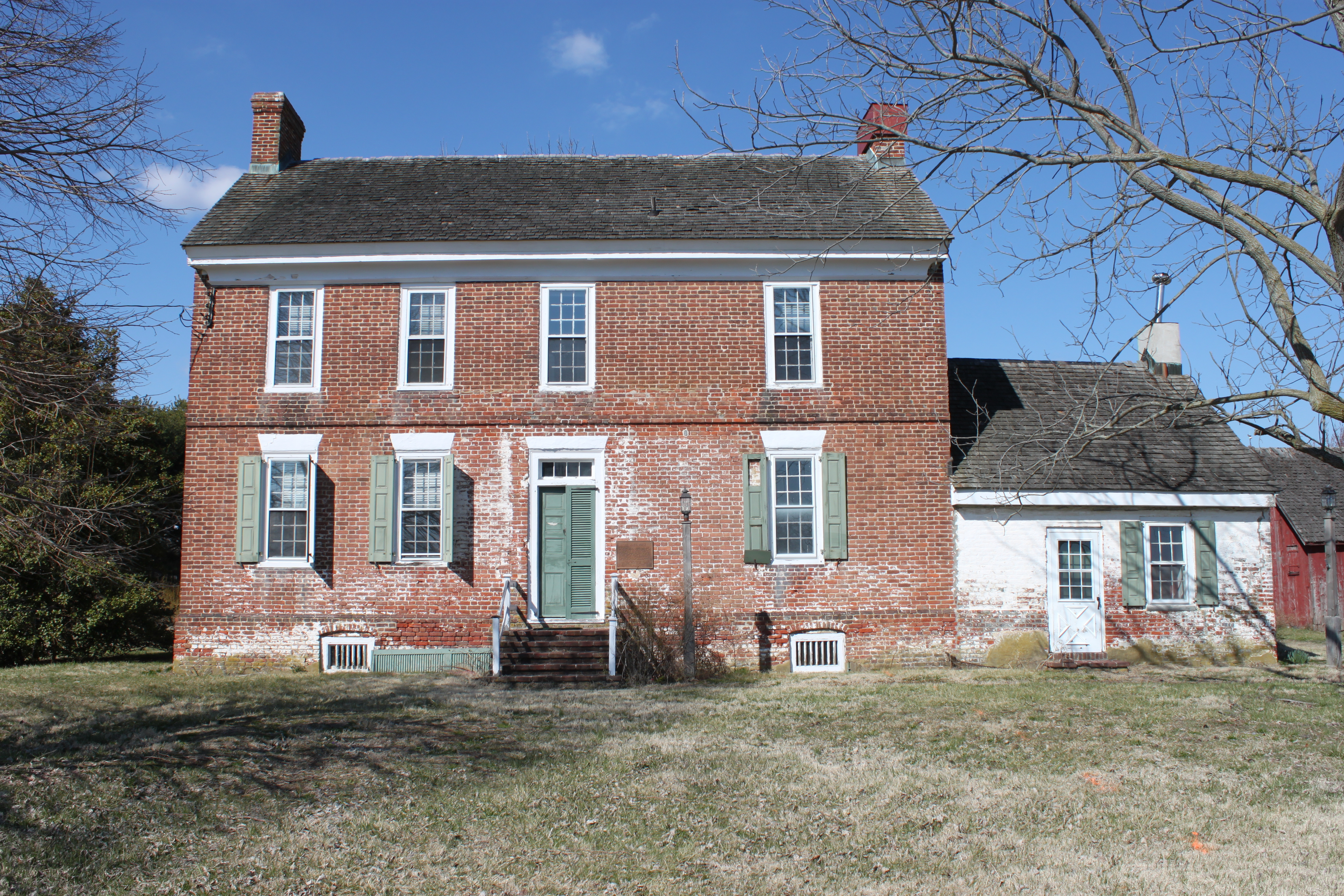
- Allee House, March 2011

- Location within Delaware Location within the United States
- Location: Off Delaware Route 9 on Dutch Neck Rd., Dutch Neck Crossroads, Delaware
- Coordinates: 39.2847°N 75.5045°W
- Area: 0.7 acres (0.28 ha)
- Built: 1753
- Built by: Allee, Abraham Sr.
- Architectural style: Queen Anne
- NRHP reference No.: 71000220
- Added to NRHP: March 24, 1971

The Allee House is a historic home located on the Bombay Hook National Wildlife Refuge, near Dutch Neck Crossroads, overlooking the fields and marshes of Kent County, Delaware. It is believed to have been built in about 1753 by Abraham Allee, Sr., son of John Allee, who purchased the land in 1706 and 1711. The Allees were descended from French Huguenots who moved to New Jersey in 1680, then settled in Delaware. The original spelling of the Allee surname is d'Ailly. Abraham Allee served as a member of the Assembly in 1726, was appointed a Justice of the Peace in 1738, and was Chief Ranger for the county in 1749.

The Allee House is one of the best preserved examples of an early brick farmhouse in Delaware. It is in the English Queen Anne style and features fine brickwork laid in Flemish bond with a few glazed header bricks. The interior of the house is distinguished by the handsome wood paneling of the parlor. The cornice in this room has a dentil course that is particularly well formed, and the splendid panels of the chimney breast are joined on either side by two striking recessed, arched china closets. These closets have paneled doors and graduated butterfly shelves against a barrel back with a fluted center post.

Over the past 40 years, the house's walls and support beams have become damaged and weakened by water. Tours of the Allee House have been discontinued due to unsafe conditions related to sagging floors and chimney damage. It was listed on the National Register of Historic Places in 1971, and is administered as part of Bombay Hook National Wildlife Refuge.
