= Eastern Habitat Joint Venture =

The Eastern Habitat Joint Venture is a partnership established on 15 November 1989 between governments, organizations, and conservation groups in eastern Canada to protect and enhance wetlands important to migratory birds, under the auspices of the North American Waterfowl Management Plan.

The founding partners were the six easternmost provinces (Ontario, Quebec, Newfoundland and Labrador, Nova Scotia, New Brunswick and Prince Edward Island), the Canadian Wildlife Service (a branch of Environment and Climate Change Canada), Ducks Unlimited Canada, and Wildlife Habitat Canada. As a signatory, each province was expected to develop and implement its own program.

== Objectives ==
The initial goals of the plan at founding were to conserve approximately 18,000 km² of wetlands in the eastern provinces by 2004. These wetlands are important to waterfowl and other migratory birds that use the Atlantic Flyway.

== Programs ==
=== Ontario ===
In Ontario, the program is administered by the Canadian Wildlife Service, the Ministry of Natural Resources, the Ministry of Agriculture, Food and Rural Affairs, Ducks Unlimited Canada, the Nature Conservancy of Canada and Wildlife Habitat Canada.

=== Prince Edward Island ===
Small-scale programs include the Small Marsh Program initiated by the government of Prince Edward Island, in which landowners of marshes with an area up to 10 acres (40,000 m^{2}) may apply for restoration of those wetlands. Approximately twenty sites are restored annually, prioritized "according to their biological value". The cost is borne by the program and its sponsors, and the landowners must sign an "agreement to maintain the restored wetland for a 25-year period".

Prince Edward Island also operates a Wetland Stewardship Program within the scope of the Eastern Habitat Joint Venture. From 1991 to 2003, it protected 60 km² of upland and wetland habitat in the province, in which soil erosion is the most significant environmental issue.

=== Quebec ===
The Quebec component of the program involves a partnership between Ducks Unlimited Canada, Nature Conservancy of Canada, the Fondation de la faune du Québec, the Ministère du Développement durable, de l’Environnement et des Parcs, the Ministère des Ressources naturelles et de la Faune, and the Canadian Wildlife Service of Environment Canada.

In Quebec, nearly half of all program funding from this project is devoted to the biosphere reserve of Lac Saint-Pierre and its environs, encompassing 35 km² of nationally significant wetlands. The activities of the Quebec partnership focus primarily on "the protection of habitats and the restoration of wetlands along the St. Lawrence and Ottawa rivers".

=== Newfoundland and Labrador ===
The program is administered by the provincial Department of Fisheries and Land Resources' Wildlife Division through a partnership with the Stewardship Association of Municipalities, along with partners Ducks Unlimited Canada, Nature Conservancy Canada, Indian Bay Ecosystems Corporation, Intervale Associates, Environment and Climate Change Canada, and Wildlife Habitat Canada.
