= Dutch Neck Crossroads, Delaware =

Unincorporated community in Delaware, United States

- Unincorporated community
- Location within Delaware Location within the United States
- Coordinates: 39°17′10″N 75°30′57″W
- Country: United States
- State: Delaware
- County: Kent
- Elevation: 16 ft (4.9 m)
- Time zone: UTC-5 (Eastern (EST))
  - Summer (DST): UTC-4 (EDT)
- Area code: 302
- GNIS feature ID: 216084

Dutch Neck Crossroads is an unincorporated community in Kent County, Delaware, United States. Dutch Neck Crossroads is located on Delaware Route 9, 4.9 miles (7.9 km) east of Smyrna. The Allee House, which is listed on the National Register of Historic Places, is located in Dutch Neck Crossroads.
