= Prairie Habitat Joint Venture =

Canadian conservation partnership

The Prairie Habitat Joint Venture is a partnership between governments, organizations, and conservation groups in the provinces of Manitoba, Saskatchewan, and Alberta in Canada. It is one of four Canadian habitat joint ventures operating as part of the North American Waterfowl Management Plan, and is contiguous with the Prairie Pothole Joint Venture in the United States.

== Structure ==
The joint venture is administered via an advisory board consisting of members from the following government agencies and independent organizations:

- Agriculture and Agri-Food Canada
- Alberta Sustainable Resource Development
- Alberta NAWMP Partnership
- Canadian Wildlife Service (part of Environment Canada)
- Ducks Unlimited Canada
- Manitoba Conservation
- Manitoba Heritage Habitat Corporation
- Nature Conservancy of Canada
- Saskatchewan Environment
- Saskatchewan Watershed Authority
- Wildlife Habitat Canada

=== Funding ===
By 2005, the Prairie Habitat Joint Venture had received $641 million in funding from several sources.

- Federal government of the United States, $198.7 million
- United States non-government, $182 million
- Federal Government of Canada, $94.4 million
- Provincial governments in Canada, $77.3 million
- Canadian not-for-profit organizations, $42.9 million
- State governments in the United States, $37.4 million
- Canadian private, corporate and other, $8.7 million
- Others, $94,000

== Purpose ==
The program's focus areas are the prairie and aspen parkland of Manitoba, Saskatchewan, and Alberta. The Peace River parkland region in northeastern British Columbia is also a primary conservation target.

Additional programs administered by this venture include the conservation of the western boreal forest ecology in the Taiga Plains, Taiga Cordillera, Boreal Cordillera, Taiga Shield and Boreal Plains.

== Activities ==
The venture has secured land through various programs. By 2005, a total of 3,642,042 acres (14,738.8 km^{2}) had been secured, of which 475,856 acres (1,925.7 km^{2}) were permanently secured via acquisition, land donation, conservation easement, or Crown land transfer; 800,808 acres (3,240.8 km^{2}) were in stewardship; and 2,365,378 acres (9,572.3 km^{2}) are in the scope of various agreements, including leases, conservation agreements, and land use agreements. Approximately 55% of the required funding projected in 1989 has been received and allocated to various programs in order to secure 9,800,000 acres (40,000 km^{2}) of land identified by provincial implementation plans to be within the scope of this venture.

Three partnership programs with Agriculture and Agri-Food Canada have led to the conversion of agricultural and environmentally sensitive land to perennial cover, consistent with the goals of the North American Waterfowl Management Plan.

A marsh monitoring program is under development, and will be implemented once adequate long-term capital and operational funding has been secured.
