= Chimney breast =

Portion of a wall which projects forward over a fireplace

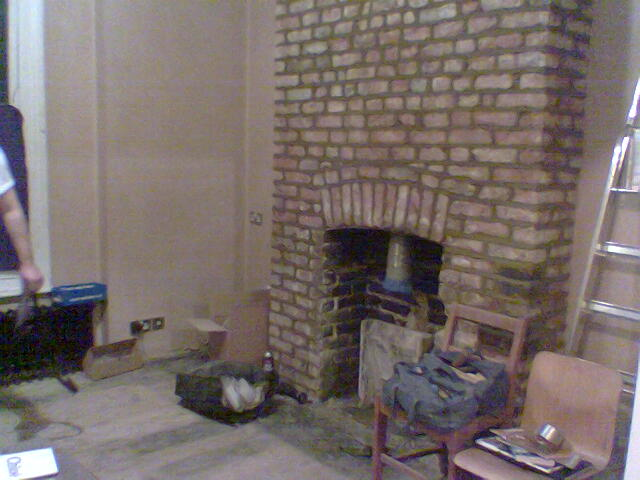
A brick chimney breast

A chimney breast is a portion of a chimney which projects forward from a wall to accommodate a fireplace. Typically on the ground floor of a structure, the masonry extends upwards, containing a flue which carries smoke out of the building through a chimney stack. Chimney jambs similarly project from the wall, but they do so on either side of the fireplace and serve to support the chimney breast. The interior of a chimney breast is commonly filled with brickwork or concrete.

The construction and appearance of a chimney breast can vary according to function and style. English and American builders more often treat the chimney breast and fireplace as distinct architectural features, whereas French buildings have gradually trended towards concealed construction.

== False chimney breasts ==
False chimney breasts are sometimes constructed around a twin-walled flue or against a wall pierced by a flue for purely cosmetic purposes. Typically they will consist of a timber frame or stud work covered with plaster board and a plaster skim. If the false breast contains a flue, it may be necessary to line it with a refractory material such as vermiculite. Usually, additional cosmetic features will be added, such as cosmetic beams, overmantels or fireplace surrounds.

== Removal ==
Chimney breasts often become redundant with respect to their function as a chimney after the installation of alternative heating methods, such as central heating. Removing a chimney breast can create more floor space and a more regular-shaped room, but since chimney breasts often have a structural function, removal requires careful planning. It’s essential to consult a structural engineer and follow building regulations. Use appropriate PPE, especially dust masks (FFP3) to avoid inhaling fine particles, such as silica and asbestos, which can be smaller than 2.5 microns. These particles can be harmful if inhaled, so professional advice and asbestos testing are recommended. The removal of part (especially the lower part) of a breast can cause uneven loading on a wall, especially if the upper part is not suitably supported, ideally on an I-beam. In some cases, support on a steel beam and post, or by gallows brackets may be acceptable with party wall agreement. A gallows bracket cannot be used on both sides of the party wall without removing the chimney stack.

Other factors that need to be considered when removing a chimney breast are: fire safety particular for party walls, noise insulation, effect on neighbour's chimney, damp prevention, and ventilation.
