= Central Flyway =

Bird migration route

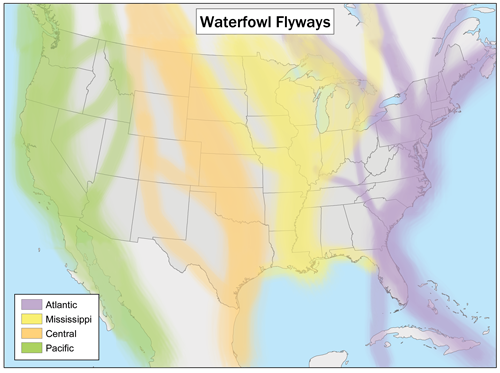
Waterfowl flyways in the United States. The Central Flyway is in orange

The Central Flyway is a bird migration route that generally follows the Great Plains in the United States and Canada. The main endpoints of the flyway include the Canadian Prairies and the region surrounding the Gulf of Mexico; the migration route tends to narrow considerably in the Platte River and Missouri River valleys of central and eastern Nebraska, which accounts for the high number of bird species found there. Some birds even use this flyway to migrate from the Arctic Ocean to Patagonia. The Central Flyway follows a route with relatively few major geographic barriers. Good sources of water, food, and cover exist over its entire length.

The other primary migration routes for North American birds includes the Atlantic, Mississippi and Pacific Flyways. The Central Flyway merges with the Mississippi Flyway between Missouri and the Gulf of Mexico.

== Locations ==
The Central Flyway goes through the American states of Montana, Wyoming, Colorado, New Mexico, Texas, Oklahoma, Kansas, Nebraska, South Dakota, and North Dakota; the Canadian provinces of Alberta, Saskatchewan, Manitoba, and the Northwest Territories; and the majority of Mexico. In northern Manitoba, the flyway intersects with the Atlantic and Mississippi Flyways.

Over 100 National Wildlife Refuges lie within the American part of the flyway, including the Quivira National Wildlife Refuge. Notable Canadian sites in the flyway include Galloway Bay and Miry Bay (the west end of Lake Diefenbaker), Saskatchewan, and Beaverhill Lake, Alberta.

== Management ==
The Central Flyway Council is composed of representatives from agencies responsible for migratory bird management in 10 states, two Canadian provinces and the Northwest Territories.

Most of the National Wildlife Refuges in the flyway conduct bird surveys during migration. Some refuges have carried on these surveys since the 1940s, with most beginning to survey in the 1990s or later.
