= Pacific Birds Habitat Joint Venture =

The Pacific Birds Habitat Joint Venture (PBHJV), previously Pacific Coast Joint Venture is a partnership established in 1991 between governments, organizations, and conservation groups along the Pacific Coast of the United States and Canada, established to protect and enhance wetlands important to migratory birds, within the framework of the North American Waterfowl Management Plan (NAWMP). Participants include the provincial government of British Columbia in Canada, and the state governments of Alaska, California, Hawaii, Oregon and Washington in the United States. The venture's scope covers an area from San Francisco Bay to Alaska, west of the Coast Mountains, and it was the first joint venture of the NAWMP to have an international scope.

Between 2001 and 2004, Ducks Unlimited Canada and the Canadian Wildlife Service ran a project supported by PBHJV partners to identify and map estuaries in British Columbia that would be targets for conservation. These are located in an expanse covered by the PBHJV of 220,000 km^{2} of landscape, 460,000 km^{2} of seascape, and over 30,000 km of shoreline.

In California, the joint venture focuses on coastal northern California, specifically in Del Norte, Humboldt, Mendocino, Trinity, and Siskiyou Counties. The project in Washington focuses on bird habitats in its western and coastal regions, specifically the bays and straits of northern Washington, the southern Puget Sound and Hood Canal, the Olympic Peninsula, the southern Washington coast, and the Lower Columbia River.

In British Columbia, the partnership is focused on the east coast of Vancouver Island and the Fraser River delta. with a goal to "protect, restore, and enhance the natural integrity of coastal wetlands". It also launched Operation Orange, a scientific survey to track spartina, which is "choking the Pacific shoreline and endangering native species". The project also extends to Washington, where the Washington State Department of Agriculture, The Nature Conservancy, and the Puget Sound Joint Venture team track spartina in Puget Sound and the Georgia Strait. Program execution is conducted by Ducks Unlimited Canada in British Columbia.
