= Mississippi Flyway =

Bird migration route across central North America

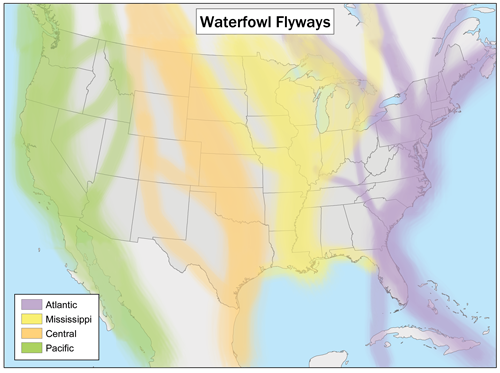
Waterfowl flyways in the United States. The Mississippi Flyway is in yellow

The Mississippi Flyway is a bird migration route that generally follows the Mississippi, Missouri, and Lower Ohio Rivers in the United States across the western Great Lakes to the Mackenzie River and Hudson Bay in Canada. The main endpoints of the flyway include central Canada and the region surrounding the Gulf of Mexico. The migration route tends to narrow considerably in the lower Mississippi River valley in the states of Missouri, Arkansas, Mississippi, and Louisiana, which accounts for the high number of bird species found in those areas. Some birds use this flyway to migrate from the Arctic Ocean to Patagonia.

Typically birds use this route because no mountains or ridges of hills block the path over its entire extent. Good sources of water, food, and cover exist over its entire length. About 40% of all North American migrating waterfowl and shorebirds use this route.

The other primary migration routes for North American birds include the Atlantic, Central and Pacific Flyways. The Central Flyway merges with the Mississippi Flyway between Missouri and the Gulf of Mexico. In the northern portions of the Upper Mississippi River, the birds congregate in the Driftless Area.

Major wildlife refuges along the flyway include Trempealeau National Wildlife Refuge and Upper Mississippi River National Wildlife and Fish Refuge.
