= Atlantic Flyway =

Major north-south flyway for migratory birds in North America

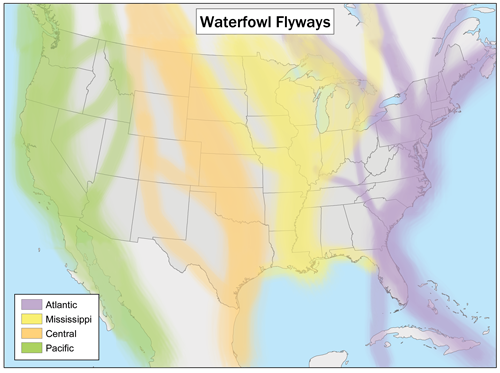
Waterfowl flyways in the United States. The Atlantic Flyway is in violet.

The Atlantic Flyway is a major north-south flyway for migratory birds in North America. The route generally starts in Greenland, then follows the Atlantic coast of Canada, then south down the Atlantic Coast of the United States to the tropical areas of South America and the Caribbean. Every year, migratory birds travel up and down this route following food sources, heading to breeding grounds, or traveling to overwintering sites.

This route is used by birds typically because no mountains block most of this path, though birds cross the Appalachian Mountains to join the flyway. Good sources of water, food, and cover exist over its entire length. The warm climates found in the southern portion of the region are home to many northern birds in winter, while in summer the region is home to many bird species from South America.

Land located within the Atlantic Flyway is the most densely populated land out of the four major flyways crossing the United States.

== The journey ==
Ducks and geese are born in the tundra of Quebec, and fly south in autumn to Chesapeake Bay and Virginia's Back Bay, and the James River, and then move southward through North and South Carolina, Georgia and Florida for the winter. Northeast and northwest Florida attract teal and divers as the winter progresses. In the northeastern states the Saint Lawrence River, the coast of Maine, Long island harbors, Barnegat Bay, Great Egg Harbor, Little Egg Harbor, Absecon Bay, Delaware Bay, Chesapeake Bay, Virginia's Eastern Shore and Back Bays saw presidents and captains of great industry spend part of their winters at their wildfowling clubs. In South Carolina there was Georgetown's and Charleston's old rice fields, and backcountry marshes and freshwater rivers and lakes that continued to draw ducks in great numbers until the Santee National Wildlife Refuge stopped feeding the ducks in the winter months of the 1980s due to the economy and changes in National Wildlife Refuge policy across the nation. In the 1960s to the mid-1980s the upper Santee swamp's upper Lake Marion region used to winter over 150,000 mallards each and every winter's duck count.

== Notable locations ==
Along the Atlantic Flyway, there are many key sites that migratory birds use to gather to breed, feed, or rest for certain periods. Some species may remain in these rest stops for the entire season. Notable locations include:

=== Canada ===
- Great Plain of the Koukdjuak, Nunavut
- Shepody Bay West, New Brunswick

=== United States ===
- Acadia National Park, Maine. The park preserves about half of Mount Desert Island, many adjacent smaller islands, and part of the Schoodic Peninsula on the coast of Maine. A total of 215 bird species, including migratory birds, are present at some time during the year. An additional 116 species are possibly present but unconfirmed, making a total of 331 potential species.
- Assateague Island National Seashore, Maryland and Virginia. Protected area on a long barrier island off the coast of Maryland and Virginia. It is known for its Atlantic beaches and for trails that wind through marshland, dunes and pine forest. In the south, Chincoteague National Wildlife Refuge is home to wild Chincoteague ponies, bald eagles and thousands of migratory seabirds.
- Back Bay National Wildlife Refuge, Virginia's Outer Banks. As part of Virginia's Outer Banks, the refuge's barrier islands feature large sand dunes, maritime forests, freshwater marshes, ponds, ocean beaches, and large impoundments for wintering wildfowl.
- Blackwater National Wildlife Refuge, Maryland's Eastern Shore. The refuge includes over 30,000 acres (120 km^{2}) of tidal marsh, managed freshwater wetlands, mixed hardwood and loblolly pine forests, and croplands. It hosts over 250 bird species and serves as an important resting and feeding site for migrating and wintering waterfowl, including more than 35,000 Canada geese and 15,000 ducks using the Atlantic Flyway during the fall migration. The refuge is home to one of the highest concentrations of nesting bald eagles on the Atlantic coast.
- Cape Cod National Seashore, Massachusetts. Migratory birds can be found along the 40 miles of public beach and sand dunes.
- Cape Hatteras National Seashore, North Carolina. Cape Hatteras is a windswept barrier islands along the North Carolina coast, much of it protected from development.
- Cape Romain National Wildlife Refuge, South Carolina. Cape Romain features over 293 species of birds recorded on the refuge. During spring and fall, migratory shorebirds, songbirds and raptors move through the refuge.
- Delaware Bay, Delaware. This massive bay has been recognized as a globally important bird area. The area includes Bombay Hook National Wildlife Refuge along the Delaware Bay, recognized as one of America's Top 100 “Important Birding Areas” by the American Bird Conservancy. Just to the north in the middle of the Delaware River, Pea Patch Island is home to one of the largest and most diverse heronries on the East Coast, boasting nesting pairs of great blue herons, great egrets, snowy egrets, and many more colorful varieties.
- Jekyll Island, Georgia. Habitat types include salt marsh, sand dune/beach, maritime forest, and tidal creeks, which host many different species of bird.
- Mackay Island National Wildlife Refuge, North Carolina and Virginia. The refuge is strategically located along the Atlantic Flyway, making it an important wintering area for ducks, geese, and tundra swans. At times, flocks of over 12,000 snow geese may be observed on the refuge after their arrival in November.
- Merritt Island National Wildlife Refuge, Florida. In winter, waterfowl and American Coots are abundant here; this is also a good site for northern pintails, Eurasian wigeons, and cinnamon teal. The Blackpoint Wildlife Drive features wading birds, waterfowl, shorebirds, gulls, terns, raptors, American white pelicans, and brown pelicans, among others.
- Montezuma National Wildlife Refuge, New York. The 10,004-acre (40.48 km^{2}) preserve is composed of swamps, pools and channels and is a stopping point for many migratory marsh and water birds including the great blue heron, green heron, great egret, black-crowned night heron, Virginia rail, sora, bitterns, common moorhen and pied-billed grebes.
- Dry Tortugas National Park, Florida. Dry Tortugas islands are the westernmost and most isolated of the Florida Keys. The archipelago's coral reefs are the least disturbed of the Florida Keys reefs. The park is noted for abundant sea life, tropical bird breeding grounds, colorful coral reefs, and shipwrecks and sunken treasures. The Dry Tortugas provide the only regular nesting site for sooty terns, masked boobies, brown noddies, and magnificent frigatebirds in the continental U.S. For birders, spring migration is the main attraction in the Tortugas, offering an alluring mix of breeding rarities and exhausted migrants after traveling nonstop over the Gulf of Mexico. During peak migration, this can lead to the observation of a numerous variety of birds, including prized species like hooded warblers, yellow-throated vireos, and summer tanagers.
- J.N. "Ding" Darling National Wildlife Refuge, Florida. The refuse supports populations of shorebirds, waterfowl, wading birds, passerines and raptors. Alligators can be seen on cold mornings basking in the sun. Neo-tropical migratory birds are present and start migrating through March. Marsh drawdown coincides with shorebird migration. Osprey nesting peaks in March.

== Other flyways ==
The other primary migration routes for North American birds include the Mississippi, Central and Pacific Flyways.

There is an East Atlantic Flyway in Europe, and one in the Atlantic Ocean.
