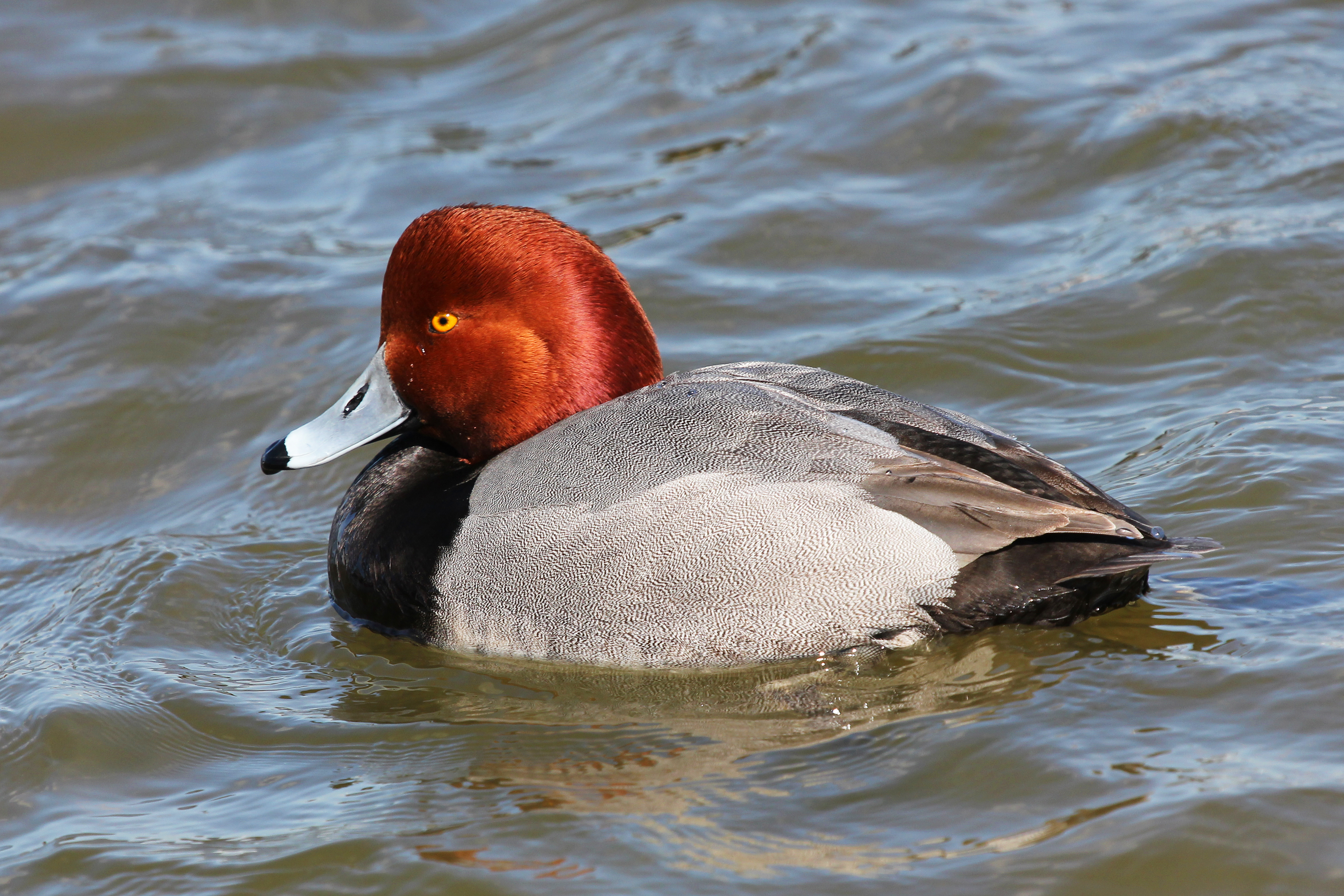
- Adult male, Maryland
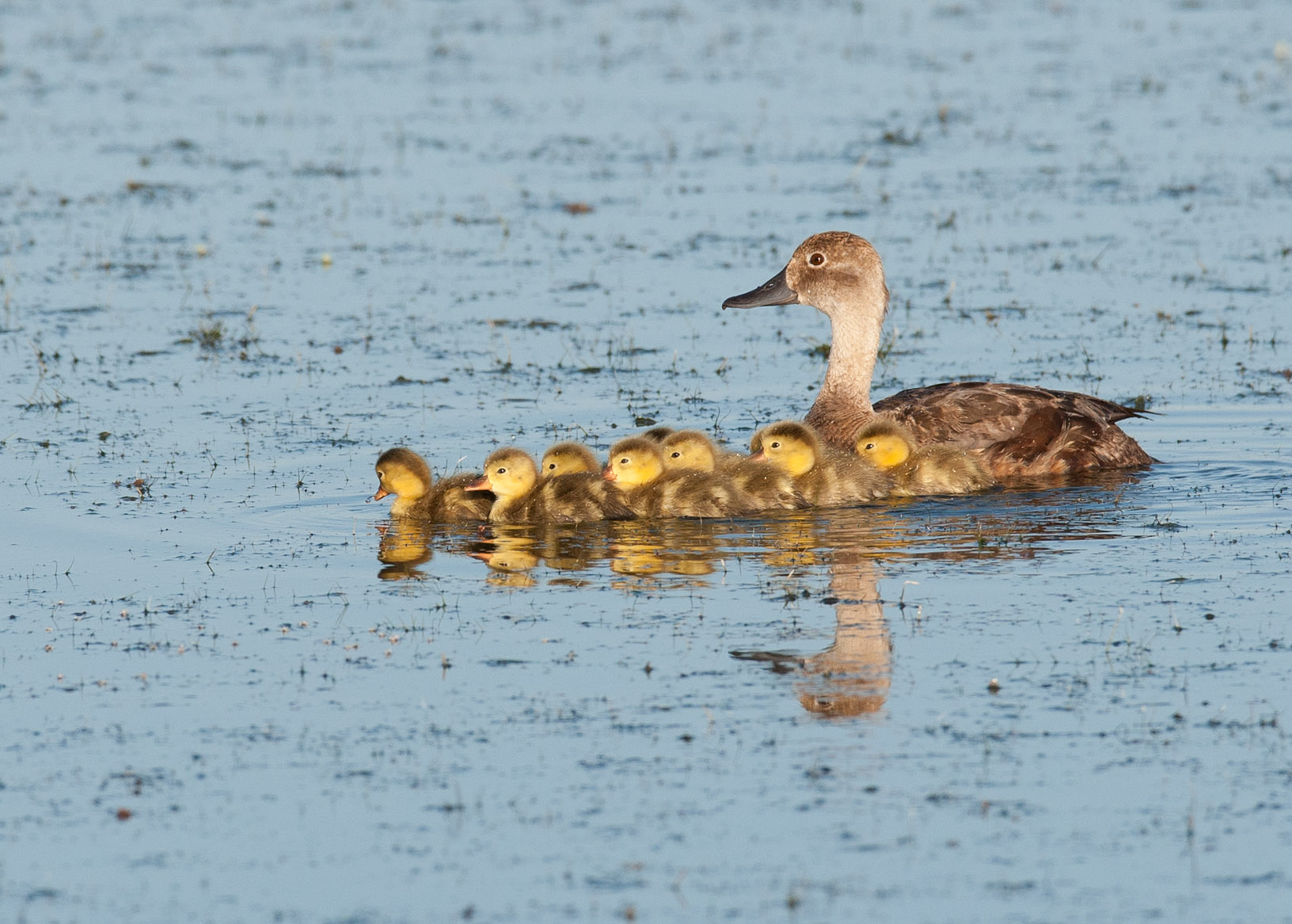
- Adult female with young, Montana

Conservation status
- Least Concern (IUCN 3.1)

Scientific classification
- Kingdom: Animalia
- Phylum: Chordata
- Class: Aves
- Order: Anseriformes
- Family: Anatidae
- Genus: Aythya
- Species: A. americana

Binomial name
- Aythya americana (Eyton, 1838)
- Breeding Year-round Migration Nonbreeding

= Redhead (bird) =

Species of North American diving duck

The redhead (Aythya americana) is a medium-sized diving duck. Its scientific name is derived from Greek aithuia, an unidentified seabird mentioned by authors including Hesychius and Aristotle, and Latin americana, of America. The redhead is 40–56 cm (16–22 in) long with an 74–84 cm (29–33 in) wingspan; weights range from 1,030–1,080 g (36–38 oz), with males weighing an average of 1,080 g (38 oz) and females an average of 1,030 g (36 oz). It belongs to the genus Aythya, together with 11 other described species. The redhead and the common pochard form a sister group, which together are sister to the canvasback. This waterfowl is easily distinguished from most other ducks by the male's copper-colored head and pale blue bill during the breeding season; from its close relative, canvasback, it is distinguished by the more rounded head, shorter bill, and (in the males) yellow, not red, eyes. The Eurasian common pochard is even more similar, but very rarely overlaps in range; it also differs in having a red eye, and a more acute, less rounded head shape.

Other names that have been used for the redhead include red-headed duck and the red-headed pochard.

== Taxonomy and phylogeny ==
=== Taxonomy ===
The redhead is in the family Anatidae (ducks, swans, geese) and genus Aythya (diving ducks). Currently, no subspecies of the redhead are accepted.

The two syntype specimens of Fuligula americana Eyton are held in the vertebrate zoology collections of National Museums Liverpool at World Museum, with accession numbers NML-VZ D829 (male immature) and NML-VZ D829a (female adult). The specimens were collected in North America and came to the Liverpool national collection via Thomas Campbell Eyton's collection and the 13th Earl of Derby's collection which was bequeathed to the city of Liverpool.

=== Phylogeny ===
The redhead and the common pochard form a sister group, which itself is sister to the canvasback. This group is then sister to the monophyletic group consisting of the white-eyes (hardhead, Madagascar pochard, and the sister species ferruginous duck and baer's pochard) and scaups (New Zealand scaup, ring-necked duck, tufted duck, greater scaup, lesser scaup).

== Description ==
The redhead is a pochard, a diving duck specially adapted to foraging underwater. Its legs are placed further back on the body, which makes walking on land difficult. The webbing on its feet is larger than dabbling ducks and its bills are broader to facilitate underwater foraging. In addition, pochards have a lobed hind toe. No pochard has a metallic-colored speculum, a characteristic of other ducks.

=== Male ===
During breeding season, the adult male has a copper head and neck, with a black breast. The back and sides are gray, the belly is white, and the rump and tail are black. A male's bill is pale blue with a black tip, with a thin ring separating the two colors. A nonbreeding male loses the copper color and instead has a brown head. The eyes are yellow, one of the most obvious differences from the canvasback and common pochard, which have red eyes.

=== Female ===
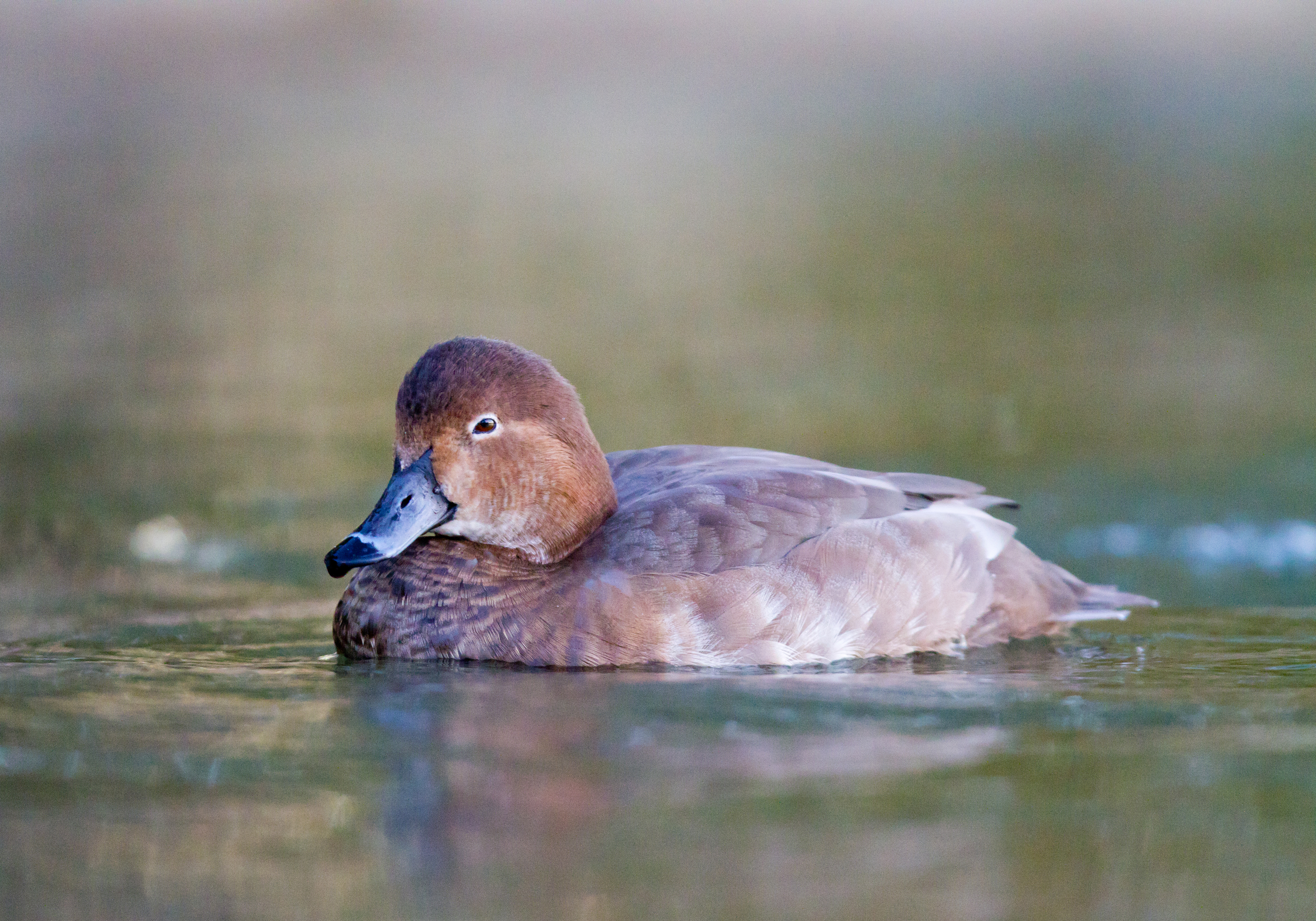
Female

The adult female, however, has a yellow to brown head and neck. The breast is brown, the belly is white, and the rest of the body is a gray to brown. The female bill is slate with a dark tip that is separated by a blue ring. Females remain the same color year round. The eyes are brown, as in all other Aythya species.

== Distribution ==
During breeding season, redheads are found across a wide range of North America, from as far north as Northern Canada, south to the Caribbean in winter. Their preferred areas include the intermontane regions of British Columbia, Alberta, Saskatchewan, Manitoba, with some small localities in Ontario and Quebec, and North and South Dakota inn the United States. These pochards then migrate south to winter in warmer climates. These areas include the southern United States, where breeding does not occur and extends to Mexico, Guatemala, Cuba, and the Bahamas. In both seasons, redheads use wetlands as their main habitat.

== Habitat ==
Small, semipermanent wetlands in nonforested country where the water is deep enough to provide dense emergent vegetation is considered ideal breeding habitat for redheads. When wintering, redheads switch to large areas of water near the coast that are protected from wave action, but can also be found in reservoirs, lakes, playa wetlands, freshwater river deltas, coastal marshes, estuaries, and bays.

== Predators ==
Redheads do not have many predators and are most likely to die of disease or indirect human impact. These ducks are considered less desirable as table fare than other puddle ducks like the mallard. However, their beautiful plumage makes them a targeted species for waterfowl hunters looking to focus on diving ducks. Adults can be preyed upon by northern river otters, red-tailed hawks, great horned owls, bald eagles, golden eagles, and to a greater extent, minks. Most predation comes in the form of duckling predation and egg foraging. Northern pike and snapping turtles are known to eat ducklings, whereas skunks, minks, crows, and magpies steal and eat redhead eggs.

== Population status ==
The North American Waterfowl Management Plan for redheads is 760,000 North American birds. The population size has increased in the past few decades to well over 1.4 million birds. Redheads make up 2% of North America's duck population and only 1% of its harvested ducks. Populations may be stable because of restrictive bag limits for the species. In addition, the species uses semipermanent and permanent wetlands to breed, and these habitats are less likely to be affected by drought. For future management of the species, organizations are looking into wetland conservation.

== Behavior ==
=== Migration ===
==== Spring ====
Redheads begin to leave their winter range in late January and February with the northernmost birds migrating by late April. In western North America, migrants begin arriving in Oregon, British Columbia, and Colorado in February. In central North America, migrants arrive as soon as temperatures open wetlands and lakes, which can range from late February (Nebraska) to early May (Alberta, Manitoba, and Iowa). In the Great Lakes region and northeastern North America, migrants also arrive as soon as bodies of water thaw.

==== Fall ====
Western birds migrate through the Great Basin to the Pacific Coast. In British Columbia, fall migration begins in September and continues through October. The Great Salt Lake region is of particular importance to migrants in the western United States. Central North American redheads begin migrating earlier, around August/September and go through the Great Plains to the Texas coast. Eastern populations migrate through the Great Lakes region to the Atlantic Coast or Florida from October to November. Most redheads winter along the Gulf of Mexico (offshore Louisiana, Florida, and Mexico). However, eastern populations winter in South Carolina.

=== Reproduction ===
==== Mating ====
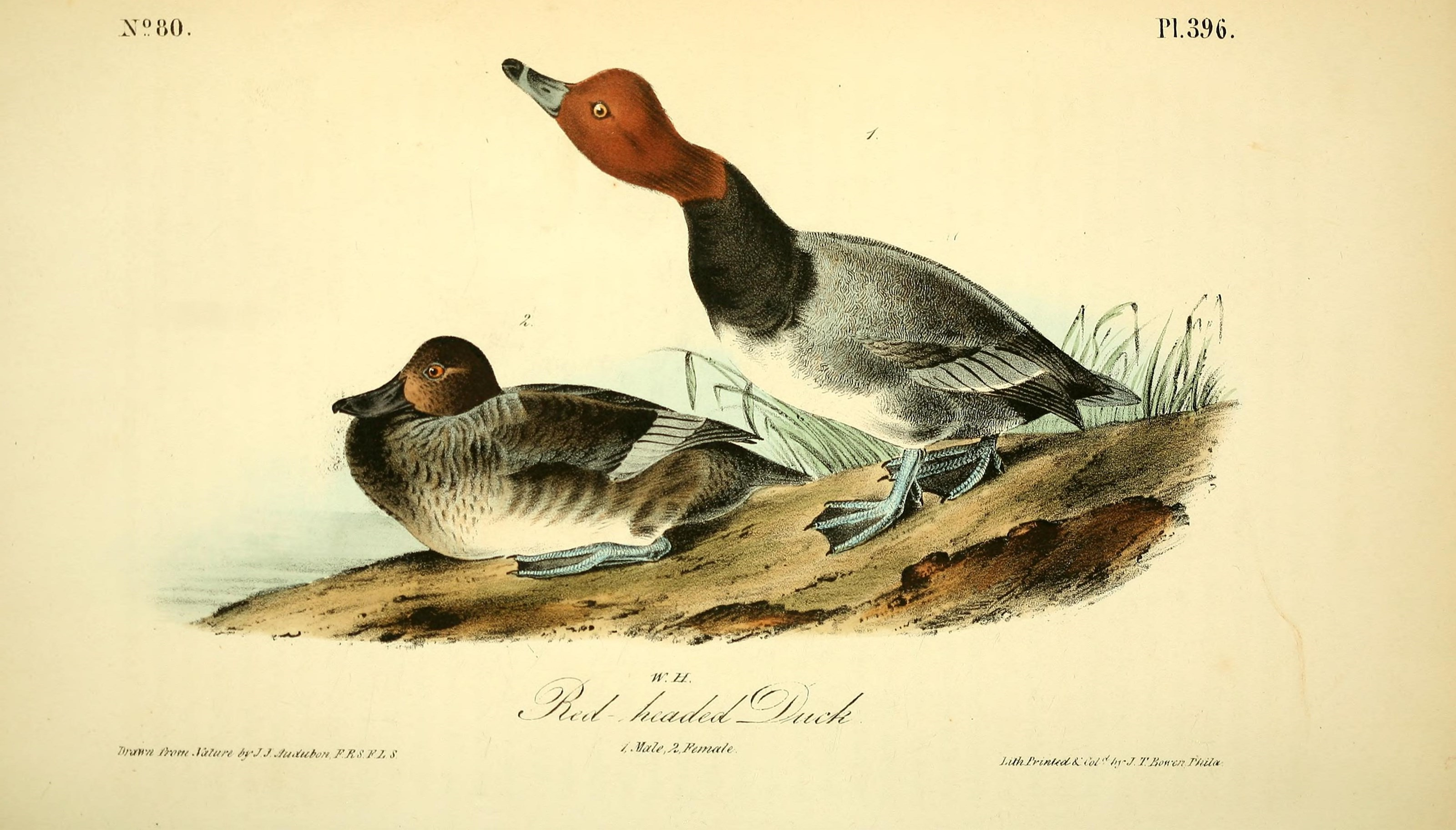
Neck-stretching courtship ritual of the adult male redhead depicted in Audubon's Birds of America in 1843

Redheads flock together on lakes and other bodies of water, but migrate in pairs, which are formed in December or January through elaborate courtship rituals. Unpaired redheads migrate together in a "courting party" that can number up to 25 individuals, enabling them to find a mate within the group. The pair bonds are established yearly through a long courtship process. Males begin this process through neck-kinking and head-throwing displays while emitting a cat-like call. The male continues by initiating a neck-stretching display while producing a cough-like call. If interested, the female produces inciting calls towards the male while performing alternate lateral and chin-lifting movements. The male then swims ahead of her and turns the back of his head towards the female. Once courtship is finished, the two birds are paired for the year. The male initiates copulation by alternating bill dipping and preening dorsally towards the female, upon which the female may return to the male.

==== Nesting ====
Once copulation is completed, female redheads begin forming nests. They are built with thick and strong plant material in emergent vegetation, such as hard stem bulrush, cattails, and sedges, over or near standing water. Redheads do not defend their territory or home range; they are instead social while in their breeding ground. This is thought to facilitate brood parasitism on other pochards, which is particularly prevalent on the part of younger, less experienced redhead females. In this process, redheads lay their eggs in other pochards' nests, including the canvasback, ring-necked duck, and greater and lesser scaups, and this parasitism by redheads reduces the hatching success of other pochards' eggs, especially those of the canvasback. The parasitic relationship between the redhead and other pochards promotes hybridization between the species; redhead hybrids with the ring-necked duck, canvasback, and the greater and lesser scaups have been found. Canvasback × redhead hybrids can be fertile. The eggs measure 5.1–6.7 cm (2.0–2.6 in) in length and 3.9–4.7 cm (1.5–1.9 in) in width. Brood sizes range from five to seven young, with the mother abandoning the chicks at 8 weeks old, 2–4 weeks before they are capable of flight.

==== Vocalizations ====
Little information exists on redhead vocalizations outside of breeding calls. When the neck is fully extended in the neck-stretching display, males emit a cat-like wheee-oww. Males may also produce a soft coughing call, although this call is less frequent. Females emit a soft errrr note when inciting a male.

=== Feeding habits ===
All pochards have similar diets that include both plant and animal materials. Redheads undergo a niche switch when breeding and wintering. During the breeding season, redheads eat as much animal matter as possible, including gastropods, mollusks, and insect larvae. They will eat the occasional grass and other emergent vegetation. However, once they fly south, they change their diet to include mostly plant material, consisting of pondweeds, wild rice, wild celery, wigeon grass, bulrushes, muskgrass, and shoal grass.

Gastropods known as food of A. americana include: Acteocina canaliculata, Acteon punctostriatus, Anachis avara, Anachis obesa, Caecum nitidum, Calliostoma sp., Cerithidea pliculosa, Cerithium lutosum, Crepidula convexa, Diastoma varium, Melanella sp., Mitrella lunata, Nassarius acutus, Nassarius vibex, Natica spp., Neritina virginea, Odostomia trifida, Olivella minuta, Olivella watermani, Polinices sp., Pyramidellidae, Pyrgocythara plicosa, Rissoina catesbyana, Sayella livida, Turbonilla spp., Turbonilla interrupta, and Vitrinella spp.

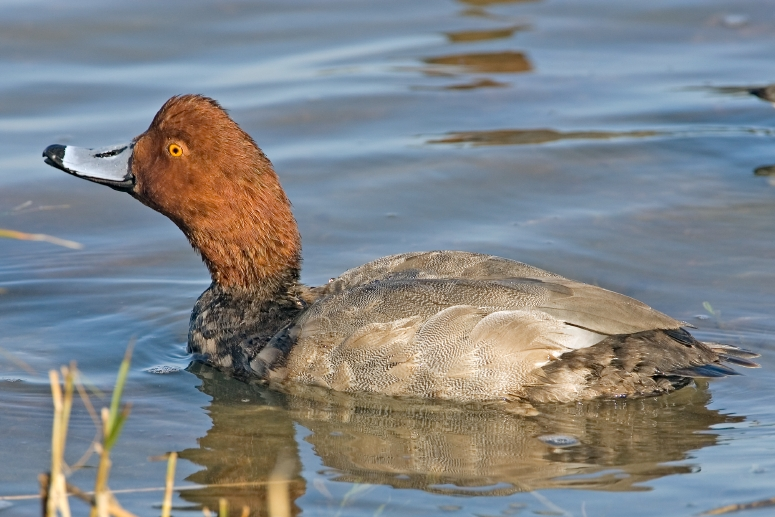
Breeding male

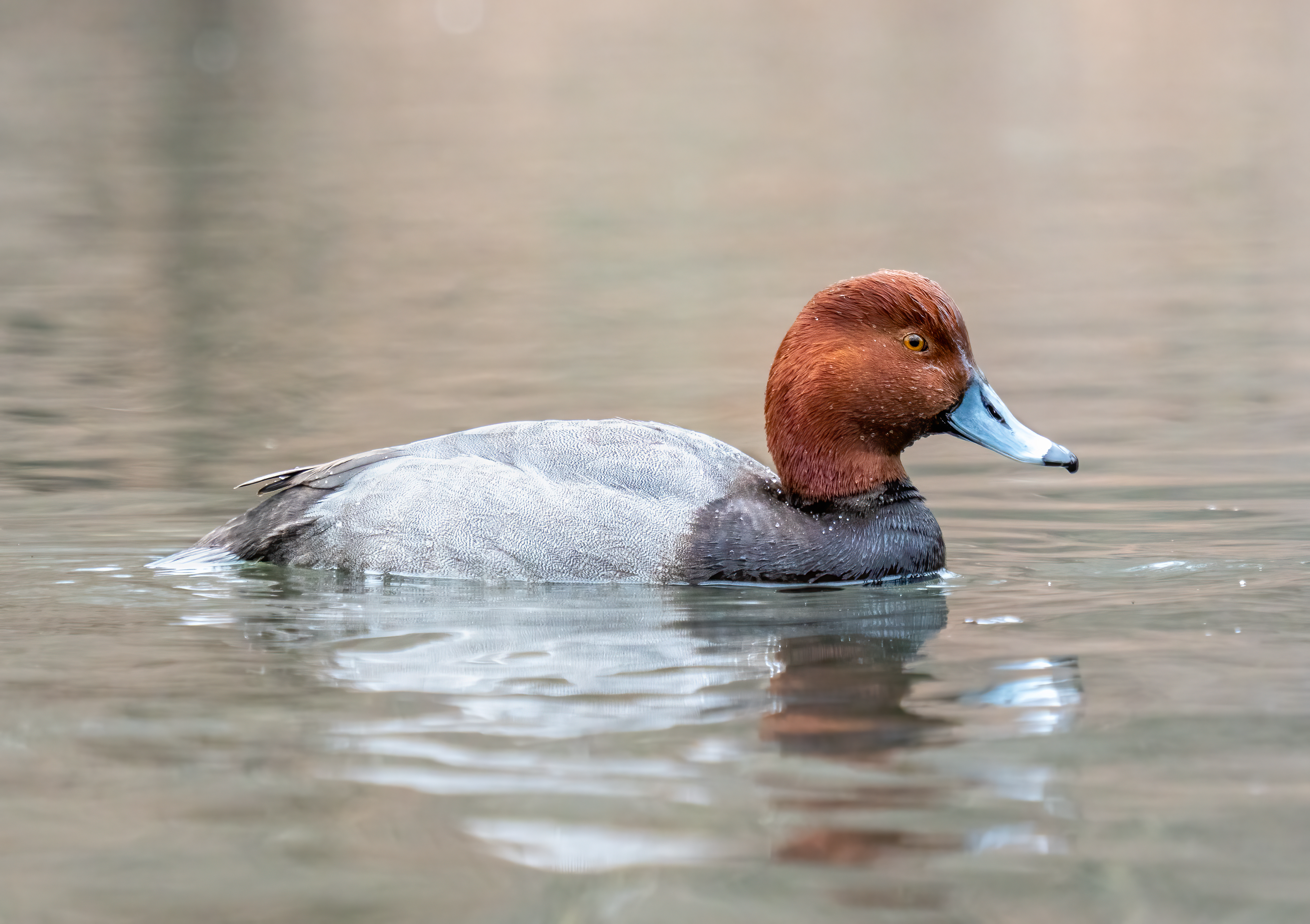
Breeding male

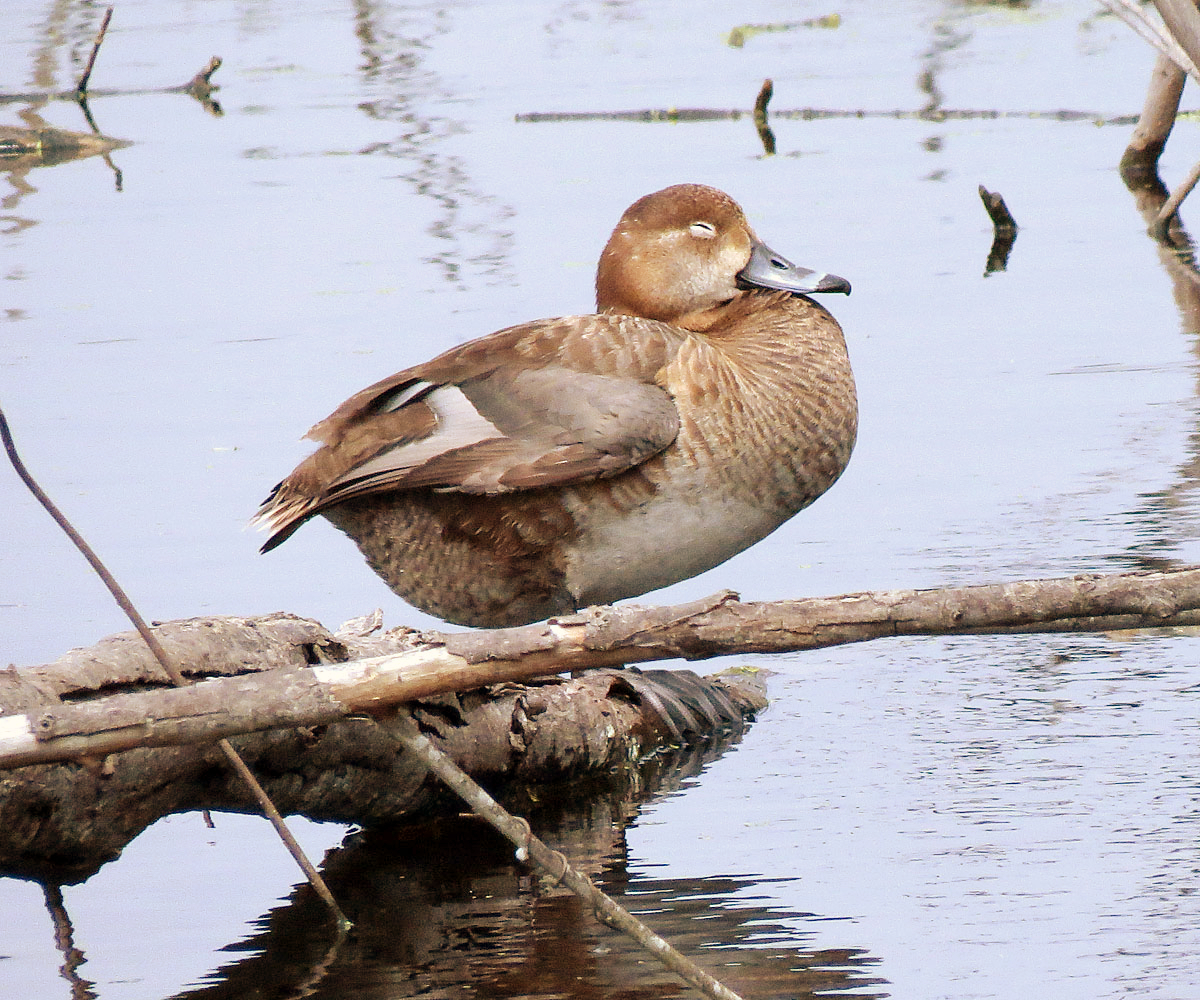
Adult Female
