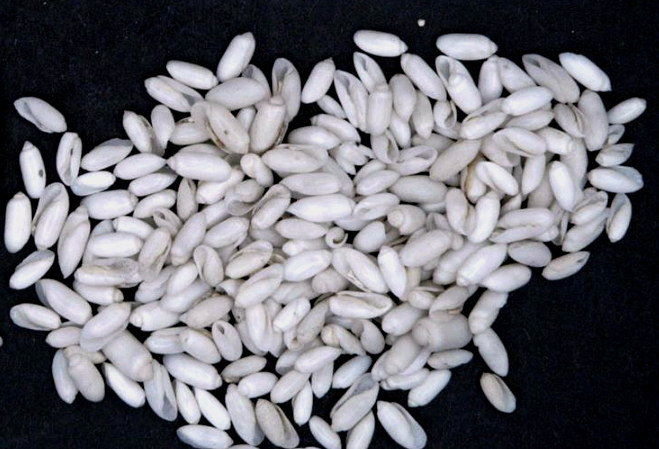
- A collection of shells of Acteocina bullata (museum specimens at Naturalis Biodiversity Center)

Scientific classification
- Domain: Eukaryota
- Kingdom: Animalia
- Phylum: Mollusca
- Class: Gastropoda
- Order: Cephalaspidea
- Family: Tornatinidae
- Genus: Acteocina
- Species: A. bullata

Binomial name
- Acteocina bullata (Kiener, 1834)

Synonyms
- Tornatella bullata Kiener, 1834 (basionym); Utriculastra (Tornastra) bullata (Kiener, 1834)

= Acteocina bullata =

Species of gastropod

Acteocina bullata, common name the striate barrel bubble, is a species of small sea snail, a marine opisthobranch gastropod mollusk in the family Acteocinidae, the barrel bubble snails.

== Description ==
The length of the shell varies between 5 mm and 10 mm.

The small shell is oblong and cylindrical. It is of a diaphanous white. It is very fine and shows very close transverse striae cover the whole of the shell. The short, conical spire is composed of five whorls, the sutures of which are canaliculated. The oblong aperture is narrow in its two upper thirds, and dilated at its base. The thin outer lip is round, and notched at the upper part at its union with the inner lip. The columella shows one fold.

== Distribution ==
This species occurs in the Caribbean Sea, the Gulf of Mexico and off Puerto Rico; also off East Brazil.
