= Acteocina infrequens =

Scientific classification
- Kingdom: Animalia
- Phylum: Mollusca
- Class: Gastropoda
- Order: Cephalaspidea
- Family: Tornatinidae
- Genus: Acteocina
- Species: A. infrequens

Binomial name
- Acteocina infrequens (C. B. Adams, 1852)

Synonyms
- Acteocina angustior Baker & Hanna, 1927; Acteocina magdalenensis Dall, 1919; Bulla (Tornatina) infrequens C. B. Adams, 1852 (basionym); Bulla infrequens C. B. Adams, 1852 (original combination)

Species of gastropod

Acteocina infrequens, common name the Magdalena barrel bubble, is a species of small sea snail, a marine opisthobranch gastropod mollusk in the family Acteocinidae, the barrel bubble snails.

== Description ==
The length of the shell attains 6.7 mm, its diameter 2.5 mm.

The small, slender shell has a subcylindric shape. It is translucent white and is polished. The shell contains four whorls. The protoconch is minute, subglobular and transparent. The suture is distinct, more or less channeled. The spire is short but distinctly turreted. The aperture is narrow. The outer lip is straight, rounding below into the thickened columella which has a strong plait with a groove behind it. The body has a slight glaze.

== Distribution ==
This marine species occurs in Magdalena Bay, Lower California; off Baja California to Pacific Panama.
