= J. exigua =

J. exigua may refer to:

- Jaminia exigua, a sea snail
- Janthina exigua, a violet snail
- Jardinella exigua, a freshwater snail
