= Acteocina smirna =

Scientific classification
- Domain: Eukaryota
- Kingdom: Animalia
- Phylum: Mollusca
- Class: Gastropoda
- Order: Cephalaspidea
- Family: Tornatinidae
- Genus: Acteocina
- Species: A. smirna

Binomial name
- Acteocina smirna W. H. Dall, 1919

Species of gastropod

Acteocina smirna is a species of small sea snail, a marine opisthobranch gastropod mollusk in the family Acteocinidae, the barrel bubble snails.

== Description ==
The length of the shell attains 4 mm, its diameter 2 mm.

The minute shell is white, with a yellowish periostracum. It contains about four whorls with a very minute subglobular hardly projecting glossy nucleus. The summit of the spire with the whorl is but little raised, flattish but not excavated between the suture and the bluntly rounded shoulder. The shell in front of the shoulder is subcylindrical, with fine axial incremental lines. The aperture is narrow. The outer lip is thin, nearly straight, rounding in front into the rather wide, slightly excavated columella which near the body carries a single strong plait. The body shows a thin coat of enamel, the umbilical region slightly impressed but imperforate.

== Distribution ==
This marine species occurs from Southern California to Panama
