= Boonea multituberculata =

Scientific classification
- Kingdom: Animalia
- Phylum: Mollusca
- Class: Gastropoda
- Family: Pyramidellidae
- Genus: Boonea
- Species: B. multituberculata

Binomial name
- Boonea multituberculata (Castellanos, 1982)

Species of gastropod

Boonea multituberculata is a species of sea snail, a marine gastropod mollusk in the family Pyramidellidae, the pyrams and their allies. The species is one of a number within the genus Chrysallida.
