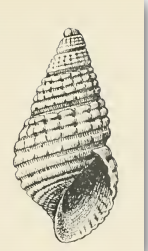
- Apertural view of the shell of Boonea cincta, by W. H. Dall.

Scientific classification
- Kingdom: Animalia
- Phylum: Mollusca
- Class: Gastropoda
- Family: Pyramidellidae
- Genus: Boonea; Robertson, 1978

Type species
- Jaminia seminuda C.B. Adams, 1839

Synonyms
- Odostomia (Boonea) Robertson, 1978

= Boonea =

Genus of gastropods

Boonea is a small genus of small sea snails, pyramidellid gastropod mollusks.

This genus is currently placed in the subfamily Odostomiinae, of the family Pyramidellidae (according to the taxonomy of Bouchet & Rocroi (2005)).

== Distribution ==
The vast majority of the species within this genus are only known to be distributed within North American waters, Hudson Bay is a very populated location for the Boonea genus.

== Life habits ==
Little is known about the biology of the members of this genus. As most members of the Pyramidellidae sensu lato, they are most likely ectoparasites.

The species Boonea impressa is known to be a severe pest of the edible oyster Crassostrea virginica (Wilson, Powell & Ray, 1988).

== Species ==
There are thirteen accepted species within Boonea:

- Boonea bisuturalis (Say, 1822)
- Boonea cincta (Carpenter, 1864)
- Boonea grutensis Güller & Zelaya, 2019
- Boonea impressa (Say, 1822)
- Boonea jadisi (Olsson & McGinty, 1958)
- Boonea kinpana Hori & Nakamura, 1999
- Boonea multituberculata (Castellanos, 1982)
- Boonea okamurai Hori & Okutani, 1996
- Boonea oregonensis (Dall & Bartsch, 1907)
- Boonea scymnocelata Pimenta, Absalão & Miyaji, 2009
- Boonea seminuda (C. B. Adams, 1839) - type species, as Jaminia seminuda
- Boonea suoana Hori & Nakamura, 1999
- Boonea umboniocola Hori and Okutani, 1995
Drawing of a shell specimen of Boonea bisuturalis, by G. W. Tryon.

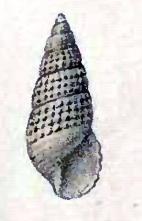
Drawing of a shell specimen of Boonea impressa.

Drawing of a shell specimen of Boonea seminuda.
