= Boonea kinpana =

Scientific classification
- Kingdom: Animalia
- Phylum: Mollusca
- Class: Gastropoda
- Family: Pyramidellidae
- Genus: Boonea
- Species: B. kinpana

Binomial name
- Boonea kinpana Hori & Nakamura, 1999

Synonyms
- Odostomia (Boonea) kinpana Hori & Nakamura, 1999

Species of gastropod

Boonea kinpana is a species of sea snail, a marine gastropod mollusk in the family Pyramidellidae, the pyrams and their allies. The species is one of eleven species within the Boonea genus of gastropods.

== Distribution ==
This marine species occurs off the coasts of Japan. The species is also populous throughout marine terrain off the coast of Yamaguchi Prefecture.
