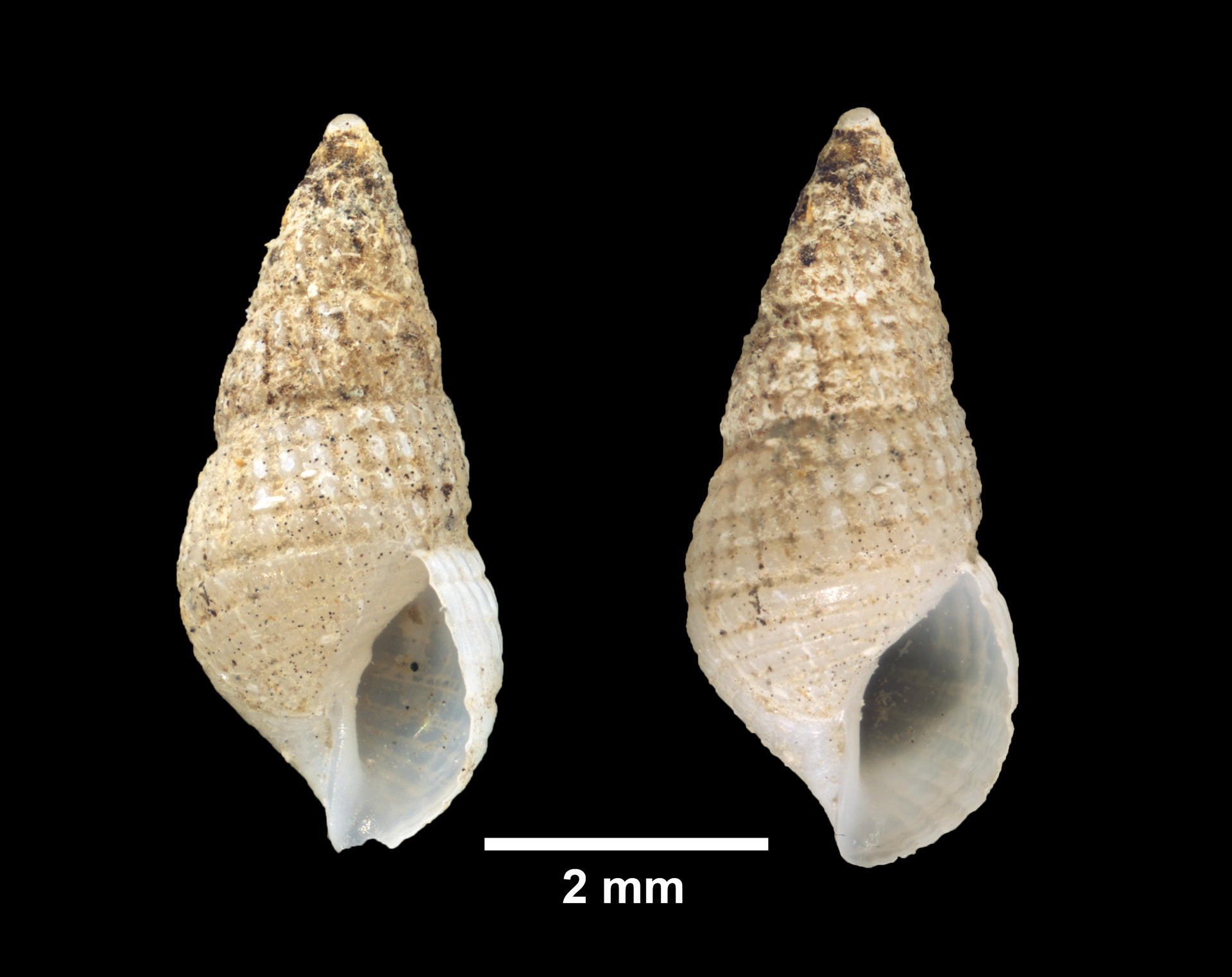
- Drawing of a shell of Boonea seminuda

Scientific classification
- Kingdom: Animalia
- Phylum: Mollusca
- Class: Gastropoda
- Family: Pyramidellidae
- Genus: Boonea
- Species: B. seminuda

Binomial name
- Boonea seminuda (C. B. Adams, 1839)

Synonyms
- Chrysallida buijsei auct. non Jong & Coomans, 1988; Chemnitzia seminuda (C. B. Adams, 1839); Jaminia seminuda C. B. Adams, 1839; Menestho granatina (Dall, 1884); Menestho seminuda (C. B. Adams, 1839); Menestho toyatani (Henderson & Bartsch, 1914); Menestho willisi (Bartsch, 1909); Odostomia granatina Dall, 1884; Odostomia seminuda (C. B. Adams, 1839); Odostomia (Boonea) seminuda (C. B. Adams, 1839); Odostomia toyatani Henderson & Bartsch, 1914; Odostomia willisi Bartsch, 1909

= Boonea seminuda =

Species of gastropod

Boonea seminuda is a species of sea snail, a marine gastropod mollusk in the family Pyramidellidae, the pyrams and their allies.

The preferred host of this ectoparasite is the common slipper shell Crepidula fornicata or the Atlantic bay scallop Argopecten irradians.

== Description ==
The glossy white, shell is translucent. Its length measures 3.75 mm. The teleoconch contains seven convex whorls. Those of the spire and upper half of the body are longitudinally plicate. They are crossed by three spiral lines, giving a granulated appearance. The folds terminate at the periphery. Below it on the body whorl are four spiral striae. The suture is distinct, but indistinctly margined. The columellar fold is inconspicuous.

== Distribution ==
This marine species occurs in the following locations:

- North West Atlantic Ocean, including Gulf of Maine
- Caribbean Sea (Colombia)
- Gulf of Mexico (Mexico)
