= Boonea jadisi =

Scientific classification
- Kingdom: Animalia
- Phylum: Mollusca
- Class: Gastropoda
- Family: Pyramidellidae
- Genus: Boonea
- Species: B. jadisi

Binomial name
- Boonea jadisi (Olsson & McGinty, 1958)

Synonyms
- Odostomia (Boonea) jadisi (Olsson & McGinty, 1958); Odostomia (Chrysallida) jadisi Olsson & McGinty, 1958 (basionym); Menestho jadisi (Olsson & McGinty, 1958)

Species of gastropod

Boonea jadisi is a species of sea snail, a marine gastropod mollusk in the family Pyramidellidae, the pyrams and their allies. The species is one of eleven known species within the Boonea genus of gastropods.

== Description ==
The shell grows to a length of approximately 3.5 mm.

== Distribution ==
The vast majority of this marine species is distributed in mostly American waters, these include the following geographical locations:

- Atlantic Ocean: Northeast region of Brazil, Uruguay
- Gulf of Mexico: Florida
- Caribbean Sea: Costa Rica, Panama, Colombia, Suriname
