= Boonea scymnocelata =

Scientific classification
- Kingdom: Animalia
- Phylum: Mollusca
- Class: Gastropoda
- Family: Pyramidellidae
- Genus: Boonea
- Species: B. scymnocelata

Binomial name
- Boonea scymnocelata Pimenta, Absalão & Miyaji, 2009

Species of gastropod

Boonea scymnocelata is a species of sea snail, a marine gastropod mollusk in the family Pyramidellidae, the pyrams and their allies. The species is one of eleven known species within the Boonea genus of gastropods.

== Description ==
The shell of this ectoparasitic marine species attains a length of approximately 2 mm.

== Distribution ==
This marine species occurs off the coasts of Brazil at depths between 79 m and 500 m below sea level.
