= Layout hunting =

Waterfowl hunting technique

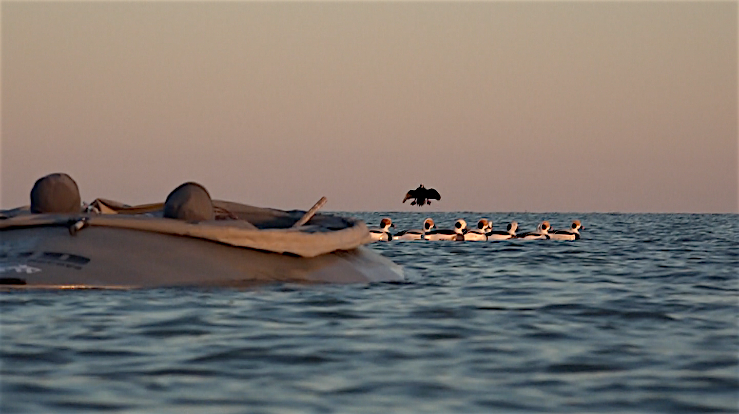
Two-man layout boat and decoys

Layout boat hunting is a sub specialty of traditional waterfowl hunting which is done in a low-profile un-motorized boat with a unique design that allows the hunter to maintain a close position to the water in order to conceal them in open water areas that are frequented by diver and ocean ducks. This is a sport with a long history going back to market hunters and boat-mounted punt guns. The main focus of the layout boat is to put the hunter very close to the decoys, or even among them, for additional concealment. This makes for dramatic hunting scenarios where a decoying bird comes extremely close to the hunter and boat.

Most layout boats are used for diver duck or ocean duck hunting where an open deep water waterfowl species frequent. Sometimes they are deployed in marshes for more traditional puddle duck hunting or goose hunting.

== Hunting ==
Open water layout boat hunters are known for operating on the riskier side of waterfowl hunting due to hunting on large areas of water such as the Great Lakes and oceans. They are known to target diving diver ducks such as bluebills (greater scaup), canvasback, goldeneye, scoter and eider to name a few.

Layout hunters usually deploy large spreads of diver ducks in open water areas. Many successful patterns have been created for these spreads over the years. Some layout hunters will use as many as 300 decoys or more. Layout boats are commonly called "rigs" because the usually require a larger tender boat to do the work of setting up a decoy spread, changing hunter and retrieving downed bird. Tender boats also play a much more important role of watchdog should anything go wrong. Every rig has its own system for setting and retrieving decoys. Some hunters employee long main lines (also called mother lines) with 10 to 20 decoys attached to a single line via short snap ropes. Other hunters use single line decoys with no main line at all. All these methods are effective.

Layout boats are positioned very close or inside the decoy spread, making it harder for waterfowl to distinguish the boat, and the hunters lay back flat into the boat hiding themselves from the birds. Many times this done on a rotation basis with other hunters working the tender boat. Small layout boats (10 to 14 foot (3.0 to 4.3 m)) can weather some very rough water which adds the element of danger to the sport.

== Layout boat ==
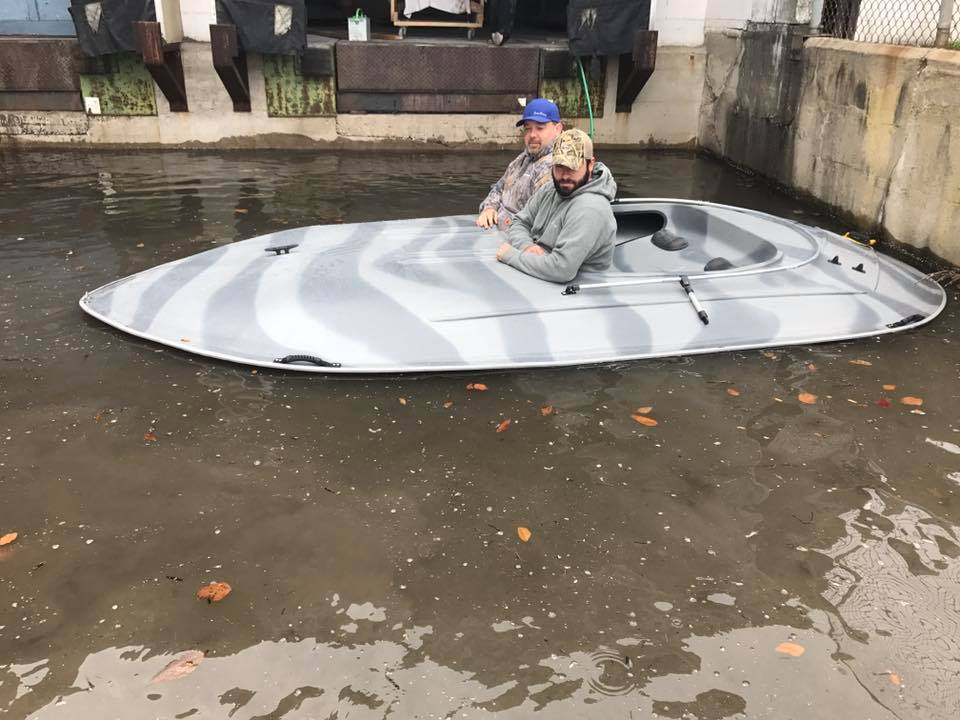
A two-man layout boat

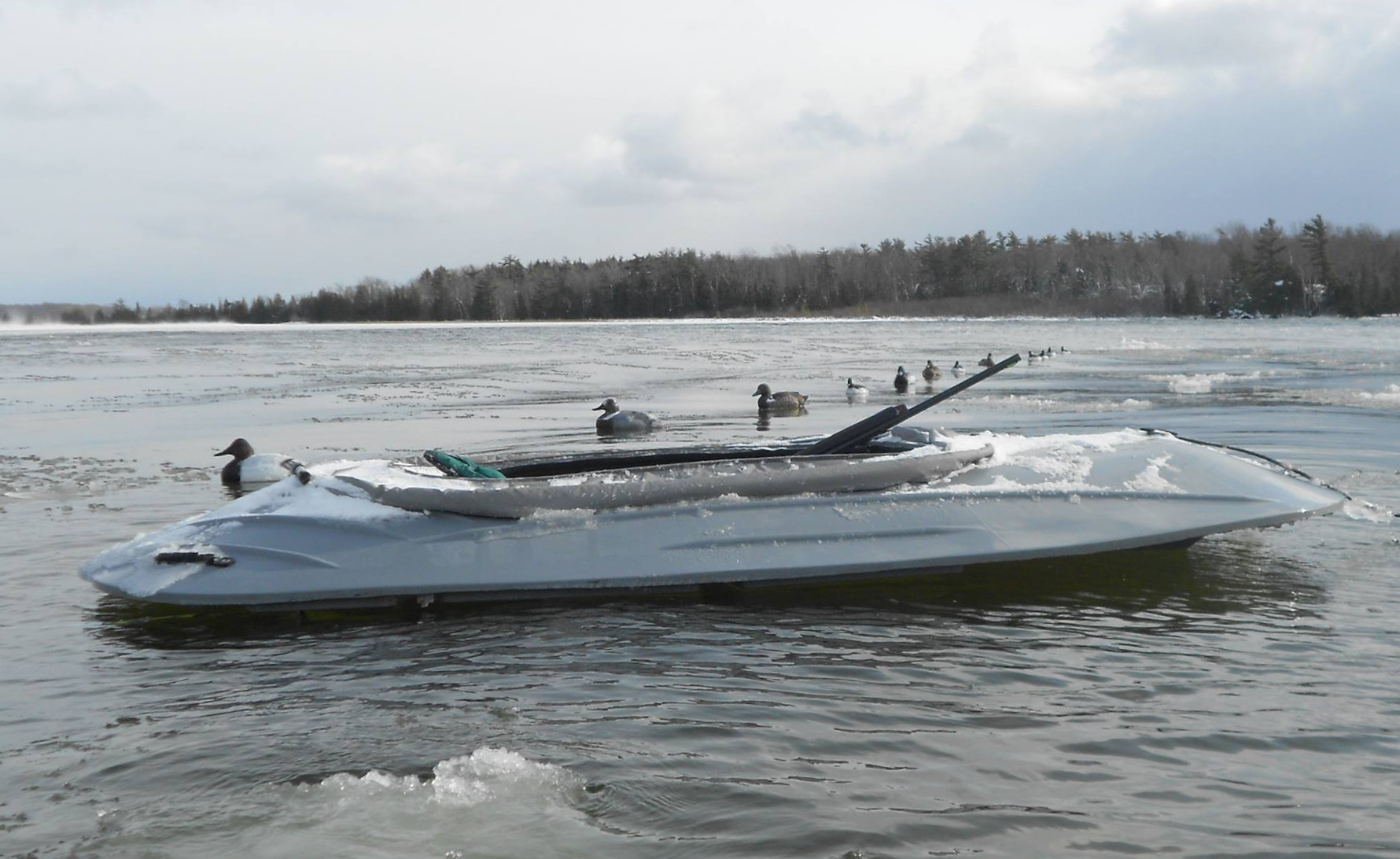
One-man layout boat with decoys

A layout boat is a low-profile un-motorized oval-like boat that is used by diver duck hunters to hide in when hunting in open water. They are unique to a specialized form of waterfowl hunting called Layout hunting. Most layout boats are used for diver duck or ocean duck hunting where open deep water waterfowl species frequent. Sometimes they are deployed in marshes for more traditional puddle duck hunting or goose hunting. Layout boats come in designs such as pumpkin seed, oval, and box like just to name a few. They come in one- and two-man models. These boats are painted to match the color of the water and sit very low in the water. The main focus of the layout boat is to put the hunter very close to the decoys if not in them for additional concealment. This makes for very dramatic hunting scenarios where a decoying bird comes extremely close to the hunter and boat. They are used to target diver ducks such as bluebills (greater scaup), canvasback, goldeneye, scoters and eider to name a few. This is because divers often fly low on the water and will not notice the low sides of the boat. Layout boats are often placed within the decoy spread, so the decoys help further conceal the sides of the boat.

Layout boats come in designs such as pumpkin seed, oval, box-like. They come in one- and two-man models.

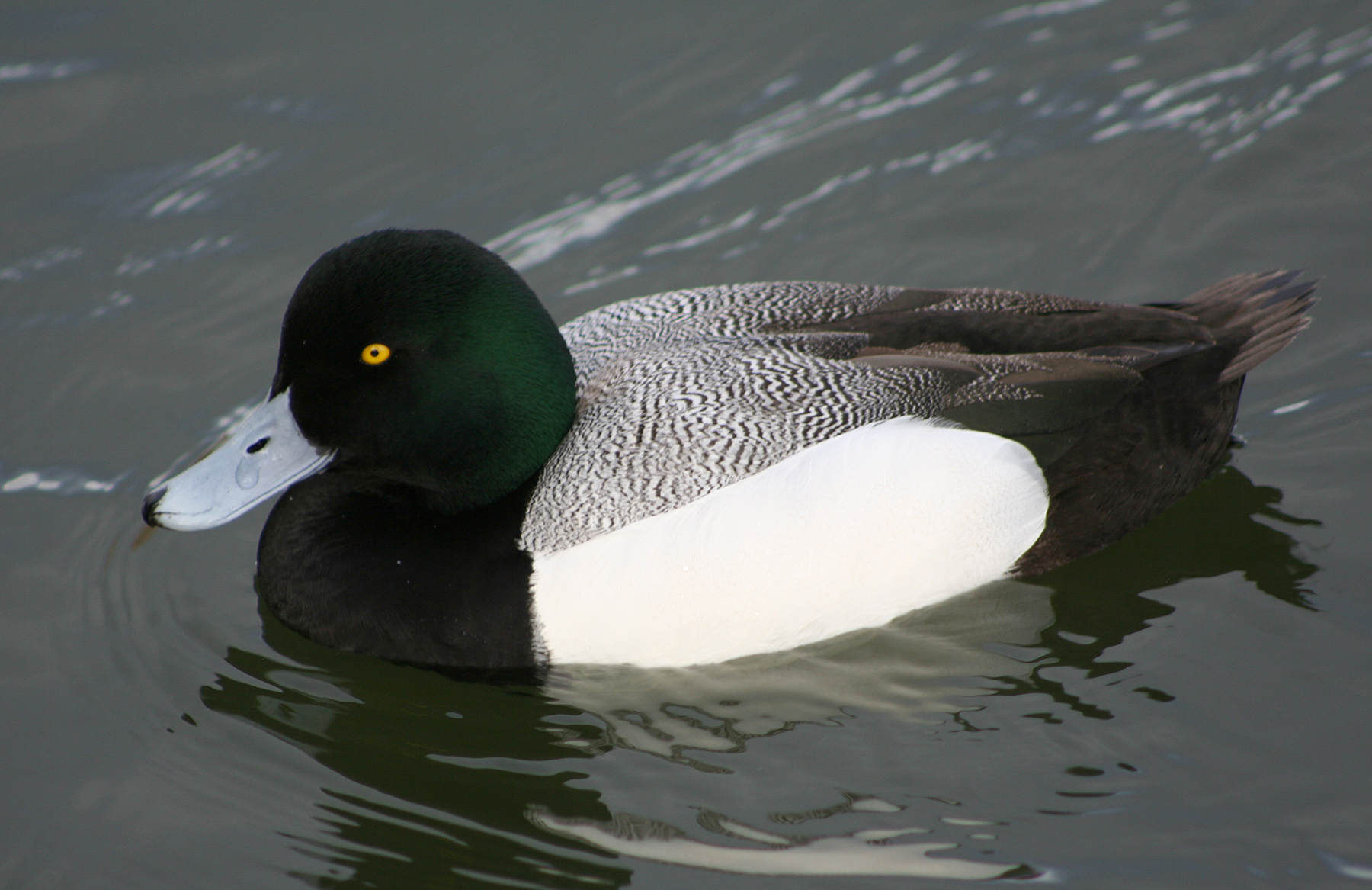
"Bluebill" scaup

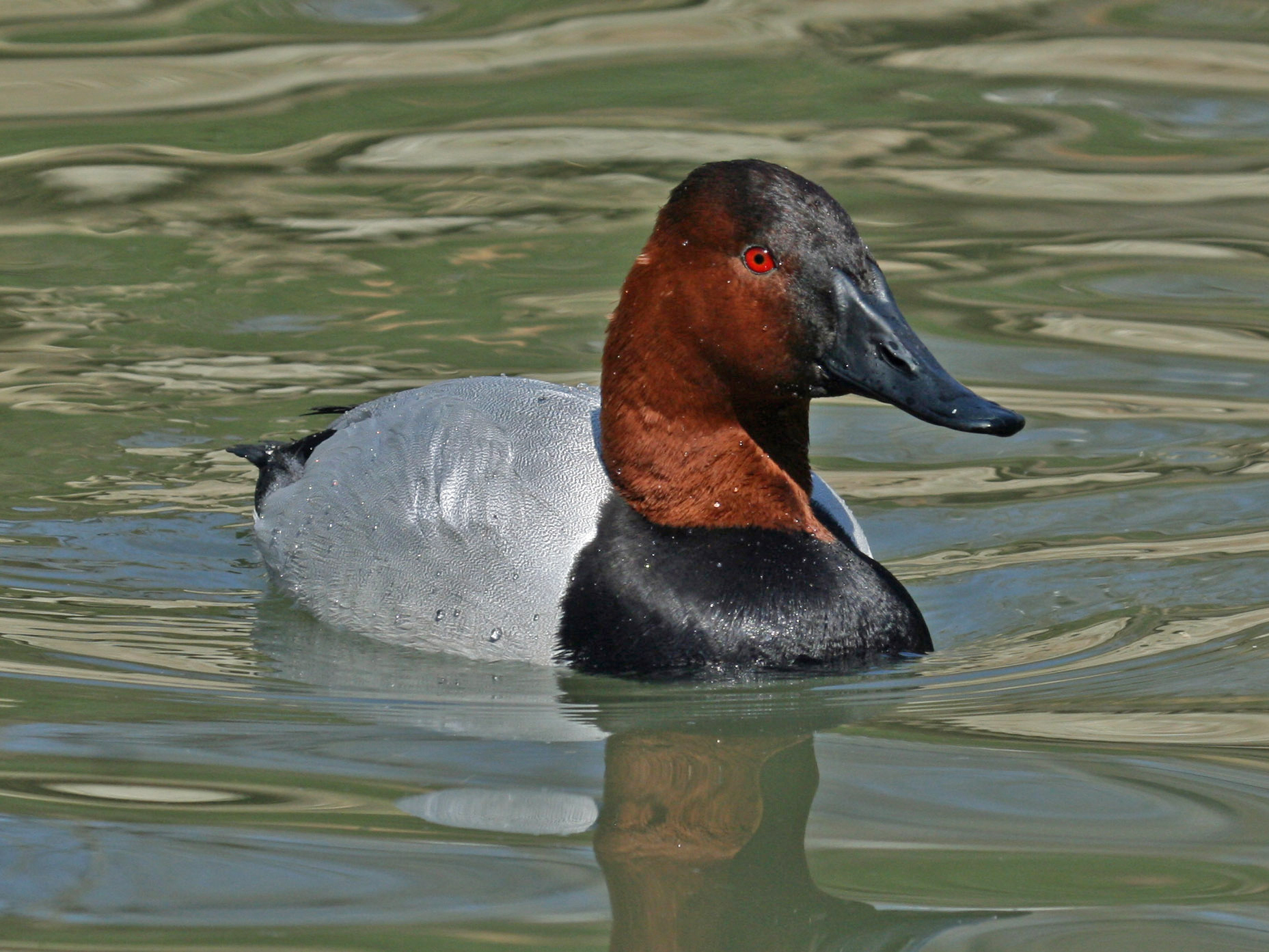
Canvasback

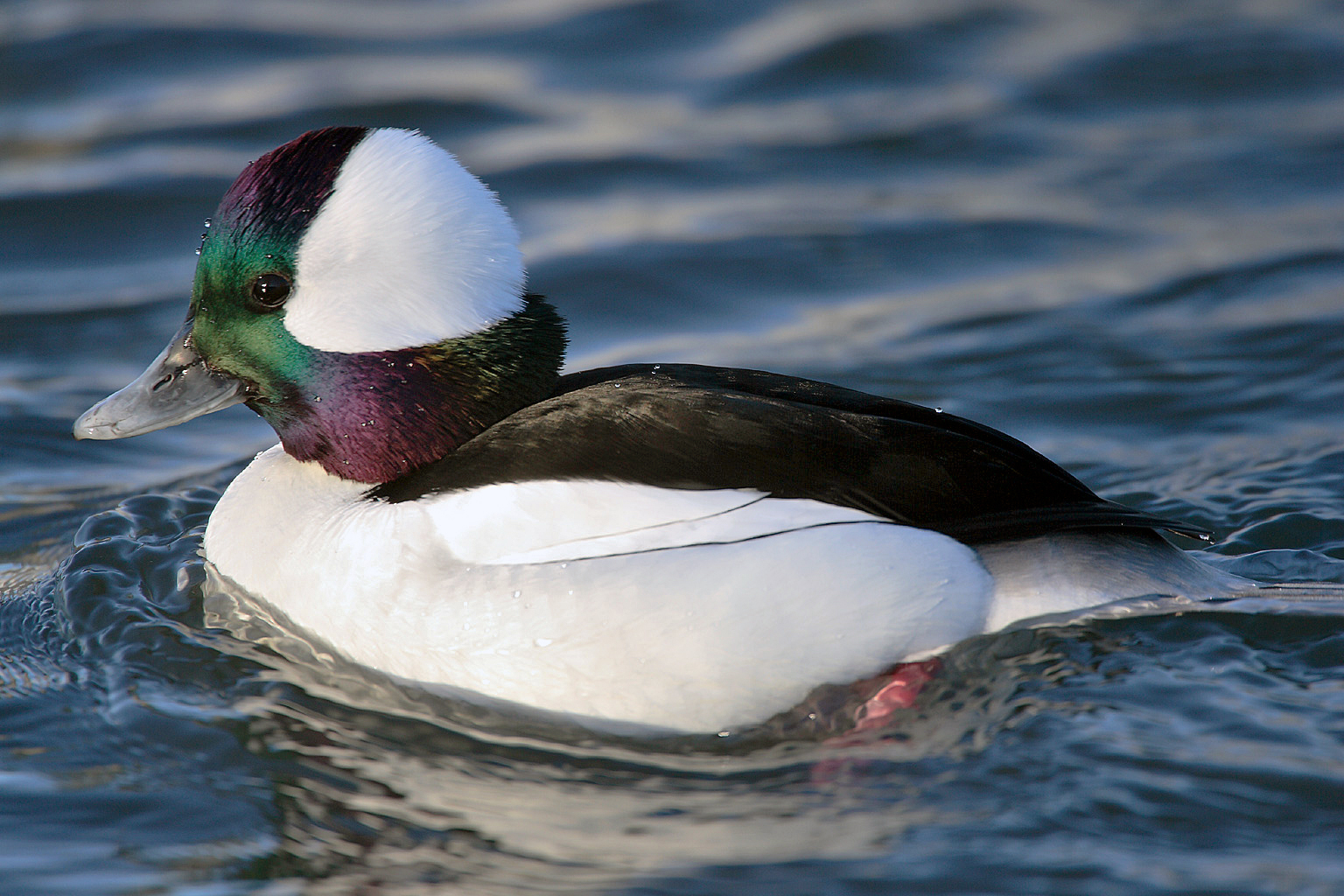
Bufflehead
