= Indian celery =

Indian celery is a common name for several plants and may refer to:

- Heracleum maximum, native to North America
- Lomatium nudicaule, native to western North America
- Seseli diffusum, native to India

== See also ==
- Wild celery
