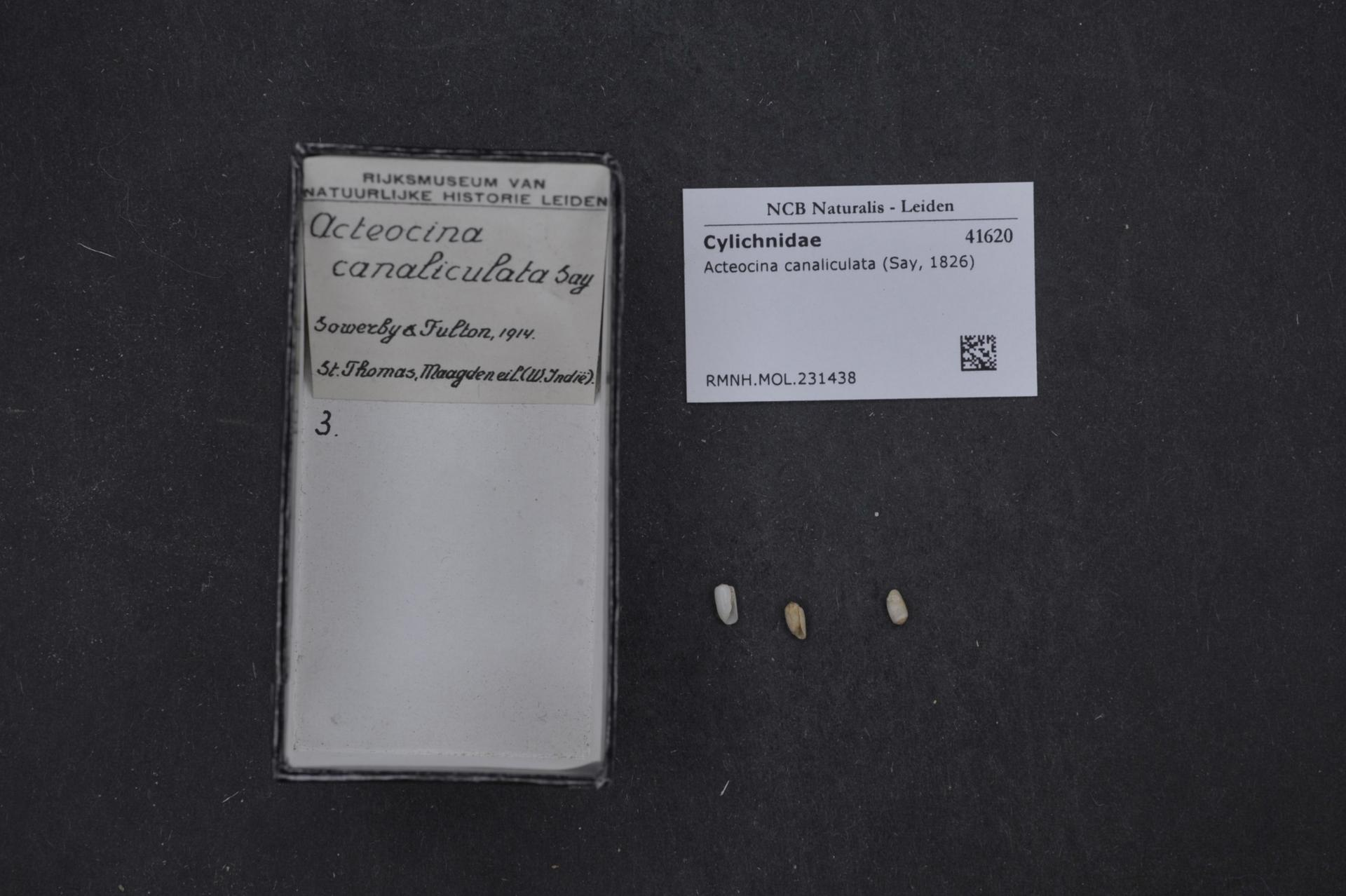

Scientific classification
- Kingdom: Animalia
- Phylum: Mollusca
- Class: Gastropoda
- Order: Cephalaspidea
- Family: Tornatinidae
- Genus: Acteocina
- Species: A. canaliculata

Binomial name
- Acteocina canaliculata (Say, 1826)

= Acteocina canaliculata =

Species of gastropod

Acteocina canaliculata is a species of gastropods belonging to the family Tornatinidae.

The species is found in America. It mostly inhabits the waters of the east coast of North America. The veliger larvae feed on plankton.
