= Boonea okamurai =

Scientific classification
- Kingdom: Animalia
- Phylum: Mollusca
- Class: Gastropoda
- Family: Pyramidellidae
- Genus: Boonea
- Species: B. okamurai

Binomial name
- Boonea okamurai Hori & Okutani, 1996

Synonyms
- Odostomia (Boonea) okumurai Hori, S. & T.A. Okutani, 1996

Species of gastropod

Boonea okamurai is a species of sea snail, a marine gastropod mollusk in the family Pyramidellidae, the pyrams and their allies. The species is one of eleven known species within the Boonea genus of gastropods.

== Distribution ==
This marine species occurs throughout marine terrain within the Pacific Ocean off the east coasts of Japan.
