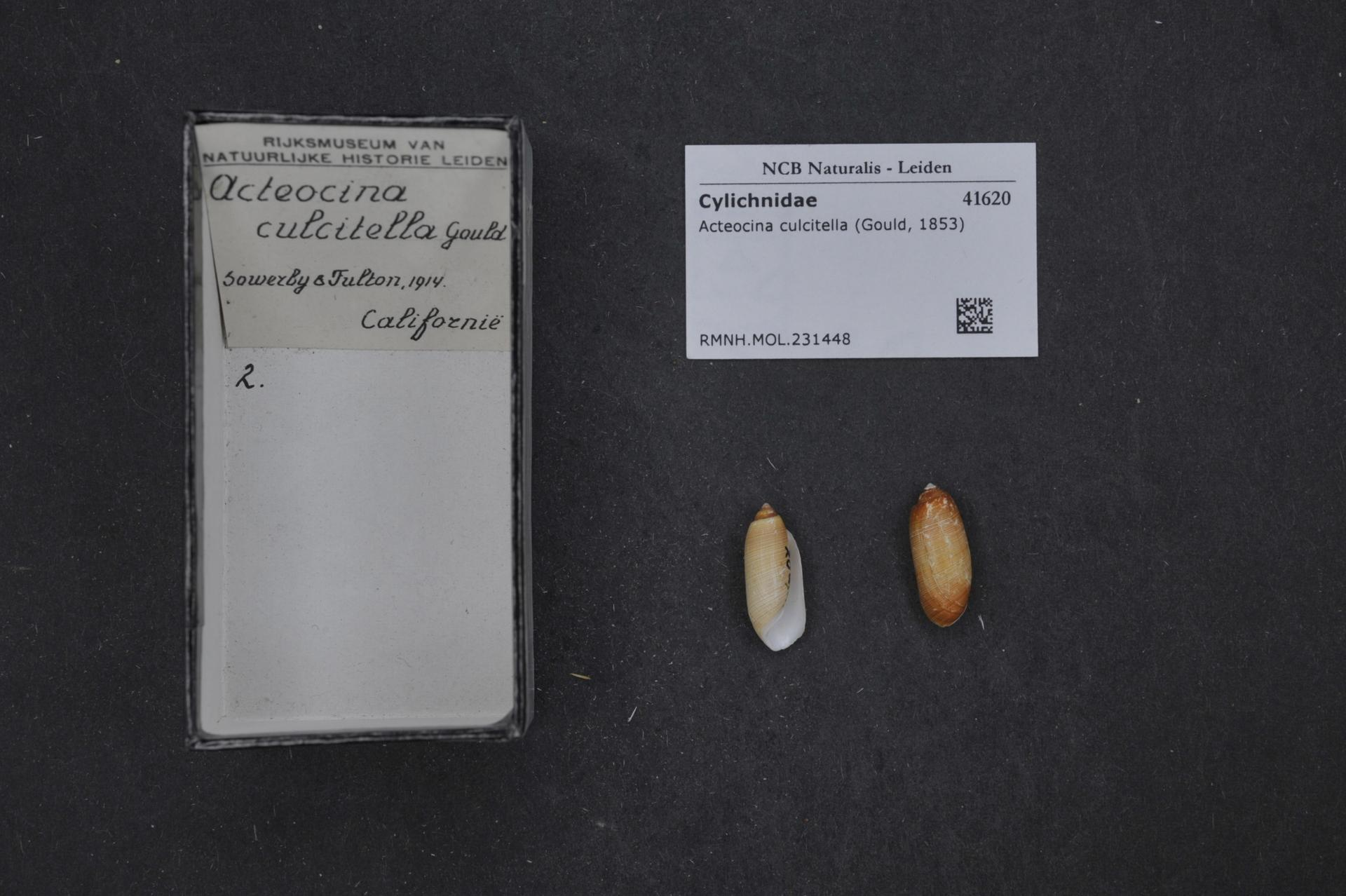
- Acteocina culcitella shells

Scientific classification
- Kingdom: Animalia
- Phylum: Mollusca
- Class: Gastropoda
- Order: Cephalaspidea
- Superfamily: Bulloidea
- Family: Tornatinidae
- Genus: Acteocina; J. E. Gray, 1847

Type species
- †Acteon wetherelli I. Lea, 1833

Synonyms
- Actaeocina [sic] (misspelling); Acteocina (Acteocina) J.E. Gray, 1847; Bulla (Tornatina) A. Adams, 1850; Didontoglossa Annandale, 1924; Tornataiha [sic]; Tornatina A. Adams, 1850; Utriculastra Thiele, 1925; Utriculastra (Tornastra) Ev. Marcus, 1977; Utriculastra (Utriculastra) Thiele, 1925

= Acteocina =

Genus of gastropods

Acteocina is a genus of very small sea snails, bubble snails, marine opisthobranch gastropod mollusks in the family Tornatinidae, the canoe bubbles or chalice bubble snails.

== Species ==
Species within the genus Acteocina include:

- Acteocina androyensis (Bozzetti, 2009)
- Acteocina apicina (Gould, 1859)
- Acteocina apiculata (Tate, 1879)
- Acteocina atrata (Mikkelsen & Mikkelsen, 1984)
- Acteocina bermudensis (Vanatta, 1901)
- Acteocina bullata (Kiener, 1834)
- Acteocina canaliculata (Say, 1826)
- Acteocina candei (d'Orbigny, 1841)
- Acteocina capitata (Pilsbry, 1895)
- Acteocina carinata (Carpenter, 1857)
- Acteocina cerealis (Gould, 1853)
- Acteocina conspicua (Preston, 1908)
- Acteocina crithodes (Melville & Standen, 1907)
- Acteocina culcitella (Gould, 1853)
- Acteocina decorata (Pilsbry, 1904)
- Acteocina decurrens (Verrill & Bush, 1900)
- Acteocina estriata (Preston, 1914)
- Acteocina eumicra (Crosse, 1865)
- Acteocina excerta (Hedley, 1903)
- Acteocina exilis (Dunker, 1860)
- Acteocina eximia (Baird, 1863)
- Acteocina fusiformis (A. Adams, 1854)
- Acteocina gordonis (Yokoyama, 1927)
- Acteocina gracilis (A. Adams, 1850)
- Acteocina hadfieldi (Melvill & Standen, 1896)
- Acteocina harpa (Dall, 1871)
- Acteocina inconspicua (H. Adams, 1872)
- Acteocina inculta (Gould & Carpenter, 1857)
- Acteocina infrequens (C. B. Adams, 1852)
- Acteocina interrogens (Serge Gofas, Ángel A. Luque, Joan Daniel Oliver, José Templado & Alberto Serra, 2021)
- Acteocina involuta (G. Nevill & H. Nevill, 1871)
- Acteocina isselii (Pilsbry, 1893)
- Acteocina kesenensis (Nomura & Hatai, 1935)
- Acteocina knockeri (E. A. Smith, 1871)
- Acteocina kristenseni (De Jong & Coomans, 1988)
- † Acteocina lajonkaireana (Basterot, 1825)
- Acteocina lata (Valdés, 2008)
- Acteocina lepta (Woodring, 1928)
- Acteocina liratispira (E. A. Smith, 1872)
- Acteocina mucronata (Philippi, 1849)
- Acteocina nanshaensis (Lin, 1991)
- Acteocina nitens (Thiele, 1925)
- Acteocina oldroydi (Dall, 1925)
- Acteocina olivaeformis (Issel, 1869)
- Acteocina orientalis (Lin, 1983)
- Acteocina parviplica (Dall, 1894)
- Acteocina perplicata (Dall, 1889)
- Acteocina protracta (Dautzenberg, 1889)
- Acteocina recta (d'Orbigny, 1841)
- Acteocina sandwicensis (Pease, 1860)
- Acteocina simplex (A. Adams, 1850)
- Acteocina singaporensis (Pilsbry, 1893)
- Acteocina smirna (Dall, 1919)
- Acteocina smithi (Bartsch, 1915)
- Acteocina tohokuensis (Nomura, 1939)
- Acteocina townsendi (Melvill, 1898)
- Acteocina truncatoides (Nomura, 1939)

Species brought into synonymy

- Acteocina agulhasensis (Thiele, 1925): synonym of Cylichnella agulhasensis (Thiele, 1925)
- Acteocina angustior (Baker & Hanna, 1927): synonym of Acteocina infrequens (C. B. Adams, 1852)
- Acteocina bidentata (d'Orbigny, 1841): synonym of Cylichnella bidentata (d'Orbigny, 1841)
- Acteocina biplex (A. Adams, 1850): synonym of Truncacteocina biplex (A. Adams, 1850)
- Acteocina chowanensis Richards, 1947: synonym of Acteocina canaliculata (Say, 1826)
- Acteocina coarctata (A. Adams, 1850): synonym of Truncacteocina coarctata (A. Adams, 1850)
- Acteocina hawaiensis (Pilsbry, 1921): synonym of Truncacteocina hawaiensis (Pilsbry, 1921)
- Acteocina intermedia (Willett, 1928): synonym of Acteocina eximia (Baird, 1863)
- Acteocina magdalenensis (Dall, 1919): synonym of Acteocina infrequens (C. B. Adams, 1852)
- Acteocina matusimana (Nomura, 1939): synonym of Decorifer matusimanus (Nomura, 1939)
- Acteocina minuscula (Turton, 1932): synonym of Cylichnella minuscula (Turton, 1932)
- Acteocina natalensis (Barnard, 1963): synonym of Acteocina fusiformis (A. Adams, 1854)
- Acteocina oryza (Totten, 1835): synonym of Cylichnella oryza (Totten, 1835)
- Acteocina oryzaella (Habe, 1956): synonym of Truncacteocina oryzaella (Habe, 1956)
- Acteocina oyamai (Kuroda & Habe, 1954): synonym of Truncacteocina oyamai (Kuroda & Habe, 1954)
- Acteocina voluta (Quoy & Gaimard, 1833): synonym of Tornatina decorata (Pilsbry, 1904)
