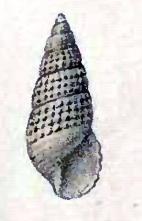
- Drawing of a shell of Boonea impressa

Scientific classification
- Kingdom: Animalia
- Phylum: Mollusca
- Class: Gastropoda
- Family: Pyramidellidae
- Genus: Boonea
- Species: B. impressa

Binomial name
- Boonea impressa (Say, 1822)

Synonyms
- Chrysallida cookei Bartsch, 1955; Chrysallida dalli Bartsch, 1955; Chrysallida gardnerae Bartsch, 1955; Chrysallida palmerae Bartsch, 1955; Chrysallida weberi Bartsch, 1955; Menestho beauforti Jacot, A.P., 1921; Menestho impressa (Say, 1822); Monoptygma impressa (Say, 1822); Odostomia beauforti Jacot, 1921; Odostomia (Boonea) impressa (Say, 1822); Odostomia impressa (Say, 1822); Turritella impressa Say, 1822 (basionym)

= Boonea impressa =

Species of gastropod

Boonea impressa, common name the impressed odostome, is a species of sea snail, a marine gastropod mollusk in the family Pyramidellidae, the pyrams and their allies. The species is one of twelve known species within the Boonea genus of gastropods.

The preferred host of this ectoparasite is the eastern oyster Crassostrea virginica.

== Description ==
The thick shell is opaque and grows to a length of 6.7 mm. The teleoconch contains seven flat whorls with a deep suture. The body whorl has 15 revolving lines, the upper ones more distant, about four lines on the next whorl, the number of lines diminishing on the upper whorls. The columellar tooth is distinct.

== Distribution ==
This species occurs in the following locations:

- Caribbean Sea
- Gulf of Mexico: Louisiana, Texas, Yucatan, Mexico
- Northwest Atlantic Ocean: Maryland, North Carolina, South Carolina, Virginia, Georgia, Florida
- the Atlantic Ocean off Brazil.
