= Boonea umboniocola =

Scientific classification
- Kingdom: Animalia
- Phylum: Mollusca
- Class: Gastropoda
- Family: Pyramidellidae
- Genus: Boonea
- Species: B. umboniocola

Binomial name
- Boonea umboniocola Hori & Okutani, 1995

Synonyms
- Odostomia desimana Nojima et al., 1980; Odostomia (Boonea) umbonicola Hori & Okutani, 1995

Species of gastropod

Boonea umboniocola is a species of sea snail, a marine gastropod mollusk in the family Pyramidellidae, the pyrams and their allies.

== Distribution ==
This marine species occurs off Japan.
