= Boonea suoana =

Scientific classification
- Kingdom: Animalia
- Phylum: Mollusca
- Class: Gastropoda
- Family: Pyramidellidae
- Genus: Boonea
- Species: B. suoana

Binomial name
- Boonea suoana Hori & Nakamura, 1999

Synonyms
- Odostomia (Boonea) suoana Hori & Nakamura, 1999

Species of gastropod

Boonea suoana is a species of sea snail, a marine gastropod mollusk in the family Pyramidellidae, the pyrams and their allies. The species is one of eleven known species within the Boonea genus of gastropods.

== Distribution ==
This marine species occurs off the coasts of Japan in the Pacific Ocean.
