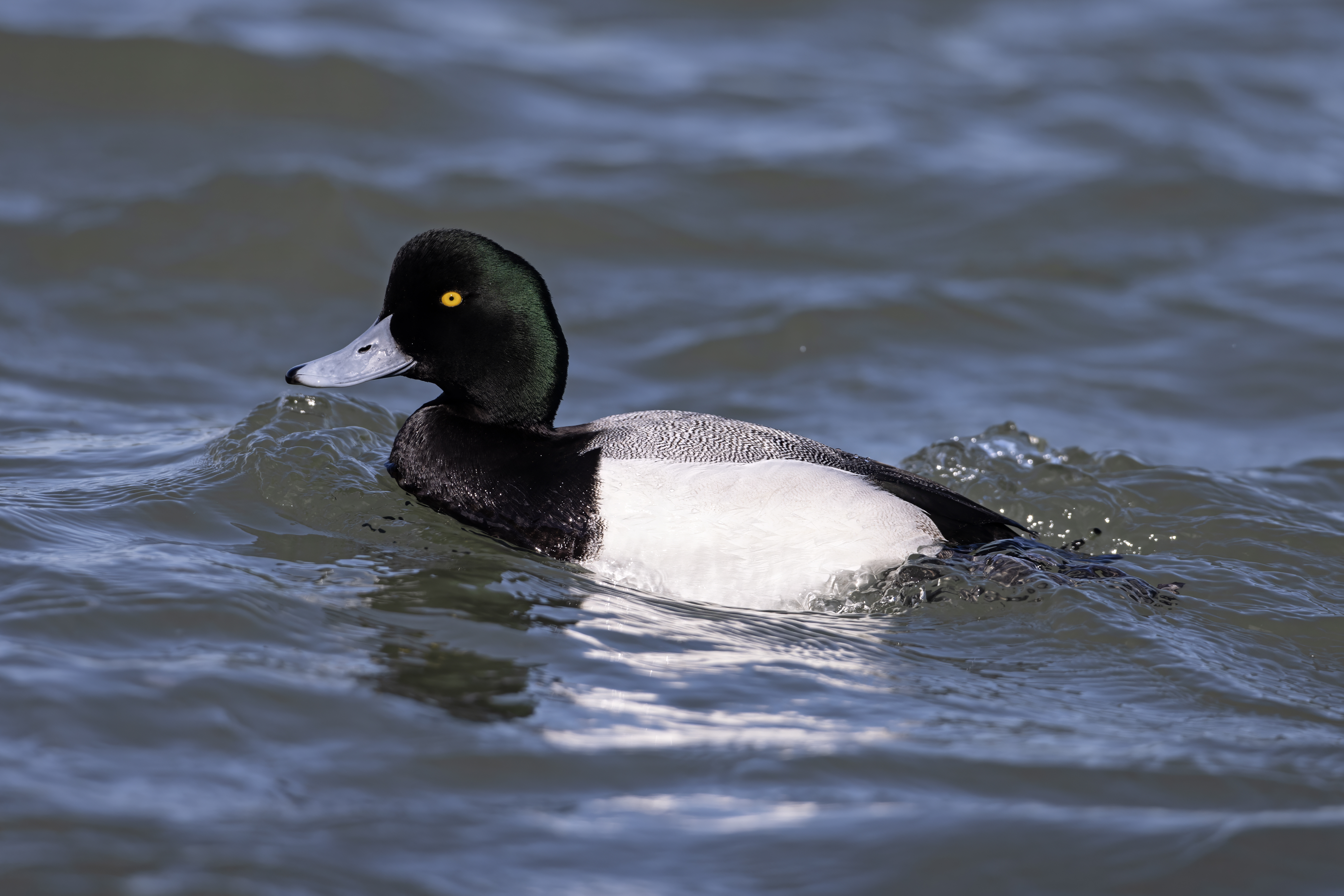
- A greater scaup in the Barnegat Inlet.
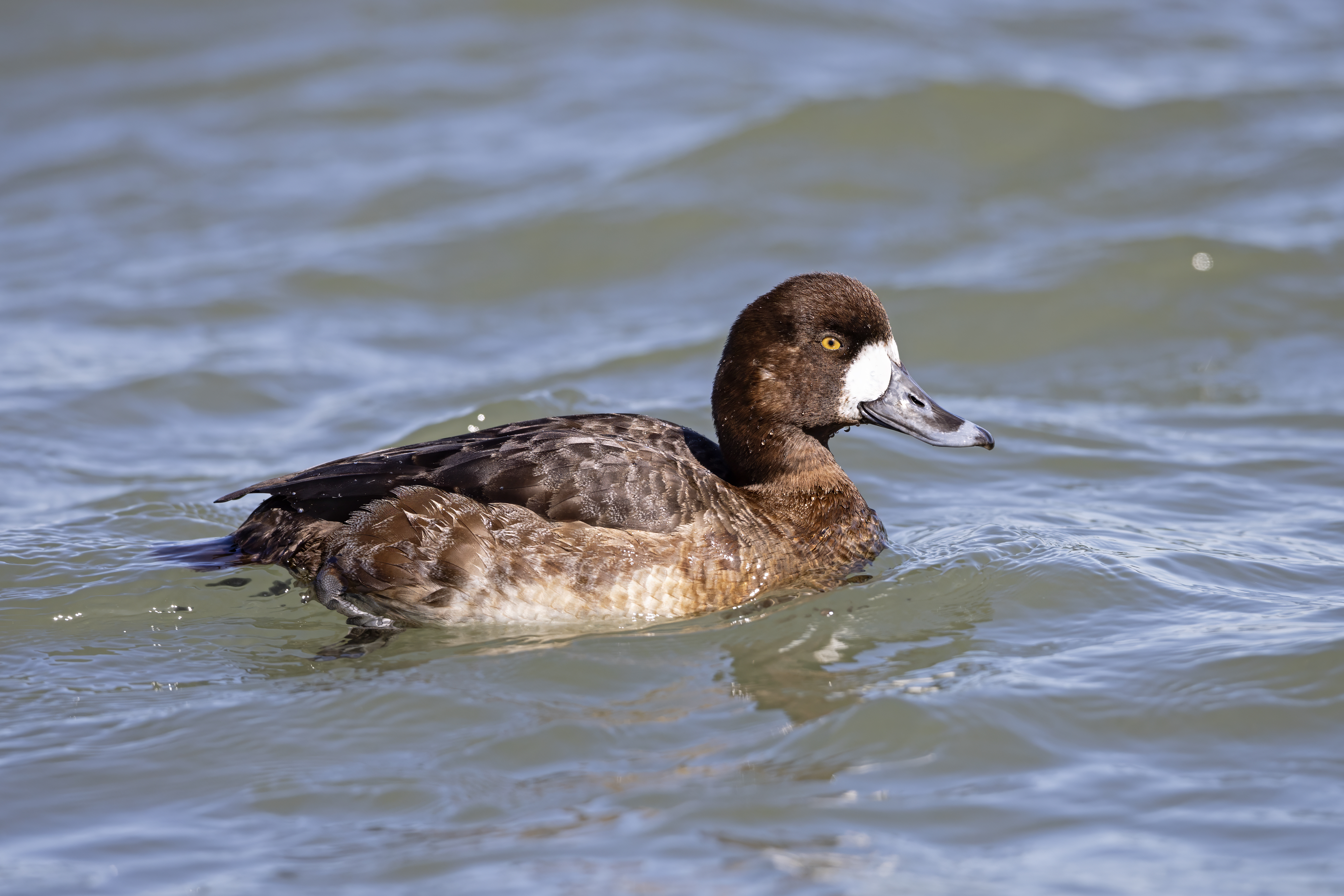
- Female, Barnegat Inlet

Conservation status
- Least Concern (IUCN 3.1)

Scientific classification
- Kingdom: Animalia
- Phylum: Chordata
- Class: Aves
- Order: Anseriformes
- Family: Anatidae
- Genus: Aythya
- Species: A. marila

Binomial name
- Aythya marila (Linnaeus, 1761)

Subspecies
- A. m. marila (Linnaeus, 1761) (Eurasian greater scaup); A. m. nearctica (Stejneger, 1885) (Nearctic greater scaup)
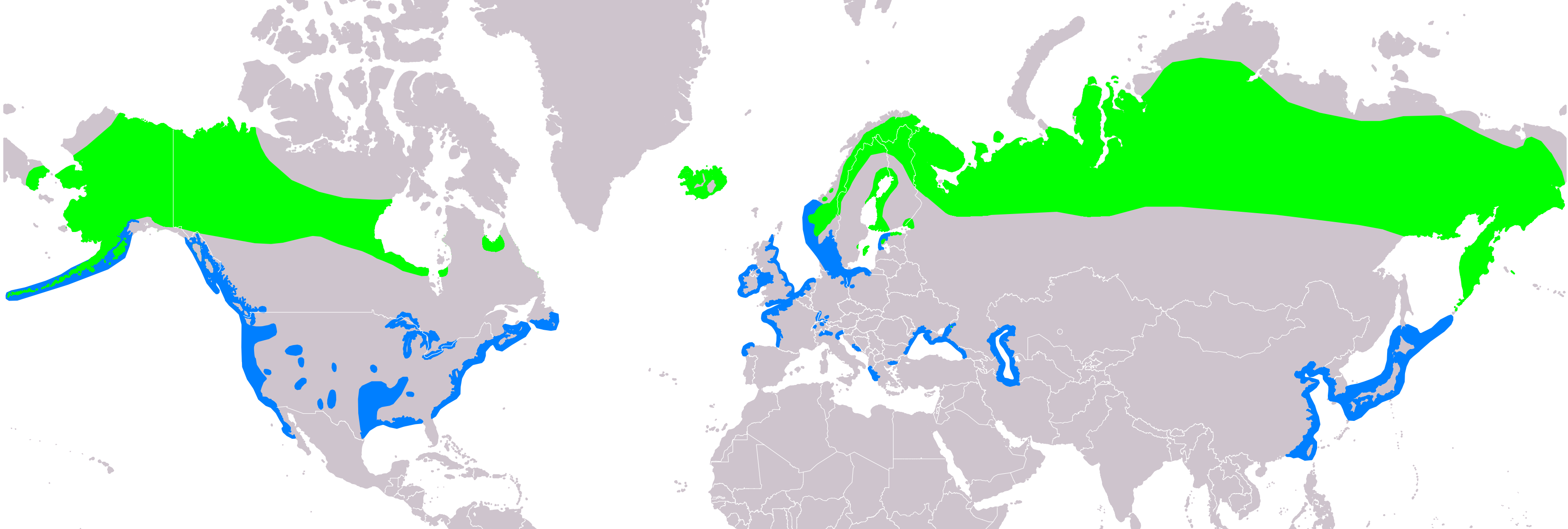
- Range of Aythya marila

Synonyms
- Anas marila Linnaeus, 1761

= Greater scaup =

Greater scaup Temporal range: Pleistocene–Recent

Species of bird

The greater scaup (Aythya marila), just scaup in Europe or, colloquially, "bluebill" in North America, is a mid-sized diving duck, larger than the closely related lesser scaup and tufted duck. It spends the summer months breeding in Iceland, east across Scandinavia, northern Russia and Siberia, Alaska, and northern Canada. During the winter, it migrates south to the coasts of Europe, eastern Asia, and North America.

Male greater scaup average slightly larger than the females but with much overlap; they have a light blue-grey bill and yellow eyes. Their heads are dark, with a green to purple (depending on light angle) gloss; the breast is black, the belly white, the upperparts pale grey, and the wing shows a strong white stripe. The females are mostly brown, again with white on the wing. They have dull blue bills and a white patch on the face.

Greater scaup nest near water, typically on islands in northern lakes or on floating mats of vegetation. They begin breeding at age two, but start building nests in the first year. The drakes have a complex courtship, which takes place on the return migration to the summer breeding grounds and concludes with the formation of monogamous pairs. Females lay a clutch of six to nine olive-buff-coloured eggs. The eggs hatch in 24 to 28 days. The down-covered ducklings are able to follow their mother in her search for food immediately after hatching.

Greater scaup eat aquatic molluscs, plants, and insects, which they obtain by diving underwater to depths of 0.5–6 m, exceptionally 10 m. They form large groups, called "rafts", that can number in the thousands. Their main threat is human development, although they are also preyed upon by owls, skunks, raccoons, foxes, coyotes, and humans. Greater scaup populations have been declining since the 1980s; however, they are still listed as a species of least concern on the IUCN Red List.

== Taxonomy ==
The greater scaup was formally described by Carl Linnaeus in 1761 under the binomial name Anas marila. The type locality is Lapland. The species is now placed in the genus Aythya that was introduced for the greater scaup by the German zoologist Friedrich Boie in 1822.

The genus name Aythya is derived from the Ancient Greek αἴθυιᾰ (aithuia) which refers to a seabird mentioned by Aristotle and others and is thought to refer to a seaduck or other seabird. The species name marila is from the Greek word for charcoal embers or coal dust.

Two subspecies of Greater scaup are currently accepted. The nominate A. m. marila is found from northern Europe to east Siberia, west of the Lena River. The birds in North America are treated as a separate subspecies A. m. nearctica, and are distinguishable from those in Eurasia by a typically higher forehead, and the male having stronger vermiculations on the mantle and scapulars. Additionally, there is less extensive white on the primary feathers than A. m. marila. Greater scaup in far eastern Asia (east of the Lena River towards the Bering Sea) are intermediate between the two subspecies and sometimes lumped with either race, or a distinct subspecies A. m. mariloides, though the latter name is invalid, as it was first used to describe the lesser scaup A. affinis. Based on size differences, a Pleistocene paleosubspecies, Aythya marila asphaltica, has also been described by Serebrovskij in 1941 from fossils recovered at Binagady, Azerbaijan. A phylogenetic analysis of the diving ducks, examining the skeletal anatomy and skin, found that the greater and lesser scaups are each other's closest relatives, with the tufted duck as the next closest relative of the pair.

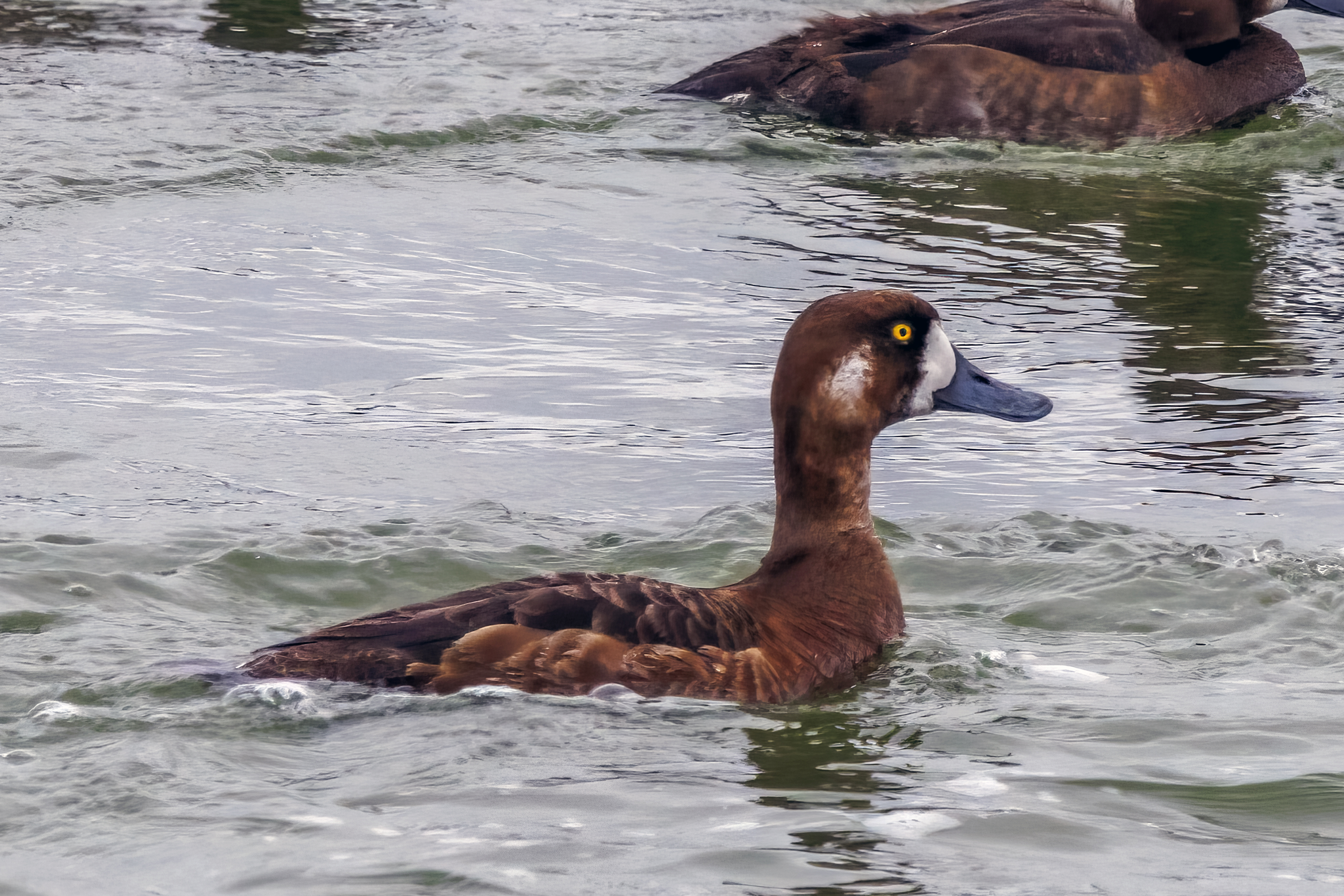
A. m. marila female, Laxá River, Northeastern Iceland

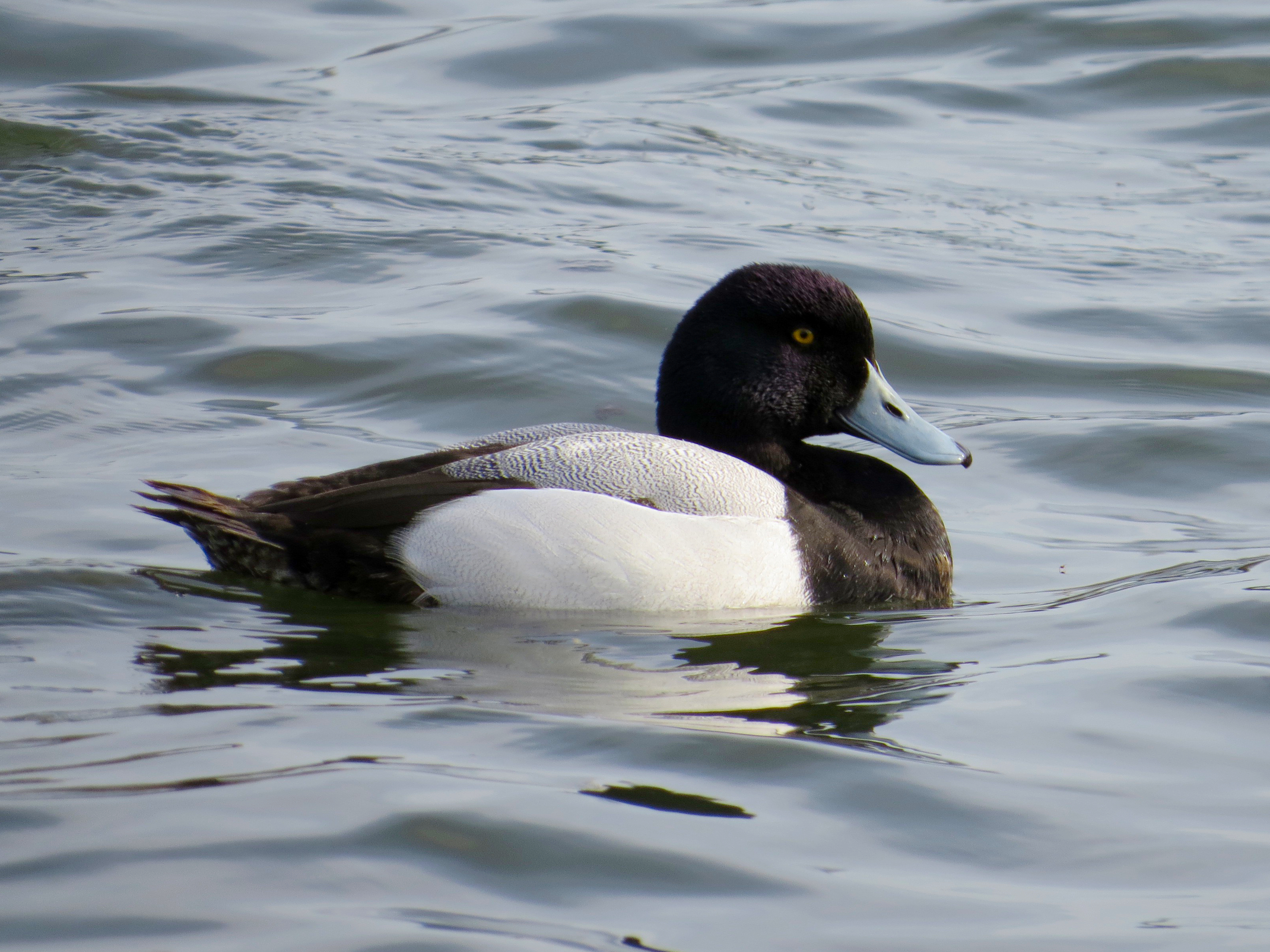
A. m. marila male, Northumberland, UK

The greater scaup's English name, first attested as 'Scaup Duck' in 1678, most likely comes from "scaup" or "scalp", a Scottish and Northern English word for a shellfish bed, where the birds typically feed in winter. but could also be from the duck's mating call: "scaup scaup".

== Description ==
The adult greater scaup is 39–56 cm (15–22 in) long with a 71–84 cm (28–33 in) wingspan and a weight of 726–1,360 g (1.601–2.998 lb). It has a light blue bill with a small black nail on the tip, yellow eyes, and is 20% heavier and 10% longer than the closely related lesser scaup. The male has a dark head with a green to purple sheen, a black breast, a light back, a black tail, and a white underside. The drake or male is larger and has a more rounded head than the female. The drake's belly and flanks are a bright white. Its neck, breast, and tail feathers are glossy black, while its lower flanks are vermiculated grey. The upper wing has a white stripe starting as the speculum and extending along the flight feathers to the wingtip. Legs and feet of both sexes are grey.

The adult female has a brown body and head, with white wing markings similar to those of the male but slightly duller. It has a white band and brown oval shaped patches at the base of the bill, which is a slightly duller shade of blue than the drake's. Juvenile greater scaup look similar to adult females. The drake's eclipse plumage looks similar to its breeding plumage, except the pale parts of the plumage are a buffy grey.

Distinguishing greater from lesser scaups can be difficult in the field. The head of the greater tends to be more rounded, and the white wing stripe is more extensive. The bill is also tends to be larger and wider, with a slightly larger black nail at the tip. The North American subspecies A. m. nearctica typically has a higher forehead and reduced white on the wings, intermediate between the European A. m. marila and Lesser Scaup.

== Distribution and habitat ==
The greater scaup has a circumpolar distribution, breeding within the Arctic Circle both in the Old World (the Palearctic) and in North America (the Nearctic). It spends the summer months in Iceland, east across Scandinavia, northern Russia and Siberia, Alaska, and northern Canada. It is mostly migratory, but small numbers are present in Iceland and the Aleutian Islands year round. The summer habitat is marshy lowland tundra and islands in fresh water lakes. In the autumn, greater scaup populations start their migration south for the winter. They winter along the Pacific and Atlantic coasts of North America, the coasts of northwest Europe, the Caspian Sea, the Black Sea, the coast of Japan, Yellow Sea and East China Sea. During the winter months, they are found in coastal bays, estuaries, and sometimes inland lakes, such as the lakes of Central Europe and the Great Lakes.

In Europe, the greater scaup breeds in Iceland, the northern coasts of the Scandinavian Peninsula, including much of the northern parts of the Baltic Sea, the higher mountains of Scandinavia and the areas close to the Arctic Sea in Russia. It has also bred sporadically in northern Scotland. These birds spend the winters in the British Isles, western Norway, the southern tip of Sweden, the coast from Brittany to Poland, including all of Denmark, the Alps, the eastern Adriatic Sea, the northern and western Black sea and the southwestern Caspian Sea.

In North America, the greater scaup summers in Newfoundland and Labrador, Ungava Bay, Hudson Bay, Lake Winnipeg, northern Yukon, northern Manitoba, and northern Saskatchewan. It winters along the coasts of North America from northern British Columbia south to the Baja Peninsula and from Nova Scotia and New Brunswick south to Florida, as well as the shores of the Great Lakes and the Gulf of Mexico.

== Behaviour ==
=== Breeding ===
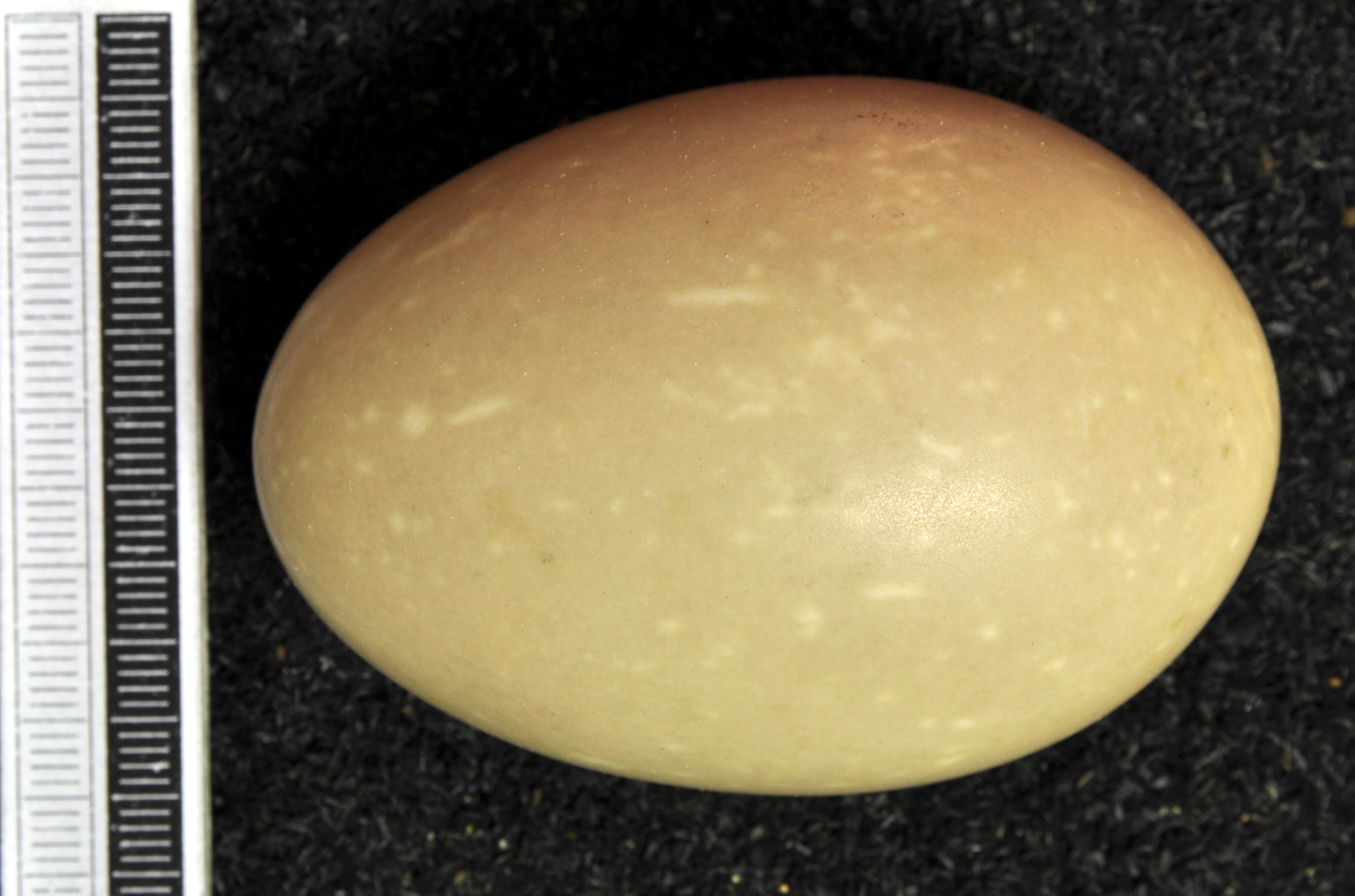
Egg, Collection Museum Wiesbaden

Greater scaup breed in the tundra and the boreal forest; it is estimated that 75% of the North American population breed in Alaska. They typically nest on islands in large northern lakes. Greater scaup begin breeding when they are two years old, although they may start nesting at age one. Drake greater scaup have a soft, quick whistle they use to attract the attention of hens during courtship, which takes place from late winter to early spring, on the way back to their northern breeding grounds. Female greater scaup have a single pitch, a raspy "arrr-arrr-arrr-arrr-arrr" call note. The courtship is complex and results in the formation of monogamous pairs.

Pairs nest in close proximity to each other in large colonies, usually near water, on an island or shoreline, or on a raft of floating vegetation. The nest consists of a shallow depression made by the female and lined with her down. After the female lays the eggs, the drake abandons the female and goes with other drakes to a large, isolated lake to moult. These lakes can be close to the breeding grounds, or distant, with birds performing a moult migration of up to several hundred km, such as from northern Scandinavia to the IJsselmeer in the Netherlands. The lakes chosen are used yearly by the same ducks. The optimal moulting lake is fairly shallow and has an abundance of food sources and cover.

The female lays six to nine olive-buff-coloured eggs, which she incubates for 24–28 days. The eggs measure 6.2–6.9 cm (2.4–2.7 in) in length and 4.1–4.5 cm (1.6–1.8 in) in width. A larger clutch could indicate brood parasitism by other greater scaups or even ducks of other species. The newly hatched ducklings are covered with down and are soon able to walk, swim, and feed themselves; however, they are not able to fly until 40–45 days after hatching. The vulnerable small ducklings follow their mother, who protects them from predators.

=== Feeding ===
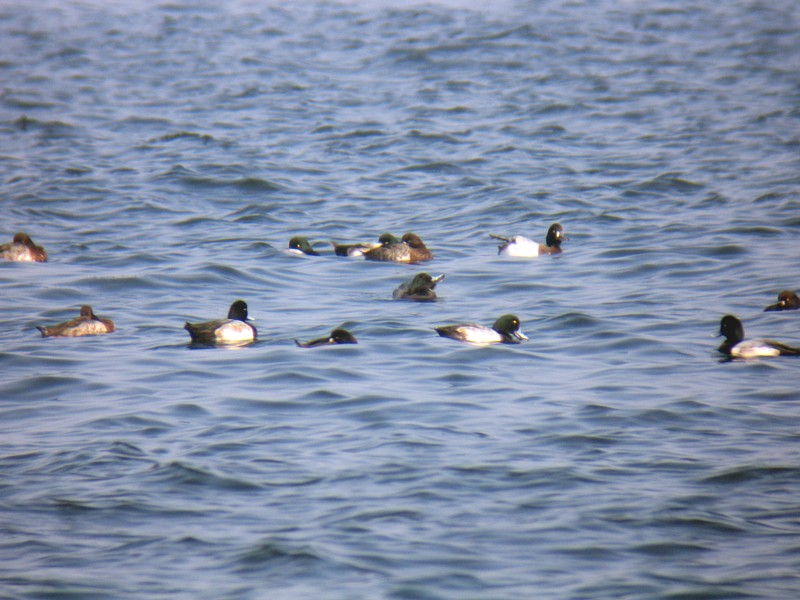
Flock feeding in Tokyo bay, Japan

The greater scaup dive to obtain food, which they eat on the surface. They mainly eat molluscs, aquatic plants, and aquatic insects. During the summer months, the greater scaup will eat small aquatic crustaceans. There is a report of four greater scaups in April near Chicago swallowing hibernating leopard frogs (a species with a body length about 5 centimetres, or 2.0 in), which they dredged out of a roadside freshwater pond. In freshwater ecosystems, the greater scaup will eat seeds, leaves, stems and roots, along with sedges, pondweeds, muskgrass, and American eelgrass. Owing to the greater scaup's webbed feet and weight, it can dive up to 6–10 metres (20–30 ft) and stay submerged for up to a minute. In the past, they also often fed in winter in huge flocks on spent grain pumped offshore from distilleries (notably in the Firth of Forth in Scotland), but with modern pollution control, this food source is no longer available.

== Threats ==
Video of greater scaup.

Common predators of the greater scaup are owls, foxes, skunks, raccoons, coyotes, and humans. Greater scaup often become entangled in fishing nets, and large numbers of them drown in this way each year. Greater scaup can catch avian influenza, so future outbreaks have the potential to threaten their populations.

Although the greater scaup faces numerous threats, the most significant challenge to their survival is habitat degradation caused by a mix of human development and runoff. Greater scaup, when moulting and during the winter, are threatened by escalated levels of organochloride contaminants. Oil and sewage pollution also threaten this duck. Since 80% of the greater scaup population winters in the urbanised part of the Atlantic Flyway, these ducks are subject to high levels of organic contaminants, along with increased levels of heavy metals in foods and habitat.

A joint group of American and Canadian scientists researching scaup migration across the Great Lakes found that 100% of female greater scaup and 77% of female lesser scaup had escalated levels of selenium in their bodies. Selenium is a semimetallic trace element that occurs naturally in some soils; minute amounts of it are necessary for animal life. However, excessive selenium can cause reproductive harm and is highly toxic. On their migration across the Great Lakes, greater scaups are at risk of ingesting selenium by eating the invasive zebra mussels, which can render the female scaup infertile. This sterilization is causing the population to decrease.

In a study of 107 scaup, they all had traces of iron, zinc, manganese, copper, lead, cadmium, cobalt and nickel in their tissue samples with varying concentrations of metals in different types of tissues. The kidneys had the highest levels of cadmium, the liver had the highest levels of copper and manganese, the liver and the stomach had the highest levels of zinc, and the lungs and liver had the highest levels of iron. There was no difference in concentrations when comparing sexes.

== Conservation ==
Greater scaup are rated as a species of least concern by the IUCN Redlist. During aerial population surveys greater and lesser scaup are counted together, because they look almost identical from the air. It was estimated that the greater scaup made up about 11% of the continental scaup population. Since the 1980s, scaup populations have been steadily decreasing. Some of the primary factors contributing to this decline are habitat loss, contaminants, changes in breeding habitat, and a lower female survival rate. The 2010 American scaup population survey was 4.2 million scaup, with the global population estimated to be 4.9 – 5.2 million mature greater scaup as of 2018. Along with the aerial population surveys, there is a ringing programme for the greater scaup. Metal leg bands are placed on them, so that if the scaup is killed by a hunter or if it is captured by another ringing group, the number on the band can be reported to biologists and wildlife organisations. These ringing programmes yield valuable data about migration patterns, harvest rates, and survival rates.

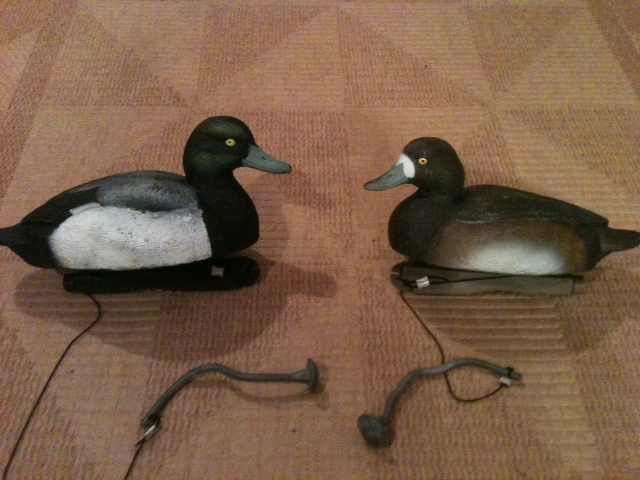
Greater scaup decoys, male on the left and female on the right. Each is attached to a lead weight.

== Human interactions ==
Greater scaup are a popular game bird in North America and Europe. They are hunted in Denmark, Germany, Greece, France, the United Kingdom, and Ireland, and in Iran for both sport and commercial reasons. Greater scaup are hunted with shotguns because they must be shot on the fly, a challenging task, as they can fly at up to 121 km/h (75 mph). Greater scaup are hunted from shorelines and in open water hunting blinds or layout boats, low-profile kayak-like boats that hunters lie inside. Hunters frequently use decoys to attract the birds, often arranged to simulate a raft of greater scaup and featuring an open area to attract the birds to land.
