= Wild celery =

Wild celery is a common name for several plants. It can refer to:

- Wild forms of Apium graveolens
- Angelica archangelica, cultivated as a vegetable and medicinal plant
- Lovage, Levisticum officinale, sometimes known as wild celery
- Trachyspermum roxburghianum, a plant used as a spice in South and Southeast Asia
- Vallisneria americana, an aquatic plant in the family Hydrocharitaceae

== See also ==
- Indian celery
