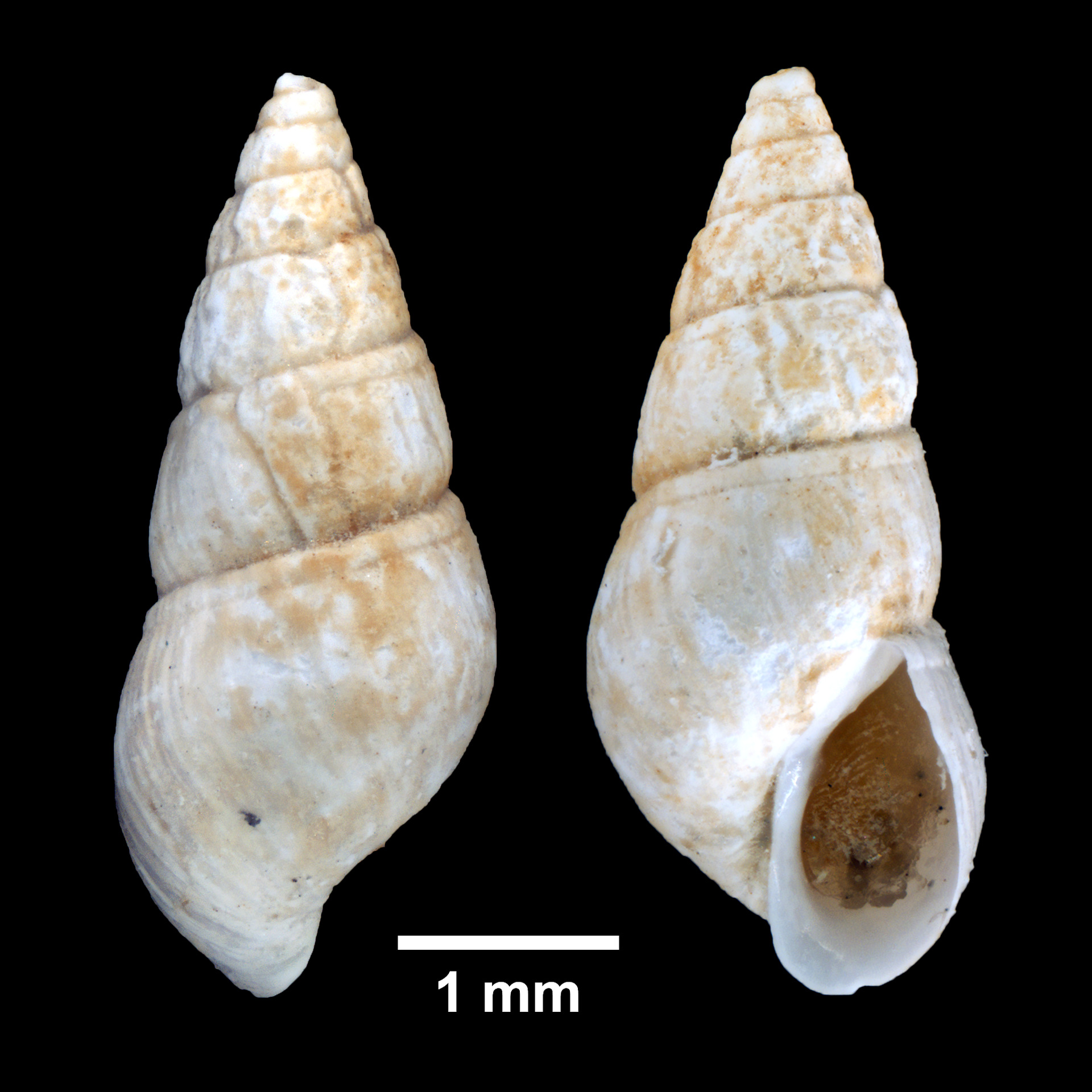
- shell of Boonea bisuturalis

Scientific classification
- Kingdom: Animalia
- Phylum: Mollusca
- Class: Gastropoda
- Family: Pyramidellidae
- Genus: Boonea
- Species: B. bisuturalis

Binomial name
- Boonea bisuturalis (Say, 1822)

Synonyms
- Odostomia (Boonea) bisuturalis (Say, T., 1822); Menestho bisuturalis (Say, 1822); Turritella bisuturalis Say, 1822; Chemnitzia bisuturalis (Say, 1822); Odostomia bisuturalis (Say, 1822); Chemnitzia trifida (Totten, 1834); Actaeon trifida (Totten, 1834); Menestho trifida (Totten, 1834); Odostomia trifida (Totten, 1834); Acteon trifidus Totten, 1834; Jaminia exigua Couthouy, 1838; Menestho insculpta (De Kay, 1843); Odostomia insculpta De Kay, 1843; Menestho bedequensis (Bartsch, 1909); Odostomia bedequensis Bartsch, 1909; Menestho ovilensis (Bartsch, 1909); Odostomia ovilensis Bartsch, 1909

= Boonea bisuturalis =

Species of gastropod

Boonea bisuturalis (also known as the three-toothed odostome or the two-groove odostome) is a species of small sea snail, a pyramidellid gastropod mollusk or micromollusk in the family Pyramidellidae, the pyrams and their allies. The species is one of eleven known species within the Boonea genus of gastropods.

This species is ectoparasitic (an external parasite) on various bivalves and other gastropods. It is notorious as a pest on oyster beds. Its preferred hosts are the common periwinkle Littorina littorea, the mud snail Tritia obsoleta and the eastern oyster Crassostrea virginica

== Description ==
The length of the shell varies between 2.8 mm and 5.8 mm. The smooth shell has a light brownish epidermis. The 5-6 whorls of the teleoconch show an impressed revolving line below the suture. The periphery is obtusely angulated.

(Described as Odostomia trifida) The ivory or off-white shell is smooth and glossy. Its length measures 6 mm. The teleoconch contains eight whorls, with about six impressed revolving lines, the one above and two next below the suture wider and more distinct, and ten or twelve very minute lines at the base of the body whorl. The fold is sharp and oblique.

== Distribution ==
This marine species occurs off Gulf of St Lawrence, Canada, and can exceed distribution throughout marine areas ranging from Canada to the state of Delaware, USA. The species is also notable within the Gulf of Maine.
