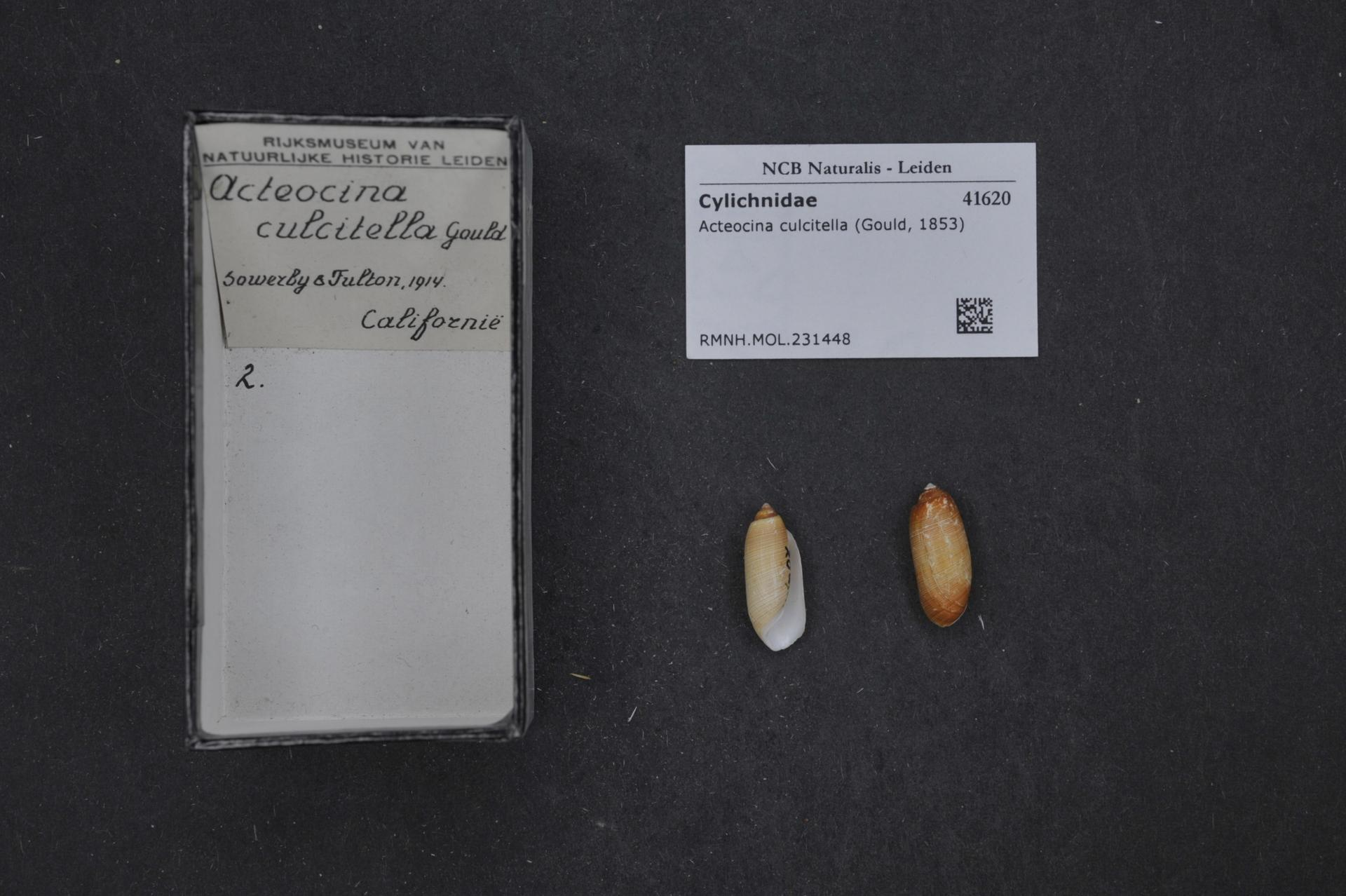
- Acteocina culcitella shells

Scientific classification
- Kingdom: Animalia
- Phylum: Mollusca
- Class: Gastropoda
- Subterclass: Tectipleura
- Order: Cephalaspidea
- Superfamily: Bulloidea
- Family: Tornatinidae; P. Fischer, 1883

Type genus
- Tornatina A. Adams, 1850

Synonyms
- Acteocinidae Dall, 1913

= Tornatinidae =

Family of gastropods

Tornatinidae is a family of very small sea snails, barrel-bubble snails, marine opisthobranch gastropod molluscs. These are headshield slugs, in the superfamily Bulloidea.

== Genera ==
Genera within the family Tornatinidae include:

- Acteocina Gray, 1847

Genera brought into synonymy:

- Actaeocina [sic]: synonym of Acteocina Gray, 1847
- Didontoglossa Annandale, 1924: synonym of Acteocina Gray, 1847
- Tornatina A. Adams, 1850: synonym of Acteocina Gray, 1847
- Utriculastra Thiele, 1925: synonym of Acteocina Gray, 1847
