= 21st Coast Artillery (United States) =

21st Coast Artillery Regiment
- Active: 1940–1944
- Country: United States
- Branch: Army
- Type: Coast artillery
- Role: Harbor defense
- Size: Regiment
- Part of: Harbor Defenses of the Delaware
- Garrison/HQ: Fort DuPont; Fort Miles
- Mascot(s): Oozlefinch

The 21st Coast Artillery Regiment was a regiment of the United States Army Coast Artillery Corps. It was the regular army component of the Harbor Defenses of the Delaware in World War II. The 21st CA (Harbor Defense) (HD) Regiment was active from February 1940 until broken up in October 1944 as part of an Army-wide reorganization.

== Lineage 1 ==
Constituted and organized in November 1918 as the 21st Artillery (Coast Artillery Corps) (C.A.C.) at Fort Pickens, Florida, but demobilized in December 1918 before organization was completed. This was one of a number of Coast Artillery regiments mobilized to operate heavy and railway artillery on the Western Front in World War I, but the Armistice resulted in the dissolution of the 21st.

== Lineage 2 ==
Constituted in the Regular Army January 1940 as the 21st Coast Artillery (Harbor Defense) (HD). Regimental HHB activated 1 February 1940 at Fort DuPont, Delaware by reorganizing caretaker Battery E, 7th Coast Artillery as HHB, 21st Coast Artillery.

- Battery A activated at Fort DuPont 1 August 1940.
- HHB 1st Battalion and Batteries B and C activated 13 January 1941 at Fort DuPont.
- Battery G (searchlight) authorized 1 February 1940 but only 1st Platoon activated in 1942. 2nd Battalion never activated.
- Detachments of Batteries A and B ordered to Fort Miles, Delaware 15 April 1941 to establish 155 mm gun batteries. Battery C moved to Fort Saulsbury, Delaware to reactivate 12-inch guns there, but later moved to Cape May, New Jersey.
- Regiment was stationed at Fort DuPont and Fort Delaware, with detachments of Batteries A, B, and C at Fort Miles through January 1942. By 3 February 1942 elements were at Forts DuPont, Miles, Delaware, Mott, and Saulsbury, and at Cape May.
- HHB moved to Fort Miles 10 June 1942, remaining components moved from Fort DuPont to Fort Miles 25 July 1942.
- By February 1944, HHB, Batteries A and B were at Fort Miles, with a detachment at Fort Saulsbury; Battery C was at Cape May.
- On 1 October 1944 the 21st CA was reduced to a battalion. The regimental HHB was reorganized as HHB HD of the Delaware and remaining components became the 21st CA Battalion (HD) (Sep).
- 21st CA Battalion disbanded 1 April 1945 at Fort Miles.

== See also ==
- Seacoast defense in the United States
- Harbor Defense Command
