= Battery =

Battery most often refers to:

- Electric battery, a device that provides electrical power

Battery may also refer to:

== Law ==
- Battery (crime), involving unlawful physical contact
- Battery (tort), a civil wrong in common law of intentional harmful or offensive contact

== Military and naval uses ==
- Artillery battery, an organized group of artillery pieces
  - Main battery, the primary weapons of a warship
  - Secondary battery (artillery), the smaller guns on a warship
- Battery, a "ready-to-fire" position of a cartridge in a firearm action

== Arts and entertainment ==
=== Music ===
- Battery (electro-industrial band)
- Battery (hardcore punk band)
- "Battery" (song), by Metallica from the 1986 album Master of Puppets
- Drums, which have historically been grouped into ensembles called a battery
  - Drumline, the marching percussion section of a marching ensemble
  - Percussion section, of an orchestra or wind ensemble
- Battery, a software music sampler by Native Instruments

=== Other uses in arts and entertainment ===
- Battery (chess), a formation where two pieces on the same file, rank or diagonal (usually rooks and queens) attack the same square
- Battery (novel series), by Atsuko Asano
- Batterie (ballet), a term for jumps in ballet in which the legs open slightly sideways and close multiple times
- Battery Records (disambiguation), the name of several record labels
- Battery, a character from the fourth season of Battle for Dream Island, an animated web series

== Places ==
- Battery Island, Tasmania, Australia
- Battery Park (disambiguation), the name of several places
- Battery Point, Tasmania, Australia

== Other uses ==
- Electric battery, a device that provides electrical power
- Battery (baseball), the pitcher and catcher collectively
- Battery, or stamp mill, a type of mill machine that crushes material by pounding rather than grinding
- Battery (drink), a brand of energy drinks in Finland
- Battery Ventures, an investment firm

== See also ==
- The Battery (disambiguation)
- Battery Building, the Simmons Hardware Company Warehouse in Sioux City, Iowa, U.S.
- Battery cage, a confinement system for egg-laying chickens (battery hens)
