= Battery Park (disambiguation) =

Battery Park is a park located at "The Battery", the southern tip of Manhattan Island in New York, where artillery batteries once existed.

Battery Park or "The Battery" may also refer to:

== Places ==
- Battery Park (Delaware), also called "The Battery", a small park near the Delaware River in New Castle, Delaware
- Battery Park (Burlington, Vermont), an artillery site during the War of 1812, now a public park
- Battery Park, Virginia, a community
- The Battery (Charleston), South Carolina
- Battery Park, a park in Toronto, Canada

== Other uses ==
- Battery Park (TV series), a 2000 TV series

== See also ==
- Battery (disambiguation)
