= Fort Saulsbury =

United States army coastal defense

- Part of Harbor Defenses of the Delaware
- Slaughter Beach, Delaware
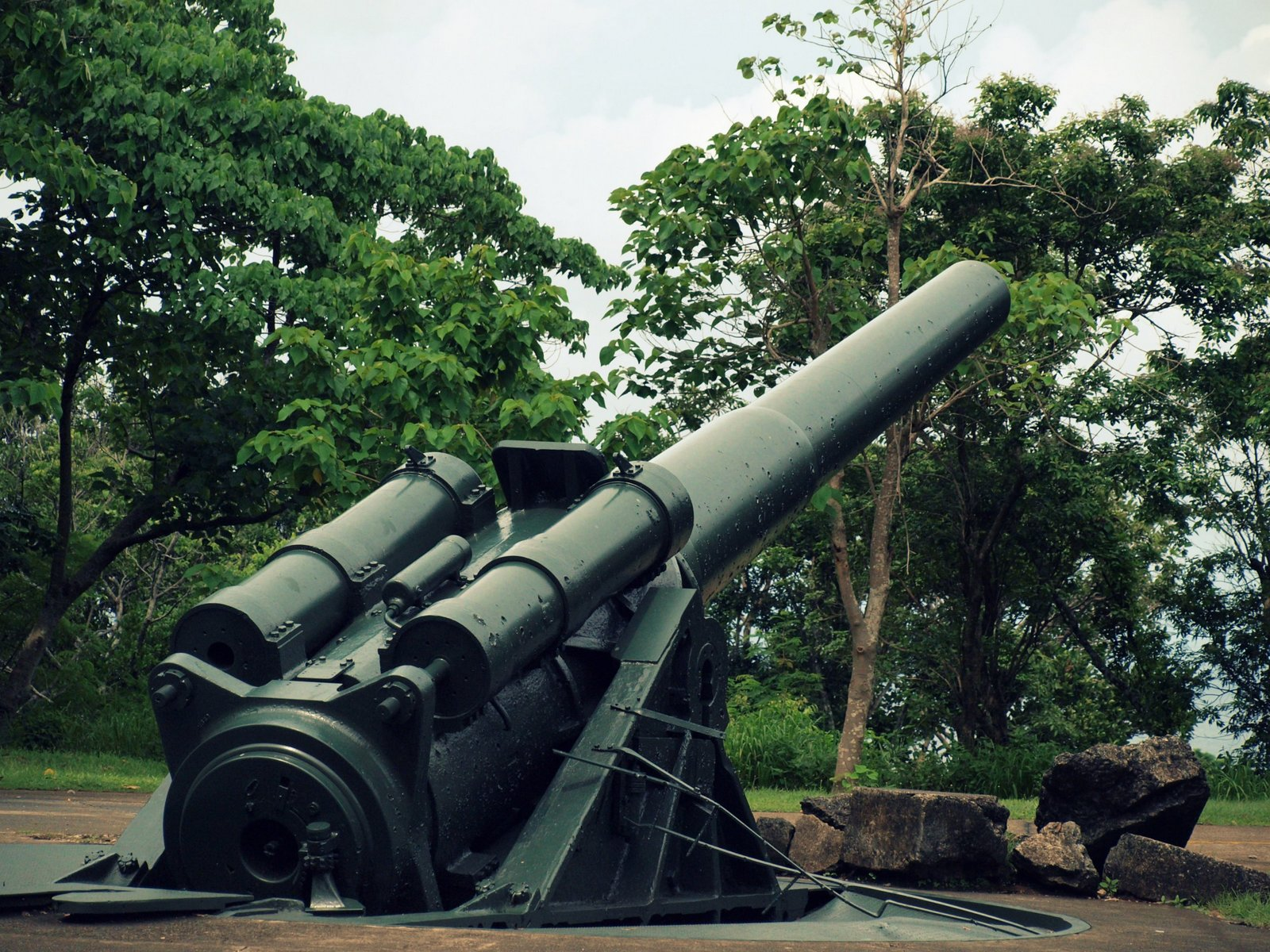
- 12-inch M1895 gun on M1917 high-angle barbette carriage at Fort Mills, Corregidor, Philippines, similar to the guns at Fort Saulsbury.

Site information
- Type: Coastal Defense and POW camp
- Owner: private
- Controlled by: private
- Open to the public: no

Location
- Coordinates: 38°56′03″N 75°19′50″W

Site history
- Built: 1924
- Built by: United States Army
- In use: 1924–1946
- Battles/wars: World War II

Fort Saulsbury was a United States Army coastal defense fort near Slaughter Beach and Milford, Delaware. From 1924 to 1943 it was the primary heavy gun defense in the Harbor Defenses of the Delaware. In 1943 it was itself superseded by the longer-range 16-inch guns of Fort Miles at Cape Henlopen, Delaware, to which two of Fort Saulsbury's four guns were relocated. Fort Saulsbury was named for Willard Saulsbury Sr., a former US Senator from Delaware.

== History ==
The United States' massive Endicott and Taft Programs of coast defense construction were no sooner complete than they faced an increasing threat. By 1915 the new forts were almost entirely finished, but the rapid development of dreadnought battleships threatened to outclass them. One problem was that the disappearing carriages most of the heavy guns were mounted on limited their elevation to 10 or 15 degrees and hence their range. A new M1917 high-angle barbette carriage was designed with a maximum elevation of 35 degrees, increasing the range of the existing 12-inch M1895 gun from 18,400 yards (16,800 m) to 30,100 yards (27,500 m). Construction began in 1917 on 14 new two-gun batteries, ten of them on the US East Coast; two one-gun batteries in the Philippines followed within a few years. Fort Saulsbury included two of these batteries.

The Harbor Defenses of the Delaware were previously Forts Delaware, DuPont, and Mott, all near Delaware City. They were sited well north in the Delaware estuary due to the short range of their guns. The long-range guns of Fort Saulsbury allowed an enemy to be engaged much further south. Fort Saulsbury consisted of Batteries Hall and Haslet, each with two 12-inch guns and a large ammunition and fire control bunker constructed of reinforced concrete and earth. Battery Hall was named for David Hall, a Revolutionary War officer and former Governor of Delaware. Battery Haslet was named for John Haslet, also a Revolutionary War officer, killed at the Battle of Princeton. Like the initial construction of similar batteries, the guns were in the open and would have been vulnerable to air attack. Apparently the fort's position back from the coast was thought to be sufficient concealment against attack from the sea. Unusually, Fort Saulsbury had no smaller guns sited near it, probably since it had no minefield requiring rapid-fire guns to defend against minesweepers. Both batteries were completed in 1920 but apparently not accepted for service until 1924, as most references give that date for their entry into service.

The fort was in caretaker status, with a maintenance garrison of about eight men, from its completion until 1939, when eight administrative buildings were authorized. Circa 1940 five fire control towers were built to support Fort Saulsbury. These were located at South Bowers Beach, Big Stone Beach, Cedar Beach, Fowler's Beach and Broadkill Beach. Only the Big Stone Beach tower remains as of 2020. In early 1943 Battery Haslet's guns were relocated to Battery 519 at Fort Miles.

With the construction of new batteries with 16-inch guns in World War II, almost all previous heavy weapons were scrapped by the end of 1943. The long-range 12-inch batteries were, however, mostly retained in service. During World War II most of these batteries were enclosed in heavy concrete casemates for protection against air attack. Only Fort Saulsbury, Battery Kimble at Fort Travis, Texas, Battery MacKenzie at Fort Sherman, Panama Canal Zone, and Batteries Smith and Hearn in the Philippines were not casemated. Thus Fort Saulsbury is the best-preserved battery of its type in its original state.

Also in World War II, Fort Saulsbury served as a prisoner-of-war camp for German and Italian prisoners.

In 1946, with the war over, Fort Saulsbury's guns were scrapped along with almost all other US coast artillery weapons. The fort was sold in 1948 to a private owner.

== Present ==
Fort Saulsbury is privately owned with no public access. The batteries are in a good state of preservation as shown by photos. The fire control tower at Big Stone Beach remains.

== See also ==
- Seacoast defense in the United States
- United States Army Coast Artillery Corps
- Harbor Defense Command
