= The Battery =

The Battery refers to:

== Places ==
- The Battery (Charleston), South Carolina, United States
- The Battery (Manhattan) in New York City
- The Battery, St. John's, Newfoundland, Canada
- The Battery Atlanta, a development in Atlanta, Georgia, United States

== Other uses ==
- The Battery (film), 2012 American drama horror film
- Patarei Prison, or The Battery, a building complex in Tallinn, Estonia

== See also ==
- Battery (disambiguation)
