= Cedar Beach, Delaware =

Unincorporated community in Delaware, United States

- Unincorporated community
- Location within Delaware Location within the United States
- Coordinates: 38°55′58″N 75°19′1″W
- Country: United States
- State: Delaware
- County: Sussex
- Elevation: 7 ft (2.1 m)
- Time zone: UTC-5 (Eastern (EST))
  - Summer (DST): UTC-4 (EDT)
- Area code: 302
- GNIS feature ID: 213770

Cedar Beach is an unincorporated community in Sussex County, Delaware, United States. Cedar Beach is located along the Delaware Bay at the eastern end of Delaware Route 36, north of Slaughter Beach.
