= Battery Records =

Battery Records may refer to the following record labels:

- Battery Records (hip hop), started by Neil Levine under Zomba Label Group, launched mid-2008 by Sony BMG Music Entertainment
- Battery Records (dance), the dance sublabel of Jive Records, active in the mid-1990s
- Battery Records, associated with Treepeople in 1990
