= Battery Park (Delaware) =

Public park in New Castle, Delaware

Coordinates: 39.6579°N 75.5648°W

Battery Park is a public park in New Castle, Delaware bordered by West 3rd Street, Delaware Street and the Delaware River. The Separation Day celebration commemorating the political division of Delaware from Pennsylvania is held here in mid-June annually.
