= Caretaker (military) =

A military caretaker or caretaker detachment is a group of one or more personnel assigned to maintain for future use a military base, fortification, or other facility that is ungarrisoned but not abandoned. Naval reserve fleets and military aircraft in long-term storage are also maintained by caretakers. Whether the personnel are military or civilian varies by country, branch of service, and time period.

== British use ==
From 1688 through 1802 the Corps of Invalids was used for garrison and caretaking duties in the British Isles, freeing more capable troops for overseas service.

== United States use ==
During the American Revolutionary War (as the Invalid Corps) and the American Civil War, the US Army had organizations of wounded or chronically ill men for rear-area service, including caretaker duties. The Civil War organization was the Veteran Reserve Corps, originally the Invalid Corps. The Confederate States Army had a similar organization, the Southern Invalid Corps. Some smaller installations had only a single ordnance sergeant as a caretaker during that rank's existence from 1832 to 1920. Between wars many coastal fortifications would be among military facilities in caretaker status. For coast artillery forts, General Order No. 83 of 1913 specified caretaker detachment composition and duties in detail, requiring a minimum of one non-commissioned officer of coast artillery and three privates for each fort, also with an ordnance sergeant "when practicable". In late 1914 55 US coastal forts (including seven in Hawaii and Panama) were garrisoned, while 39 (including six overseas) were not; the latter were under construction or in caretaker status.

== See also ==
- 309th Aerospace Maintenance and Regeneration Group
- Naval Inactive Ship Maintenance Facility
- Property caretaker
