= Border irregularities of the United States =

Border irregularities of the United States, particularly panhandles, are shown here. Often they are a result of borders which do not conform to geological features such as changes in the course of a river that previously marked a border.

== International ==
=== Canada ===
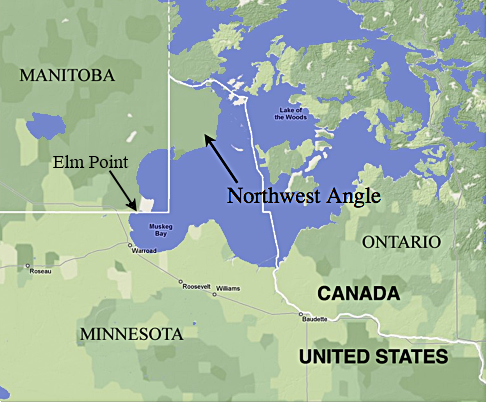
The Northwest Angle in Minnesota, bordering Manitoba, Ontario, and Lake of the Woods

There are several exclaves between the United States and Canada, including the entire state of Alaska (though the state can still be accessed by sea from the United States, except the small settlement of Hyder, which is accessible by road only from British Columbia). Other exclaves include Akwesasne, the Northwest Angle, Point Roberts, and Seaway Island.

The status of the waters around Nunez Rocks is disputed. Nunez Rocks is a low-tide elevation ("bare at half-tide") area (LTE) that is south of a line known as the "A-B" Line, which was defined in a 1903 arbitration decision on the Alaska–Canada boundary. The court specified the initial boundary point (Point "A") at the northern end of Dixon Entrance and Point "B" 72 nautical miles (83 mi; 133 km) to the east. Canada relies on the "A-B" Line as rendering nearly all of Dixon Entrance as Canadian internal waters. The U.S. does not recognize the "A-B" Line as an official boundary, instead regarding it as allocating sovereignty over the land masses within the Dixon Entrance, with Canada's land south of the line. The U.S. regards the waters as subject to international marine law, and in 1977 it defined an equidistant territorial sea throughout Dixon Entrance. This territory, which surrounds Nunez Rocks, extends south of the "A-B" line for the most part. The United States has not ratified the Law of the Sea Treaty, although it adheres to most of its principles as customary international law. Under the treaty, LTEs may be used as basepoints for a territorial sea, and the U.S. uses Nunez Rocks as a basepoint. As a non-signatory, however, there is nothing preventing the U.S. from claiming areas beyond the scope of the Law of the Sea Treaty. As such, for about half of each day, above-water territory that is Canadian is surrounded by sea territory that the U.S. has declared to be American.

Another disputed area is the Grey Zone, including Machias Seal Island, in the Gulf of Maine.

The Aroostook Valley Country Club is a golf course which straddles the Canada–US border, between the U.S. state of Maine and the Canadian province of New Brunswick. The club, located near Perth-Andover, New Brunswick and Fort Fairfield, Maine, has its course (except part of the tee area for the ninth hole, and possibly part of a sand trap on the first hole) and clubhouse on the Canadian side of the border and its parking lot and pro shop on the American side.

East Richford Slide Road in the U.S. state of Vermont crosses into the Canadian province of Québec for a distance of approximately 330 feet (100 m) before returning to the United States.

The Piney Pinecreek Border Airport runway straddled the Canada–U.S. border between the U.S. state of Minnesota and the Canadian province of Manitoba before closing in 2024.

=== Mexico ===
In Texas and Mexico, shifts in the course of the lower Rio Grande have created numerous bancos. Under the Boundary Treaty of 1970 and earlier treaties, the United States and Mexico have maintained the actual course of the river as the international boundary, but both must approve proposed changes. From 1989 to 2009, there were 128 locations where the river changed course, causing land that had been on one side of the river to then occupy the opposite bank. Until the boundary is officially changed, there are 60 small exclaves of the state of Texas now lying on the southern side of the river, as well as 68 such exclaves of Mexico on the northern side of the river.

=== Russia ===
The legal status of the U.S.-Russian border is unclear. The United States Senate ratified a treaty setting the boundary with the Soviet Union in 1991. However, shortly after, the Soviet Union collapsed, and the Russian parliament never voted on the treaty.

== States and territories ==
=== Separated by water ===
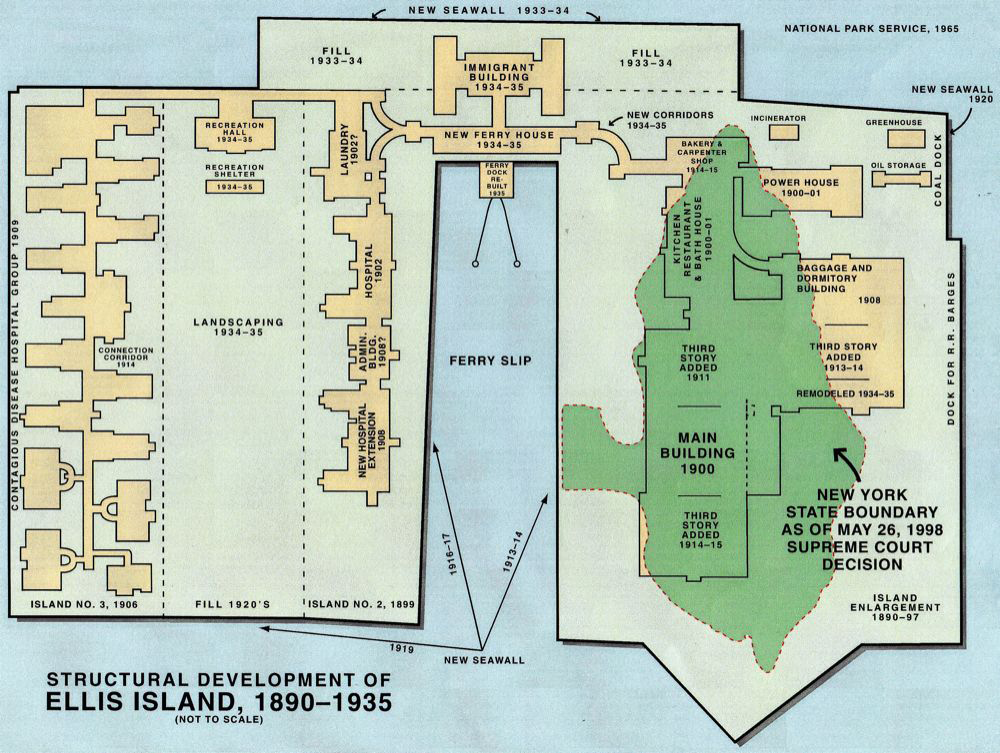
State border of Ellis Island after New Jersey v. New York, 1998. Green is the area of the original natural island, part of New York City, New York, while the man-made rest of the island is part of Jersey City, New Jersey

- Rosecrans Memorial Airport, though lying within the city limits of St. Joseph, Missouri, is inaccessible by land from Missouri due to a change in the course of the Missouri River following the Great Flood of 1951. It is accessible only by crossing the river, then turning north through Elwood, Kansas.
- Delaware has two exclaves of land on the New Jersey side of the Delaware Bay northwest of Fort Mott State Park and Killcohook National Wildlife Refuge: Finns Point and Artificial Island, Delaware near the Salem Nuclear Power Plant in Salem County, New Jersey. At that point, the border runs along New Jersey's mean low-tide mark. Thus when the spoils from the navigational dredging of the bay were dumped alongside Fort Mott and the Salem plant excavations nearby, both sites became part of New Castle County, Delaware.
- Iowa's city of Carter Lake on the Nebraska side of the Missouri River, since 1877 when a flood redirected the Missouri River and formed an oxbow lake and a section of Iowa trapped on the other side of the river. In particular, people driving between Omaha and Eppley Airport pass "Welcome to Iowa" signs in both directions.
- Several small areas of western Kentucky lie north of the Ohio River on what is otherwise the Indiana side, including one area south of Evansville, Indiana that accommodates a horse racing track.
- Several portions of Nebraska lie east of the Missouri River, mainly due to flooding and changes in the river's path:
  - DeSoto National Wildlife Refuge near Blair, which borders Iowa. A portion of Iowa is also on the Nebraska side in the same area.
  - McKissick Island near Peru, which borders Missouri.
  - A section of land that borders Iowa, Sloan.
  - Onawa Materials Yard Wildlife Area and Middle Decatur Bend State Wildlife Management Area near Onawa, Iowa.
- The mainland portion of Newport County, Rhode Island is separated from the rest of the state by the delta of the Taunton River. The only land connection is through Massachusetts, but it is possible to access these communities by bridge without leaving Rhode Island.
- The Eastern Shore of Virginia is separated by the Chesapeake Bay from the rest of the state.
- Michigan's Lost Peninsula Marina and neighboring Erie Township north of Toledo and Washington Township, Lucas County, Ohio; resulting from Toledo War border realignment.
- The above-water portion of Liberty Island is part of the State of New York, but being located in New York Bay, is entirely surrounded by the waters of New Jersey. Ellis Island is also in the waters of New Jersey, but the naturally formed part of the island belongs to New York, while the artificial infill portion surrounding it belongs to New Jersey. The original land area of Ellis Island is a true exclave of the State of New York.
- Divided coastal islands:
  - Rhode Island and Connecticut share Sandy Point Island in Little Narragansett Bay.
  - New Jersey and New York share Shooter's Island, a bird sanctuary located in the south end of Newark Bay off the north shore of Staten Island. (The small portion in New Jersey is further divided between two counties.)
  - Delaware and Maryland share Fenwick Island.
  - Maryland and Virginia share Smith Island in the Chesapeake Bay, as well as Assateague Island on the Atlantic coast.
  - Virginia and North Carolina share Knotts Island, Mon Island and Simon Island, separated from the Atlantic by an intracoastal waterway.
  - North Carolina and South Carolina share Bird Island on the Atlantic coast.
  - Florida and Alabama share Perdido Key in the Gulf of Mexico.
  - Alabama and Mississippi share South Rigolets Island in the Gulf of Mexico.
  - Alabama and Mississippi share an island between Bayou Heron and Mattie Clark Bayou on the Gulf Coast.
  - Minnesota and Wisconsin share Interstate Island State Wildlife Management Area in Saint Louis Bay between Duluth, Minnesota, and Superior, Wisconsin.
  - Michigan and Ohio share Turtle Island in Lake Erie.
  - At the mouth of the Columbia River, Oregon and Washington share Sand Island Dike and Rice Island.

==== Separated by the Mississippi River ====
These border irregularities were caused by changes in the Mississippi River during the 1812 New Madrid earthquake or other river changes:

- Over a period of about 24 hours on 7 March 1876, the Mississippi River abandoned its former channel that defined the Tennessee-Arkansas border, and established a new channel east of Tennessee's Reverie and Corona, located in Tipton County north-northwest of Memphis.

Other irregularities involving the Mississippi River:

- Arkansas has territory at 35.65°N 89.87°W across the Mississippi River on the northwest edge of Tennessee's Fort Pillow State Park, north of the Corona/Reverie, Tennessee irregularity (mentioned in the previous section).
- Illinois's Kaskaskia, Missouri's Grand Tower Island and other Illinois and Missouri territory on each other's side of the Mississippi River.
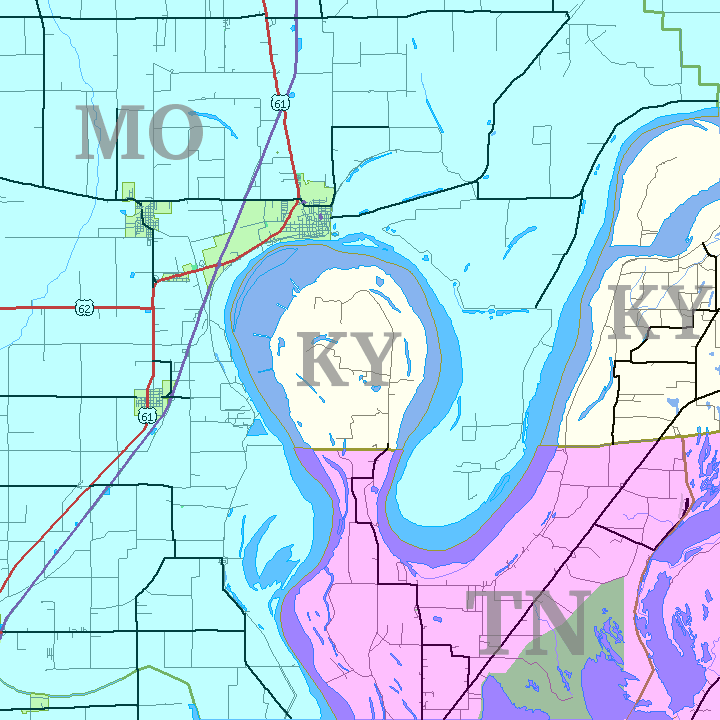
  Kentucky Bend and surrounding area Missouri (MO) Tennessee (TN) Kentucky (KY)
- The Kentucky Bend between Missouri and Tennessee. The Royal Colonial Boundary of 1665 selected an arbitrary line of latitude that, extended westward, isolated a bulb-shaped section of Kentucky from the rest of the state, accessible only through Tennessee.
- The state of Mississippi controls at least 11 exclaves on the west bank of the Mississippi River in Louisiana, while Louisiana owns 8 exclaves on Mississippi's side.
- Louisiana and Mississippi also share 3 islands, at 31.754078 degrees north, 91.376270 west; 31.885015 north, 91.228315 west; as well as Middle Ground Island, Togo Island, Davis Island at 32.13°N 91.05°W, an island at 32.371°N 90.889°W, Stack Island at 32.824°N 91.136°W, Cottonwood Island at 32.651°N 91.157°W, and an island at 32.674°N 91.147°W.
- Mississippi, Louisiana, and Arkansas share an island at their tri-point at 33.006°N 91.169°W.
- Mississippi also owns 14 exclaves on the bank in Arkansas, while Arkansas has 15 of its own on Mississippi's side.
- There are also many irregularities along the river between Arkansas/Tennessee, Missouri/Tennessee, and Missouri/Kentucky.

=== Salients ===
A salient, also known as a panhandle or bootheel, is an elongated protrusion of one jurisdiction into another.

- Alaska Panhandle
- Connecticut panhandle
- Florida Panhandle
- Idaho Panhandle
- Iowa's Lee County
- Maryland Panhandle
- Massachusetts' Southwick Jog
- Missouri Bootheel
- Nebraska Panhandle
- New Mexico Bootheel
- Oklahoma Panhandle
- Texas Panhandle
- Eastern Panhandle of West Virginia
- Northern Panhandle of West Virginia

=== Other state boundary irregularities ===
- The Delaware Wedge adjacent to Maryland and Pennsylvania
- Boston Corner, New York, transferred from Massachusetts to New York because a mountain range made it difficult for Massachusetts authorities to police it

== Local boundaries ==
- St. Martin Parish, Louisiana is non-contiguous, with Iberia Parish dividing the parish in two since its creation in 1868.
- Marble Hill remains legally part of the borough of Manhattan, even though it was separated from the island of Manhattan by construction of the Harlem Ship Canal in 1895 and then connected to the mainland and the Bronx in 1914.
- Cupsogue Beach County Park on Long Island in New York is part of the town of Brookhaven, but can only be accessed by road by going through Westhampton Beach in the town of Southampton due to the barrier island being cut in a nor'easter in 1931, creating Moriches Inlet.
