= Supawna Meadows National Wildlife Refuge =

Wildlife reserve in New Jersey, USA

- IUCN category IV (habitat/species management area)
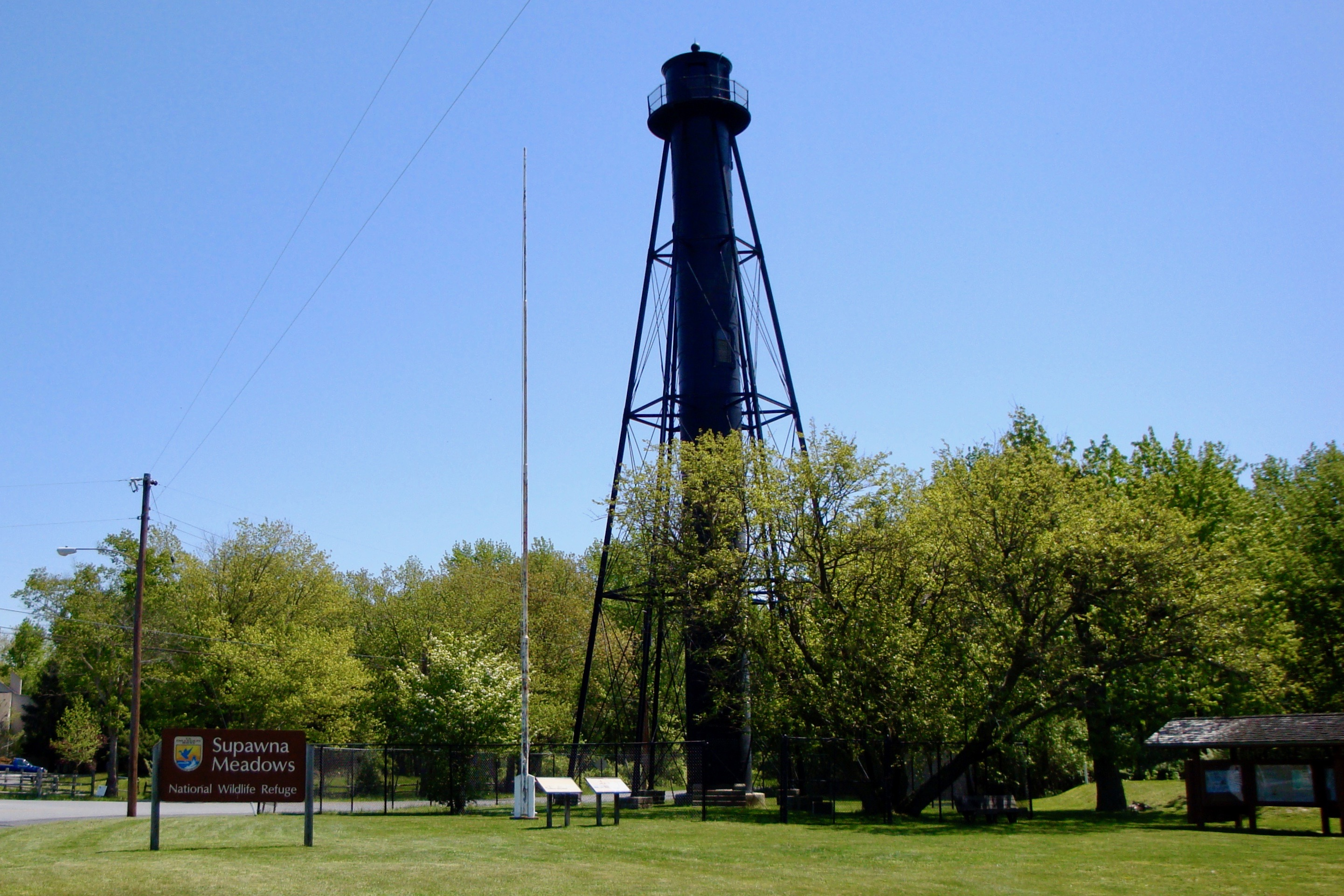
- Finn's Point Rear Range Light at the Admin Building and Visitor Contact Station for the refuge

- Location within the United States
- Location: Salem County, New Jersey, United States
- Nearest city: Pennsville, New Jersey
- Coordinates: 39°37′32″N 75°31′34″W
- Area: 3,230.55 acres (13 km^{2})
- Established: 1974
- Governing body: U.S. Fish and Wildlife Service
- Website: Supawna Meadows National Wildlife Refuge

The Supawna Meadows National Wildlife Refuge is a component of the Delaware River estuary in Salem County, New Jersey, it is just north of the Salem River and south of Pennsville.

The Delaware Bay and estuary are wetlands of international importance and an international shorebird reserve. The refuge currently owns approximately 3,000 acres (12 km^{2}) within the 4,600-acre (19 km^{2}) approved boundary. The brackish water tidal marshes and coastal forests that make up nearly 80 percent of the refuge provide waterfowl with a feeding and resting area, particularly during the fall and spring migrations. American black ducks, mallards and northern pintails are common winter visitors. Sandpipers and other shorebirds use the refuge marshes as a feeding area during the summer as well as during the spring and fall migrations.

The rookery at nearby Pea Patch Island hosts over 6,000 pairs of nine species, making it the largest rookery of colonial wading birds on the east coast north of Florida. The refuge marshes provide valuable foraging habitat for these colonial wading birds during the nesting season.

Warblers, sparrows and other migratory birds use the upland areas of the refuge as resting and feeding areas during migration and for nesting during the summer. Thousands of tree swallows forage on the refuge in the late summer. Ospreys, bald eagle, northern harrier, short-eared owl and barn owl nest on the refuge. Supawna meadows lies in the Southeastern mixed forests ecoregion.

There are stands of southern wild rice here too.

== See also ==
- The Glades (New Jersey)
- Fort Mott (New Jersey)
- Finns Point
- Penns Neck
- Cape May National Wildlife Refuge
- Edwin B. Forsythe National Wildlife Refuge
- Killcohook National Wildlife Refuge
- Philadelphia metropolitan area
- List of National Wildlife Refuges
