= Pennsville =

Pennsville may refer to:

- Pennsville Township, New Jersey
- Pennsville (CDP), New Jersey
- Pennsville, Ohio, an unincorporated community
