= Southern Shore Region =

Tourism region in New Jersey, U.S.

Coordinates: 39.4171°N 74.4955°W

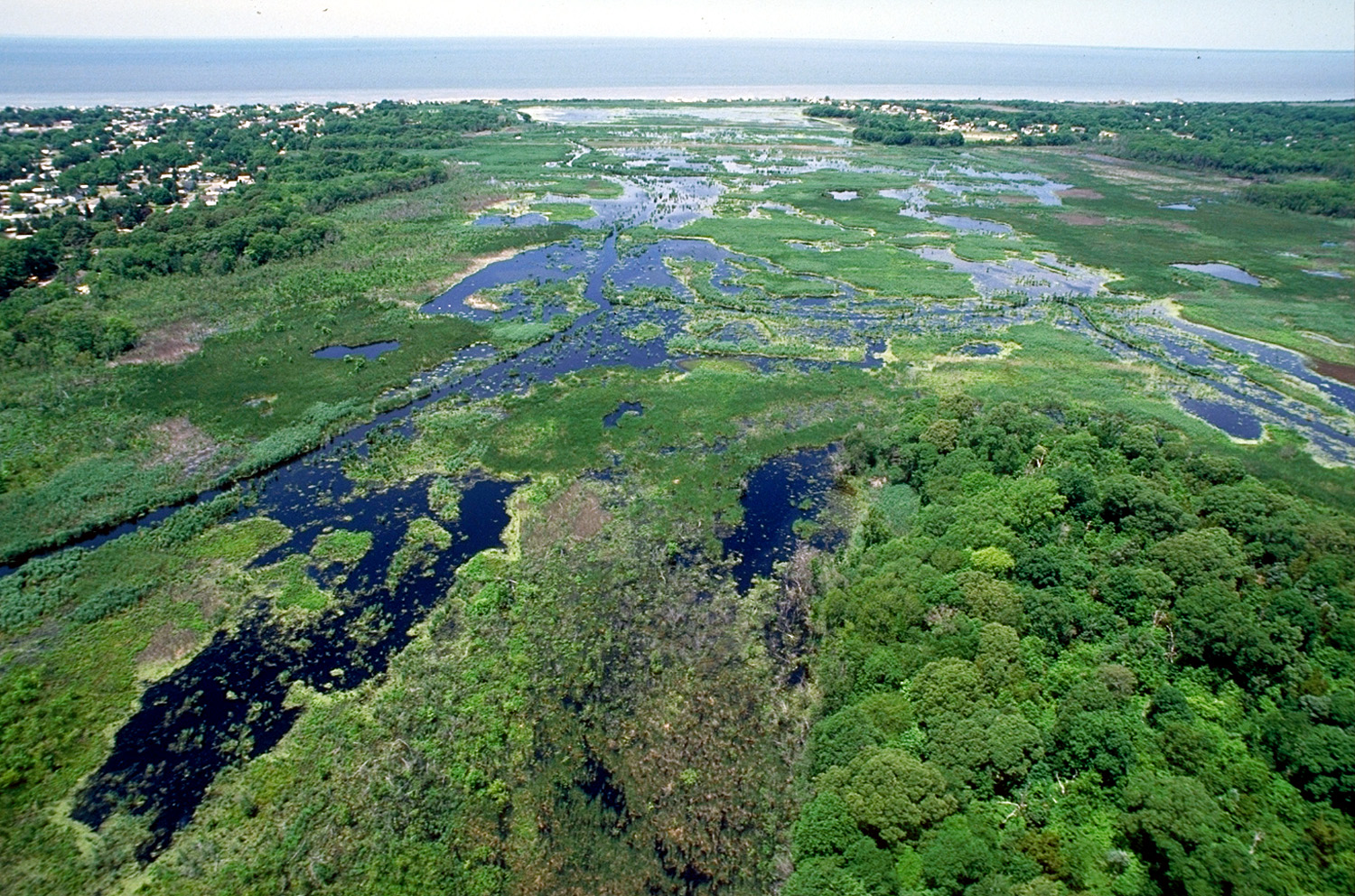
Wetlands of Cape May

The Southern Shore Region is located in the South Jersey region of New Jersey. The area includes Cape May County and Cumberland County. The coast is along the Atlantic Ocean and Delaware Bay, while the inland areas are part of the New Jersey Pine Barrens. It is one of seven tourism regions established by the New Jersey State Department of Tourism; the others are the Gateway Region, Greater Atlantic City, the Delaware River Region, the Shore Region, Central Jersey Region, and the Skylands Region.

== Places ==
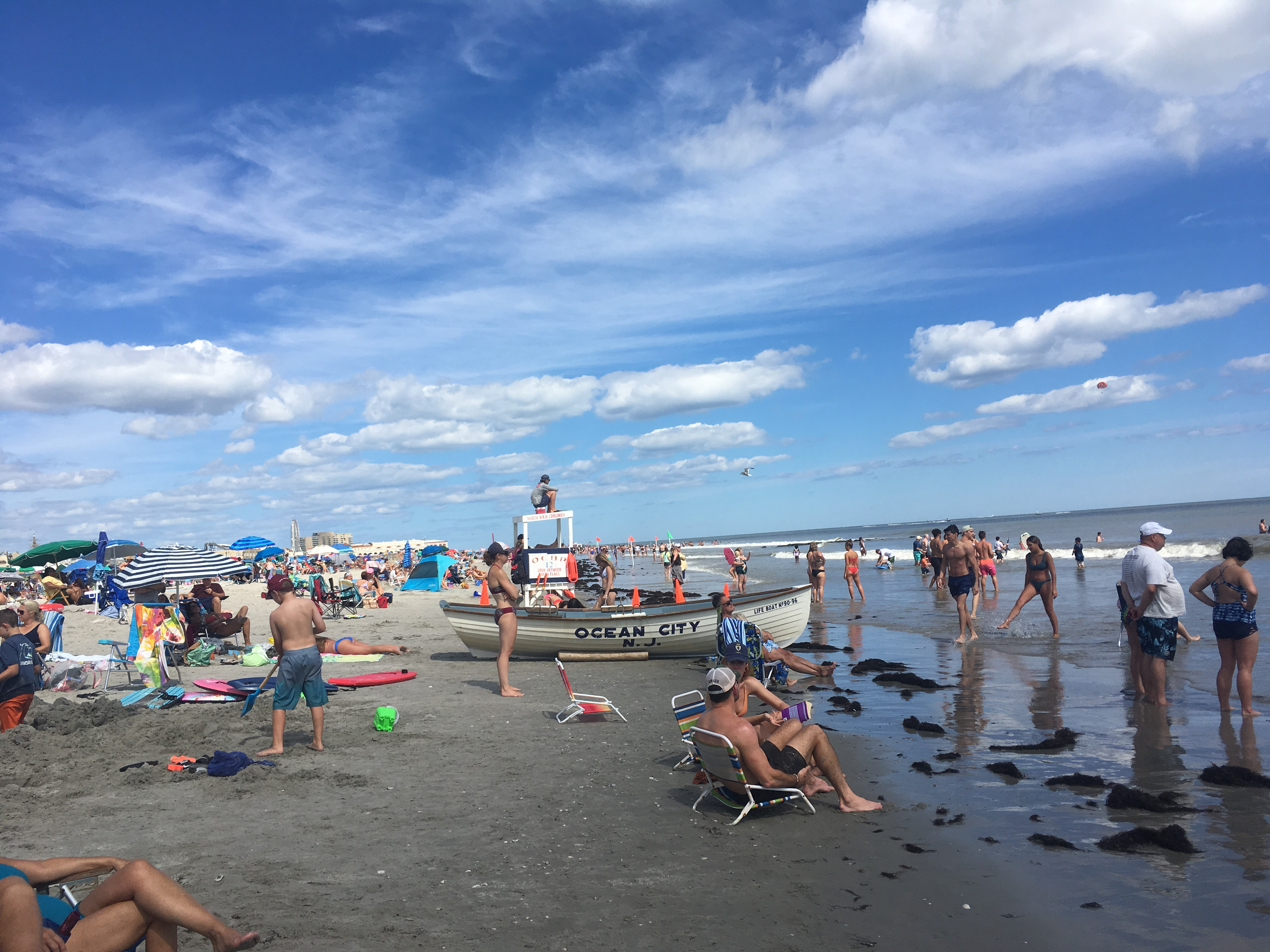
Beach in Ocean City

- Cape May
- Cape May – Lewes Ferry
- The Wildwoods
- Ocean City
- The Pine Barrens
- New Jersey Pinelands National Reserve
- The Glades (New Jersey)
- Bear Swamp, New Jersey

== Points of interest ==
- Cape May Seashore Lines
- National Register of Historic Places listings in Cumberland County, New Jersey
- National Register of Historic Places listings in Cape May County, New Jersey
- Vineland has the only remaining drive-in theater,The Delsea Drive-In, in the state of New Jersey, the state in which they were created in 1932. It is located on Route 47 (Delsea Drive) north of County Route 552.
- Corson's Inlet State Park
- The Wetlands Institute
- Higbee Beach Wildlife Management Area
- Tuckahoe Wildlife Management Area
- The Vineland Haunted house is also a tourist attraction. In the late 70s a family moved in and encountered several paranormal problems. Including a gravestone moving across a field by itself when it would take 4 or more strong people to move it.

== Events ==
- Lima Bean Festival
- Water and Wings Festival
- Southern Shore Music Festival

== See also ==
- Atlantic coastal plain
- Kechemeche
- South Jersey
- Regions of New Jersey
- Garden State Parkway
- New Jersey Coastal Heritage Trail Route
