= List of islands of Delaware =

This is a list of islands in the U.S. state of Delaware.

- Artificial Island, New Jersey — A small part of the Island is in New Castle County, Delaware
- Pea Patch Island — In the Fort Delaware State Park
- Reedy Island
- Fenwick Island (Delaware–Maryland) — Barrier island between Delaware and Maryland
