= Finn's Point Rear Range Light =

Historic place in New Jersey, United States

- U.S. National Register of Historic Places
- New Jersey Register of Historic Places
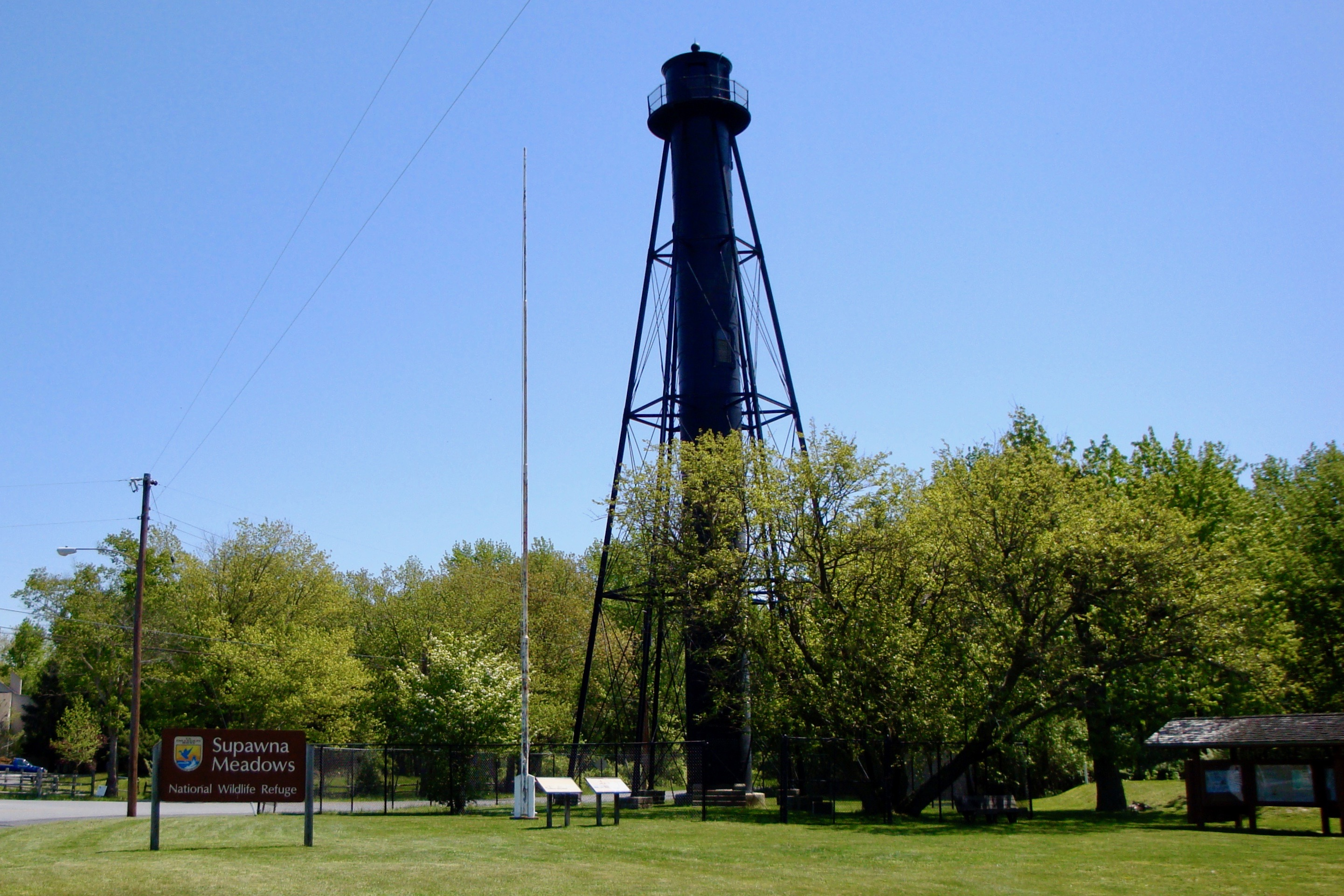
- Finn's Point Rear Range Light

- Location within Salem County, New Jersey Location within New Jersey Location within the United States
- Location: Intersection of Fort Mott and Lighthouse roads Finns Point
- Nearest city: Pennsville Township, New Jersey
- Coordinates: 39°37′1″N 75°32′5″W
- Built: 1876–1877
- Built by: Kellogg Bridge Co.
- NRHP reference No.: 78001792
- NJRHP No.: 2441

Significant dates
- Added to NRHP: August 30, 1978
- Designated NJRHP: December 19, 1977
- Finns Point Range Lighthouse
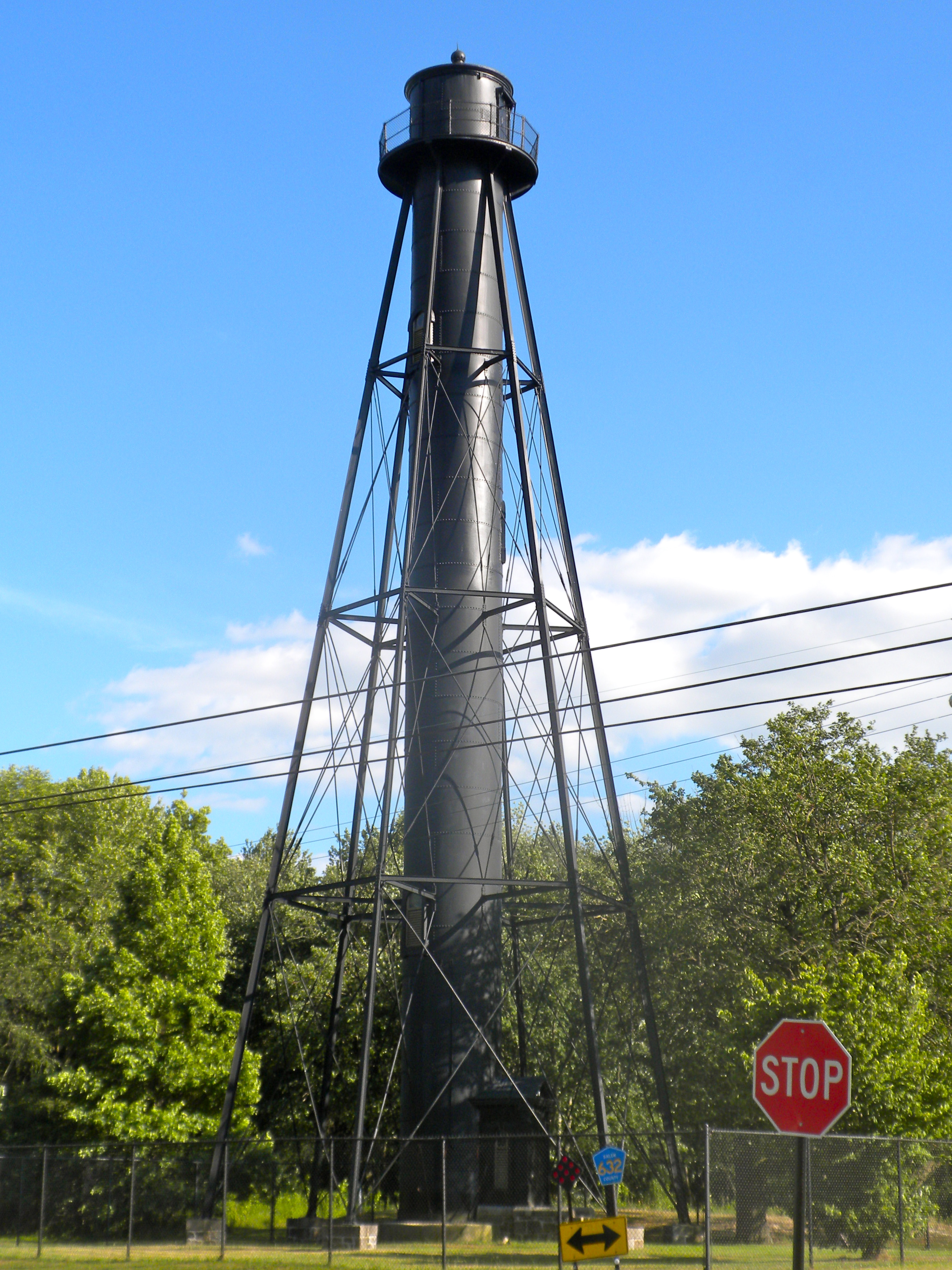
- Constructed: 1877
- Foundation: Masonry
- Construction: Wrought Iron
- Automated: 1934
- Height: 115 feet (35 m)
- Shape: Skeletal w/cylinder
- Heritage: National Register of Historic Places listed place
- First lit: 1877
- Deactivated: 1950
- Lens: Fourth Order Fresnel lens
- Characteristic: 1 Second Eclipse (Currently Not Lit)

Finn's Point Rear Range Light is located at the intersection of Fort Mott and Lighthouse roads on Finns Point in Pennsville Township of Salem County, New Jersey. The range light was added to the National Register of Historic Places on August 30, 1978, for its significance in engineering. It has been incorporated into the Supawna Meadows National Wildlife Refuge.

== History and description ==
The range light was built 1876–1877 by the Kellogg Bridge Co. of Buffalo, New York. The tower is made from wrought iron and is approximately 100 feet (30 m) high. The platform at the top is reached by a cast iron spiral staircase encased in a wrought iron cylinder. The use of wrought iron was atypical for this type of tower. It had resistance to corrosion and cracking. According to the nomination form, this tower is the only extant structure of this type in the state. The light was taken out of service c. 1950 and the lenses removed.

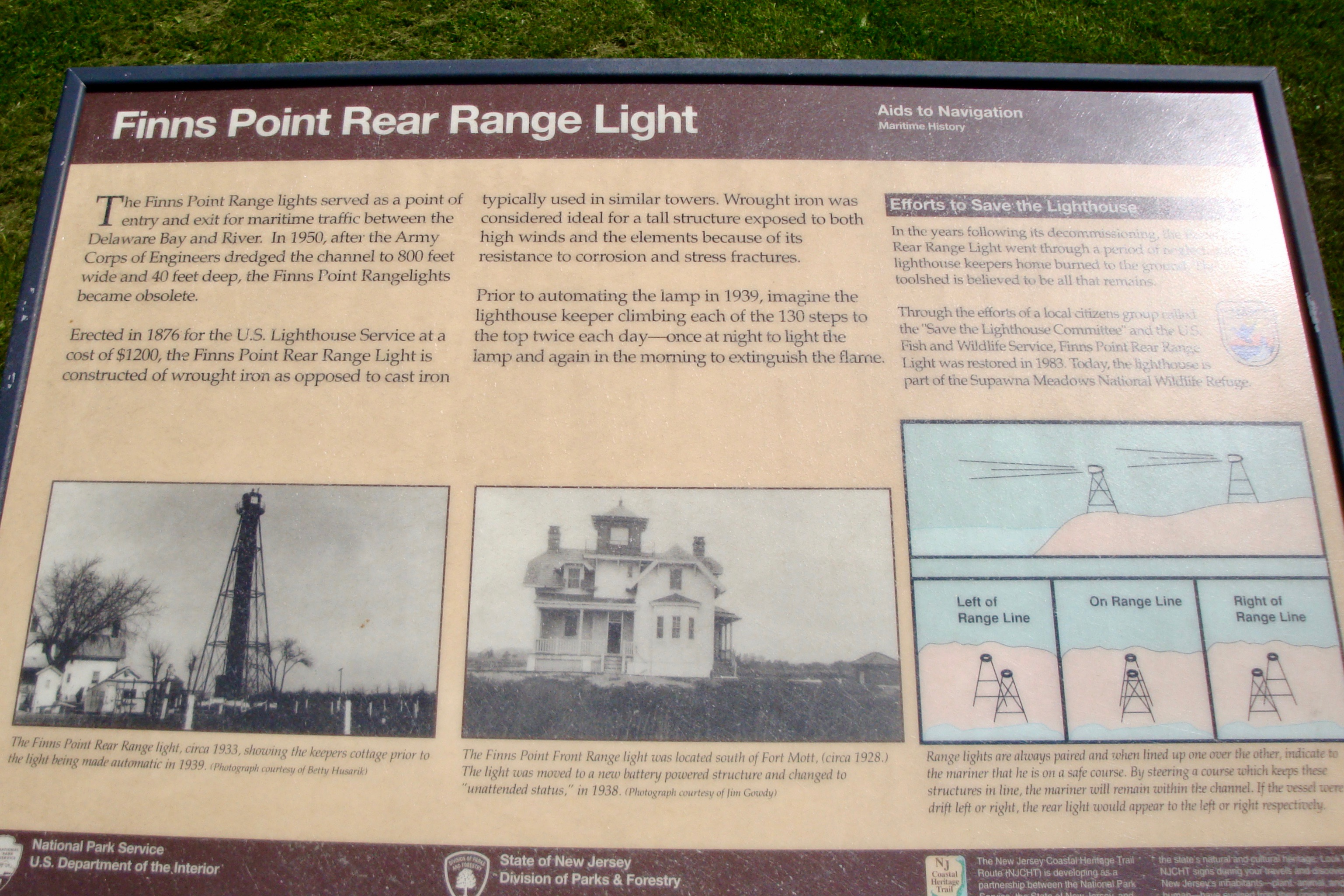
Information sign for the light

== See also ==
- National Register of Historic Places listings in Salem County, New Jersey
