= Killcohook National Wildlife Refuge =

Former protected area in Delaware, US

- Location within the United States
- Location: New Castle County, Delaware, United States
- Nearest city: Pennsville, New Jersey
- Coordinates: 39°37′03″N 75°33′48″W
- Established: February 3, 1934
- Governing body: Corps of Engineers

Killcohook National Wildlife Refuge (founded as Killcohook Migratory Bird Refuge) was a United States National Wildlife Refuge located on the east bank of the Delaware River adjacent to the current Supawna Meadows National Wildlife Refuge. It had originally been established in 1934 as a secondary dredged material disposal site for use by the Army Corps of Engineers. Its status as a refuge was revoked in 1998 by the U.S. Congress and it is currently used as a confined disposal facility by the U.S. Army Corps of Engineers.

== Geography ==
The former refuge is part of New Castle County, Delaware. As outlined by the Twelve-Mile Circle, a colonial-era agreement, Killcohook is one place in Delaware that shares a land border with New Jersey, called Finn's Point. (Artificial Island is another.) Since the border was originally defined as being along the low-water mark on the New Jersey shore of the river, the reclaimed land on which the refuge lies falls within Delaware territory.

The former wildlife refuge is north of the Fort Mott State Park and south of Pennsville, New Jersey. Across the Delaware River are Ommelanden Range near Bear, Delaware and Delaware City. Fort Delaware State Park on Pea Patch Island lies between the two shores.

== Wildlife ==
Killcohook NWR consisted primarily of marshland, with emphasis on breeding of migratory waterfowl. Species singled out for protection in Killcohook include the American black duck.

== See also ==
- List of National Wildlife Refuges
