= Cape May National Wildlife Refuge =

Wildlife habitat in New Jersey, US

- IUCN category IV (habitat/species management area)
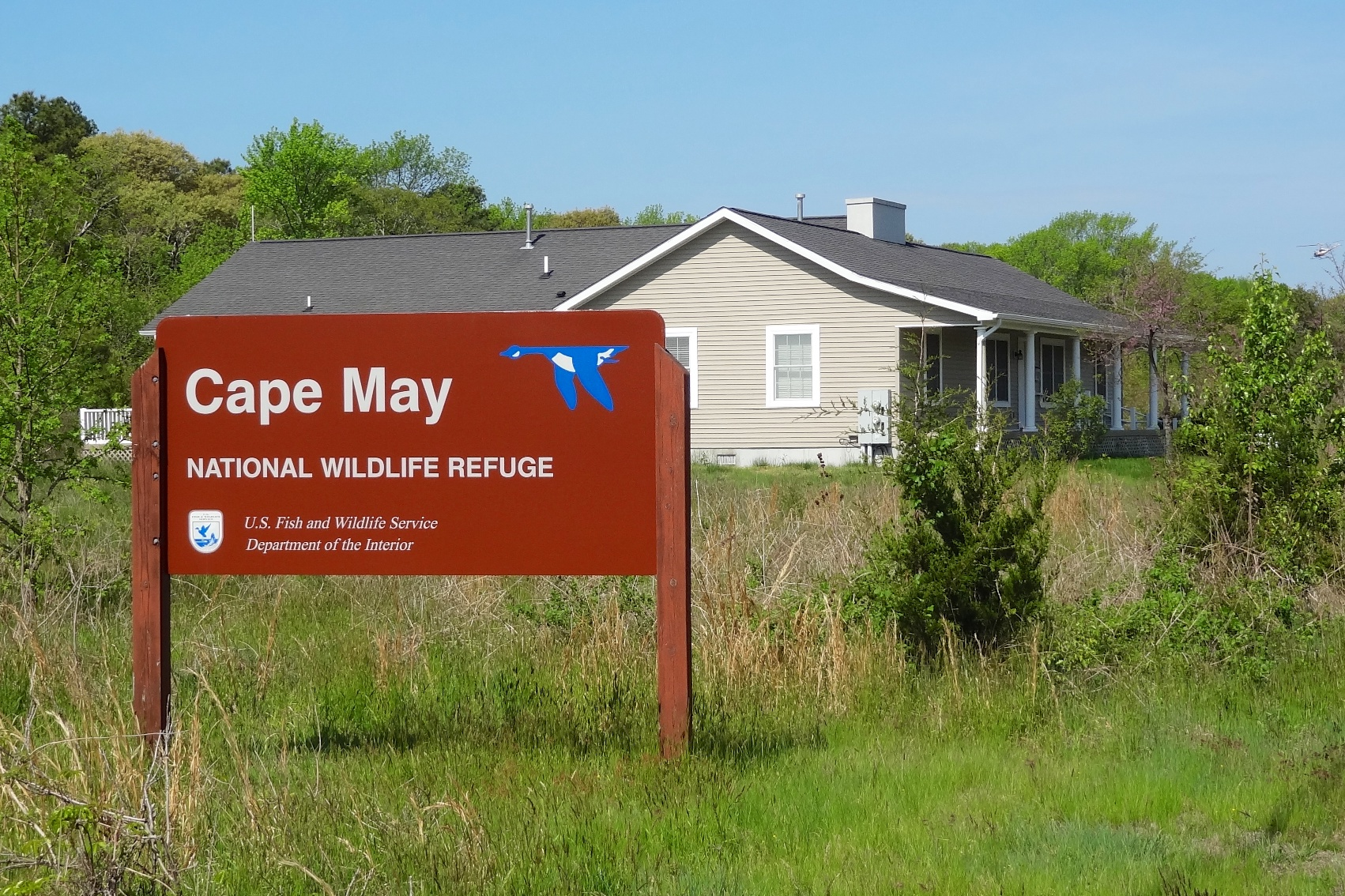

- Location within New Jersey Location within the United States
- Location: Cape May County, New Jersey
- Nearest city: South Dennis, New Jersey
- Coordinates: 39°09′30″N 74°49′30″W
- Area: 21,200 acres (86 km^{2})
- Established: 1989
- Governing body: U.S. Fish and Wildlife Service
- Website: Cape May National Wildlife Refuge

The Cape May National Wildlife Refuge is a protected area on the Cape May Peninsula in Cape May County, New Jersey. It is part of the National Wildlife Refuge System and managed by the United States Fish and Wildlife Service. Established in January 1989 with 90 acres (0.36 km^{2}) acquired from the Nature Conservancy, it has since grown to more than 11,000 acres (45 km^{2}) in size, and plans call for its further expansion to more than 21,200 acres (86 km^{2}). It comprises three distinct and non-contiguous units: the Delaware Bay Division (in Middle Township), the Great Cedar Swamp Division (in Dennis Township and Upper Township) and the Two Mile Beach Unit (in Lower Township). Located in the Middle Atlantic coastal forests ecoregion, the cape provides habitat for large numbers of migratory birds.

== Wildlife ==
Cape May National Wildlife Refuge provides critical habitat to a wide variety of migratory birds and other wildlife. It supports 317 bird species, 42 mammal species, 55 reptile and amphibian species, and numerous fish, shellfish and other invertebrates. Its value for the protection of migratory birds and their habitat will continue to grow as wildlife habitat along the Jersey Shore is developed into roads, shopping centers and housing developments. Cape May Peninsula's unique configuration and location concentrate songbirds, raptors and woodcock as they funnel south to Cape May Point during their fall migration. Faced with 12 miles (19 km) of water to cross at the Delaware Bay migrants linger in the area to rest and feed until favorable winds allow them to cross the Bay or head north along the Bay's eastern shore.

== Shorebirds ==
The refuge's five-mile stretch along the Delaware Bay is a major resting and feeding area for migrating shorebirds and wading birds each spring. The Delaware Bay shoreline has gained international recognition as a major shorebird staging area in North America second only to the Copper River Delta in Alaska. Each year hundreds of thousands of shorebirds-nearly 80 percent of some populations-stop to rest and feed here during their spring migration from Central and South America to their Arctic breeding grounds. The arrival at Cape May of more than twenty shorebird species-primarily red knots, ruddy turnstones, sanderlings and semipalmated sandpipers-coincides with the horseshoe crab spawning season which occurs in May/early June. The crab eggs provide an abundant food supply which these long-distance flyers use to replenish their energy reserves before moving on. (In May large numbers of red knots gather along Delaware Bay beaches.)

In 1992, because of its value to migrating shorebirds and wading birds, it was designated a Wetland of International Importance as part of the Delaware Bay Estuary.

== Songbirds / Neotropical migrants ==
Neotropical migrants—birds that spend their summers in Canada and the U.S. and their winters in Mexico, the Caribbean, Central America and South America—use Cape May Peninsula's varied habitats in great abundance during their long and difficult migrations. Due to loss of habitat throughout much of their range many of these species are in decline. Almost 100 neotropical songbird species stop to rest and feed along the Cape May Peninsula most often using forest habitats. Many songbird species also nest here including ovenbirds, wood thrushes and yellow-throated warblers.

== Raptors ==
Cape May Peninsula is renowned for its spectacular raptor migrations each fall. During this period great numbers of 17 raptor species are commonly seen including peregrine falcons, ospreys, northern harriers, American kestrels, Cooper's and sharp-shinned hawks. Because many raptors do not choose to cross such large bodies of water as the Delaware Bay, many use the bayshore upland forest edge as a migration corridor.

All raptor species found in southern New Jersey occur on the refuge. Some, like the red-tailed hawk, frequent the refuge all year. After a population decline in the 1970s, bald eagles once again nest on refuge land. Owl populations make extensive use of Cape May's woodland habitats in winter, and several species—such as the barred owl—also nest here.

== American woodcock ==
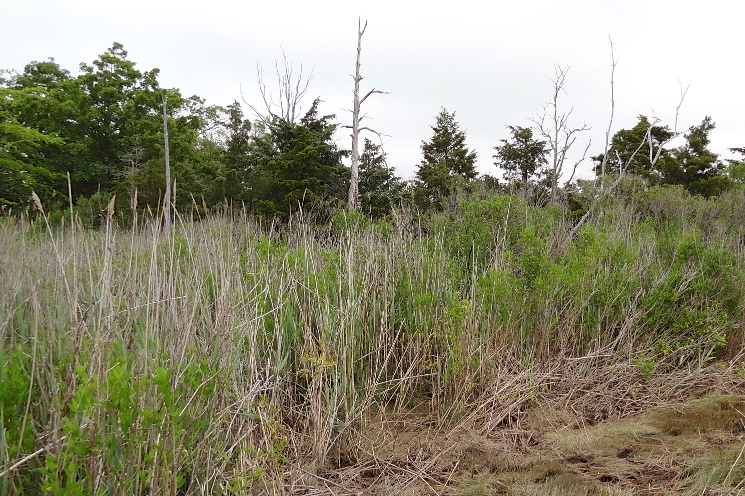
Varied habitat, forest and marsh

During fall migration these unique upland shorebirds concentrate in massive numbers in Cape May's moist woodlands and thickets. They use such habitats for foraging, replenishing their fat reserves by eating more than their weight in earthworms daily. On the East Coast of the United States, only Cape Charles, Virginia hosts comparable concentrations of woodcock. The refuge provides excellent resting and feeding habitat for this interesting species.

== Endangered and threatened species ==
The threatened piping plover uses Two Mile Beach Unit for feeding and roosting. New Jersey State-listed species confirmed within the refuge boundary include ospreys, short-eared owls, barred owls, red-shouldered hawks, grasshopper sparrows, great and little blue herons, red-headed woodpeckers, sedge wrens, yellow-crowned night-herons, northern harriers, black rails, southern gray tree frogs, eastern tiger and mud salamanders, corn snakes and northern pine snakes.

Swamp pink—a unique lily family member which is on the Federal List of Endangered and Threatened Plants and Animals—also occurs on the refuge, as do 34 state-listed plant species.

== Fishery resources ==
Cape May National Wildlife Refuge's marshes and tidal creeks provide important nursery areas and nutrient resources for many popular species of finfish and shellfish including summer flounder, weakfish, striped bass, blue crabs and lady crabs. These fisheries provide abundant resources for wildlife as well as for people. Seventy percent of the species sought by recreational and commercial fishermen depend on shallow water habitats such as those found on the refuge for at least part of their life cycle.

== See also ==
- Supawna Meadows National Wildlife Refuge
- Edwin B. Forsythe National Wildlife Refuge
- Killcohook National Wildlife Refuge
- The Glades (New Jersey)
