= Finns Point =

Promontory on the Delaware River, United States

- Promonotory
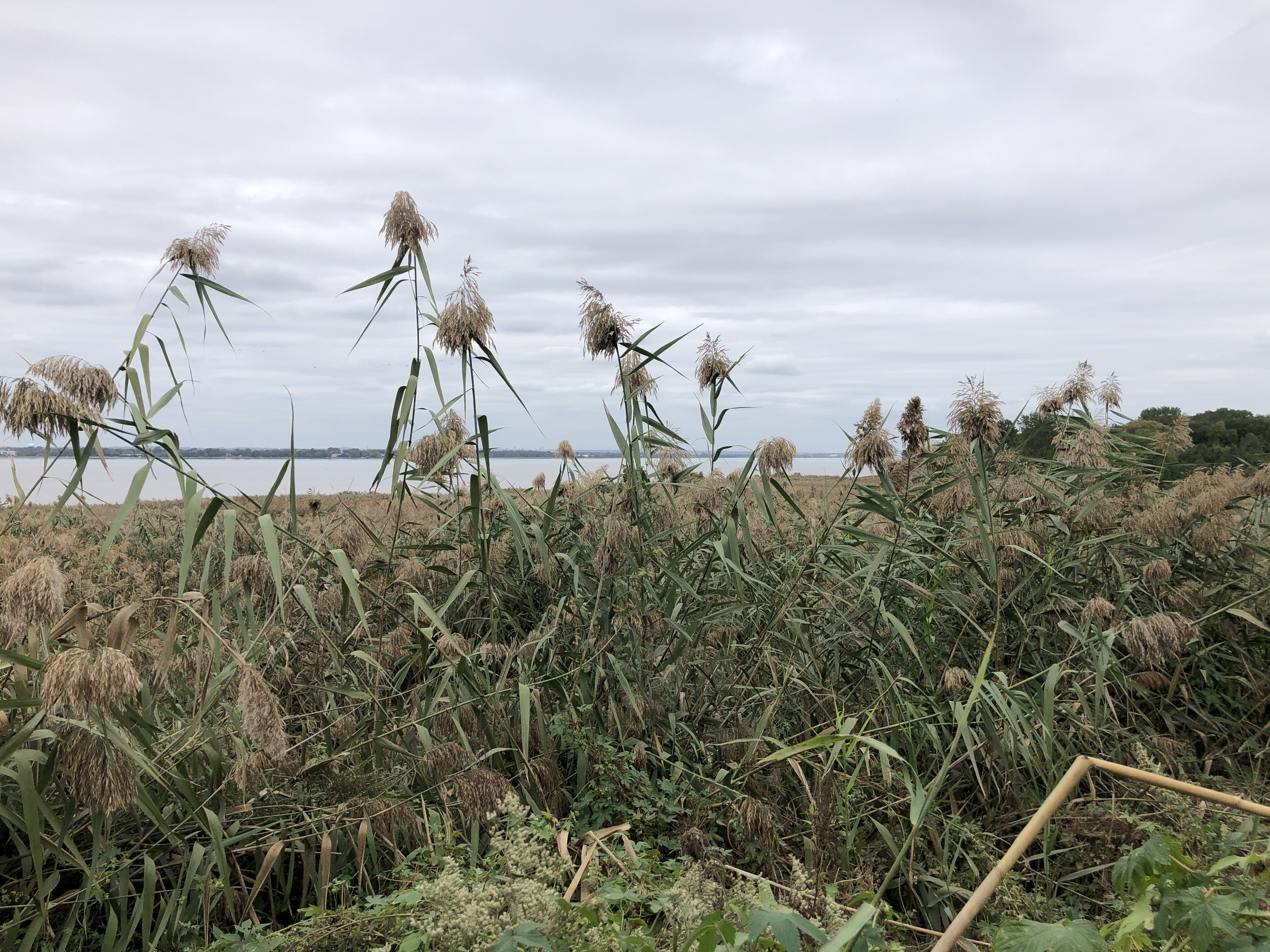
- View north along the land border of New Jersey and Delaware on Finns Point

- Location within Salem County, New Jersey Location within Delaware Location within New Jersey Location within the United States
- Coordinates: 39°36′21″N 75°33′38″W

Finns Point is a small promontory in Pennsville Township, Salem County, New Jersey, and New Castle County, Delaware, located at the southwest corner of the cape of Penns Neck, on the east bank of the Delaware River near its mouth on Delaware Bay. Due to the wording of the original charter defining the boundaries of New Jersey and Delaware, part of the promontory is actually enclosed within the state of Delaware's border, due to tidal flow and the manner in which the borders between New Jersey and Delaware were first laid out. Therefore, this portion of Finns Point, also called The Baja, is a pene-exclave of Delaware, cut off from the rest of the state by Delaware Bay. The area, the westernmost point in New Jersey, is about 10 miles (16 km) south of the city of Wilmington, and directly across the Delaware River from the New Castle area, and the Delaware River entrance to the Chesapeake & Delaware Canal. Pea Patch Island, part of the state of Delaware, sits in the channel of the river facing the promontory.

The area in Delaware was previously protected as Killcohook National Wildlife Refuge but is now a confined disposal facility used by the U.S. Army Corps of Engineers.

== 17th century ==
At the time of European colonization in the 17th century the Delaware River was known as the South River and the Salem River was known as Varkens Kill, or Hogg Creek.

Tradition holds that a settlement was first planted by Finns as part of the colony of New Sweden in 1638. among them, the family of Anders Sinicka, whose surname has many variations. This is recalled in the name of the road running along the shore south of the Port of Salem, Sinnicksons Landing Road. which bears the name of the a prominent Salem County family, including Thomas Sinnickson and his descendants.

In 1641, a group of 60 settlers (20 families) from the New Haven Colony (in today's Connecticut) purchased land along the kill. In 1643, the Governor of New Sweden built Fort Nya Elfsborg, just east of present-day Salem, New Jersey, and allowed the Varkens Kill settlement to remain if they swore allegiance to Sweden.

In 1651, Fort Casimir was constructed directly across the river on the west bank of the Delaware and by 1655, the region came under the control of New Netherland, which it remained until 1664 when the English overran the settlements on the south banks of the Delaware. The peninsula on the east banks became West Jersey. The town at Salem was founded in 1675 by John Fenwick, a Quaker.

== Military facilities ==
The promontory is the location of Finns Point National Cemetery, a military cemetery used in the American Civil War for Union and Confederate soldiers who died while at Fort Delaware on Pea Patch Island. It was also the location of Fort Mott, constructed after the Civil War and used up through World War I to protect the E.I. du Pont de Nemours and Company facilities upriver at Carneys Point Township, New Jersey, as well as the port of Philadelphia. The fort is now part of Fort Mott State Park.

== See also ==
- Twelve-Mile Circle
- Supawna Meadows National Wildlife Refuge
