= Finn's Point National Cemetery =

Historic veterans cemetery in Salem County, New Jersey

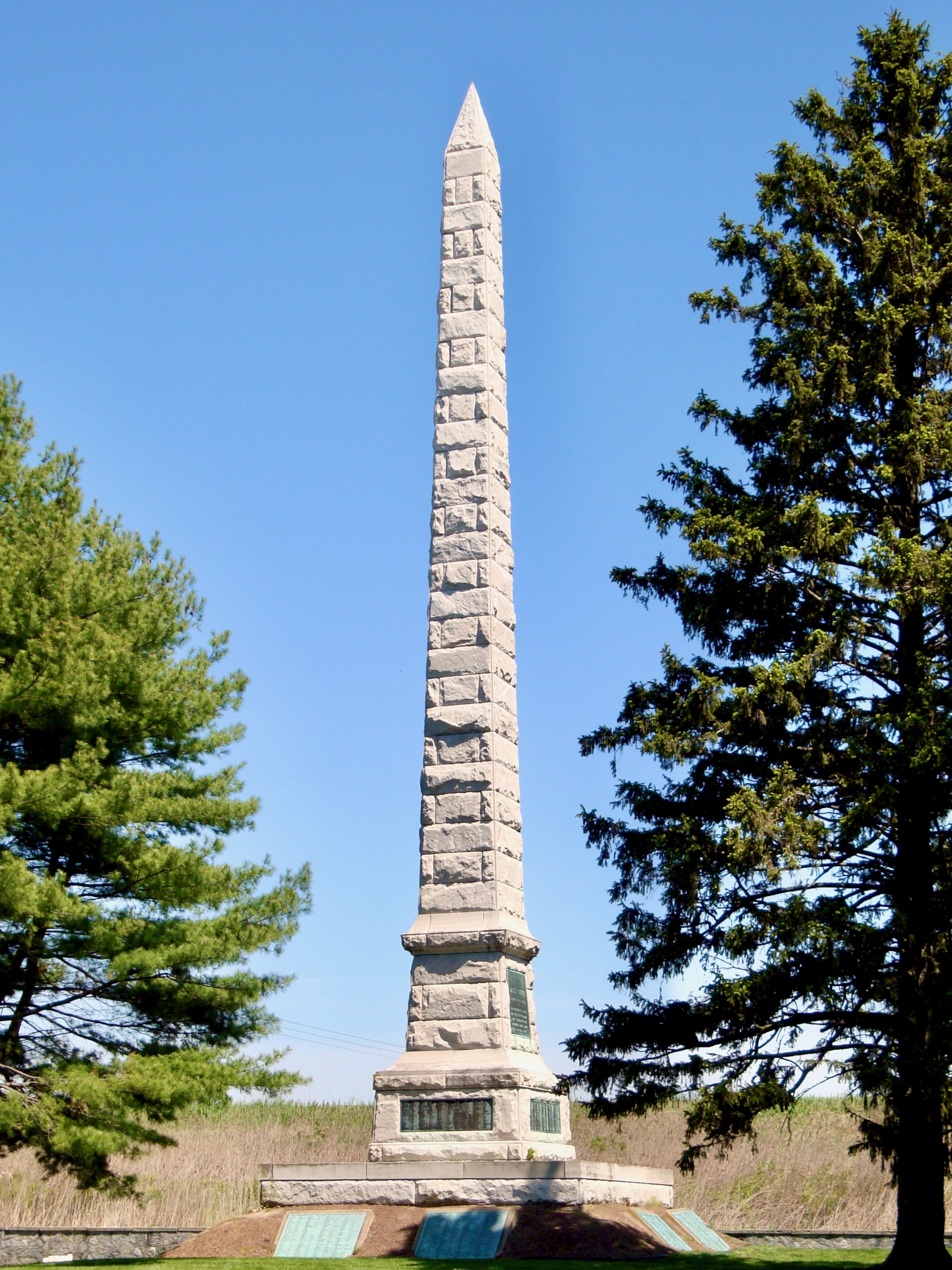
- Confederate Monument
- Interactive map of Finn's Point National Cemetery

Details
- Established: 1863
- Location: Pennsville, New Jersey
- Country: United States
- Type: Military Veterans
- Owned by: US Department of Veterans Affairs
- Size: 115 acres (47 ha)
- No. of graves: >3,500
- Website: Finn's Point National Cemetery
- Find a Grave: Finn's Point National Cemetery
- Fort Mott and Finns Point National Cemetery District
- U.S. National Register of Historic Places
- New Jersey Register of Historic Places
- Location within Salem County, New Jersey Location within New Jersey Location within the United States
- Coordinates: 39°36′40″N 75°33′21″W
- Area: 64.4 acres (261,000 m^{2})
- Built: 1863
- Architectural style: Greek Revival
- NRHP reference No.: 78001793
- NJRHP No.: 2442

Significant dates
- Added to NRHP: August 31, 1978
- Designated NJRHP: September 6, 1973

Finn's Point National Cemetery is a United States National Cemetery located in Pennsville Township, Salem County, New Jersey, United States. It encompasses 4.6 acres (1.9 ha), and as of February 2009, had 3,033 interments. Adjacent to Fort Mott, it is governed by the United States Department of Veterans Affairs and administered by the Washington Crossing National Cemetery.

== History ==
Originally purchased by the federal government to build a battery to protect the port of Philadelphia, the land became a cemetery by 1863 for Confederate prisoners of war who died while in captivity at Fort Delaware. One hundred and thirty five Union soldiers who died while serving as guards at the prison camp are also buried here. The death toll among prisoners of war and the guards was high, especially in the latter part of 1863 and throughout 1864. By July 1863, there were 12,595 prisoners on the island at nearby Fort Delaware which was only about 75 acres (30 ha) in size. Disease was rampant and nearly 2,700 prisoners died from malnutrition or neglect. Confederate prisoners interred at the cemetery totaled 2,436 and all are in a common grave as can still be seen as a huge pit in the north western corner of the site near the monument.

It was officially made a National Cemetery on October 3, 1875, by request of Virginia Governor James L. Kemper, who criticized the poor maintenance of the Confederate grave sites.

Finn's Point National Cemetery is north west of Supawna Meadows National Wildlife Refuge near Fort Mott State Park. The cemetery was added to the National Register of Historic Places on August 31, 1978, for its significance in architecture and military history.

Serial killer Andrew Cunanan committed one of his murders at the cemetery on May 9, 1997, killing cemetery caretaker William Reese and stealing his truck.

== Noteworthy monuments ==
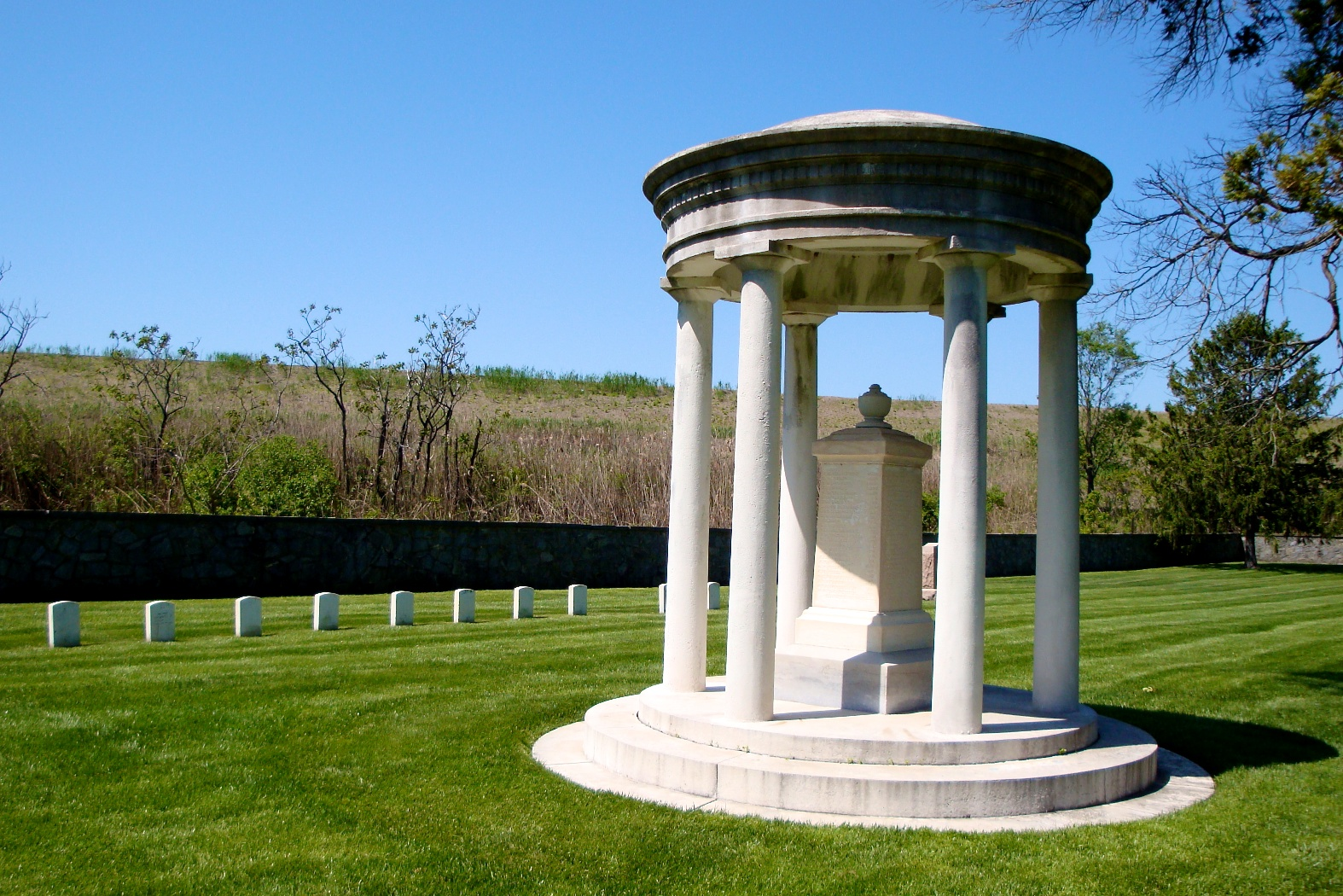
Union Monument

- The Confederate Monument, an 85-foot (26 m) tall granite obelisk, erected in 1910 by the federal government in memory of the 2,436 Confederate prisoners of war who died at Fort Delaware.
- The Union Monument, dedicated in 1879 to 135 Union soldiers who died while on duty at Fort Delaware.
- In the northwest corner, 13 white marble headstones mark the burial place of German prisoners of World War II who died while in custody at nearby Fort Dix, New Jersey.

== Gallery ==
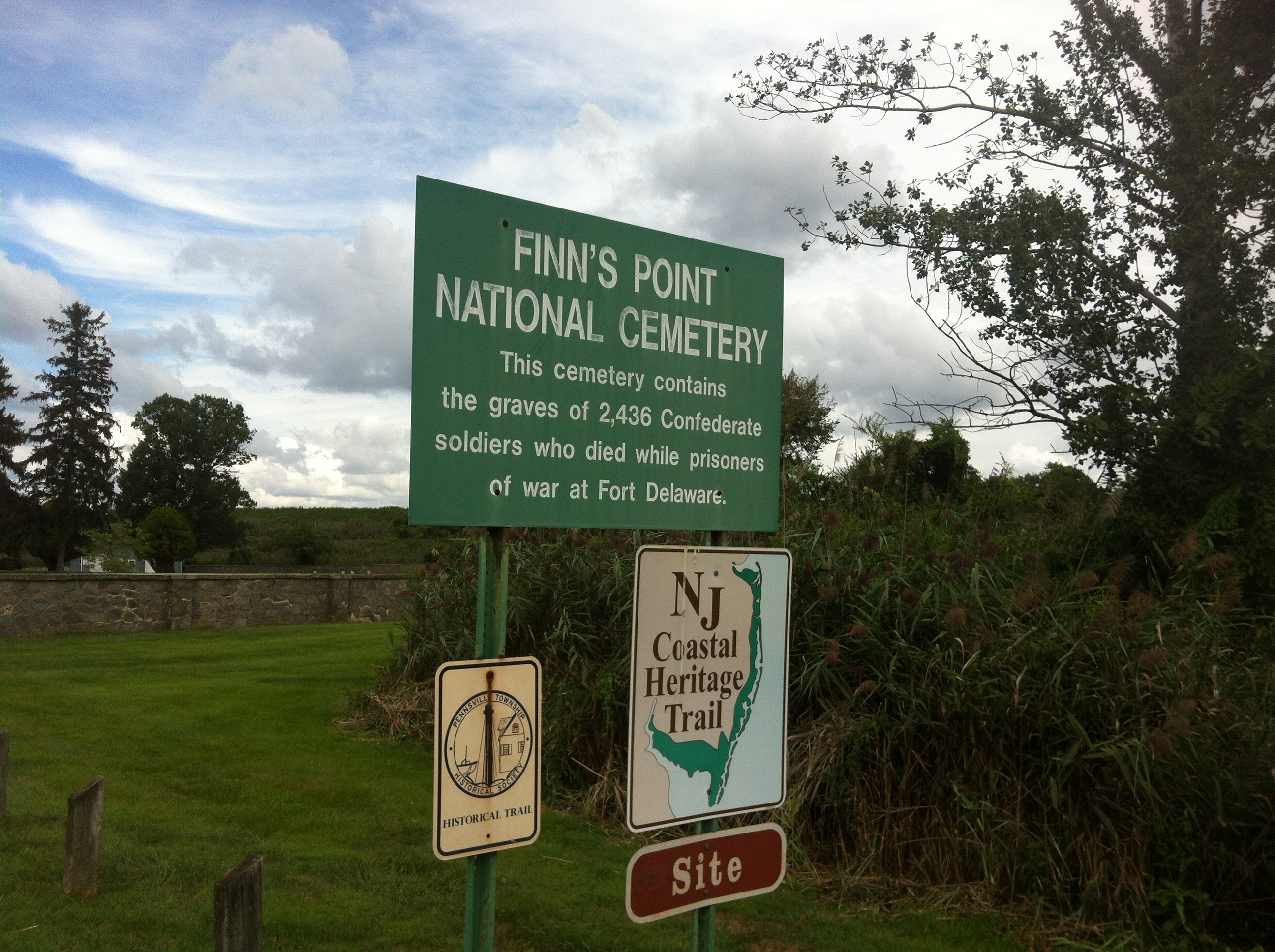
Welcome sign
