= Penns Neck (cape) =

- Cape
- Coordinates: 39°37′15″N 75°30′54″W

Penns Neck is a cape, or headland, extending into the Delaware River and is located in Pennsville Township, Salem County, New Jersey. The area was named after William Penn.

== See also ==
- Finns Point
