= Glades Wildlife Refuge =

Wildlife refuge

Coordinates: 39.271444°N 75.174828°W

- Interactive map of Glades Wildlife Refuge
- Location: Turkey Point Road, Newport, NJ, United States
- Area: 7,440 acres (3,010 ha)
- Established: 1964
- Website: https://natlands.org/glades-wildlife-refuge/

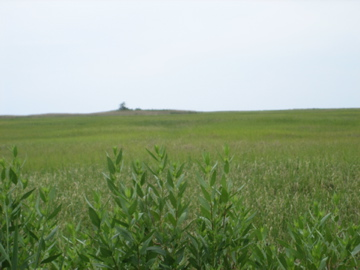
Marsh between Gandy's Beach and Fortescue

Glades Wildlife Refuge, also known as The Glades, is 7,440 acres (30.1 km^{2}) in Newport, New Jersey along the Delaware Bay. Owned by Natural Lands, this nature preserve is a landscape of tidal marshes, wooded uplands, beaches along the Delaware Bay, and an old growth forest. Glades Wildlife Refuge open from dawn till dusk daily and is publicly accessible at several points. Several of these points are part of New Jersey's Coastal Heritage Route. In the 1970's Glades Wildlife Refuge was the site of the last remaining nesting Bald Eagles in New Jersey. This location played a key role in the reintroduction of the Bald Eagle to the region.

== Public areas ==
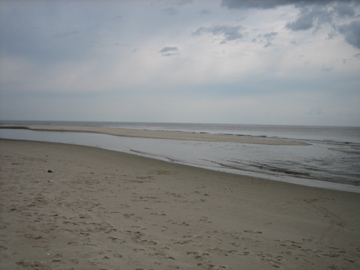
Beach in Fortescue

- The Russell Farm Trail, is a trail in the Glades that goes through forests and leads to an observation tower looking over a tidal marsh. Bald eagles, waterfowl and other birds can be seen from the observation tower during the year.
- Reineman Wildlife Sanctuary- This area open by appointment only

== Flora and fauna ==
Part of Bear Swamp, Bear Swamp West, is in the Refuge. Its broadleaf swamp forests contain 100 acres (40 ha) of old-growth forest, one of the largest such tracts in New Jersey.

Fortescue Beach and Raybins Beach are home to migratory birds each spring as well as horseshoe crabs, which lay their eggs on the sand at low tide. Parking along the road at Fortescue Beach is allowed in certain designated areas

Turkey Point is also home to migratory birds as well as nesting birds. The area is known for being home to the black rail and for crabbing in nearby Johnson's Ditch. The Wildlife Area at Turkey Point is always open and there is no admission charge.

== Activities ==
There are numerous marked trails throughout the refuge. Most of these trails have very limited parking by the trailheads.

== See also ==
- Supawna Meadows National Wildlife Refuge
- Cape May National Wildlife Refuge
- Edwin B. Forsythe National Wildlife Refuge
- Killcohook National Wildlife Refuge
- The Glades (Florida)
- Natural Lands
