= Middle Ground Island =

Island in California

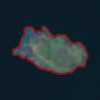
- USGS aerial imagery of Middle Ground Island

- Location within Sacramento-San Joaquin River Delta Location within California Location within the United States

Geography
- Location: Northern California
- Coordinates: 38°03′46″N 121°58′53″W
- Adjacent to: Sacramento–San Joaquin River Delta
- Highest elevation: 0 ft (0 m)

Administration
- United States
- State: California
- County: Solano

Middle Ground Island is an island in Suisun Bay, an embayment of San Francisco Bay, downstream of the Sacramento–San Joaquin River Delta. It is part of Solano County, California, and not managed by any reclamation district. Its coordinates are 38°03′46″N 121°58′53″W, and the United States Geological Survey measured its elevation as 0 ft (0 m) in 1981.
