= Bear Swamp (New Jersey) =

Swamp in Cumberland County, New Jersey

Coordinates: 39.279°N 75.078°W

Bear Swamp is a swamp in Cumberland County, southwestern New Jersey, notable for its 215 acres (87 ha) of old-growth forests and the birds they contain. It is divided into two areas, Bear Swamp East and Bear Swamp West, separated from each other by gravel mines and roads.

== Bear Swamp West ==
Bear Swamp West contains broadleaf swamp forest dominated by black gum, American sweetgum, red maple, and sweetbay magnolia. Other trees present are American beech, swamp white oak, and American holly. Some 100 acres (40 ha) of this forest is old-growth filled with trees of impressive sizes and ages. The black gum are nearly 4 feet (120 cm) in diameter and 600 years old. The sweetgum again nearly 4 feet (120 cm) in diameter, and 300 years old. The red maple are over 4 feet (120 cm) in diameter. The American holly are particularly large, reaching 22 inches (56 cm) in diameter and 80 feet (24 m) tall.

== Bear Swamp East ==
Bear Swamp East is in Belleplain State Forest. It covers 1,439 acres (582 ha) and contains 115 acres (47 ha) of old-growth forest. It has forests similar to Bear Swamp West, but with large Tulip Poplar on hummocks, some reaching 5 feet (150 cm) in diameter and 400 years of age.

== Habitat for birds ==
As many as 30 bald eagles nest in the swamp, and it is home to the oldest continuously occupied bald eagle nest in New Jersey. It is a breeding site for red-shouldered hawks, barred owls, and Cooper's hawks, all species of concern in the state. It is one of just two known breeding sites in southern New Jersey for pileated woodpeckers.

== See also ==
- List of old growth forests
- Glades Wildlife Refuge
