= Artificial Island (Delaware River) =

U.S. man-made island in the Delaware River

- Location within New Jersey

Geography
- Location: Atlantic Ocean
- Coordinates: 39.4757°N 75.5360°W

Administration
- United States

Artificial Island is a U.S. island located along the eastern shore of the Delaware River, mostly in southwestern New Jersey with a tiny portion inside Delaware's boundaries. It is part of both Lower Alloways Creek Township, Salem County, New Jersey and New Castle County, Delaware. The island is separated from mainland New Jersey by Alloway Creek and Hope Creek. It is called "artificial" since portions of the island are composed of land reclaimed from Delaware Bay.

== Geography ==
The island is geographically unusual since it contains one of two tiny pene-exclaves of the state of Delaware, which is created by the Delaware-New Jersey land border crossing the northern tip of the island, an area that is completely cut off from the rest of Delaware across the Delaware River to the west, and has no road connections to it. New Jersey is separated from Delaware by the Delaware River except for these two areas, which has a land border. The only land access to this exclave at the north tip of the island is from New Jersey.

This exclave was created as a result of the Twelve-Mile Circle, which was part of the resolution of the colonial-era Penn-Calvert Boundary Dispute among what would become the states of Pennsylvania, Maryland, Delaware, New Jersey, and West Virginia.

The other exclave of Delaware is Finns Point north of Artificial Island, in Pennsville Township to the northwest of Fort Mott State Park, New Jersey.

== Nuclear power plants ==
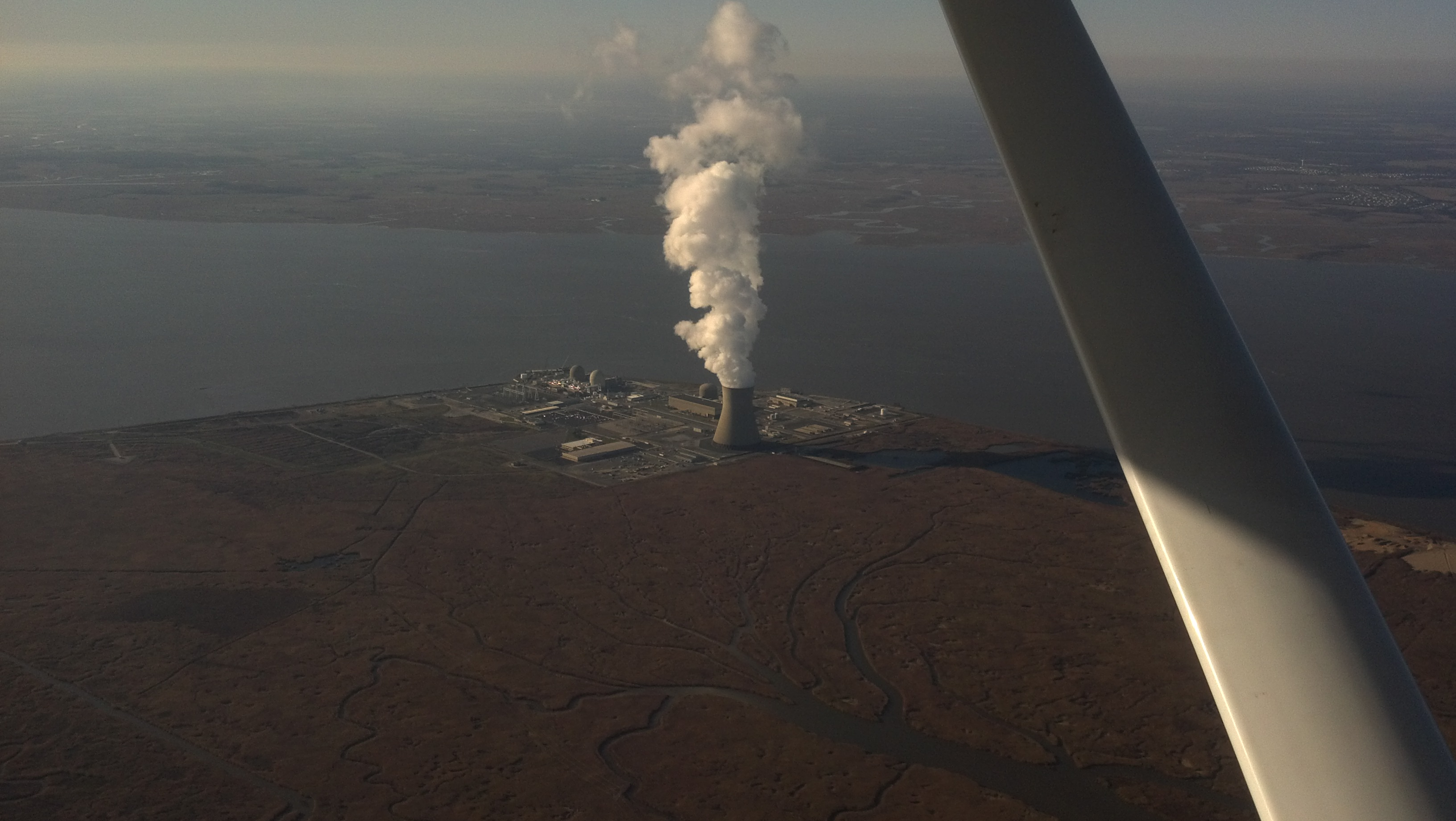
Aerial view of nuclear power plant reservation for Salem and Hope Creek on the southwest corner of Artificial Island, 2011.

The island is located at 39.4756672°N latitude, 75.5360354°W longitude. Salem Nuclear Power Plant and Hope Creek Nuclear Generating Station are located at the southwest end of the island.

== New Jersey Wind Port ==
In June 2020, Governor Phil Murphy announced plans to develop the New Jersey Wind Port, a first-in-the-nation offshore wind port infrastructure investment that will provide a location for essential staging, assembly, and manufacturing activities related to offshore projects for wind power offshore New Jersey and on the East Coast. The site, which would allow for the docking of heavy-lift ships, is not hindered by air draft restrictions since there is no bridge downstream of the facility, allowing passage of massive wind turbines.

The Wind Port has the potential to create up to 1,500 manufacturing, assembly, and operations jobs, as well as hundreds of construction jobs. Manufacturing and marshalling projects supported by the Wind Port will drive economic growth in Salem County, in South Jersey, and throughout the state. The state is committed to using union labor to construct the Wind Port and intends to set a new standard for inclusion of minority and women workers and business owners. Construction began in September 2021.

== See also ==
- Finns Point
- Penn-Calvert Boundary Dispute
- Twelve-Mile Circle
