= Fort Delaware State Park =

State park in Delaware, United States

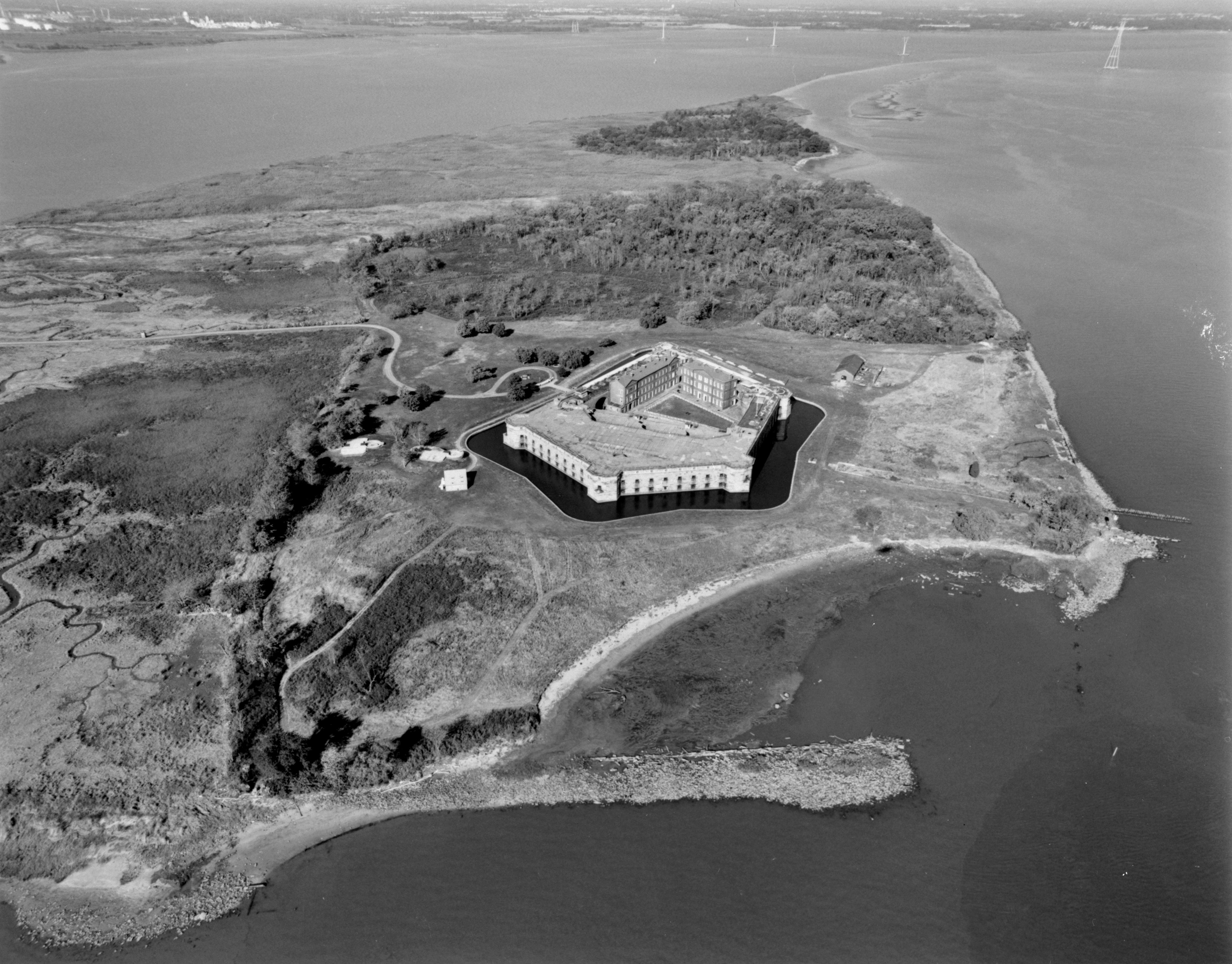
- An aerial view of Fort Delaware State Park

- Location within Delaware Location within the United States
- Location: New Castle County, Delaware, United States
- Coordinates: 39°35′22″N 75°34′03″W
- Area: 248.55 acres (100.58 ha)
- Elevation: 3 feet (0.91 m)
- Established: 1951
- Administrator: Delaware Department of Natural Resources and Environmental Control
- Website: Official website

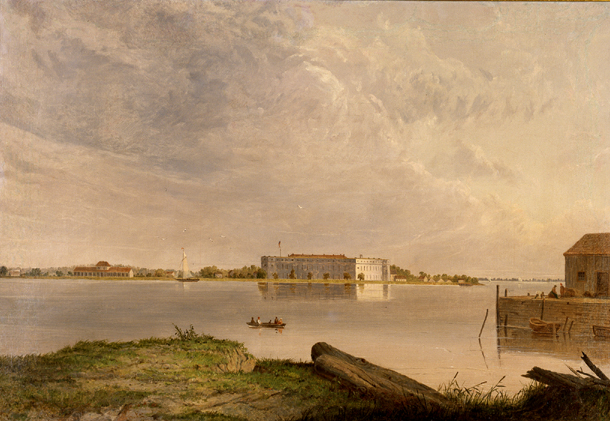
Fort Delaware, Delaware by Seth Eastman (1808–1875), painted 1870-1875

Fort Delaware State Park is a 248-acre (100 ha), 1-mile-long (1.6 km) Delaware state park on Pea Patch Island in the mid channel of the Delaware River near its entrance into Delaware Bay. It is a low, marshy island in New Castle County, Delaware, facing Delaware City on the Delaware shore and Finns Point on the New Jersey shore. Fort Delaware was built on Pea Patch Island by the United States Army in 1815, near the conclusion of the War of 1812, to protect the harbors of Wilmington, Delaware and Philadelphia, Pennsylvania. The fort was burned and rebuilt in the years prior to the American Civil War, and soon after the start of the war the fort was converted to a Prisoner of War camp. Fort Delaware continued to protect the mouth of the Delaware River through World War I and II. Pea Patch Island and Fort Delaware was declared surplus land by the United States Department of Defense in 1945.

Fort Delaware State Park, one of the first state parks in Delaware, was established in 1951. The park, which can only be accessed by ferry, is open for historic programs at Fort Delaware. The fort is listed on the National Register of Historic Places. In addition to historical preservation, Fort Delaware State Park is also open for picnicking and hiking. The island also provides a significant wetlands stop for migratory birds including herons along the Atlantic Flyway.

Visitors to the park may reach it by ferry from Delaware City or Fort Mott State Park in New Jersey. Fort Delaware State Park is 0.5 miles (800 m) from Delaware City via the Forts Ferry Crossing. Passengers aboard the ferry are granted access to Fort Mott State Park.

== History ==
Pea Patch Island emerged as a mud bank in the Delaware River in the 18th century. According to folklore, the island received its name after a ship full of peas ran aground on it, spilling its contents and leading to a growth of the plant on the island. In the 1790s, Pierre L'Enfant suggested the use of the island as part of the defenses of New Castle, Delaware and Philadelphia. During the War of 1812, a seawall and dykes were built on the island, with a view to building a martello tower there.

By 1814, the island had grown sufficiently large for the construction of Fort Delaware. A five-pointed wooden star fort was built 1815–1824. However, this fort was wrecked by a fire in 1831. Construction began on a much larger polygonal fort in 1836, but this project was derailed by a decade-long legal battle over which state owned the island, which was won by Delaware. Construction then began in 1848 on the current fort, with an irregular pentagon design about the size of the previous star fort. The current brick and concrete fort was substantially complete by 1860. During the American Civil War, Fort Delaware was used by the Union as a camp for Confederate prisoners, in particular those captured in 1863 at the Battle of Gettysburg. Many of the prisoners who died at the fort are buried at nearby Finns Point National Cemetery in New Jersey.

After the release of the last of the remaining Civil War prisoners, only a small caretaker force was left behind at Fort Delaware, and it was largely abandoned in 1870. By 1898, rising tensions between Spain and the United States led to Fort Delaware once again serving as a potential frontline in protecting the ports of the Delaware River. The United States Congress authorized the installation of three 16-inch (41 cm) guns at the south end of Pea Patch Island as part of the Endicott program, with batteries for smaller guns elsewhere on the island. The guns were installed in 1898, at the time of the Spanish–American War. On the shores flanking the island, Fort DuPont and Fort Mott were built with modern weapons, and preparations were made to lay underwater minefields in the river. A garrison was once again in place at Fort Delaware until 1903, when another small caretaker force was left.

The fort was garrisoned once again in 1917, following the United States entry into World War I, but most troops left in 1919. Fort Delaware was manned again during World War II following the December 7, 1941 Attack of Pearl Harbor. The defenses around Pea Patch Island were disarmed during World War II, as Fort Miles at the mouth of the Delaware estuary superseded them. The guns were removed in 1943, the fort was abandoned in 1944, and it was declared "surplus property" in 1945. In the early 20th century, the U.S. Army Corps of Engineers dredged a channel around the island, using the infill to double the island's size on its northern end.

Ownership of Pea Patch Island and Fort Delaware was transferred to the state of Delaware in 1947. Fort Delaware State Park was opened to the public in 1951.

== Historic interpretation ==
Fort Delaware State Park is a center of historic Civil War interpretation. Reenactors provide a glimpse into the past of Pea Patch Island. Visitors may have the chance to watch a blacksmith at work, take part in the firing of a gunpowder charge of an 8-inch (20 cm) Columbiad gun or assist a laundress at work.

A group of reenactors pays special attention to Captain George Ahl and his band of former confederate soldiers who formed the 1st Delaware Heavy Artillery. Captain Ahl obtained permission from the War Department to form a battery of Confederate prisoners who could prove they had been conscripted into the Confederate Army. Upon taking an oath of allegiance they were permitted to join the Federal Army. Volunteers have recreated Ahl's Battery at Fort Delaware State Park. They have assumed the identities of members of the battery. The reenactors give demonstrations of what life was like for the members of the 1st Delaware Heavy Artillery.

The Fort Delaware Society is a non-profit group dedicated to the preservation and historical interpretation of Fort Delaware.

== Wildlife ==
Fort Delaware State Park is home to a migratory bird rookery, considered to be the largest heronry north of Florida. Ornithologists believe that ibises, egrets, and herons began nesting on the northern part of Pea Patch Island in the 1950s or 1960s on land that was deposited there by the United States Army Corps of Engineers in the early 1900s. The population of birds at Fort Delaware State Park grew from about 2,000 pairs of nesting birds to 12,000 pairs as they were pushed from their nesting areas on the mainland by man. Scientists have become concerned about the decreasing population of birds on Pea Patch Island. The present estimate of nesting pairs stands at 7,000. Studies have shown that nearly half the chicks born at the heronry within the last five years have died before they were old enough to leave their parents care.

Other than coastal erosion, scientists have found little at the park to threaten the herons, ibises, and egrets. It is believed that changing land-use in the estuary and surrounding land has affected the populations. Representatives from local, state and federal governments have teamed together with non-profit wildlife organizations, business, and industry to create a Special Area Management Plan to help change the downward trend in bird populations at Fort Delaware State Park. Since Beach erosion affecting Pea Patch Island was recognized as a potential threat to the Fort in 1999, the United States Army Corps of Engineers erected a 3,500-foot (1.1 km) seawall during the winter of 2005–2006.
