= Pennsville (CDP), New Jersey =

Populated place in Salem County, New Jersey, US

Pennsville, New Jersey
- Census-designated place
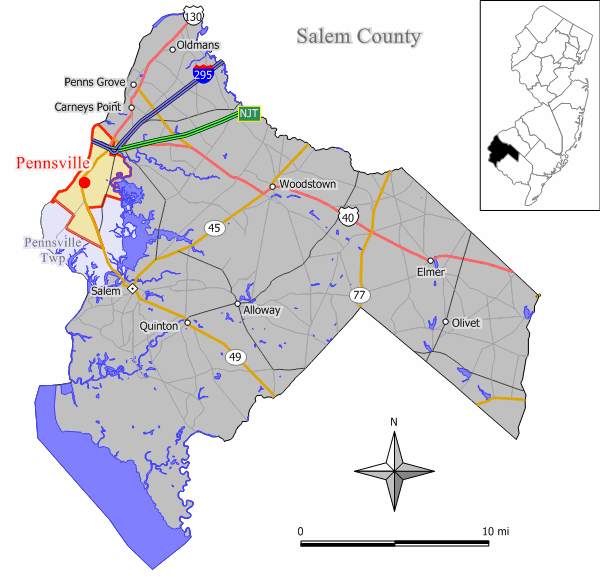
- Location of Pennsville CDP in Salem County highlighted in red (left). Inset map: Location of Salem County in New Jersey highlighted in black (right).

- Location in Salem County Location in New Jersey Location in the United States
- Coordinates: 39.652074°N 75.509256°W
- Country: United States
- State: New Jersey
- County: Salem
- Township: Pennsville

Area
  - Total: 11.08 sq mi (28.70 km^{2})
  - Land: 10.72 sq mi (27.77 km^{2})
  - Water: 0.36 sq mi (0.93 km^{2}) 3.42%
- Elevation: 9.8 ft (3 m)

Population (2020)
  - Total: 12,043
  - Density: 1,123.2/sq mi (433.66/km^{2})
- Time zone: UTC−05:00 (Eastern (EST))
  - Summer (DST): UTC−04:00 (Eastern (EDT))
- ZIP Code: 08070
- Area code: 856
- FIPS code: 34-00850
- GNIS feature ID: 02389125

Pennsville is an unincorporated community and census-designated place (CDP) located within Pennsville Township, in Salem County, in the U.S. state of New Jersey. As of the 2010 United States census, the CDP's population was 11,888.

Pennsville CDP and Pennsville Township are not coextensive, with the CDP covering 42.4% of the 24.588 miles (39.571 km) of the township as a whole.

== Geography ==
According to the United States Census Bureau, Pennsville had a total area of 10.422 square miles (26.99 km^{2}), including 10.065 square miles (26.07 km^{2}) of land and 0.357 square miles (0.92 km^{2}) of water (3.42%).

== Demographics ==
Historical population
Census	Pop.	Note	%±
1970	11,014		—
1980	12,467		13.2%
1990	12,218		−2.0%
2000	11,657		−4.6%
2010	11,888		2.0%
2020	12,043		1.3%
Population sources: 1980; 1990-2010; 1950 1960 1970; 1980 1990 2000; 2010 2020

Pennsville first appeared as an unincorporated community in the 1970 U.S. census; and then was listed as a census designated place in the 1980 U.S. census.

=== 2020 census ===
Pennsville CDP, New Jersey – Racial and ethnic composition Note: the US Census treats Hispanic/Latino as an ethnic category. This table excludes Latinos from the racial categories and assigns them to a separate category. Hispanics/Latinos may be of any race.
Race / Ethnicity (NH = Non-Hispanic)	Pop 2000	Pop 2010	Pop 2020	% 2000	% 2010	% 2020
White alone (NH)	11,200	11,106	10,219	96.08%	93.42%	84.85%
Black or African American alone (NH)	65	147	378	0.56%	1.24%	3.14%
Native American or Alaska Native alone (NH)	16	22	25	0.14%	0.19%	0.21%
Asian alone (NH)	103	159	191	0.88%	1.34%	1.59%
Native Hawaiian or Pacific Islander alone (NH)	2	2	0	0.02%	0.02%	0.00%
Other race alone (NH)	8	5	26	0.07%	0.04%	0.22%
Mixed race or Multiracial (NH)	78	110	557	0.67%	0.93%	4.63%
Hispanic or Latino (any race)	185	337	647	1.59%	2.83%	5.37%
Total	11,657	11,888	12,043	100.00%	100.00%	100.00%

=== 2010 census ===
The 2010 United States census counted 11,888 people, 4,854 households, and 3,296 families in the CDP. The population density was 1,181.1 people per square mile (456.0 people/km^{2}). There were 5,209 housing units at an average density of 517.5 units per square mile (199.8 units/km^{2}). The racial makeup was 95.07% (11,302) White, 1.34% (159) Black or African American, 0.23% (27) Native American, 1.35% (160) Asian, 0.02% (2) Pacific Islander, 0.87% (104) from other races, and 1.13% (134) from two or more races. Hispanic or Latino of any race were 2.83% (337) of the population.

Of the 4,854 households, 27.3% had children under the age of 18; 50.6% were married couples living together; 12.2% had a female householder with no husband present and 32.1% were non-families. Of all households, 27.1% were made up of individuals and 11.7% had someone living alone who was 65 years of age or older. The average household size was 2.45 and the average family size was 2.97.

21.9% of the population were under the age of 18, 7.8% from 18 to 24, 24.9% from 25 to 44, 29.7% from 45 to 64, and 15.7% who were 65 years of age or older. The median age was 41.8 years. For every 100 females, the population had 95.4 males. For every 100 females ages 18 and older there were 92.0 males.

=== 2000 census ===
As of the 2000 United States census there were 11,657 people, 4,684 households, and 3,292 families living in the CDP. The population density was 429.5 people/km^{2} (1,112 people/mi^{2}). There were 4,930 housing units at an average density of 181.6 units/km^{2} (470 units/mi^{2}). The racial makeup of the CDP was 97.11% White, 0.68% African American, 0.16% Native American, 0.88% Asian, 0.02% Pacific Islander, 0.38% from other races, and 0.77% from two or more races. 1.59% of the population were Hispanic or Latino of any race.

There were 4,684 households, out of which 29.8% had children under the age of 18 living with them, 55.8% were married couples living together, 10.4% had a female householder with no husband present, and 29.7% were non-families. 25.4% of all households were made up of individuals, and 11.6% had someone living alone who was 65 years of age or older. The average household size was 2.49 and the average family size was 2.98.

In the CDP the population was spread out, with 23.3% under the age of 18, 7.9% from 18 to 24, 28.3% from 25 to 44, 25.3% from 45 to 64, and 15.2% who were 65 years of age or older. The median age was 39 years. For every 100 females, there were 92.1 males. For every 100 females age 18 and over, there were 89.8 males.

The median income for a household in the CDP was $47,494, and the median income for a family was $57,290. Males had a median income of $46,157 versus $29,818 for females. The per capita income for the CDP was $22,522. 5.1% of the population and 3.4% of families were below the poverty line. Out of the total people living in poverty, 5.3% are under the age of 18 and 4.7% are 65 or older.
