= Fort Mott (New Jersey) =

State park in Salem County, New Jersey

- Part of Harbor Defenses of the Delaware
- Pennsville Township, New Jersey

Site information
- Type: Fortification
- Owner: Public - State of New Jersey
- Open to the public: Yes
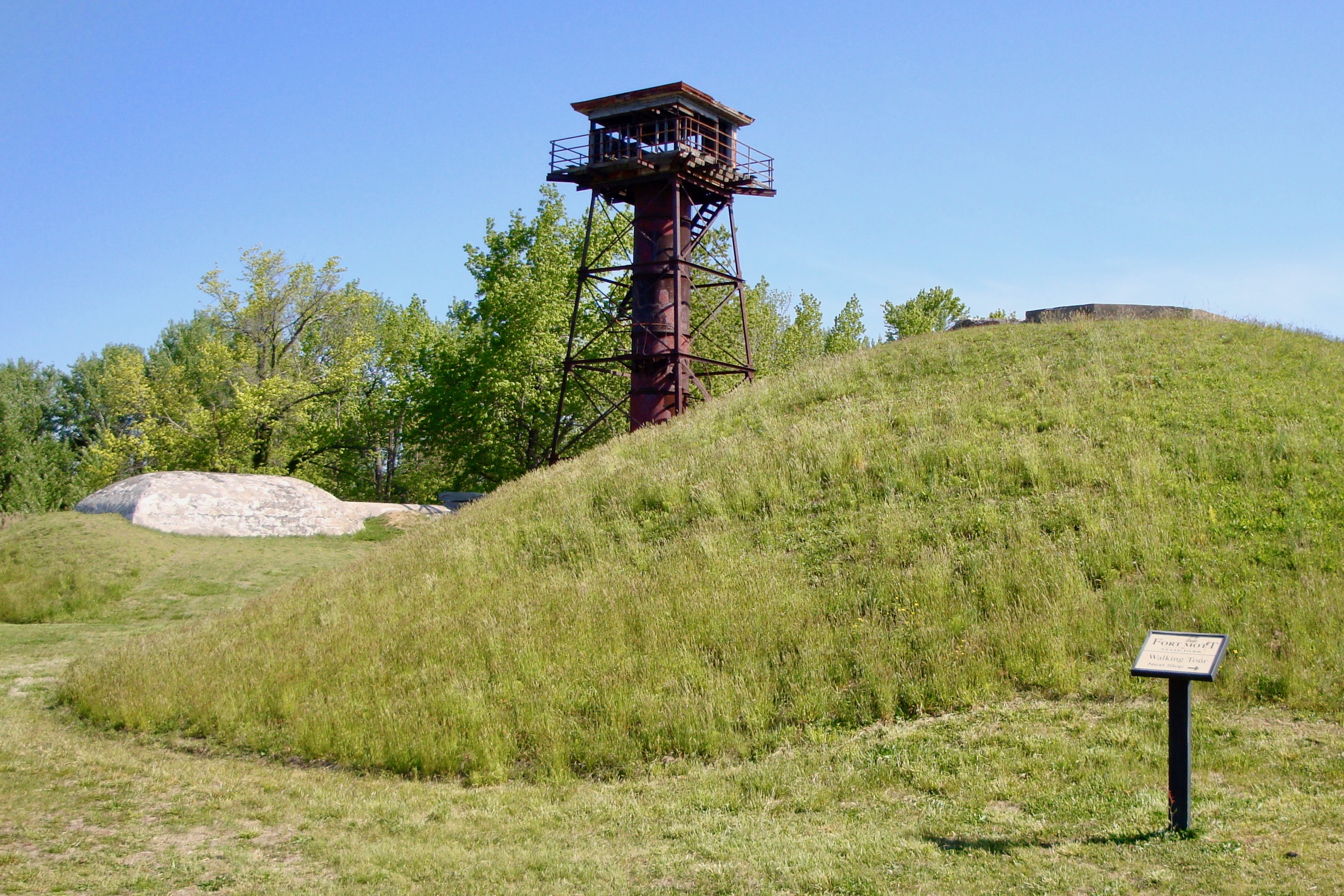
- Gun fire control tower and observation stand
- Area: 124 acres (0.50 km^{2})
- Operator: New Jersey Division of Parks and Forestry
- Website: Official website
- Fort Mott and Finns Point National Cemetery District
- U.S. National Register of Historic Places
- New Jersey Register of Historic Places
- Location within Salem County, New Jersey Location within New Jersey Location within the United States
- Coordinates: 39°36′11″N 75°33′09″W
- Area: 64.4 acres (261,000 m^{2})
- NRHP reference No.: 78001793
- NJRHP No.: 2442

Significant dates
- Added to NRHP: August 31, 1978
- Designated NJRHP: September 6, 1973

Site history
- Built: 1896–1900
- Built by: U.S. Army Corps of Engineers
- In use: 1899–1922, 1941–1943
- Materials: Reinforced concrete, earth

Fort Mott, located in Pennsville, Salem County, New Jersey, United States, was part of the Harbor Defenses of the Delaware, a three-fort defense system designed for the Delaware River during the Reconstruction era and Endicott program modernization periods following the American Civil War and in the 1890s. The other two forts in the system were Fort Delaware on Pea Patch Island and Fort DuPont in Delaware City, Delaware. It was active for the Spanish American War and World War I. It was closed in 1944, and sold to the state of New Jersey to become Fort Mott State Park.

== History ==
The original plans for Fort Mott (initially called the "Battery at Finn's Point") specified eleven gun emplacements for Rodman smoothbore guns and a mortar battery with six emplacements. Construction was started in 1872; however, only two of the gun emplacements and two magazines in the mortar battery were completed by 1876 when all work stopped due to a general suspension of fort work. The Board of Fortifications, often called the Endicott Board, recommended a comprehensive program of new fortifications in 1885. A new Fort Mott was one of the results, and it was completed by 1902 as part of the Harbor Defenses of the Delaware.

Unusually for US coast defense forts built 1895-1935, Fort Mott was designed to resist a land attack. A parados (basically an artificial hill) and moat were placed behind the gun batteries to impede an assault from the landward side. Also, the fort's four 5-inch guns were in mounts permitting 360° of fire, and were sited to fire on attackers flanking the parados.

The fort had a typical armament for its day, with a few exceptions. The main armament was Battery Arnold (3 12-inch guns) and Battery Harker (3 10-inch guns). These were on disappearing carriages to allow the guns to normally remain hidden from observation from the river. Flanking these were Battery Gregg, with two 5-inch M1900 guns on M1903 pedestal mounts, and Battery Krayenbuhl, with two 5-inch M1897 guns on balanced pillar mounts, each with all-around fire. Battery Krayenbuhl was sited atop the fort's smallest and most unusual battery, Battery Edwards with two 3-inch mine defense guns in large casemates rebuilt from earlier (1872) magazines. These casemated light guns, intended to protect an underwater minefield in the river by driving off minesweepers, were a unique installation in US forts of this era, in which virtually all emplacements were open-top.

War Department General Order #72, issued on December 16, 1897, designated the new fort as Fort Mott, in honor of Major General Gershom Mott, of Trenton. Gershom Mott had served with distinction as a Second Lieutenant in the 10th Infantry in the Mexican–American War, as a Lieutenant-Colonel in the 5th New Jersey Volunteer Infantry, and as Colonel and commander of the 6th New Jersey Volunteer Infantry before he was promoted to Brigadier General. He was wounded four times, resigned from the Army in 1866, and died on November 29, 1884.

Battery Arnold was named for Brigadier General Lewis G. Arnold, an artillery officer in the Seminole Wars and the Civil War, who died in 1871. Battery Harker was named for Brigadier General Charles G. Harker, killed at Kennesaw Mountain in the Civil War. Battery Gregg was named for Captain John C. Gregg, killed in action during the Philippine–American War. Battery Krayenbuhl was named for Captain Maurice Krayenbuhl, also killed in action during the Philippine–American War. Battery Edwards was named for Captain Robert Edwards, killed in the War of 1812.

Fort Mott, along with Fort Delaware and Fort DuPont, became obsolete as the principal defensive installations on the Delaware River with the construction of Fort Saulsbury, near Slaughter Beach, Delaware, shortly after World War I. Fort Saulsbury had four 12-inch (305 mm) guns on long-range barbette carriages and was sited to engage the enemy much further down the estuary than the earlier forts. The Harbor Defenses of the Delaware was one of the most extreme examples of coast defense forts being built further seaward as gun ranges increased. In 1910 the two five-inch guns of Battery Gregg were transferred to Fort Ruger, Hawaii, and in 1918 the similar guns of Battery Krayenbuhl were removed for potential service as field guns on the Western Front. In 1920 the unique Battery Edwards was disarmed as part of a general removal from service of the 3-inch gun M1898.

Troops were regularly stationed at Fort Mott from 1897 to 1922. The federal government kept a caretaking detachment at the fort from 1922 to 1943. New Jersey acquired the military reservation as a historic site and State park in 1947. Fort Mott State Park was opened to the public on June 24, 1951. The site is operated and maintained by the New Jersey Division of Parks and Forestry, and is located in Pennsville Township, New Jersey. Fort Mott and Finn's Point National Cemetery were listed together on the National Register of Historic Places on August 31, 1978.

The three 10-inch guns of Battery Harker were transferred to Canada in 1941 via Lend-Lease. Two of these remain as of 2014 at Fort Cape Spear, St. John's, Newfoundland. In 1943 Fort Mott was disarmed, losing its remaining three 12-inch guns, the fort being superseded by Fort Miles at Cape Henlopen. As with most post-Civil War US coastal fortifications outside the Philippines, Fort Mott's guns were fired only for training and testing, never in battle.

As of 2018, Fort Mott is connected with Fort Delaware and Delaware City by a seasonal passenger ferry operated by Fort Delaware State Park.

== See also ==
- National Register of Historic Places listings in Salem County, New Jersey
- Seacoast defense in the United States
- United States Army Coast Artillery Corps
- Harbor Defense Command
- List of coastal fortifications of the United States
