= Pennsville Township, New Jersey =

Township in Salem County, New Jersey, US

- Township
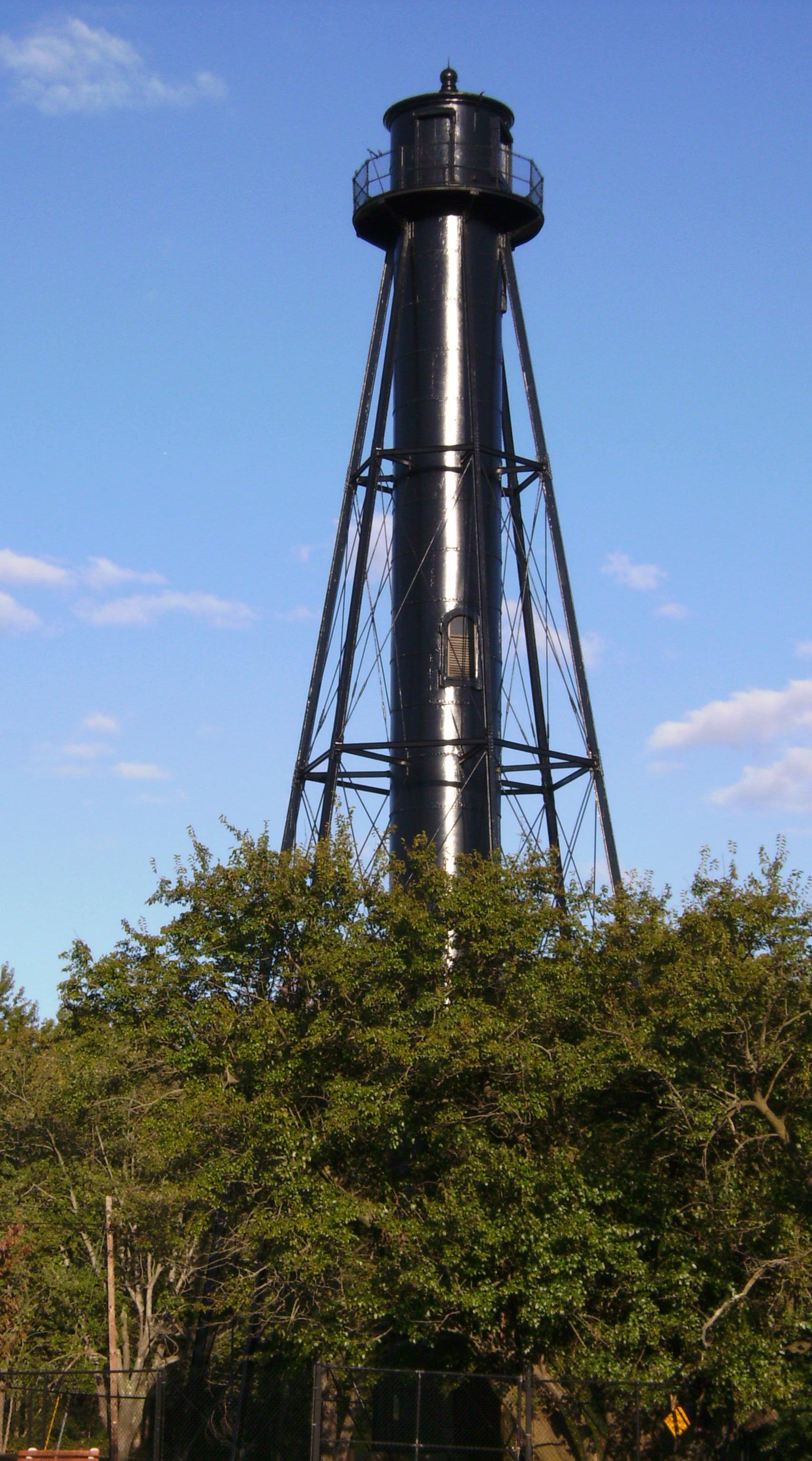
- Finn's Point Rear Range Light

- Seal

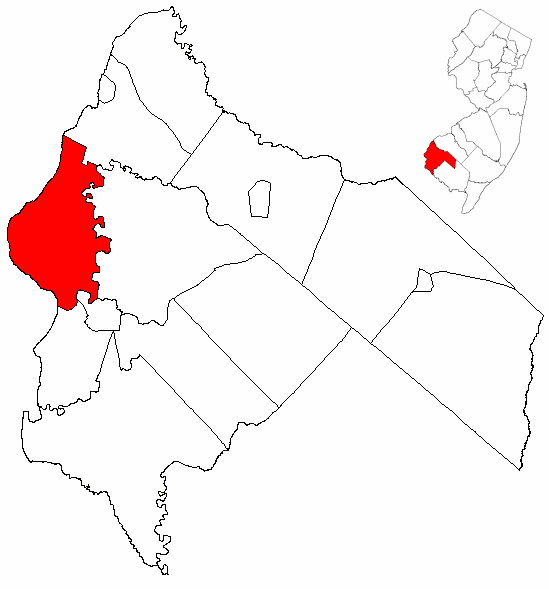
- Pennsville Township highlighted in Salem County. Inset map: Salem County highlighted in New Jersey.

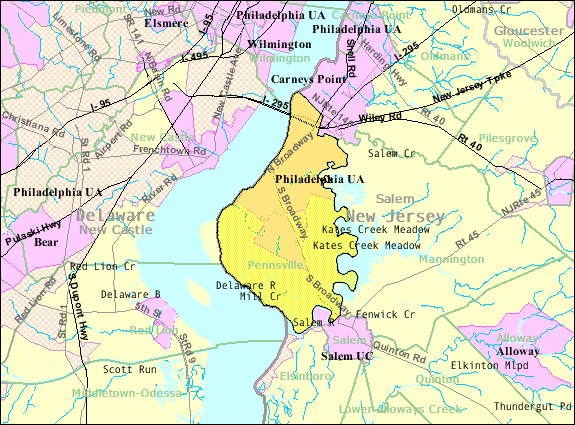
- map of Pennsville Township, New Jersey

- Location in Salem County Location in New Jersey Location in the United States
- Coordinates: 39.626341°N 75.503451°W
- Country: United States
- State: New Jersey
- County: Salem
- Formed: July 10, 1721 as Lower Penns Neck Township
- Incorporated: February 21, 1798
- Renamed: November 2, 1965 as Pennsville Township
- Named for: William Penn

Government
  - Type: Township
  - Body: Township Committee
  - Mayor: Daniel J. Neu (R, term ends December 31, 2026)
  - Administrator: Jack Lynch
  - Municipal clerk: Angela Foote

Area
  - Total: 24.58 sq mi (63.66 km^{2})
  - Land: 21.27 sq mi (55.08 km^{2})
  - Water: 3.31 sq mi (8.58 km^{2}) 13.48%
  - Rank: 111th of 565 in state 7th of 15 in county
- Elevation: 16 ft (4.9 m)

Population (2020)
  - Total: 12,684
  - Estimate (2023): 12,765
  - Rank: 201st of 565 in state 1st of 15 in county
  - Density: 596.4/sq mi (230.3/km^{2})
  - Rank: 431st of 565 in state 5th of 15 in county
- Time zone: UTC−05:00 (Eastern (EST))
  - Summer (DST): UTC−04:00 (Eastern (EDT))
- ZIP Code: 08070
- Area code: 856
- FIPS code: 3403357870
- GNIS feature ID: 0882134
- Website: www.pennsville.org

Pennsville Township is a township in Salem County, in the U.S. state of New Jersey. The township is named for William Penn. It is the westernmost town in New Jersey. As of the 2020 United States census, the township's population was 12,684, a decrease of 725 (−5.4%) from the 2010 census count of 13,409, which in turn reflected an increase of 215 (+1.6%) from the 13,194 counted in the 2000 census.

The township had the 24th-highest property tax rate in New Jersey, with an equalized rate of 4.285% in 2020, compared to 3.476% in the county as a whole and a statewide average of 2.279%. The township, and all of Salem County, is part of South Jersey and the Philadelphia metropolitan area.

== History ==
=== Early history ===
At the time of the European settlements in America in the 1600s, the Lenni Lenape Tribe called Unilachtigo occupied the area, calling it "Hoppemense." In 1638 Sweden established a trading fort in Wilmington, and called it Fort Christina. Only 24 Swedish Soldiers came on the first expedition. Their orders were to buy land, build a fort and establish trade on the West side of the Delaware River. There were no colonists at Fort Christina in 1638. It wasn't until 1641 that the Swedes purchased land on the east side of the Delaware River. A May 1671 Census of the Delaware by Walter Wharton documents Swedes and Finns living on the East side of the Delaware River in what is known as Pennsville today.

==== Fenwick's Colony ====
When English Quaker John Fenwick arrived in 1675 to colonize his territory in West Jersey, called Fenwick’s Colony, he had already sold large tracts of land to fellow Englishmen, and he named the area West Fenwick. He was not yet aware that there were already European settlements here along the Delaware River. The plantations owned by the Swedes and Finns in West Fenwick Township which pre-dated Fenwick’s arrival at Obisquahassit, Finns Town and in the Church Town area, reluctantly acknowledged John Fenwick as the new Lord Proprietor. To insure possession of their tracts of land, they signed quit claims to Fenwick in consideration of a yearly rental payment.

A series of financial, legal, and political difficulties followed John Fenwick from England, as well as a couple of imprisonments in America; so by age 65 John Fenwick was in declining health. Those four factors caused Fenwick to convey all his right, title and interest in West Jersey, except for 150,000 acres, to William Penn on March 23, 1682. Fenwick died in 1683.

=== After Fenwick's Colony ===
In 1701 West Fenwick was renamed Penns Neck Township in honor of the new Proprietor, William Penn. On July 10, 1721, Penns Neck was divided into Upper and Lower Penns Neck. The Township was incorporated in 1798 as one of New Jersey’s original group of 104 townships. The township was renamed Pennsville Township based on the results of a referendum held on November 2, 1965.

Pennsville became a resort destination because of two riverfront resort hotels: The Silver Grove Hotel in 1851 and the River View Hotel in 1883. Both waterfront properties were located right next to each other in Pennsville. In 1908 a new resort community of Fenton’s Beach was developed at Deep Water Point. In 1914, the Silver Grove Hotel owner purchased the River View Hotel to create Riverview Beach Park. In 1922, an adjoining farm was purchased, and the Park expanded again. Thousands would come by the Wilson Line ferry to the park each day from May to September. In 1916, the DuPont Company bought the Fenton's Beach resort community and established the DuPont Dye Works. In 1929 the Deepwater Generating Station was built. In 1951 the Delaware Memorial Bridge nearby Pennsville linking New Jersey and Delaware was opened.

In 1971, a sanitary landfill in Pennsville was registered with the New Jersey Department of Environmental Protection. It operated until April 1988. It was formally closed and emptied in 2005 and 2006.

== Geography ==
According to the U.S. Census Bureau, the township has a total area of 24.58 square miles (63.66 km^{2}), including 21.27 square miles (55.08 km^{2}) of land and 3.31 square miles (8.58 km^{2}) of water (13.48%).

Pennsville (with a 2020 census population of 12,043) is an unincorporated community and census-designated place (CDP) area located within Pennsville Township.

Other unincorporated communities, localities and places located partially or completely within the township include Cedar Crest, Churchtown, Central Park, Deepwater, Fort Mott, Glenside, Harrisonville, Penn Beach, and Valley Park.

The Salem River flows along the township's eastern and southern boundaries.

The township borders the Salem County municipalities of Carneys Point Township, Elsinboro Township, Mannington Township, and Salem. Pennsville Township also borders a section of New Castle County, Delaware, which is one of only two points of land east of the Delaware River that are within the state of Delaware, the other being on Artificial Island in Lower Alloways Creek Township.

== Demographics ==
Historical population
| Census | Pop. | Note | %± |
|---|---|---|---|
| 1810 | 1,163 | | — |
| 1820 | 1,158 | | −0.4% |
| 1830 | 993 | | −14.2% |
| 1840 | 1,219 | | 22.8% |
| 1850 | 1,429 | | 17.2% |
| 1860 | 1,506 | | 5.4% |
| 1870 | 1,472 | | −2.3% |
| 1880 | 1,334 | | −9.4% |
| 1890 | 1,280 | | −4.0% |
| 1900 | 1,424 | | 11.3% |
| 1910 | 1,544 | | 8.4% |
| 1920 | 2,149 | | 39.2% |
| 1930 | 2,933 | | 36.5% |
| 1940 | 5,113 | | 74.3% |
| 1950 | 7,376 | | 44.3% |
| 1960 | 10,417 | | 41.2% |
| 1970 | 13,296 | | 27.6% |
| 1980 | 13,848 | | 4.2% |
| 1990 | 13,794 | | −0.4% |
| 2000 | 13,194 | | −4.3% |
| 2010 | 13,409 | | 1.6% |
| 2020 | 12,684 | | −5.4% |
| 2023 (est.) | 12,765 | ▲ | 0.6% |
Population sources: 1810–2000; 1810–1920 1840 1850–1870; 1850 1870 1880–1890; 1890–1910 1910–1930; 1940–2000 2000; 2010 2020

=== 2010 census ===
The 2010 United States census counted 13,409 people, 5,491 households, and 3,706 families in the township. The population density was 630.2 inhabitants per square mile (243.3/km^{2}). There were 5,914 housing units at an average density of 278.0 per square mile (107.3/km^{2}). The racial makeup was 94.68% (12,696) White, 1.54% (206) Black or African American, 0.23% (31) Native American, 1.42% (190) Asian, 0.01% (2) Pacific Islander, 0.92% (124) from other races, and 1.19% (160) from two or more races. Hispanic or Latino of any race were 3.07% (411) of the population.

Of the 5,491 households, 27.4% had children under the age of 18; 50.6% were married couples living together; 11.9% had a female householder with no husband present and 32.5% were non-families. Of all households, 27.3% were made up of individuals and 11.6% had someone living alone who was 65 years of age or older. The average household size was 2.44 and the average family size was 2.97.

21.9% of the population were under the age of 18, 7.9% from 18 to 24, 25.0% from 25 to 44, 29.6% from 45 to 64, and 15.6% who were 65 years of age or older. The median age was 41.8 years. For every 100 females, the population had 95.1 males. For every 100 females ages 18 and older there were 92.1 males.

The Census Bureau's 2006–2010 American Community Survey showed that (in 2010 inflation-adjusted dollars) median household income was $58,153 (with a margin of error of +/− $4,425) and the median family income was $71,327 (+/− $6,934). Males had a median income of $53,166 (+/− $4,370) versus $42,054 (+/− $3,006) for females. The per capita income for the borough was $29,275 (+/− $1,740). About 7.0% of families and 9.8% of the population were below the poverty line, including 13.4% of those under age 18 and 5.9% of those age 65 or over.

=== 2000 census ===
As of the 2000 U.S. census, there were 13,194 people, 5,317 households, and 3,711 families residing in the township. The population density was 571.1 inhabitants per square mile (220.5/km^{2}). There were 5,623 housing units at an average density of 243.4 per square mile (94.0/km^{2}). The racial makeup of the township was 96.68% White, 0.96% African American, 0.16% Native American, 0.96% Asian, 0.02% Pacific Islander, 0.39% from other races, and 0.83% from two or more races. Hispanic or Latino of any race were 1.60% of the population.

There were 5,317 households, out of which 29.7% had children under the age of 18 living with them, 55.3% were married couples living together, 10.2% had a female householder with no husband present, and 30.2% were non-families. 26.0% of all households were made up of individuals, and 11.6% had someone living alone who was 65 years of age or older. The average household size was 2.47 and the average family size was 2.98.

In the township, the population was spread out, with 23.2% under the age of 18, 7.7% from 18 to 24, 28.2% from 25 to 44, 25.4% from 45 to 64, and 15.5% who were 65 years of age or older. The median age was 39 years. For every 100 females, there were 92.4 males. For every 100 females age 18 and over there were 90.1 males.

The median income for a household in the township was $47,250, and the median income for a family was $57,340. Males had a median income of $45,523 versus $29,629 for females. The per capita income for the township was $22,717. About 3.1% of families and 4.9% of the population were below the poverty line, including 5.2% of those under age 18 and 5.1% of those age 65 or over.

== Government ==
=== Local government ===
Pennsville Township is governed under the Township form of New Jersey municipal government, one of 141 (of the 564) municipalities in New Jersey that use this form, the second-most commonly used form of government in the state. The Township Committee is comprised of five members, who are elected directly by the voters at-large in partisan elections to serve three-year terms of office on a staggered basis, with either one or two seats coming up for election each year as part of the November general election in a three-year cycle. At an annual reorganization meeting, the Township Committee selects one of its members to serve as Mayor and another as Deputy Mayor.

As of 2024, the members of the Pennsville Township committee are Mayor Daniel J. Neu (R, term on committee ends December 31, 2025; term as mayor ends 2024), Deputy Mayor Scott Hourigan (R, term on committee ends 2025; term as deputy mayor ends 2024), John Dyer (R, 2026), Melissa Fitchett (R, 2026) and Peter E. Halter Sr. (R, 2024).

=== Federal, state, and county representation ===
Pennsville Township is located in the 2nd Congressional District and is part of New Jersey's 3rd state legislative district.

For the 119th United States Congress, New Jersey's 2nd congressional district is represented by Jeff Van Drew (R, Dennis Township). New Jersey is represented in the United States Senate by Democrats Cory Booker (Newark, term ends 2027) and Andy Kim (Moorestown, term ends 2031).

For the 2026–2027 session, the 3rd legislative district of the New Jersey Legislature is represented in the State Senate by John Burzichelli (D, Paulsboro) and in the General Assembly by David Bailey (D, Woodstown) and Heather Simmons (D, Glassboro).

Salem County is governed by a five-member Board of County Commissioners who are elected at-large to serve three-year terms of office on a staggered basis, with either one or two seats coming up for election each year. At an annual reorganization meeting held in the beginning of January, the board selects a Director and a Deputy Director from among its members. As of 2025, Salem County's Commissioners (with party, residence, and term-end year listed in parentheses) are:

Director Benjamin H. Laury (R, Elmer, 2027), Deputy Director Cordy Taylor (R, Oldmans Township, 2028), Paul Collier (R, Lower Alloways Creek, 2027), Ed Ramsey (R, Pittsgrove Township, 2026), and Daniel Timmerman (R, Elmer, 2028).

Constitutional officers elected on a countywide basis are: Clerk Dale A. Cross (R, Pennsville Township, 2029), Sheriff Charles M. Miller (R, Salem, 2027) and Surrogate Gordon J. Ostrum Jr. (R, Pilesgrove Township, 2030).

=== Politics ===
As of March 2011, there were a total of 9,062 registered voters in Pennsville Township, of which 2,572 (28.4% vs. 30.6% countywide) were registered as Democrats, 1,797 (19.8% vs. 21.0%) were registered as Republicans and 4,686 (51.7% vs. 48.4%) were registered as Unaffiliated. There were 7 voters registered as Libertarians or Greens. Among the township's 2010 Census population, 67.6% (vs. 64.6% in Salem County) were registered to vote, including 86.5% of those ages 18 and over (vs. 84.4% countywide).

Gubernatorial election results for Pennsville Township
| Year | Republican | | Democratic | | Third party(ies) | |
| Year | No. | % | No. | % | No. | % |
|---|---|---|---|---|---|---|
| 2025 | 2,749 | 61.03% | 1,724 | 38.28% | 31 | 0.69% |
| 2021 | 2,698 | 69.00% | 1,172 | 29.97% | 40 | 1.02% |
| 2017 | 1,843 | 53.78% | 1,381 | 40.30% | 203 | 5.92% |
| 2013 | 2,848 | 72.21% | 1,007 | 25.53% | 89 | 2.26% |
| 2009 | 1,959 | 47.26% | 1,688 | 40.72% | 498 | 12.01% |
| 2005 | 1,997 | 45.45% | 2,192 | 49.89% | 205 | 4.67% |

In the 2012 presidential election, Republican Mitt Romney received 53.4% of the vote (3,175 cast), ahead of Democrat Barack Obama with 44.6% (2,651 votes), and other candidates with 2.0% (116 votes), among the 5,999 ballots cast by the township's 9,285 registered voters (57 ballots were spoiled), for a turnout of 64.6%. In the 2008 presidential election, Republican John McCain received 3,204 votes (48.7% vs. 46.6% countywide), ahead of Democrat Barack Obama with 3,129 votes (47.6% vs. 50.4%) and other candidates with 153 votes (2.3% vs. 1.6%), among the 6,576 ballots cast by the township's 9,291 registered voters, for a turnout of 70.8% (vs. 71.8% in Salem County). In the 2004 presidential election, Republican George W. Bush received 3,547 votes (54.3% vs. 52.5% countywide), ahead of Democrat John Kerry with 2,859 votes (43.8% vs. 45.9%) and other candidates with 81 votes (1.2% vs. 1.0%), among the 6,528 ballots cast by the township's 9,041 registered voters, for a turnout of 72.2% (vs. 71.0% in the whole county).

United States presidential election results for Pennsville Township 2024 2020 2016 2012 2008 2004
| Year | Republican | | Democratic | | Third party(ies) | |
| Year | No. | % | No. | % | No. | % |
|---|---|---|---|---|---|---|
| 2024 | 4,093 | 63.88% | 2,206 | 34.43% | 108 | 1.69% |
| 2020 | 4,311 | 61.38% | 2,540 | 36.16% | 173 | 2.46% |
| 2016 | 3,973 | 64.40% | 1,952 | 31.64% | 244 | 3.96% |
| 2012 | 3,175 | 53.43% | 2,651 | 44.61% | 116 | 1.95% |
| 2008 | 3,204 | 49.40% | 3,129 | 48.24% | 153 | 2.36% |
| 2004 | 3,547 | 54.68% | 2,859 | 44.07% | 81 | 1.25% |

In the 2013 gubernatorial election, Republican Chris Christie received 72.2% of the vote (2,848 cast), ahead of Democrat Barbara Buono with 25.5% (1,007 votes), and other candidates with 2.3% (89 votes), among the 3,979 ballots cast by the township's 9,134 registered voters (35 ballots were spoiled), for a turnout of 43.6%. In the 2009 gubernatorial election, Republican Chris Christie received 1,959 votes (46.9% vs. 46.1% countywide), ahead of Democrat Jon Corzine with 1,688 votes (40.4% vs. 39.9%), Independent Chris Daggett with 424 votes (10.1% vs. 9.7%) and other candidates with 75 votes (1.8% vs. 2.0%), among the 4,181 ballots cast by the township's 9,259 registered voters, yielding a 45.2% turnout (vs. 47.3% in the county).

United States Senate election results for Pennsville Township1
| Year | Republican | | Democratic | | Third party(ies) | |
| Year | No. | % | No. | % | No. | % |
|---|---|---|---|---|---|---|
| 2024 | 3,865 | 60.89% | 2,339 | 36.85% | 144 | 2.27% |
| 2018 | 3,122 | 63.55% | 1,530 | 31.14% | 261 | 5.31% |
| 2012 | 2,656 | 46.51% | 2,929 | 51.30% | 125 | 2.19% |
| 2006 | 2,149 | 48.84% | 2,080 | 47.27% | 171 | 3.89% |

United States Senate election results for Pennsville Township2
| Year | Republican | | Democratic | | Third party(ies) | |
| Year | No. | % | No. | % | No. | % |
|---|---|---|---|---|---|---|
| 2020 | 4,066 | 58.71% | 2,583 | 37.30% | 276 | 3.99% |
| 2014 | 2,046 | 55.81% | 1,451 | 39.58% | 169 | 4.61% |
| 2013 | 1,141 | 66.18% | 554 | 32.13% | 29 | 1.68% |
| 2008 | 2,711 | 42.77% | 3,326 | 52.48% | 301 | 4.75% |

== Education ==
Students in public school for pre-kindergarten through twelfth grade attend the Pennsville School District. As of the 2021–22 school year, the district, comprised of five schools, had an enrollment of 1,809 students and 166.9 classroom teachers (on an FTE basis), for a student–teacher ratio of 10.8:1. Schools in the district (with 2020–21 enrollment data from the National Center for Education Statistics) are Valley Park Elementary School with 340 students in grades preK-1, Central Park Elementary School with 237 students in grades 2-3, Penn Beach Elementary School with 302 students in grades 4-5, Pennsville Middle School with 450 students in grades 6-8 and Pennsville Memorial High School with 450 students in grades 9-12.

A private school also operates in Pennsville. Guardian Angels Regional School is a K-8 school that operates under the auspices of the Roman Catholic Diocese of Camden. Its PreK-3 campus is in Gibbstown while its 4-8 campus is in Paulsboro.

== Transportation ==
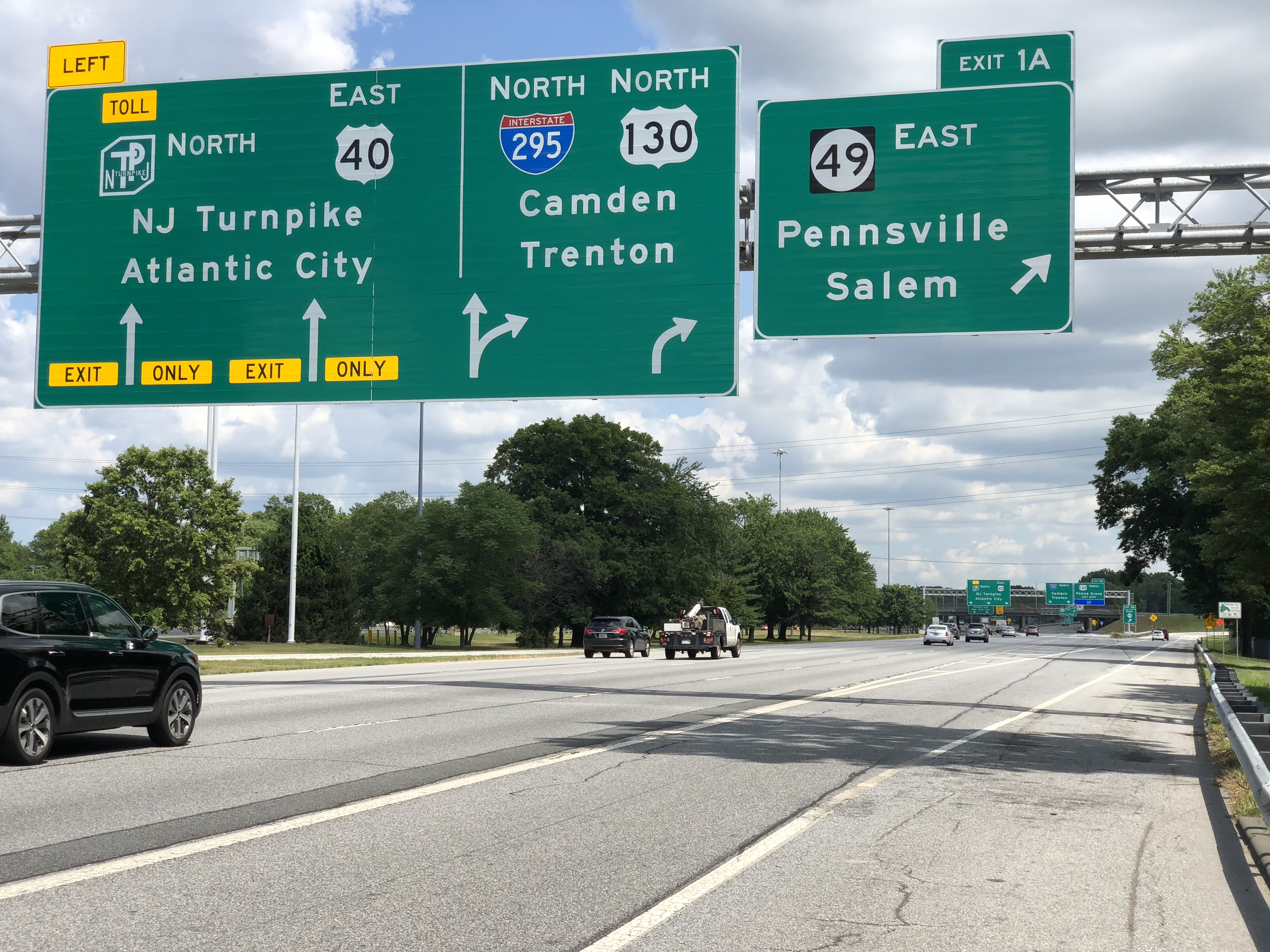
The junction of Interstate 295, U.S. Route 40, U.S. Route 130, Route 49, and the New Jersey Turnpike in Pennsville Township

=== Roads and highways ===
As of May 2010, the township had a total of 90.71 miles (145.98 km) of roadways, of which 73.02 miles (117.51 km) were maintained by the municipality, 7.33 miles (11.80 km) by Salem County, 8.99 miles (14.47 km) by the New Jersey Department of Transportation, 0.95 miles (1.53 km) by the Delaware River and Bay Authority and 0.42 miles (0.68 km) by the New Jersey Turnpike Authority.

Pennsville houses county, state, U.S., Interstates and toll expressways, which all converge at the northern part of the township near Deepwater. The southern terminus of U.S. Route 130 is in the township. Route 49 begins at the converging point and travels south for about 8.2 miles (13.2 km) through the center of town. Interstate 295 and U.S. Route 40 (multiplexed together) also pass through the north which houses Exit 1 along I-295 and which is also the Delaware Memorial Bridge that connects to the state of Delaware. In addition, the New Jersey Turnpike begins where Routes 49, 40, 130 and 295 all intersect with one another, with the creation of a roadway from Pennsville to Woodbridge Township being the initial goal when the New Jersey Turnpike Authority was created in 1948. Despite the Turnpike's southern end being in the township, Exit 1 is officially located in neighboring Carneys Point Township. The only major county road that travels through is County Road 551.

=== Public transportation ===
NJ Transit offers bus service to and from Philadelphia on the 402 route, and local service on the 468 routes.

== Notable people ==
People who were born in, residents of, or otherwise closely associated with Pennsville Township include:

- Kenneth A. Black Jr. (1932–2019), politician who served in the New Jersey General Assembly from District 3A from 1968 to 1974
- Paul Anthony Ciancia (born 1990), convicted for the 2013 Los Angeles International Airport shooting
- Gene Foster (born 1942), professional football linebacker who played for the San Diego Chargers from 1965 to 1970
- Daniel Garrison (1782–1851), member of the United States House of Representatives from New Jersey from 1823 to 1827
- Thomas A. Pankok (1931–2022), politician who represented the 3rd Legislative District in the New Jersey General Assembly from 1982 to 1986
- Dave Romansky (1938–2024), Olympic race walker
- Ritch Shydner (born 1951), writer, producer and actor
- Chris Widger (born 1971), Major League Baseball catcher and World Series Champion
- Mike Widger (1948–2016), linebacker who played in the Canadian Football League for the Montreal Alouettes and Ottawa Rough Riders
- Norm Willey (1927–2011), defensive lineman who played in the National Football League for the Philadelphia Eagles and then taught and coached football at Pennsville Memorial High School after retiring
