= Delaware Breakwater Range Rear Light =

- Location: Northwest of Lewes, Delaware
- Coordinates: 38°47′23″N 75°10′10″W

Tower
- Construction: Iron
- Shape: Hexagonal skeleton tower

Light
- First lit: 1881
- Deactivated: 1918
- Focal height: 103 feet (31 m)
- Lens: third order Fresnel Lens

The Delaware Breakwater Range Rear Light (also known as the Green Hill Light) was a lighthouse west of Lewes, Delaware. It was made obsolete by the shifting of Cape Henlopen and was disassembled and moved to Florida to become the Boca Grande Entrance Range Rear Light.

== History ==
This light was erected in 1881 to form a range to guide ships around Cape Henlopen and into the relatively sheltered area behind it, which was also protected by the Delaware Breakwater. A typical skeletal tower of the period was constructed near Lewes on the shore of Delaware Bay and equipped with a third order Fresnel lens. A wooden keeper's dwelling was also constructed; this was supplemented with a second dwelling for an assistant in 1910, built of concrete. The original house was sold and eventually burned. Extensive ornamental gardens were planted on the grounds in 1901.

The original front light was the Delaware Breakwater Range Front Light, a much older light situated at the west end of the breakwater as originally constructed; in 1903 this light was discontinued and the Delaware Breakwater East End Light was designated as the front light instead.

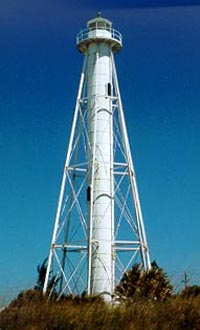
the light as re-erected in Florida

Cape Henlopen continued to shift, and in 1918 the range was eliminated and the rear light was extinguished. In 1919 it was dismantled, and in 1927 it was reassembled as the rear light of the Boca Grande Entrance Range on Gasparilla Island in Florida, where it still stands. At the original site the second dwelling survives, along with an oil house and a barn. The City of Lewes has considered restoration of the site as part of its trails system.
