= National Harbor of Refuge and Delaware Breakwater Harbor Historic District =

Historic district in Delaware, United States

- U.S. National Register of Historic Places
- U.S. Historic district
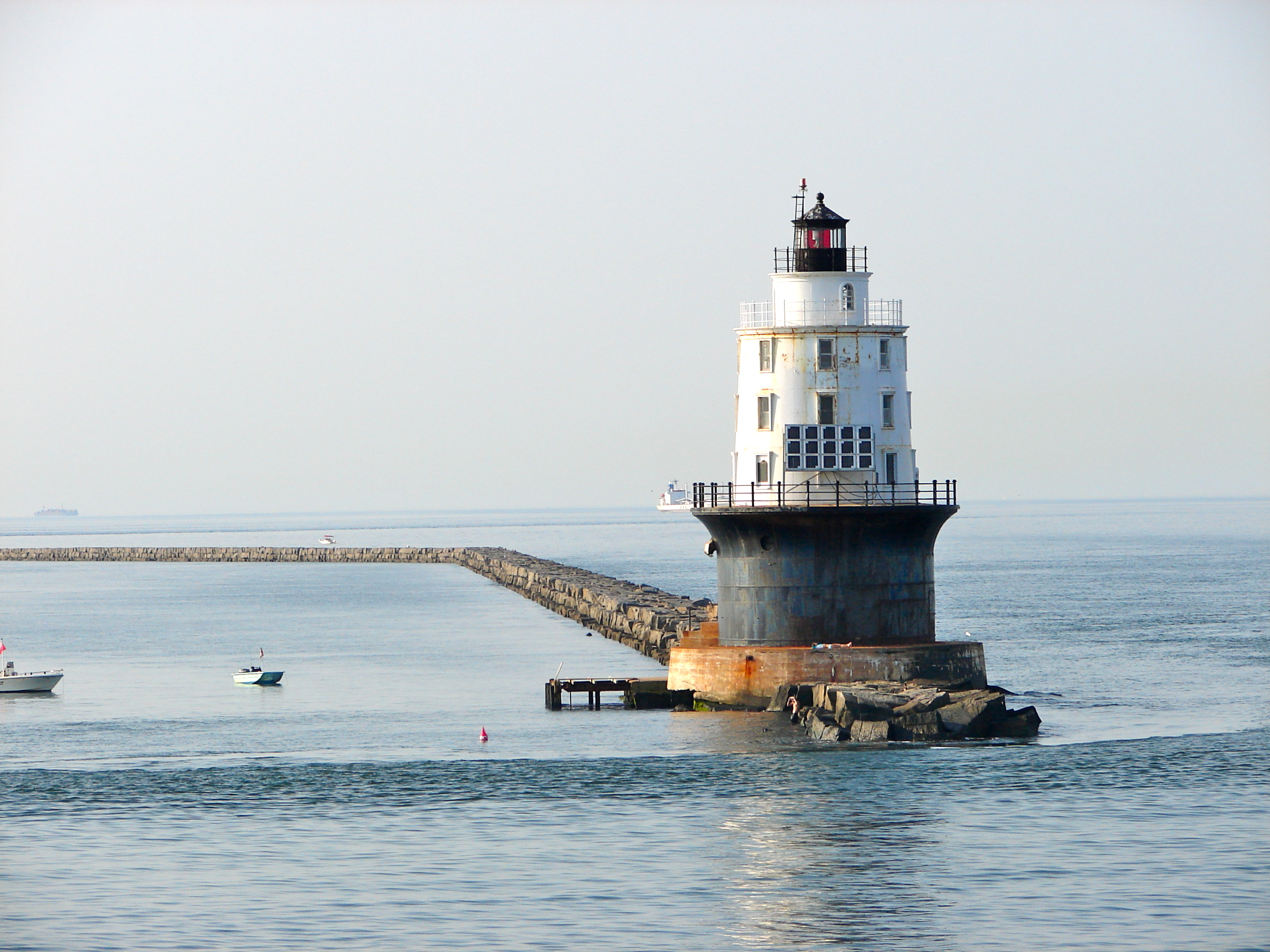

- Location within Delaware Location within the United States
- Location: Mouth of Delaware Bay at Cape Henlopen, Lewes, Delaware
- Coordinates: 38°47′59″N 75°6′27″W
- Architect: Strickland, William
- NRHP reference No.: 89000289
- Added to NRHP: March 27, 1989

The National Harbor of Refuge and Delaware Breakwater Historic District encompasses a series of seacoast breakwaters behind Cape Henlopen, Delaware, built between 1828 and 1898 to establish a shipping haven on a coastline that lacked safe harbors. The Harbor of Refuge is at the mouth of the Delaware Bay estuary where it opens into the Atlantic Ocean, at Lewes.

The district is almost entirely offshore, touching land only at the former United States Coast Guard station. It was added to the National Register of Historic Places in 1989.

== Delaware Breakwater ==
An 1822 study authorized by the United States Congress investigated the possibility of a haven at Cape Henlopen. Led by General Simon Bernard, Major Joseph Gilbert Totten and Commodore William Bainbridge, the committee recommended that a permanent harbor be created.

In 1826, William Strickland began to design the breakwater, which would be the first of its kind in the Western Hemisphere and the third in the world, after one in Cherbourg, France, and the Plymouth Breakwater at Plymouth, England. Work began in 1828 on what is now the inner breakwater, listed in its own right on the National Register as the Delaware Breakwater. These works consisted of a 2,100-foot (640 m) main breakwater and a 1,700-foot (520 m) icebreaker pier. Both were built of granite rubble from New Castle County, Delaware, with earlier portions using smaller stones from the Hudson Palisades. The breakwaters are 160 feet (49 m) wide at the base and 20 feet (6.1 m) at the top. The project used 835,000 tons of stone. Strickland also designed a lighthouse for the harbor, which was completed the next year.

The harbor was a success, but it soon became apparent that it was too small. During storms as many as 200 ships would seek refuge. Shoaling was also a problem. In 1877, a hurricane destroyed several ships in the harbor, and others that could not get into the harbor. To improve things, work began in 1883 to close the opening between the icebreaker and main breakwater, using the same stone as the original. This project rendered obsolete the Strickland lighthouse, which was replaced in 1885 by the present Delaware Breakwater East End Light. The work dragged on for 16 years, during which 70 sailors perished in the Great Blizzard of 1888. The breakwater closure was finally completed in 1898.

An iron pier was built beginning in 1871 by the U.S. Army Corps of Engineers and completed in 1882. The 1,700-foot (520 m) pier was designed to carry rail traffic directly out to ships in the harbor. The structure used iron screw piles with wood decking. The pier was later adapted for use by the U.S. Lifesaving Station and the quarantine station. The iron pier shafts remain visible in the harbor, a hazard to navigation.

== National Harbor of Refuge ==
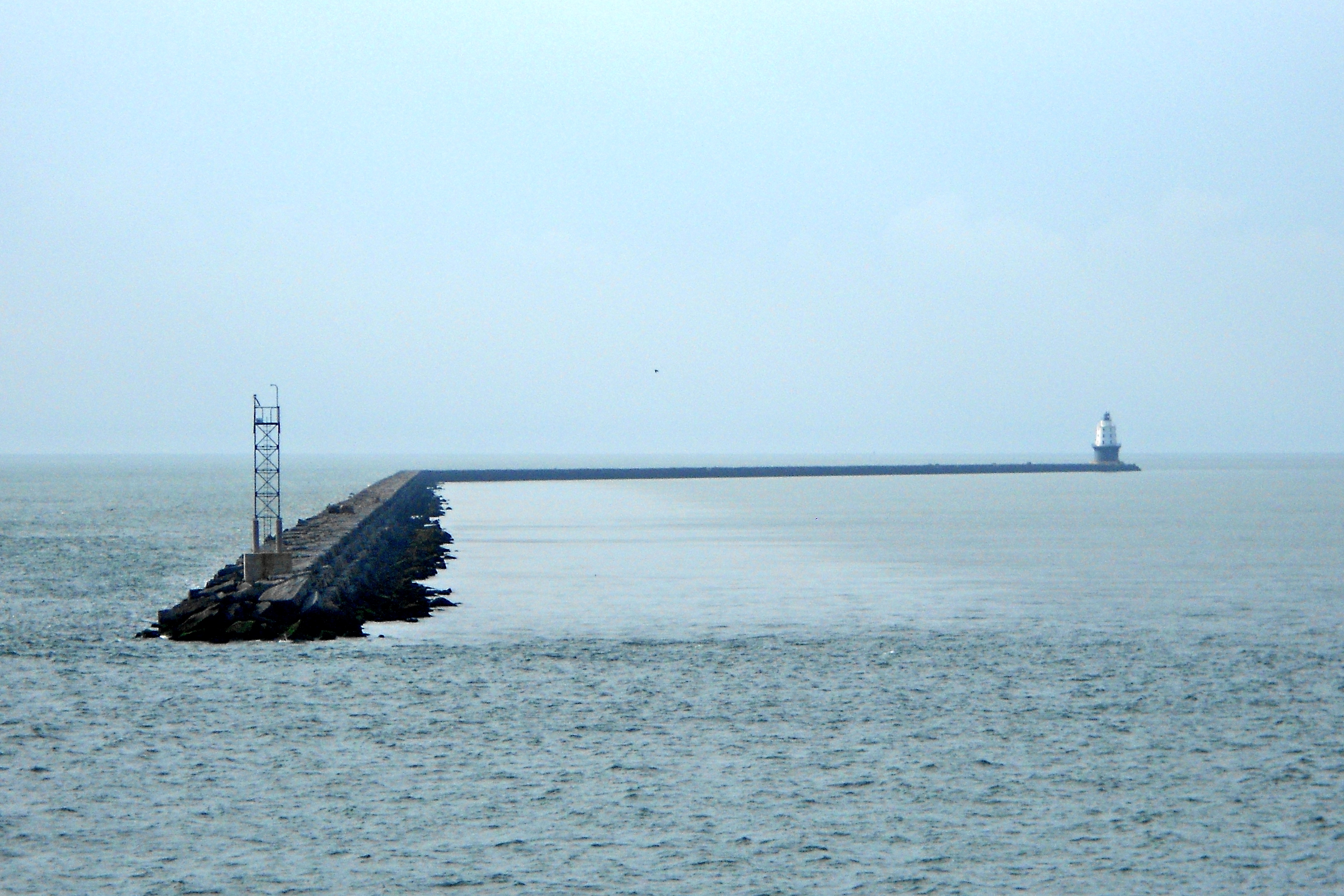
Outer harbor

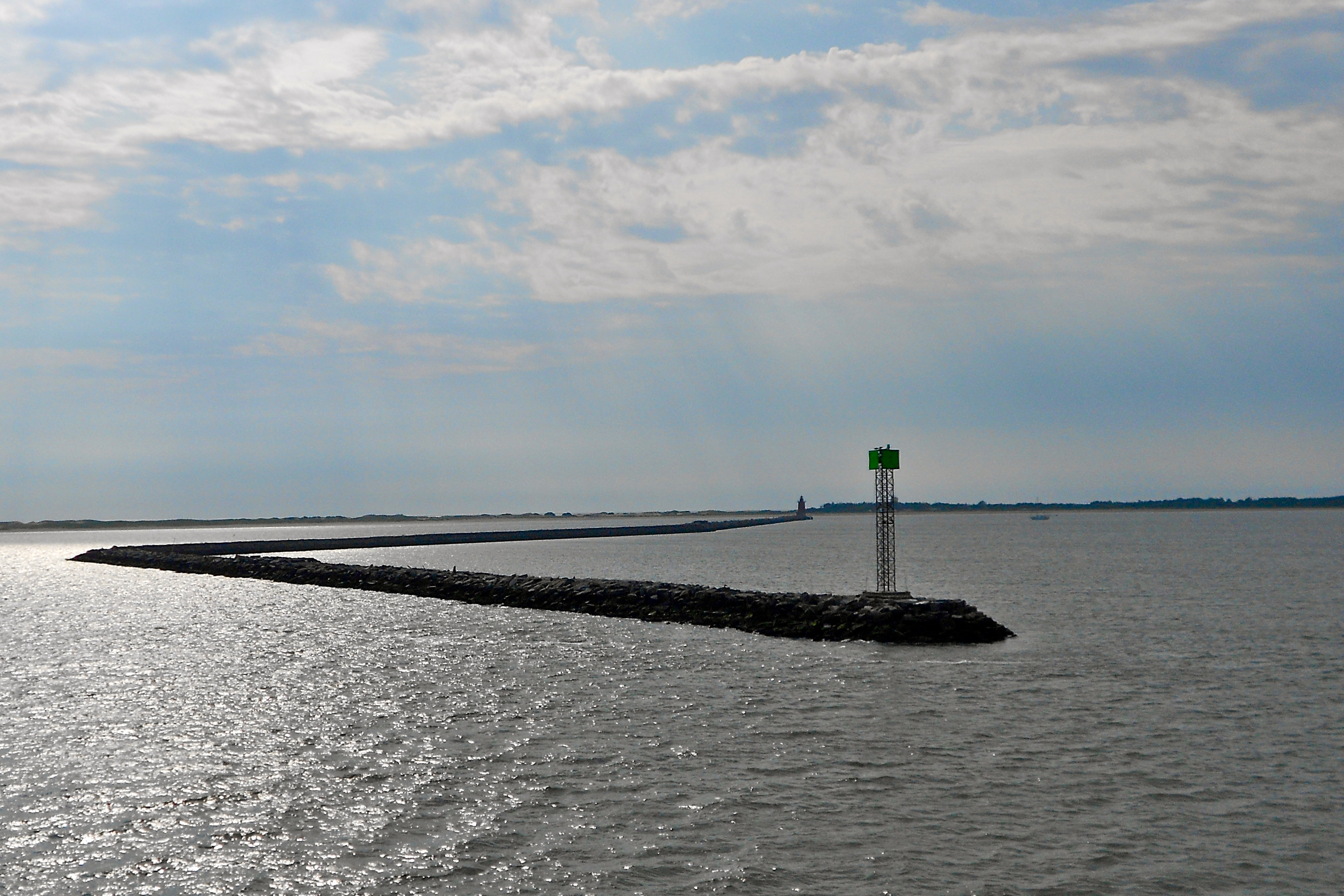
Inner harbor

In 1896 Congress authorized a new, larger program of breakwaters, the National Harbor of Refuge. Located 6,500 feet (2,000 m) to the north of the original breakwater on a shoal known as The Shears, the new breakwater used much larger stone. The dressed and fitted masonry used individual pieces of up to 13 tons. The new breakwater was 8,040 feet (2,450 m) long at low water and 40 feet (12 m) wide. Ten icebreaker piers were built 1,250 feet (380 m) to the north of dressed stone in a 1,300 feet (400 m) line. Compared with the earlier effort, steam-powered equipment allowed the use of larger stones and sped construction. The project cost $2,090,765.82 and was completed in 1901.

The first Harbor of Refuge Light was built on this breakwater and began operation in 1908. Damaged in 1920 by storms, it was replaced by the current structure in 1926. This light effectively replaced the 1767 Cape Henlopen Light, which was abandoned in 1924 and fell into the sea in 1926.

At certain places around the breakwater, the waters can be up to 70 feet deep to accommodate large ships that would anchor in the harbor.

== Coast Guard Station ==
The Lewes Coast Guard Station now functions as the Delaware River pilot's station. The station is a 2.5-story balloon-framed building, built in 1938 in Colonial Revival style. The principal facade faces the harbor with an enclosed porch supported by paired Tuscan columns. Shingle siding covers the station. An enclosed observation platform on the roof has a Chinese Chippendale railing, with adapted Palladian windows on all sides.
