= Cape Henlopen State Park =

State park in Delaware, United States

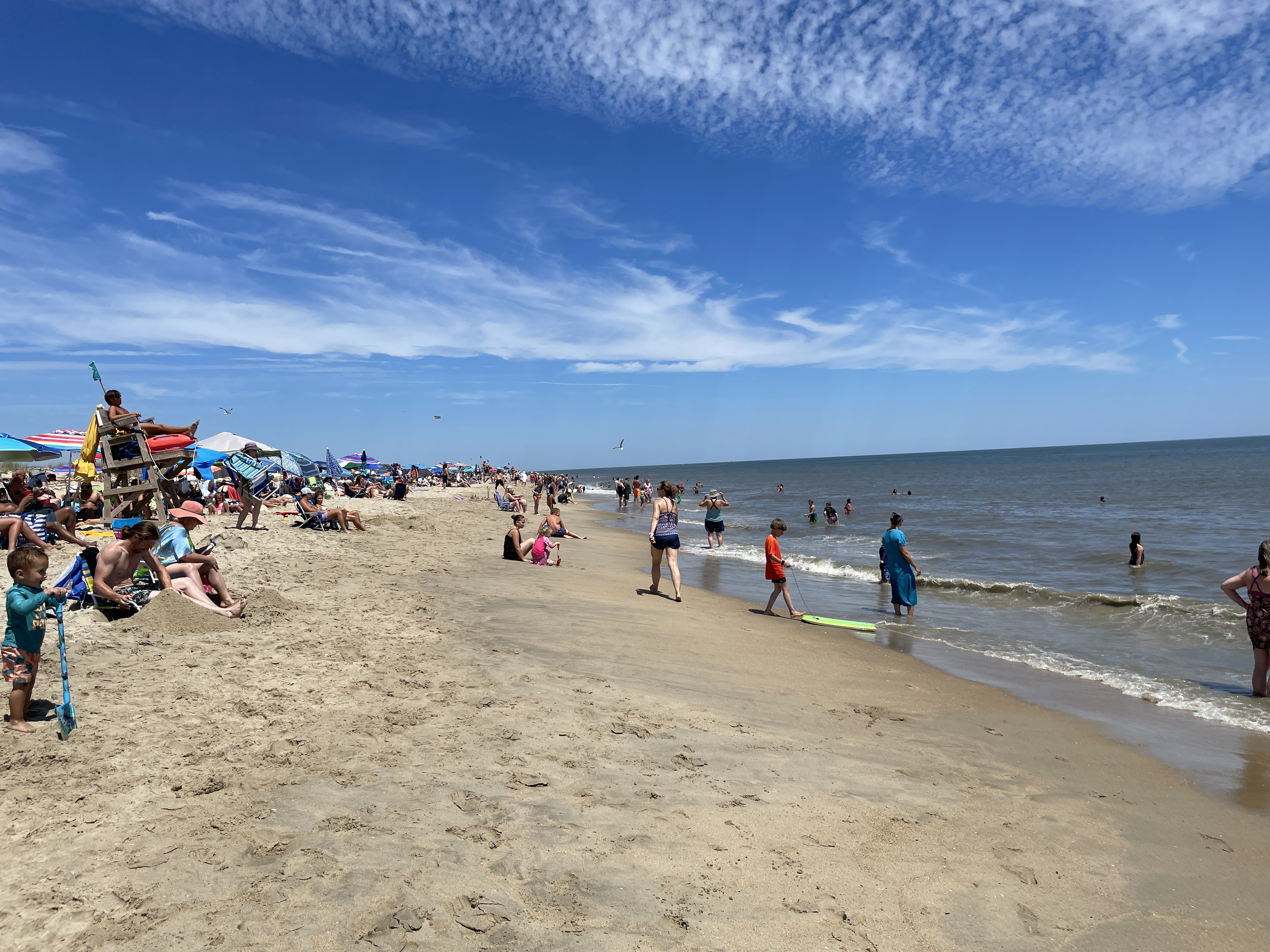
- Cape Henlopen State Park beach looking north

- Location within Delaware Location within the United States
- Location: Sussex County, Delaware, United States
- Nearest city: Lewes, Delaware
- Coordinates: 38°48′11″N 75°05′41″W
- Area: 5,450.81 acres (2,205.86 ha)
- Elevation: 7 ft (2.1 m)
- Established: 1964
- Administrator: Delaware Department of Natural Resources and Environmental Control
- Website: Official website

Cape Henlopen State Park is a Delaware state park on 5,450 acres (2,210 ha) on Cape Henlopen in Sussex County, Delaware, United States. William Penn made the beaches of Cape Henlopen one of the first public lands established in what has become the United States in 1682 with the declaration that Cape Henlopen would be for "the usage of the citizens of Lewes and Sussex County." Cape Henlopen State Park has a 24-hour and year-round fishing pier as well as campgrounds. The remainder of the park is only open from sunrise to sunset, and includes a bathhouse on the Atlantic Ocean, an area for surf-fishing, a disc golf course, and bicycle and walking paths. The beach at Herring Point is a popular surfing spot. The park is a stop on Delaware's Coastal Heritage Greenway.

== History ==
Cape Henlopen, on Delaware Bay, has long been a public use area although it did not officially become a Delaware state park until 1964. William Penn, the founder of Pennsylvania and early leader of Delaware, decreed that Cape Henlopen and its natural resources be set aside for the use and enjoyment of the citizens of the Delaware Colony. Penn's decree established Cape Henlopen as one of the first public use parcels of land in the Thirteen Colonies.

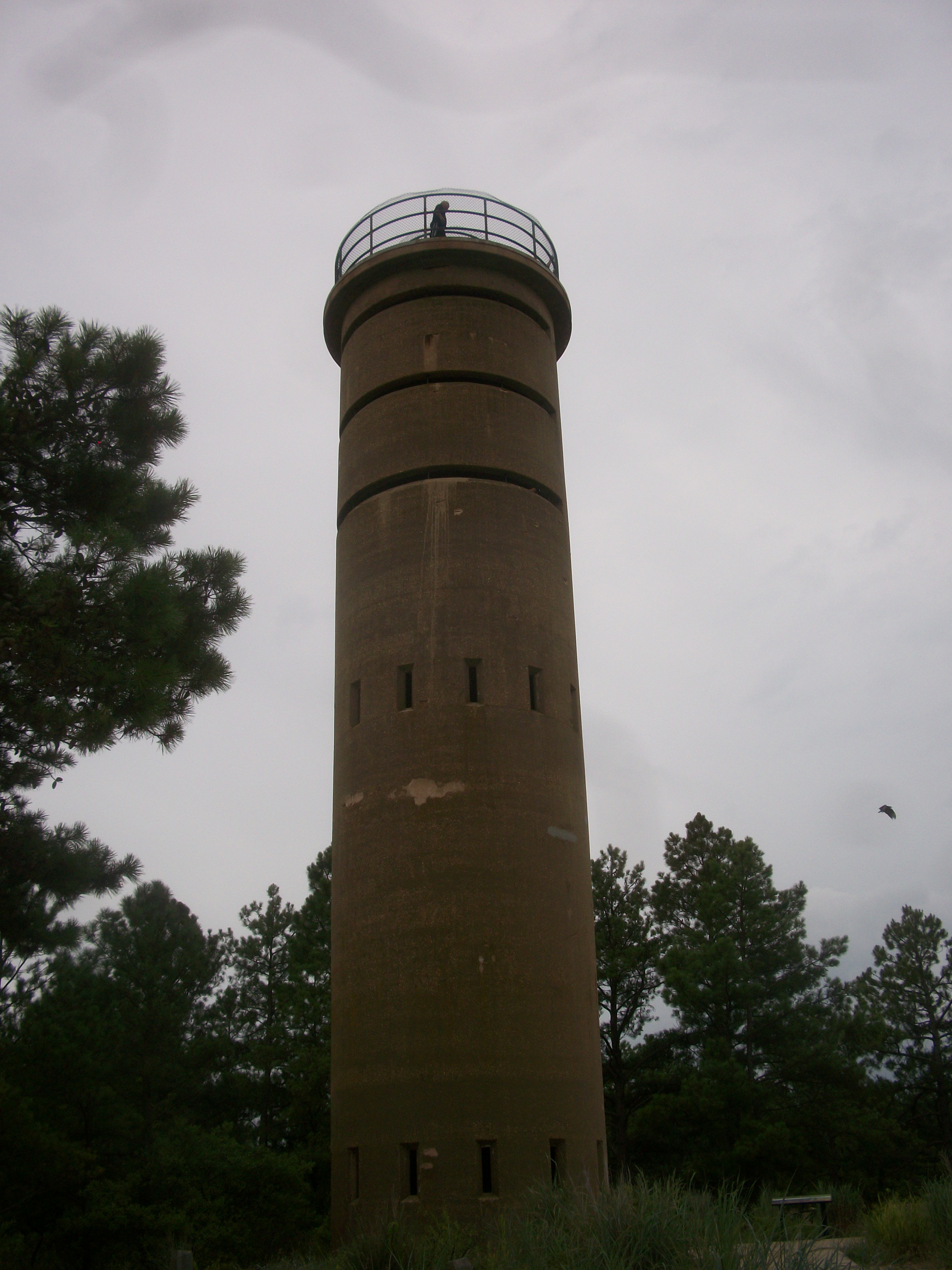
Restored World War II observation tower.

The cape was an important strategic location for the U.S. Navy and Army during the American Revolution, War of 1812, Civil War, World War I, and World War II. Cape Henlopen Light, the sixth lighthouse built on the Atlantic Coast, was constructed from 1767-1769. This lighthouse was in operation until 1924 when it was abandoned after it was extensively damaged in 1920 by a storm. The lighthouse now rests at the bottom of the Atlantic Ocean, after falling into the water on April 13, 1926.

A small gun platform was built by 1918 near the present site of Point Comfort parking lot. It was abandoned and removed prior to construction of Fort Miles.

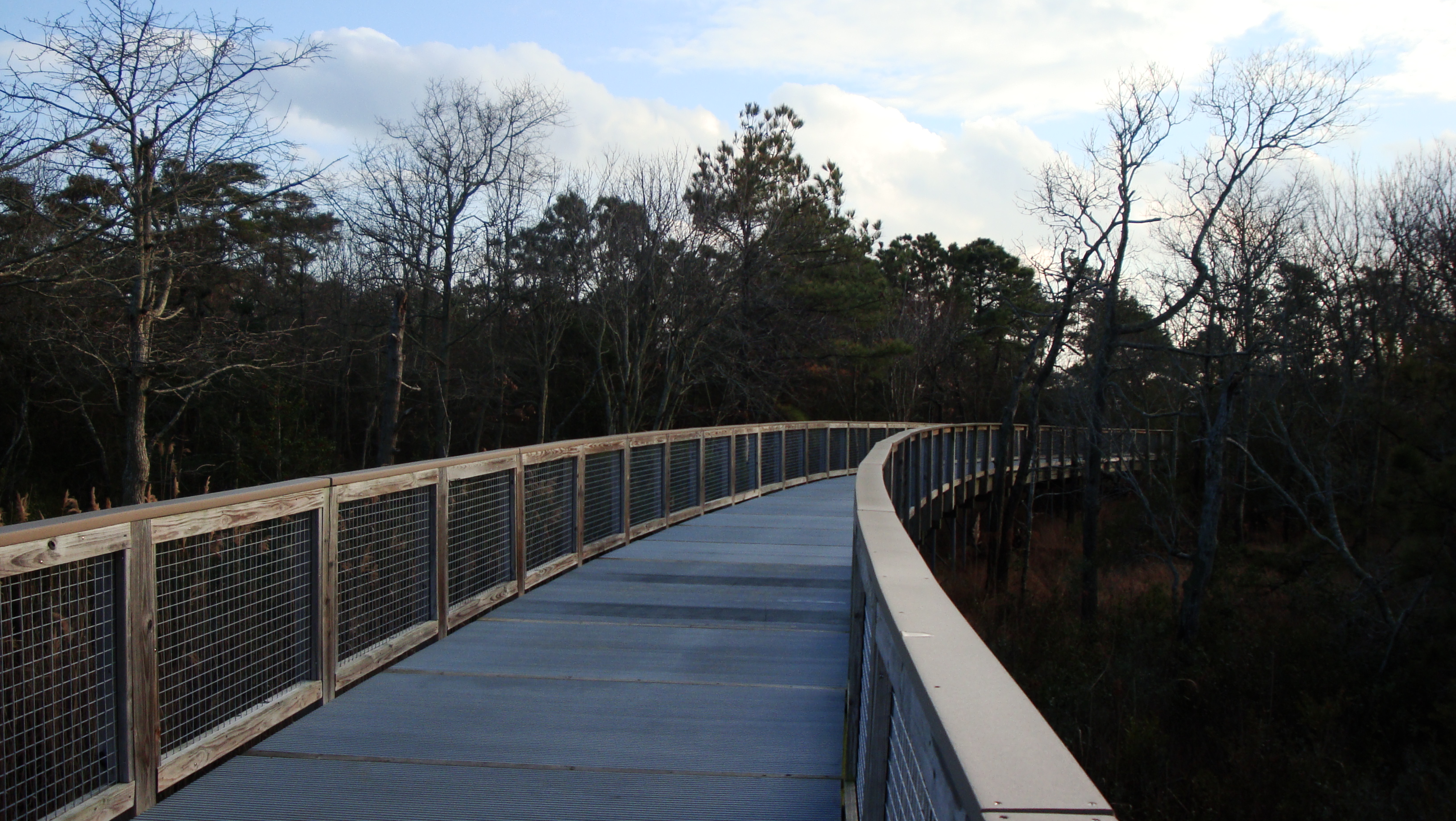
The view of and from Gordon Pond Trail

During World War II, the U.S. Army built Fort Miles at Cape Henlopen. Numerous bunkers, concrete observation towers and the pier built to accommodate the laying of mines on the harbor floor remain today. Within the park grounds are a handful of fire control towers from that era, as well as underground gun batteries (bunkers) which were to be used in conjunction with the towers against the eventuality of air attack. Off the coast on the bay side are two lighthouses: the Harbor of Refuge Light and the Delaware Breakwater East End Light.

== Wildlife ==
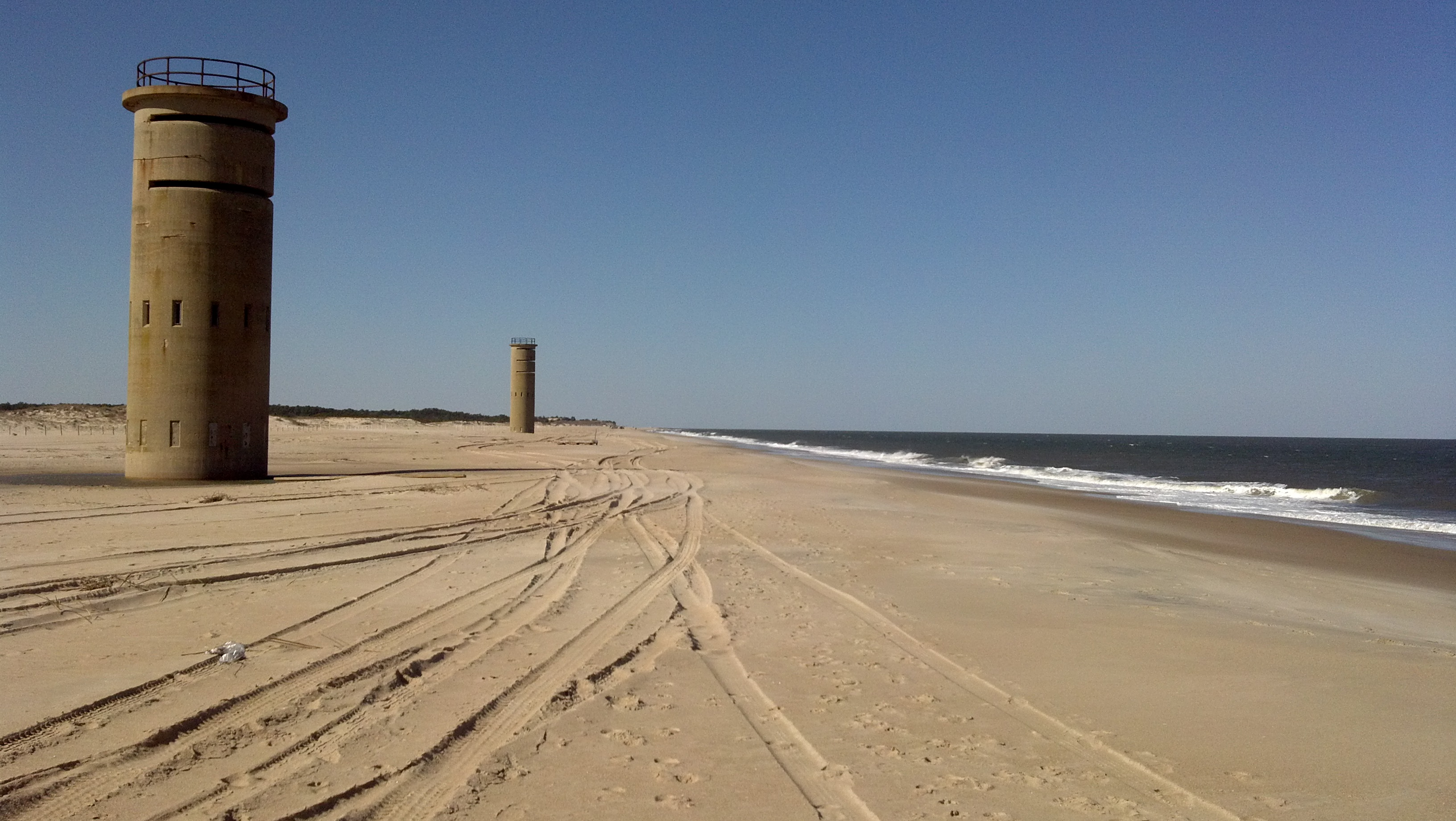
Gordon's Pond Beach

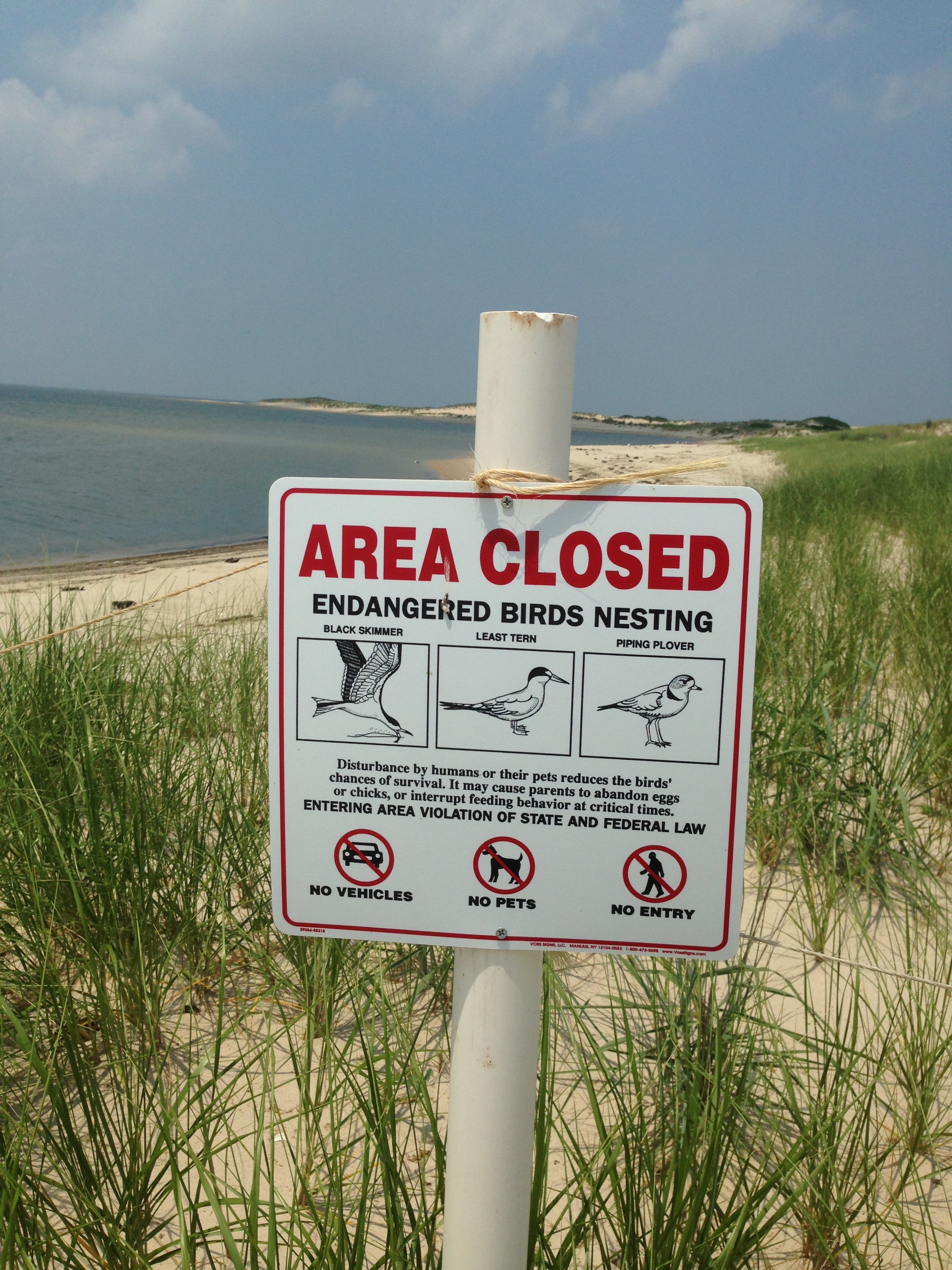
Area in Cape Henlopen State Park where endangered birds nest.

Cape Henlopen State Park is home to a vast array of wildlife, notably several species of shorebird. The black skimmer, least tern, and piping plover are all endangered species that are abundant within the park. Horseshoe crabs are also very common, especially in the Delaware Bay.

== Activities and amenities ==
The beach at Cape Henlopen State Park is open year-round. There are two beaches that are open to swimming at the park with lifeguard patrols between the Memorial and Labor Day weekends. A modern bath house with showers, changing rooms and a snack bar is located at the northern beach. North Shore Beach, the southern beach at Cape Henlopen State Park, is a popular beach among lesbians.

Cape Henlopen State Park has two facilities that are rented out for large group gatherings, a pavilion for picnics and the "Officer's Club" a remnant of the Fort Miles days. The 18 hole disc golf course and basketball courts are open year-round. Hunting is permitted during Delaware's designated hunting seasons in some parts of the park.

Cape Henlopen State Park is a popular fishing destination. Anglers may fish from the beach or from the fishing pier on Delaware Bay. A concessionaire operates the Cape Henlopen Fishing Center, a bait and tackle shop at the pier. It is open seven days a week May 15 - October 1. Visitors to the park may drive onto the beach for surf fishing after receiving a permit from the park authorities. Access over the dunes is open to pedestrians at all times.

The pine covered dunes of Cape Henlopen State Park are open to camping in some areas with over 150 campsite available. Most sites have running water. They are available from family camping March 1 - November 30. Reservations are required. A primitive campground is available for use by youth groups.

There are a variety of marked nature and hiking trails at the park, ranging from a beach to pine forests. Bicycles are another popular way to explore the park, and free bike loans are available (weather permitting).

Cape Henlopen State Park is the eastern terminus of the American Discovery Trail, which is the only transcontinental trail in the United States.

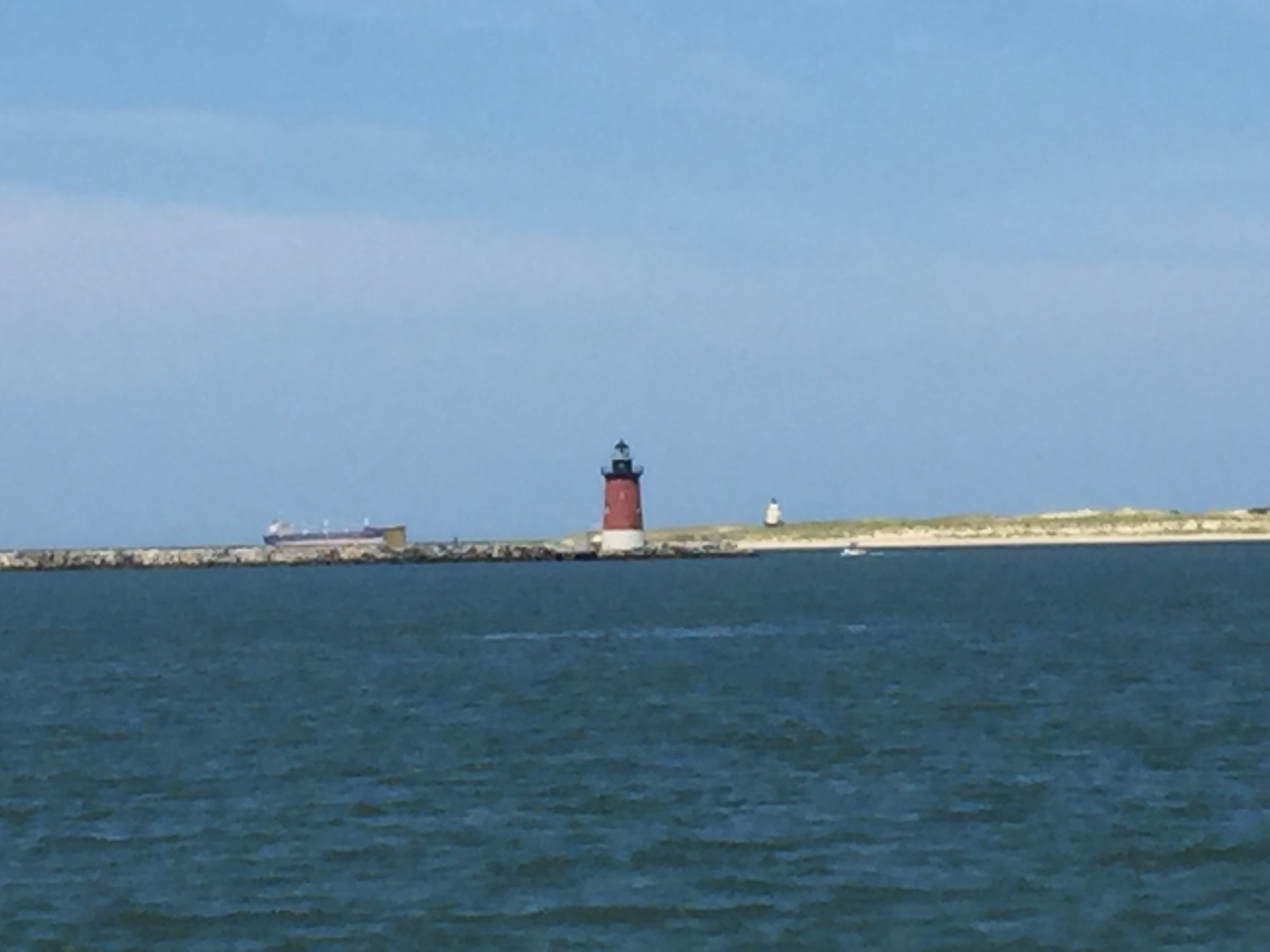
Cape Henlopen lighthouse

The park's Seaside Nature Center features marine aquariums and natural history exhibits about the park. Environmental education programs are offered year-round. The nature center also contains an auditorium and a gift shop. Programs offered include hayrides, guided nature walks and hikes, birding trips, preschool programs, school programs and children's vacation workshops.

== See also ==
- Junction and Breakwater Trail

Preceded by Northernmost point	Beaches of Delmarva	Succeeded by North Shores
