= Cape Henlopen Beacon =

Lighthouse in Delaware, United States

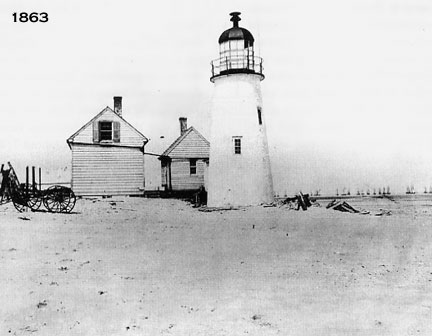
- Cape Henlopen Beacon in 1863 (USLHS/Archives)
- Location: Cape Henlopen, Delaware
- Coordinates: 38°47′25″N 75°4′50″W

Tower
- Constructed: 1825 (first tower); 1864 (second tower)
- Construction: stone (first) iron/wood (second)
- Height: 45 feet (14 m)
- Shape: conical tower (first) house on iron frame (second)

Light
- Deactivated: 1884
- Lens: reflector array/ fourth order Fresnel lens

The Cape Henlopen Beacon was a lighthouse built to mark the point of the cape, supplementing Cape Henlopen Light just to the south. It was decommissioned in 1884 and demolished.

== History ==
Cape Henlopen in historic times has been gradually extending to the northwest, so that the original lighthouse, Cape Henlopen Light, eventually was at a sufficient distance from the end of land to be ineffectual for marking the point. Therefore, in 1825, the Cape Henlopen Beacon was built as an auxiliary about a mile north of the older light. The Henlopen Beacon was a typical conical tower with an array of reflectors and oil lamps for the beacon. This light did not receive its own keeper's house until 1854, being maintained instead by the keeper of its neighbor to the south. This required the keeper to make multiple one mile journeys throughout the night. At the same time the keeper's house was constructed, the reflectors were replaced with a fourth order Fresnel lens. In 1864 the decrepit tower and house were replaced with a screw-pile structure, though unusually for the type it still sat entirely on land, at least at first. In 1875 a fog signal was added in a separate building.

The cape continued to move, and by the end of 1884 the ocean was lapping at the piles of the light, seriously threatening its existence. The lighthouse board decided against saving or moving the light, and in October of that year the light was discontinued and taken down, though the fog signal was maintained for another year until the signal at the Delaware Breakwater East End Light (which had been lit the previous year) was operational.
