= Fort Miles =

US Army fort near Lewes, Delaware (1942–1991)

- Part of Harbor Defenses of the Delaware
- Sussex County, Delaware

Site information
- Type: Fortification
- Owner: Public - State of Delaware
- Controlled by: Cape Henlopen State Park
- Open to the public: Yes
- Website: https://fortmilesmuseum.org/

Site history
- Built: 1940–1942
- Built by: U.S. Army Corps of Engineers
- In use: 1942–1991
- Materials: Reinforced concrete, earth
- Battles/wars: World War II

Garrison information
- Garrison: 21st Coast Artillery Regiment; 261st Coast Artillery Battalion; 52nd Coast Artillery (Railway); 113th Infantry Detachment
- Fort Miles Historic District
- U.S. National Register of Historic Places
- U.S. Historic district
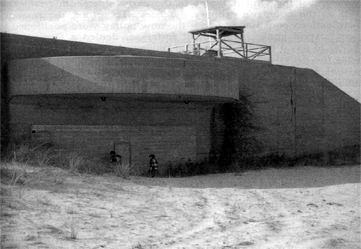
- Battery 519 at Fort Miles, Circa 1973

- Location within Delaware Location within the United States
- Location: Cape Henlopen State Park, Sussex County, Delaware, USA
- Nearest city: Lewes, Delaware
- Coordinates: 38°46′38″N 75°05′13″W
- Built: 1940
- NRHP reference No.: 04001076
- Added to NRHP: September 30, 2004

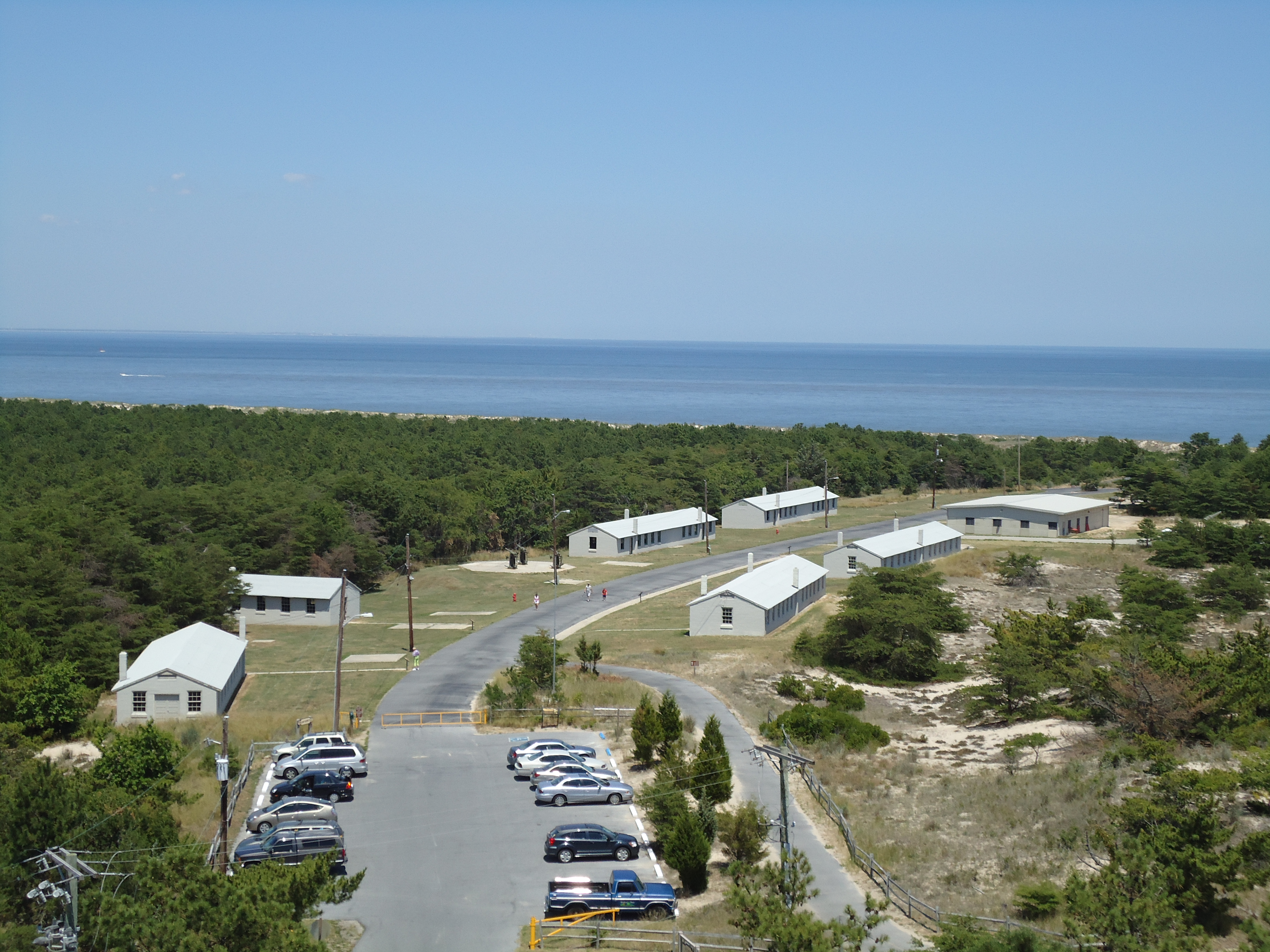
View of Fort Miles from Tower 7, which was one of the many fire control towers.

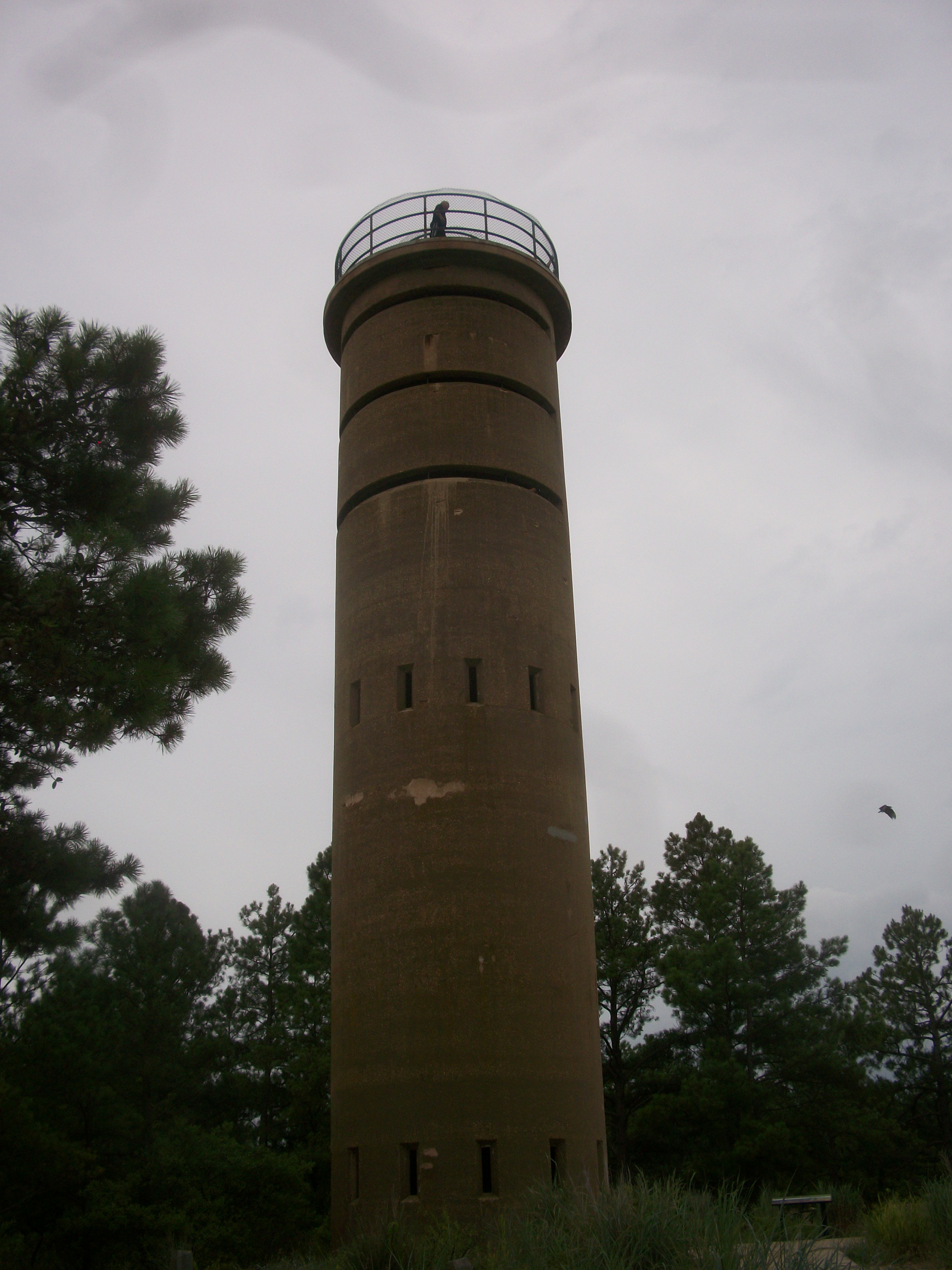
Restored World War II observation tower.

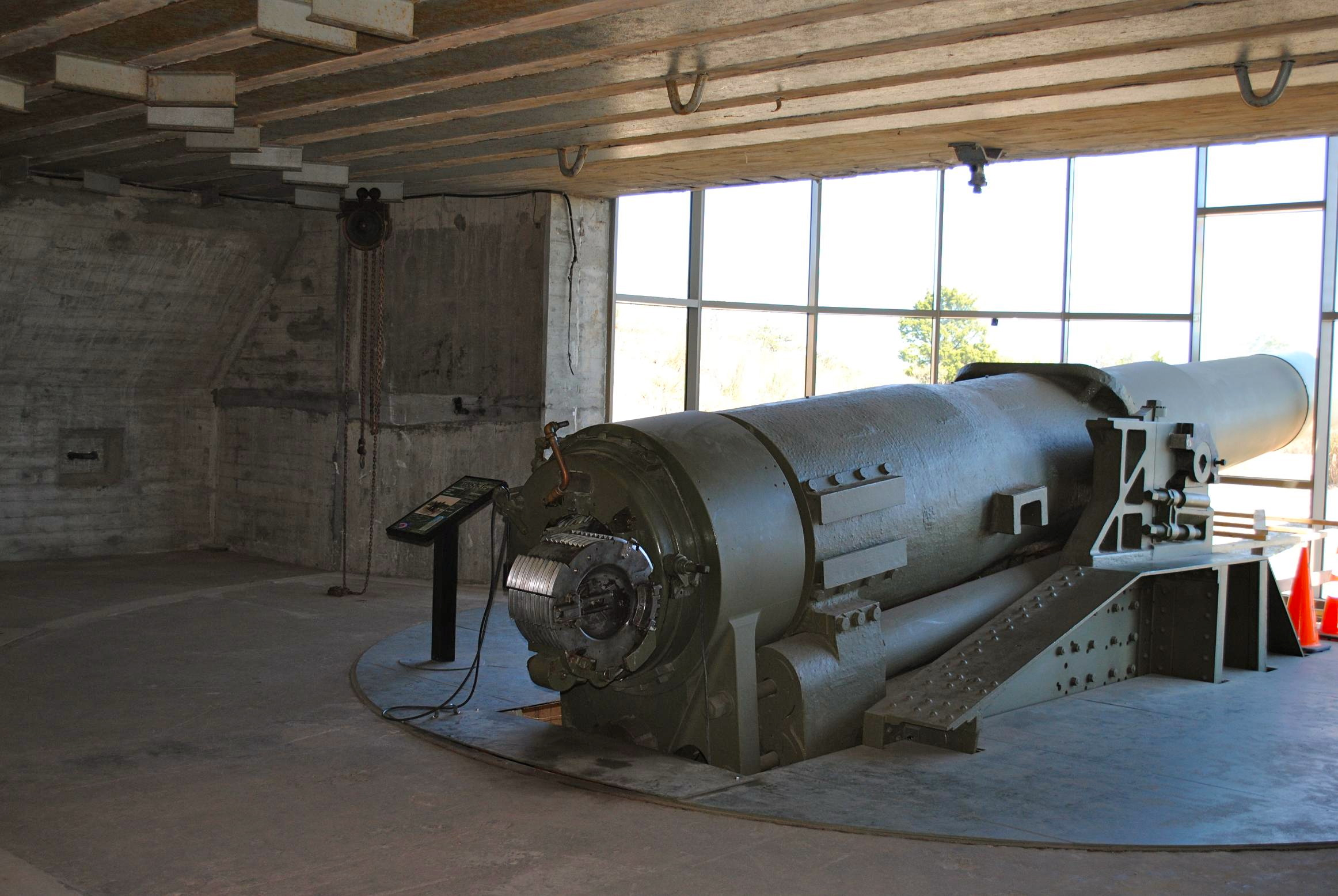
12-inch (305 mm) gun at Battery 519.

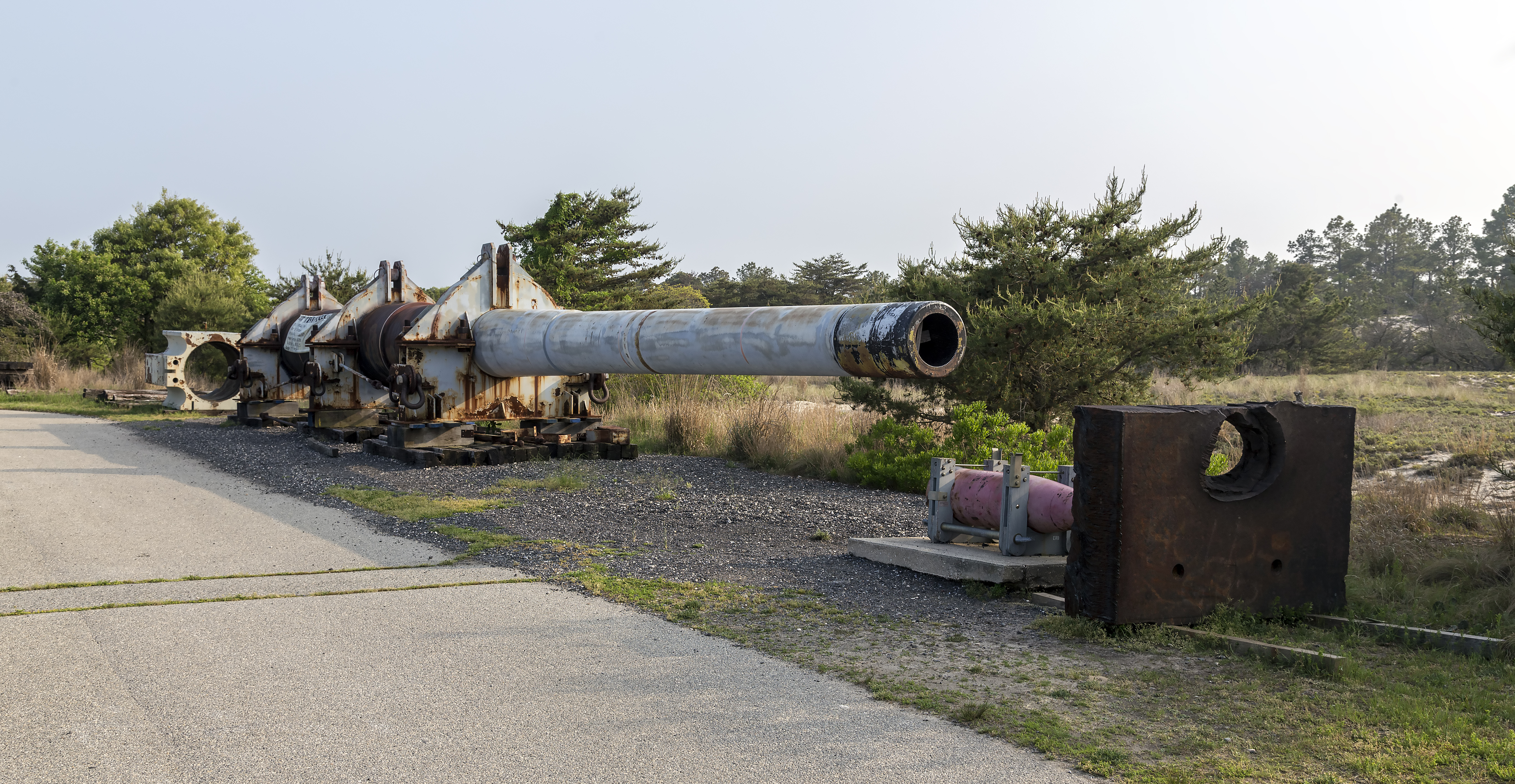
16-inch (406 mm) gun at Fort Miles in 2015.

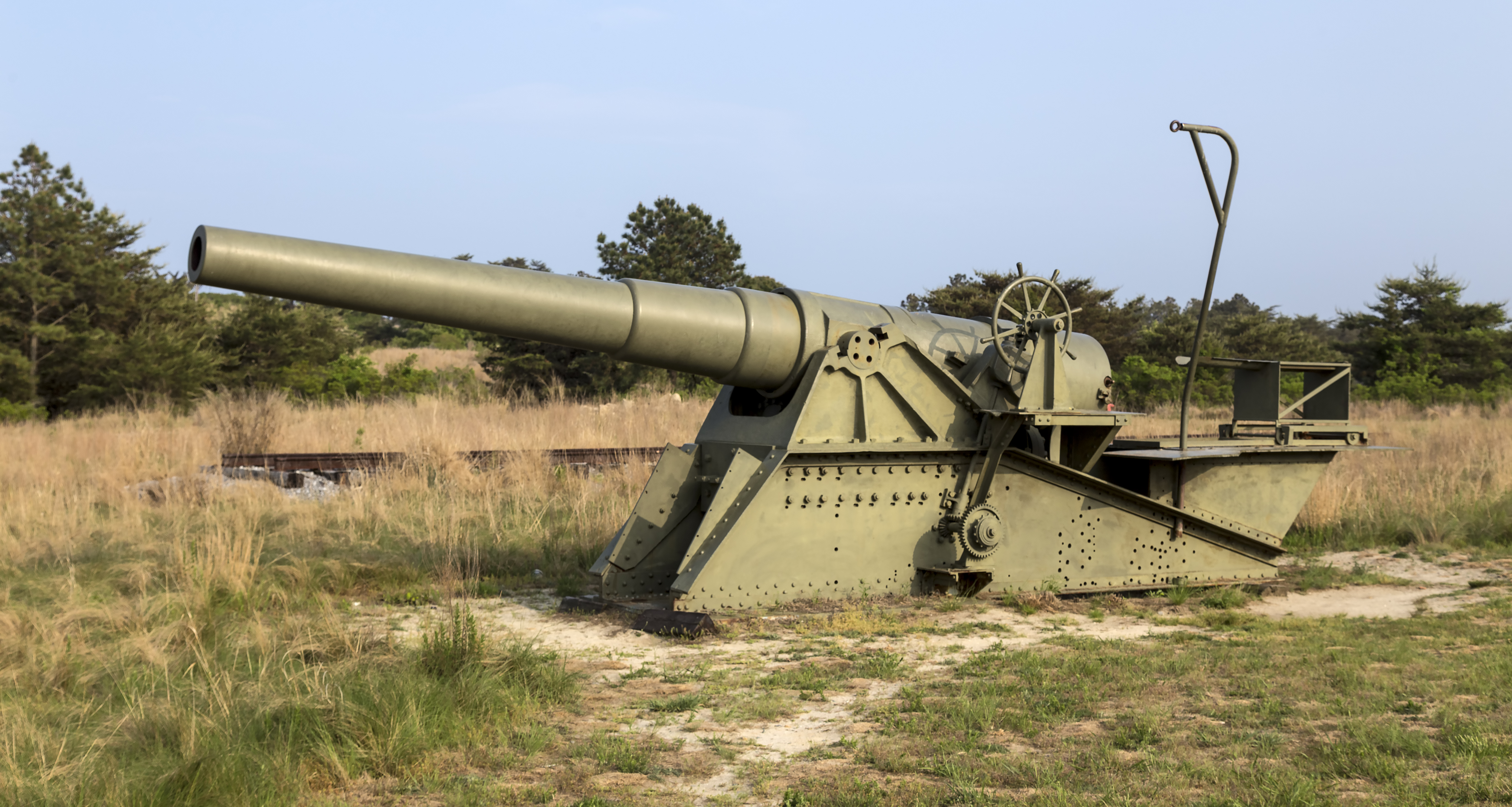
8-inch (203 mm) railway gun converted to 9.12-inch (232 mm) experimental gun.

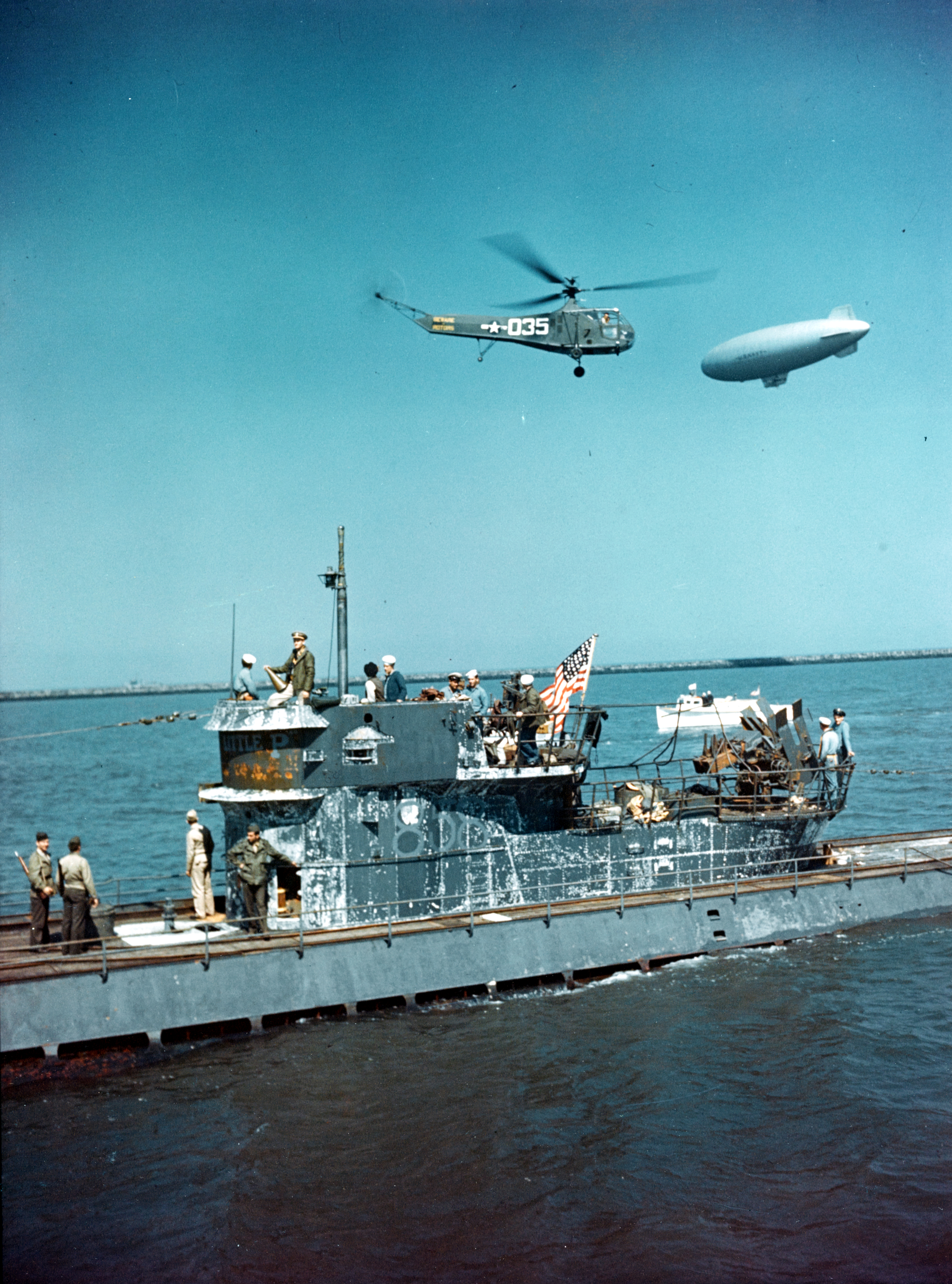
U-858 after her surrender in May 1945

Fort Miles was a United States Army World War II installation located on Cape Henlopen near Lewes, Delaware. Although funds to build the fort were approved in 1934, it was 1938 before construction began on the fort. On 3 June 1941 it was named for Lieutenant General Nelson A. Miles.

As the primary fort of the Harbor Defenses of the Delaware, it was built to defend Delaware Bay and the Delaware River and to protect domestic shipping from enemy fire between Cape May and Cape Henlopen, particularly from the German surface fleet. The fort also operated a controlled underwater minefield to prevent ships entering the Delaware River estuary. One of these mines was revealed following 2016 Hurricane Hermine by local Cape Henlopen state park staff. The sea mine and anchor were archaeologically conserved.

By 1950 the Army's coast defense role had been transferred to the Navy and coastal artillery defenses were obsolete with the fort becoming surplus. The Army continued to use portions and in 1962 the Navy established Naval Facility (NAVFAC) Lewes, a Sound Surveillance System (SOSUS) shore terminal there to replace the one at Cape May across the bay in New Jersey that was damaged in a storm. The NAVFAC was in commission 1 May 1962 to 30 September 1981. The headquarters building now houses the Biden Environmental Conference Center.

The fort is now Cape Henlopen State Park.

== World War I ==
In 1917 a single 6-inch (152 mm) gun was placed on Cape Henlopen, with another at the Cape May Military Reservation in New Jersey. These were removed after the war.

== World War II ==
Prior to World War II the Harbor Defenses of the Delaware consisted primarily of Fort Saulsbury near Slaughter Beach, Delaware, accepted for service in 1924. This fort had four 12-inch (305 mm) guns on long-range carriages, but was unaccompanied by smaller guns. It had effectively replaced several forts much further upriver, centered on Fort Delaware near Delaware City, though these remained armed until Fort Miles was built in World War II. The Delaware River was one of the coast defense areas of the US that most demonstrated the tendency of defenses to move seaward as gun range increased.

The outbreak of war in Europe in September 1939 and the Fall of France in June 1940 greatly accelerated US defense planning and funding. On 27 July 1940 the Army's Harbor Defense Board recommended the construction of 27 (eventually 38) 16-inch (406 mm) two-gun batteries to protect strategic points along the US coastline, to be casemated against air attack. Two of these batteries were to be at Fort Miles, initially called the Cape Henlopen Military Reservation. Construction on the first one, Battery 118 (later named Battery Smith, after Major General William Ruthven Smith), began on 24 March 1941.

The first operational guns at the fort were four mobile 155 mm (6.1 in) guns, which deployed to the fort on 15 April 1941 with two partial batteries of the 21st Coast Artillery Regiment. Concrete "Panama mounts" for these were completed in June 1942. On 5 June 1941 elements of the 261st Coast Artillery Battalion of the Delaware National Guard arrived.

The attack on Pearl Harbor accelerated construction and other activity at the fort. The United States declaration of war on Japan compelled the U.S. Army to continue to garrison the fort with the 261st Coast Artillery Battalion, who days before were slated to leave. Fourteen vessels, including USS Jacob Jones, a U.S. Navy destroyer, were sunk off the coast of New Jersey during the first six months of 1942. Numerous batteries (ranging from 90 mm (3.5 in) guns up to 16-inch (406 mm)) were installed at the fort and a large mine field was laid in the waters off Lewes, Delaware in the following years, but the fort was to see no action during the conflict. In May 1945, the soldiers would receive the surrender of U-858, a German U-boat that was part of Wolfpack Seewolf at the time of the German surrender to Allied forces in Europe. The U-858 was the first enemy ship to surrender to United States forces following the defeat of Germany in World War II

On 14 March 1942 Battery C of the 52nd Coast Artillery (CA) (Railway) regiment arrived with four 8-inch (203 mm) railway guns. By 10 September this battery was joined by Battery D with the same armament; Batteries C and D were initially the 2nd Battalion of the 52nd CA, and were redesignated as the 287th Coast Artillery (Railway) Battalion on 1 May 1943. Another early battery was the "examination battery", Battery 5 of four 3-inch (76 mm) guns, completed 31 August 1942 and transferred for use 11 December 1943. Two guns each were taken from Fort Delaware and Fort Wadsworth, New York for this battery. In October 1942 the structure of Battery 118 (Smith) was completed, and in December 1942 the 16-inch (406 mm) guns were mounted, but the battery was not transferred for use until 21 December 1943.

In late 1942 construction had yet to begin on Battery 119, the second 16-inch (406 mm) gun battery at the fort. Battery 119 was cancelled and replaced with Battery 519, a casemated battery of two 12-inch (305 mm) guns relocated from Fort Saulsbury. Construction began on Battery 519 on 15 November 1942, was completed on 31 August 1943, and the battery was transferred for use on 15 February 1944.

Batteries 221 (Herring) and 222 (Hunter) were completed in August 1943 and October 1943, and transferred in March 1944 and December 1943, respectively. Each of these had two 6-inch (152 mm) guns on high-angle shielded barbette carriages, with a concrete-and-earth bunker for ammunition and fire control.

Two 90 mm (3.5 in) gun Anti-Motor Torpedo Boat (AMTB) batteries were at Fort Miles as AMTB 5A and AMTB 5B. These were dual-purpose (anti-surface and anti-aircraft) guns. Each battery was authorized two 90 mm (3.5 in) guns on fixed mounts, two on towed mounts, and two single 40 mm (1.6 in) Bofors guns, although the weapons on hand may have varied. Both were completed in June 1943 and transferred in December 1943.

Fort Miles was supplemented by three batteries at the Cape May Military Reservation in New Jersey. The first was Battery 25 with four 155 mm (6.1 in) guns on Panama mounts, built in 1942. Battery 223, a 6-inch (152 mm) battery similar to Batteries 221 and 222 at Fort Miles, was built in 1943. A 90 mm (3.5 in) gun battery was also built at Cape May in 1943.

At its peak, Fort Miles was home to over 2,200 soldiers, men and women, including the 261st Coast Artillery Battalion, the 21st Coast Artillery Regiment, part of the 52nd Coast Artillery (Railway), and a detachment of the 113th Infantry Regiment.

Fort Miles never saw any major action during World War II, firing its guns many times in practice and achieving high marksmanship ratings but never using those guns to engage an enemy. A 16-inch (406 mm) gun was fired exactly once in testing, and the resulting recoil damaged the emplacement, resulting in no further shells fired from Battery Smith.

Fire control towers, four- to five-story round-base concrete towers with flat observation decks, were set up along the coast as baselines to triangulate the position of suspicious ships or submarines. Five such towers still exist within the current boundaries of Cape Henlopen State Park, including one (#7) that has visitor access. Many bunkers were also constructed to house guns and other weapons. Barracks, administration buildings, and a pier were also constructed as part of the fort.

With a significantly reduced threat from enemy surface forces, in March 1944 the first of several drawdowns at Fort Miles commenced. The Headquarters and Headquarters Battery (HHB) of the 261st Coast Artillery Battalion (CA Bn) moved to Fort Jackson, South Carolina in March and was inactivated there on 20 April, with personnel transferred to field artillery units. The remainder of the 261st CA Bn became components of the 21st CA at Fort Miles. In April 1944 the 8-inch railway gun battalion (287th CA Bn) relocated to Fort Bragg, North Carolina and was reorganized as a field artillery battalion. In October 1944 the 21st CA was itself reduced to a battalion with the same number and placed under the Eastern Defense Command, and on 1 April 1945 was inactivated, with remaining personnel at Fort Miles transferring to the Harbor Defenses of the Delaware.

On 14 May 1945, the German submarine U-858 officially surrendered at Fort Miles; it was the first foreign surrender on American soil since the War of 1812.

=== Weaponry ===
The four largest coastal batteries at Fort Miles are Battery 118 (Battery Smith), Battery 221 (Battery Herring), Battery 222 (Battery Hunter), and Battery 519. Due to the late date of its completion, Battery 519 was never formally named and was only designated by its Army Corps of Engineers construction number.

Batteries at Fort Miles
| Number | Name | Completed | Disarmed | Abandoned | Armament | Range (yards (meters)) |
|---|---|---|---|---|---|---|
| 5 (Exam) | | 31 August 1942 | 1946 | | four M1903 3-inch (76 mm) guns on pedestal mounts | 11,300 yd (10,300 m) |
| 5A | | 15 June 1943 | 1946 | | four (two fixed and two mobile) 90 mm (3.5 in) guns and 2 mobile 40 mm (1.6 in) guns | 19,500 yd (17,800 m) |
| 5B | | 15 June 1943 | 1946 | | four (two fixed and two mobile) 90 mm (3.5 in) guns and 2 mobile 40 mm (1.6 in) guns | 19,500 yd (17,800 m) |
| 20 | Rail A | December 1942 | | 5 April 1944 | four MK VI M3A2 8-inch (203 mm) guns mounted on M1A1 Railway Carriages | 35,300 yd (32,300 m) |
| 21 | Rail B | June 1942 | | 5 April 1944 | four MK VI M3A2 8-inch (203 mm) guns mounted on M1A1 Railway Carriages | 35,300 yd (32,300 m) |
| 22 | | 15 June 1942 | February 1944 | "upon completion of permanent batteries" | four 155 mm (6.1 in) M1918M1 guns on Panama mounts | 19,100 yd (17,500 m) |
| 118 | Smith | 31 October 1942 | 1948 | 1958 | two MK II MI Navy 16-inch (406 mm) guns, mounted on Army M4 barbette carriages | 45,150 yd (41,290 m) |
| 221 | Herring | 31 August 1943 | 1948 | 1958 | two M1903A2 6-inch (152 mm) guns on shielded barbette carriages | 27,100 yd (24,800 m) |
| 222 | Hunter | 29 October 1943 | 1947 | 1958 | two M1903A2 6-inch (152 mm) guns on shielded barbette carriages | 27,100 yd (24,800 m) |
| 519 | | 31 August 1943 | 1948 | 1958 | two M1895 M1A2 12-inch (305 mm) guns on M1917 barbette carriages | 29,300 yd (26,800 m) |

== Cold War ==
Most of Fort Miles was declared surplus in 1948 and 1949, but the Army continued to use portions of it through the early 1990s as a Morale, Welfare and Recreation (MWR) area for active and retired military personnel and their families, with the facility coming under the management of Fort Meade. In 1964, 543 acres (2.2 km^{2}) of federal land were donated to the State of Delaware to establish Cape Henlopen State Park. Over time, more land was transferred to the state park until Fort Miles ceased operation as a military MWR facility altogether in 1991, as part of the Base Realignment and Closure Commission (BRAC) process. Fort Miles, consisting of approximately 96 acres, was transferred to the State of Delaware only for public park or recreational purposes. The State of Delaware reimbursed the Army MWR fund $14,369 for expenses expended to improve the property. Its last official usage was as a bivouac for soldiers who had just returned from the first Gulf War.

In 1962, the U.S. Navy took control of a portion of the southern end of Fort Miles, including Batteries Smith and Herring, to establish Naval Facility Lewes (NAVFAC Lewes), a Sound Surveillance System (SOSUS) shore terminal. The terminus had been at Cape May, New Jersey until damaged in the "Ash Wednesday" Storm and that station's equipment had been shipped across to Fort Miles by a Navy Landing Ship, Tank (LST). The Terminal Building was at Battery Herring with administration and barracks facilities further north. The array was reconnected at Lewes by the cable ship Neptune. NAVFAC Lewes would continue to operate until 30 September 1981. Since the SOSUS program was not officially declassified until 1991, the actual operations of NAVFAC Lewes remained classified for the duration of the facility's existence. The headquarters building that also contained some quarters, eating and recreation facilities, became a Naval Reserve Center until all land was returned to the state in 1996. That building remains as the Biden Environmental Conference Center. A married housing complex became facilities for the University of Delaware College of Earth, Ocean and Environmental Sciences.

== Post-military era ==
Battery Smith originally housed the two 16-inch (406 mm) guns and is in use by Cape Henlopen State Park for storage. A 16"/50 caliber Mark 7 gun formerly on USS Missouri (BB-63) has been remounted at Fort Miles as a commemorative display; as of December 2018 part of the wreckage from USS Arizona (BB-39) was planned to be added. Battery Herring, originally covered with sand like all the other batteries, was excavated and expanded for use as NAVFAC Lewes. That structure was removed with the former administration and barracks facility now a conference center. Battery Hunter is in use currently as a Hawk Watch station. Battery 519 originally housed two 12-inch (305 mm) guns. It is currently being renovated for use as a museum, celebrating Delaware's part in World War II. Tours began in 2004. It has a restored 12-inch gun similar to the original mounted at the south gun block. Additionally, it is being used to house a German-built 20 mm anti-aircraft cannon, captured from U-858 after its surrender. A former 8-inch (203 mm) railway gun, converted as a 9.12-inch (232 mm) test weapon, is also on site. Four Panama mounts still exist at Battery 22, located near the Beach House within the park.

Walking tours of the bunkers and other facilities being restored are available during the summer. The project falls under the purview of the Delaware Department of Natural Resources and Environmental Control (DNREC). Historic interpreters can be seen at the park during special events. These events are designed to give the public a demonstration of military life at Fort Miles when it was still in operation. Reenactors at the fort portray the 261st Coast Artillery Battalion and Detachment A, 1252nd Service Command Support Unit (Quartermaster Corps). Several fire control towers remain around Fort Miles; at least one is publicly accessible.

=== Museum ===
In December 2021, Fort Miles Museum and Historical Area, Inc. was established as a non-profit 501(c)(3) organization to guide the Fort Miles Museum that interprets the history of the defense of Delaware’s coast and the role of Fort Miles during the Cold War that followed.

== See also ==
- 198th Signal Battalion (United States) – lineage of 261st CA Battalion
- Seacoast defense in the United States
- United States Army Coast Artillery Corps
