= German submarine U-858 =

German World War II submarine

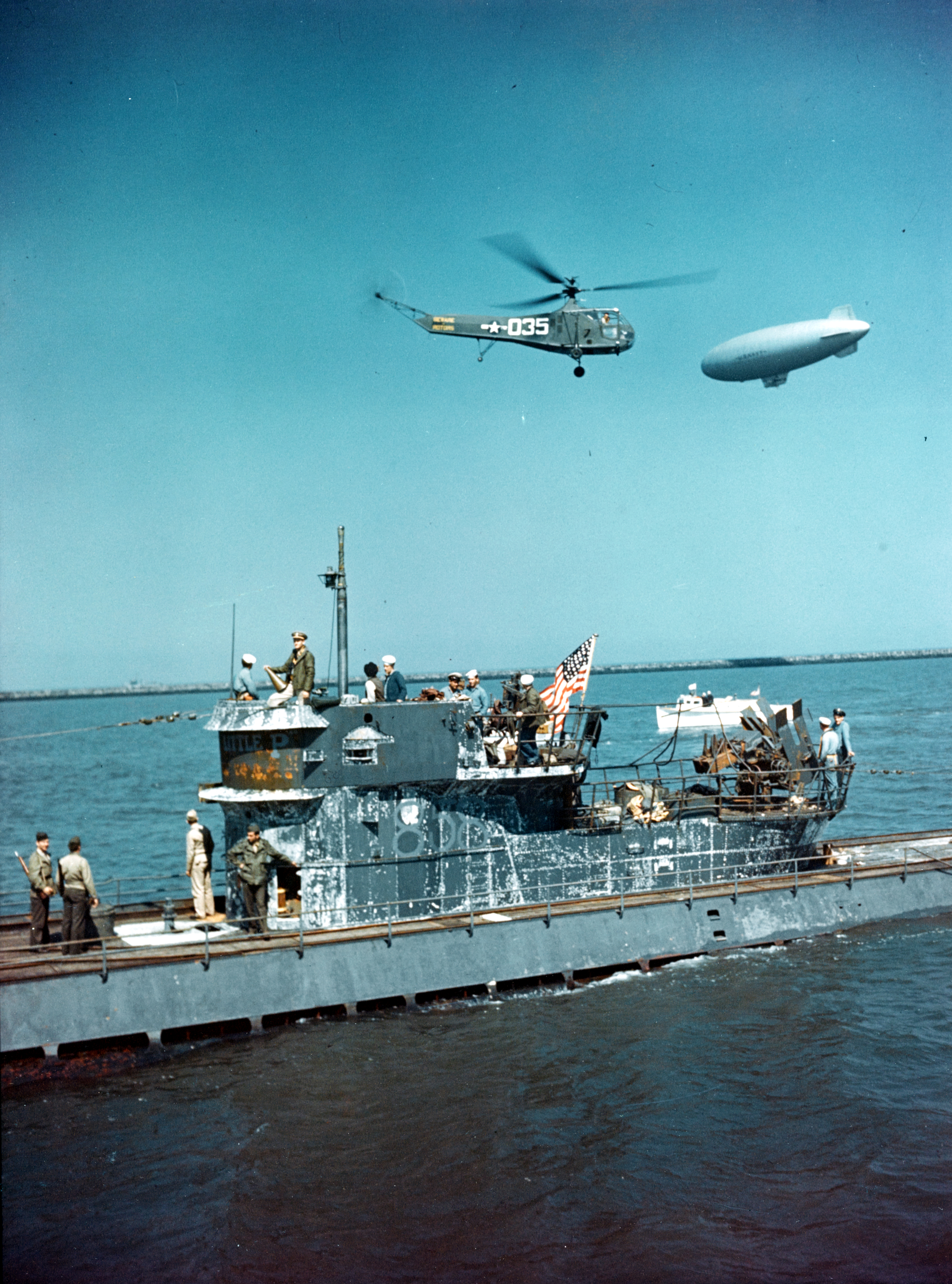
- U-858 after her surrender in May 1945

History

Nazi Germany
- Name: U-858
- Ordered: 5 June 1941
- Builder: DeSchiMAG AG Weser, Bremen
- Yard number: 1064
- Laid down: 11 December 1942
- Launched: 17 June 1943
- Commissioned: 30 September 1943
- Fate: Surrendered on 14 May 1945; Scuttled on 21 November 1947

General characteristics
- Class & type: Type IXC/40 submarine
- Displacement: 1,144 t (1,126 long tons) surfaced; 1,257 t (1,237 long tons) submerged
- Length: 76.76 m (251 ft 10 in) o/a; 58.75 m (192 ft 9 in) pressure hull
- Beam: 6.86 m (22 ft 6 in) o/a; 4.44 m (14 ft 7 in) pressure hull
- Height: 9.60 m (31 ft 6 in)
- Draught: 4.67 m (15 ft 4 in)
- Installed power: 4,400 PS (3,200 kW; 4,300 bhp) (diesels); 1,000 PS (740 kW; 990 shp) (electric)
- Propulsion: 2 shafts; 2 × diesel engines; 2 × electric motors
- Speed: 18.3 knots (33.9 km/h; 21.1 mph) surfaced; 7.3 knots (13.5 km/h; 8.4 mph) submerged
- Range: 13,850 nmi (25,650 km; 15,940 mi) at 10 knots (19 km/h; 12 mph) surfaced; 63 nmi (117 km; 72 mi) at 4 knots (7.4 km/h; 4.6 mph) submerged
- Test depth: 230 m (750 ft)
- Complement: 4 officers, 44 enlisted
- Armament: 6 × torpedo tubes (4 bow, 2 stern); 22 × 53.3 cm (21 in) torpedoes; 1 × 3.7 cm (1.5 in) Flak M42 AA gun; 2 x twin 2 cm (0.79 in) C/30 AA guns

Service record
- Part of: 4th U-boat Flotilla; 30 September 1943 – 30 April 1944; 2nd U-boat Flotilla; 1 May – 30 September 1944; 33rd U-boat Flotilla; 1 October 1944 – 8 May 1945
- Identification codes: M 52 646
- Commanders: Kptlt. Thilo Bode; 30 September 1943 – 14 May 1945
- Operations: 2 patrols: 1st patrol: a. 12 June – 27 September 1944; b. 28 – 29 September 1944; c. 1 – 4 October 1944; d. 2 – 9 March 1945; 2nd patrol: 11 March – 14 May 1945
- Victories: None

German submarine U-858 was a Type IXC/40 U-boat of Germany's Kriegsmarine during World War II. She was ordered on 5 June 1941, laid down on 11 December 1942 and launched on 17 June 1943. She had one commander for her two patrols, Kapitänleutnant Thilo Bode. U-858 was officially surrendered to the United States at Fort Miles in Delaware in May 1945, becoming the first foreign surrender on American soil since the War of 1812.

== Design ==
German Type IXC/40 submarines were slightly larger than the original Type IXCs. U-858 had a displacement of 1,144 tonnes (1,126 long tons) when at the surface and 1,257 tonnes (1,237 long tons) while submerged. The U-boat had a total length of 76.76 m (251 ft 10 in), a pressure hull length of 58.75 m (192 ft 9 in), a beam of 6.86 m (22 ft 6 in), a height of 9.60 m (31 ft 6 in), and a draught of 4.67 m (15 ft 4 in). The submarine was powered by two MAN M 9 V 40/46 supercharged four-stroke, nine-cylinder diesel engines producing a total of 4,400 metric horsepower (3,240 kW; 4,340 shp) for use while surfaced, two Siemens-Schuckert 2 GU 345/34 double-acting electric motors producing a total of 1,000 shaft horsepower (1,010 PS; 750 kW) for use while submerged. She had two shafts and two 1.92 m (6 ft) propellers. The boat was capable of operating at depths of up to 230 metres (750 ft).

The submarine had a maximum surface speed of 18.3 knots (33.9 km/h; 21.1 mph) and a maximum submerged speed of 7.3 knots (13.5 km/h; 8.4 mph). When submerged, the boat could operate for 63 nautical miles (117 km; 72 mi) at 4 knots (7.4 km/h; 4.6 mph); when surfaced, she could travel 13,850 nautical miles (25,650 km; 15,940 mi) at 10 knots (19 km/h; 12 mph). U-858 was fitted with six 53.3 cm (21 in) torpedo tubes (four fitted at the bow and two at the stern), 22 torpedoes, and a 3.7 cm (1.5 in) Flak M42 as well as two twin 2 cm (0.79 in) C/30 anti-aircraft guns. The boat had a complement of forty-eight.

== Service history ==
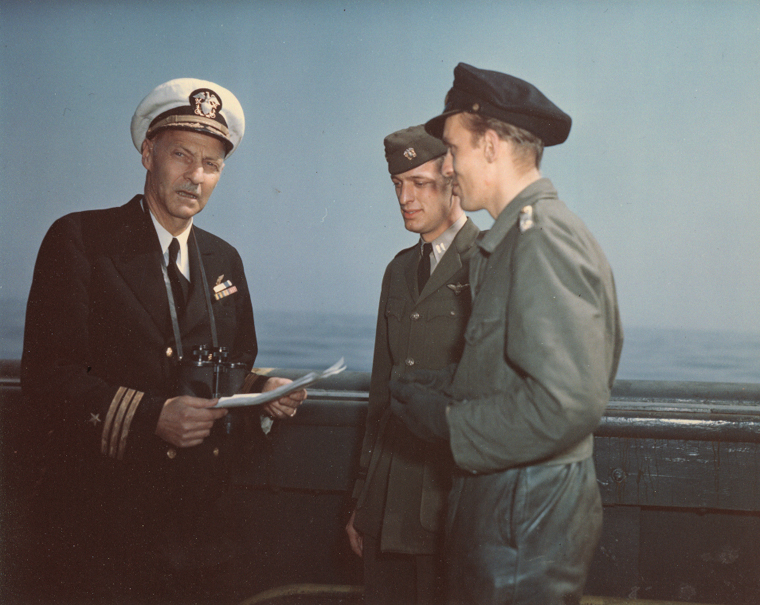
Kptlt. Thilo Bode (at right) during the formal surrender of U-858

The submarine was sent by Germany at the end of the war to cause havoc along the East Coast of the United States, in an attempt to repeat the success of Operation Drumbeat. However, she saw no combat in that mission and did not sink or damage any allied ships during the war.

Her captain, Kapitanleutnant Thilo Bode, (Note: Bode died in January 2014 in Munich, aged 95.) formally surrendered her on 14 May 1945 (Note: Other German U-boats surrendered to other Allied forces prior to U-858 surrendering to American forces; these include U-249 on May 10 and U-3008 on May 11.) at Fort Miles near Lewes, Delaware. (Note: While the formal surrender took place on May 14 at Fort Miles, U-858 first gave herself up at sea four days earlier.) This was the first instance of a foreign surrender occurring within the United States since the War of 1812.

After surrendering, the submarine was used for publicity in war bond drives. After being used for torpedo practice near the New England area, she was scuttled by the U.S. Navy on 21 November 1947.

== Bibliography ==
- Busch, Rainer; Röll, Hans-Joachim (1999). German U-boat commanders of World War II : a biographical dictionary. Translated by Brooks, Geoffrey. London, Annapolis, Md: Greenhill Books, Naval Institute Press. ISBN 1-55750-186-6.
- Busch, Rainer; Röll, Hans-Joachim (1999). Der U-Boot-Krieg, 1939-1945: Deutsche U-Boot-Verluste von September 1939 bis Mai 1945 [German U-boat losses from September 1939 to May 1945] (in German). Vol. IV. Hamburg, Berlin, Bonn: Mittler. ISBN 3-8132-0514-2.
- Gröner, Eric; Jung, Dieter; Maass, Martin (1991). German Warships 1815-1945: U-boats and Mine Warfare Vessels. Vol. 2. Translated by Thomas, Keith; Magowan, Rachel. London: Conway Maritime Press. ISBN 0-85177-593-4.
