= Delaware Breakwater East End Light =

Delaware Breakwater East End Light Lewes
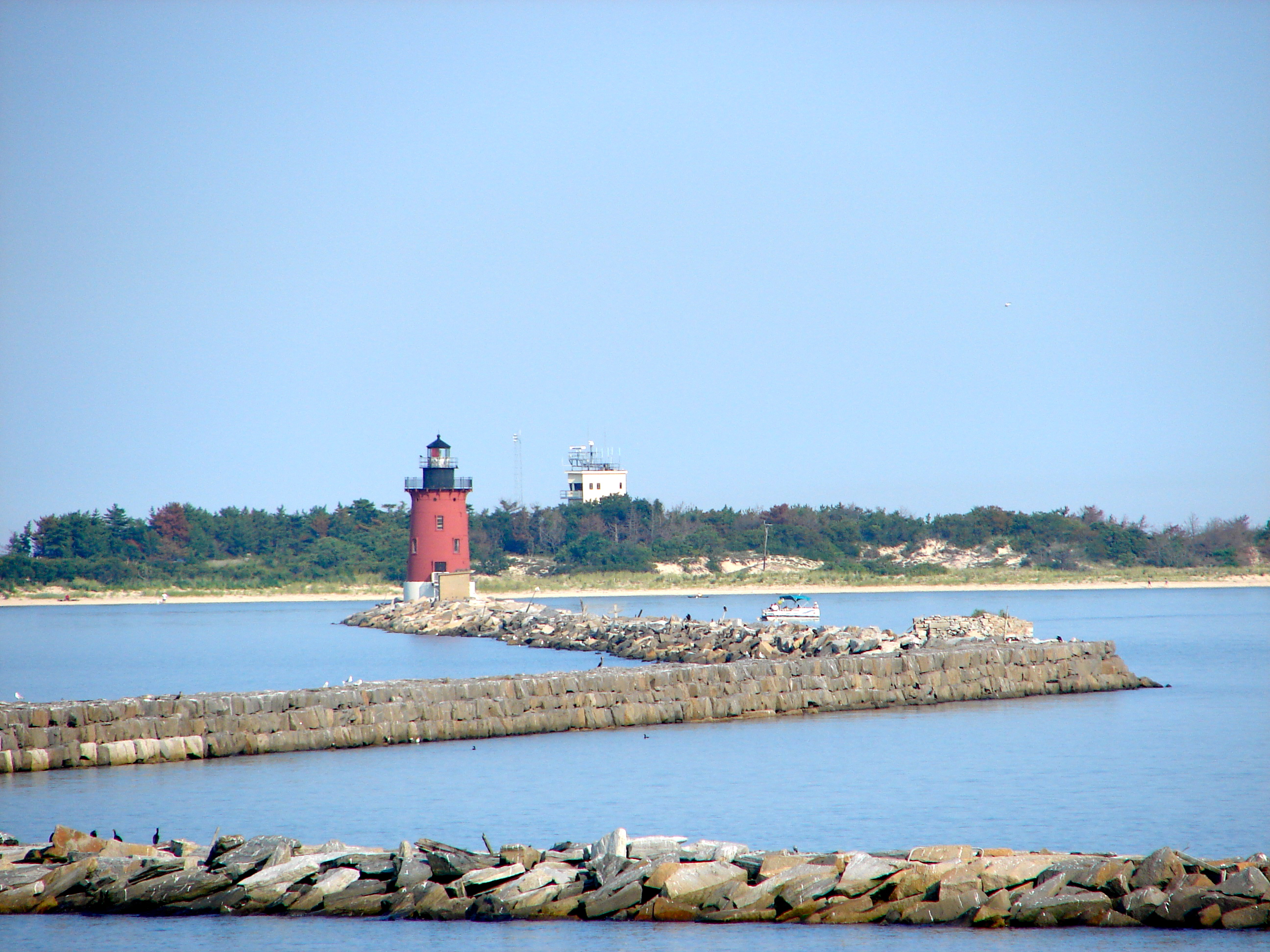
- Delaware Breakwater East End Light in 2010
- Location: Lewes; Delaware; United States
- Coordinates: 38°47′49.8″N 75°06′00.0″W

Tower
- Constructed: 1885
- Foundation: cast iron caisson
- Construction: sparkplug lighthouse
- Automated: July 1950
- Height: 49 feet (15 m)
- Shape: conical tower with balcony and lantern incorporating 3-storey keeper's quarter
- Markings: brown tower, black lantern
- Operator: Delaware River and Bay Lighthouse Foundation

Light
- Deactivated: 1996
- Focal height: 60.5 feet (18.4 m)
- Lens: Fourth-order Fresnel Lens
- Characteristic: current decorative light

The Delaware Breakwater East End Light is a lighthouse located on the inner Delaware Breakwater in the Delaware Bay, just off the coast of Cape Henlopen and the town of Lewes, Delaware.

== Construction and early use ==
In 1884 a light was commissioned for the east end of the Delaware Breakwater. The light was built to replace the Cape Henlopen Beacon, which was rapidly deteriorating at the time and was taken out of service later that same year. Construction began in 1885 and a temporary light on a wooden frame was placed near the building site during the process. The foundation of the tower was embedded into the breakwater. The iron structure, which was listed at 56 feet (17 m) tall as of 1914, was completed on October 2, 1885. The tower was fitted with a fourth-order Fresnel lens—which is still in the lighthouse to this day—and also included one red sector in order to warn vessels approaching the nearby Hen and Chickens Shoal. A fog signal was installed about a month later. During the following year a wharf and oil house were built and completed at the site.

Shortly after its creation that tower was tested in the severe winds of the Great Blizzard of 1888. In 1903, the light replaced the discontinued Delaware Breakwater West End Light as the front range for the Delaware Breakwater, though the original Delaware Breakwater Range Rear Light continued to serve as the rear range until 1918, when it was also discontinued. The light was automated on July 11, 1950. Life at the lighthouse was also said to be quite difficult. The tower was small, with the exterior diameter measuring only 22 feet (6.7 m) at the base and 18 feet (5.5 m) at the watch level. In addition, the constant heavy fog at Cape Henlopen meant that the fog signal was almost constantly blaring. From July 1, 1896 to June 30, 1897, the fog signal operated for 400 hours. The following year, the signal operated for 440 hours. Not long after, the lighthouse record was set in 1905 when the signal was used for 645 hours.

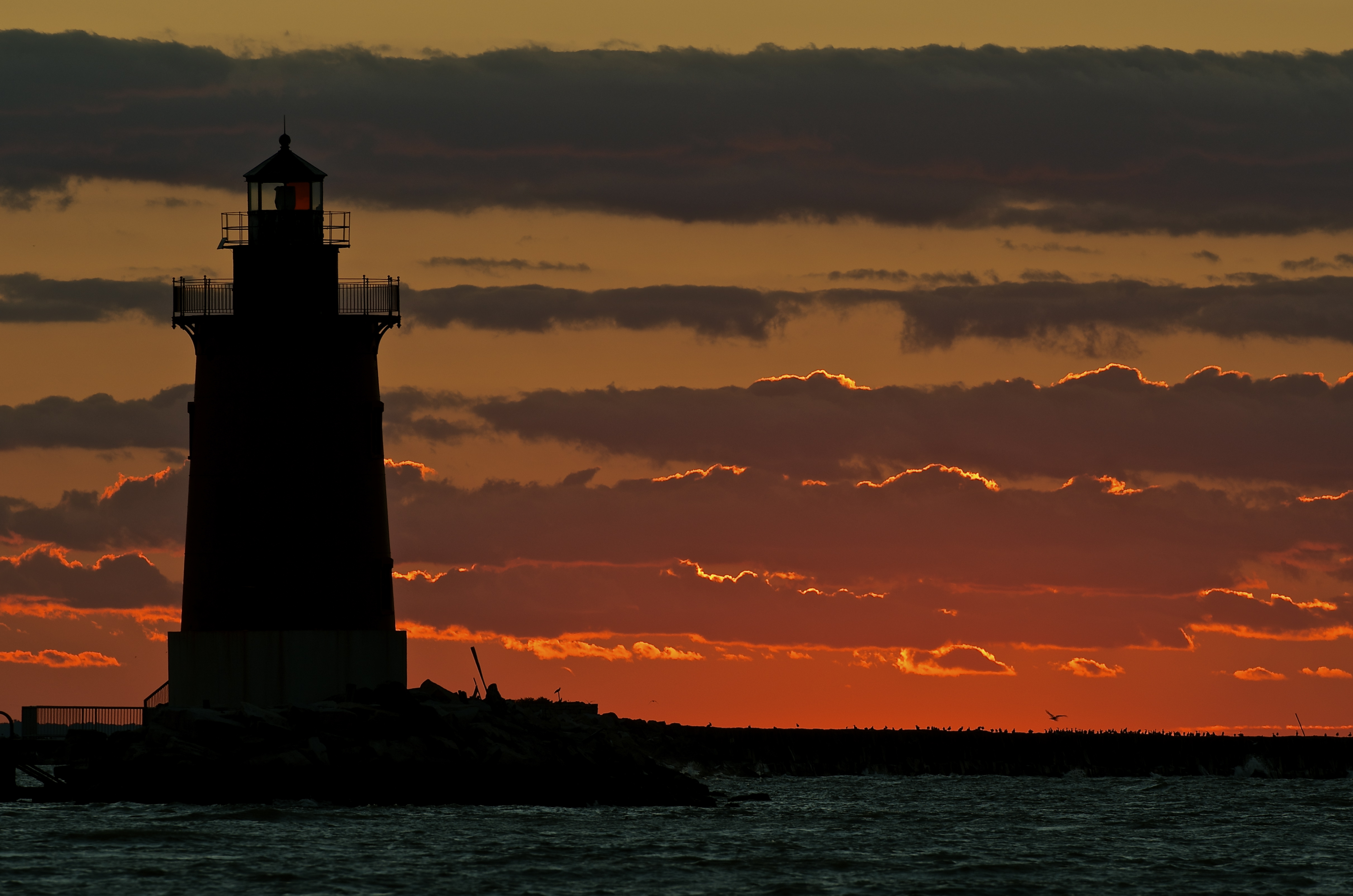
Light at twilight

== History ==
Shoaling at Cape Henlopen gradually reduced the significance of the light and the Harbor of Refuge Light began to serve mariners in a more practical way at its location on the outer breakwater, much closer to the mouth of the Delaware Bay. As a result of its reduced importance, the light was officially discontinued in 1996. In 1999, the light's ownership was transferred to the State of Delaware. The lighthouse was eventually leased to the Delaware River & Bay Authority, the bi-state group that manages ferries and airports for Delaware and New Jersey. In 2004 the Authority and the Delaware River and Bay Lighthouse Foundation, a non-profit, volunteer organization, entered into a contract whereby the Foundation became advisors on the preservation to be undertaken by the Authority and were responsible for tours and educational activities. Since then tours have been regularly scheduled throughout each summer.

== See also ==
- List of lighthouses in Delaware
- List of lighthouses in the United States
