= Delaware Breakwater =

- Delaware Breakwater and Lewes Harbor
- U.S. National Register of Historic Places
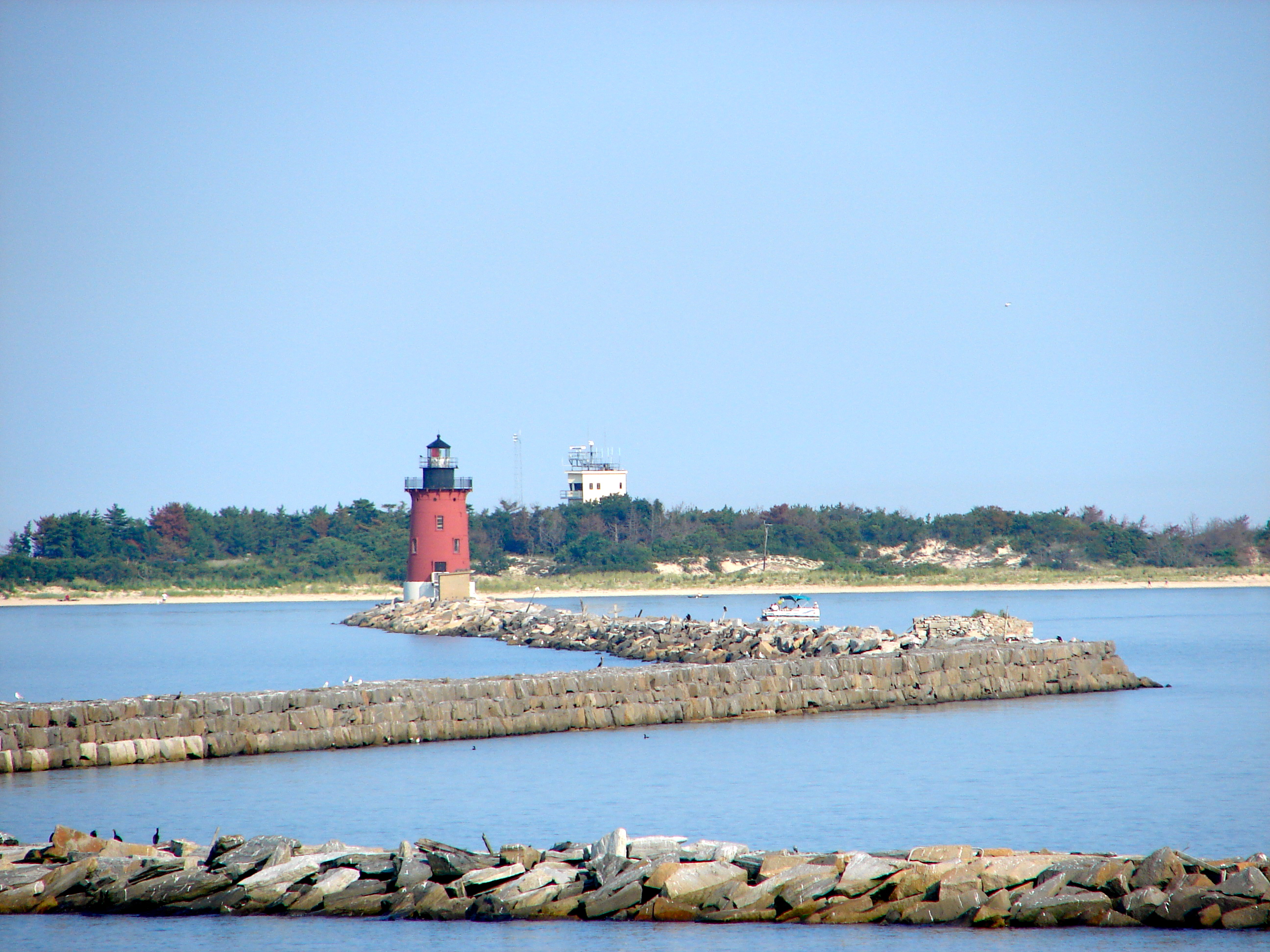

- Location within Delaware
- Nearest city: Lewes, Delaware
- Coordinates: 38°47′52″N 75°6′30″W
- Built: 1828
- Architect: William Strickland; Simon Bernard
- NRHP reference No.: 76000586
- Added to NRHP: December 12, 1976

The Delaware Breakwater is a set of breakwaters east of Lewes, Delaware on Cape Henlopen that form Lewes Harbor. They were listed on the National Register of Historic Places on December 12, 1976.

The original 1,700-foot (520 m) and 2,800-foot (850 m) breakwaters were built in 1828. The breakwaters are now included in the National Harbor of Refuge and Delaware Breakwater Harbor Historic District.

The stone for the breakwater were quarried from what later became Bellevue Lake in New Castle County. The breakwaters were the first structure of their kind to be built in the Americas.

== See also ==
Delaware Breakwater East End Light
