= Delaware Breakwater Range Front Light =

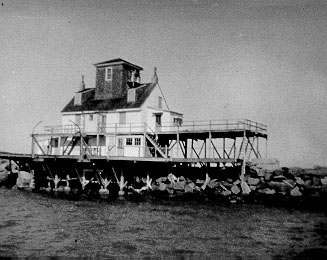
- Location: Delaware Breakwater, Delaware
- Coordinates: 38.79122°N 75.1595°W

Tower
- Constructed: 1838
- Height: 12 m (39 ft)

Light
- First lit: 1903
- Deactivated: 1903
- Focal height: 14 m (46 ft)
- Lens: Six lamps and reflectors (original), fourth order Fresnel lens (1875)
- Characteristic: White light flashes every 45 seconds

Delaware Breakwater Range Front Light was a lighthouse in Delaware, United States, on the Delaware Breakwater, Delaware Bay, Delaware.

== History ==
Delaware Breakwater West End Lighthouse was built in 1838. In 1881 this light became the front light of the Delaware Breakwater Range. When this light was deactivated in 1903, the Delaware Breakwater West End Light became the front light in the range. The unoccupied house was destroyed in 1950.
