= Harbor of Refuge Light =

Lighthouse in Delaware, United States

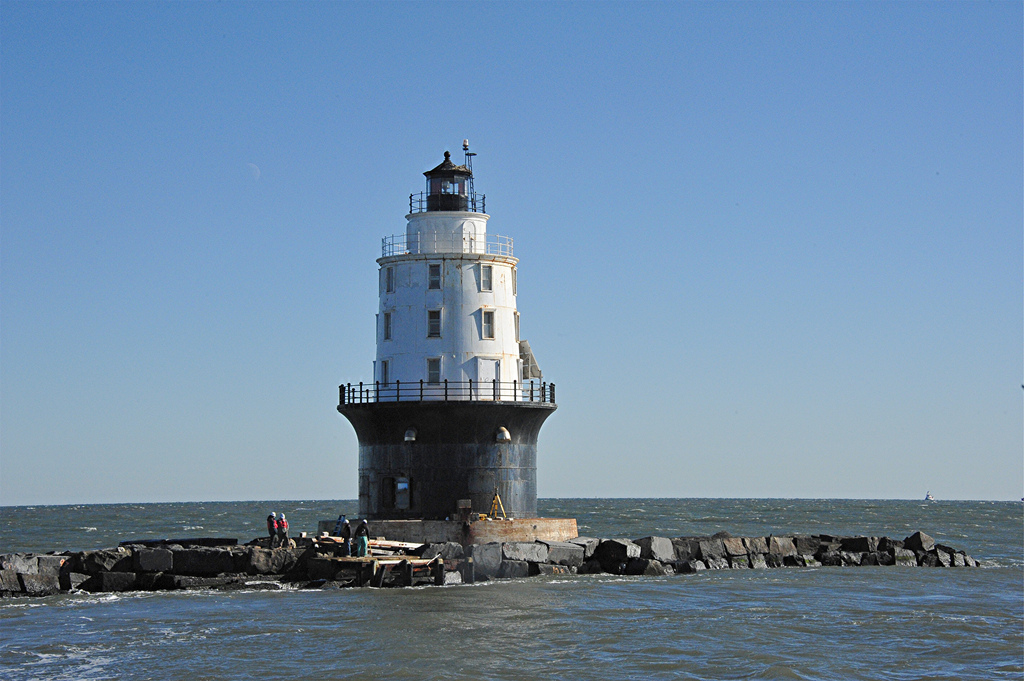
- Harbor of Refuge Light from the Cape Henlopen Ferry
- Location: Lewes, Delaware
- Coordinates: 38°48′52.6″N 75°05′32.6″W

Tower
- Constructed: 1908
- Foundation: Sparkplug Style Cast-iron Caisson
- Construction: Cast-iron
- Automated: since December 1973
- Height: 76 feet (23 m)
- Shape: Conical
- Heritage: National Register of Historic Places contributing property

Light
- First lit: 1926
- Focal height: 72 feet (22 m)
- Lens: Fourth Order Fresnel Lens (original), VRB-25 (current)
- Range: 19 nautical miles (35 km; 22 mi)
- Characteristic: white flash every 10 s

The Harbor of Refuge Light (originally Harbor of Refuge West End Light, though its east end counterpart has been long since discontinued) is a lighthouse built on the ocean end of the outer Delaware Breakwater at the mouth of the Delaware Bay, just off Cape Henlopen. It was built to function with the Delaware Breakwater East End Light in order to mark the National Harbor of Refuge.

== History ==
=== Establishment of Delaware breakwater ===
In 1825, an act of Congress authorized the initial construction of a breakwater off of Cape Henlopen in order to create a harbor for ships in stormy weather. This breakwater was not completed until 1869. As shipbuilding advanced into the second half of the 19th century, this harbor was no longer sufficiently deep for the newer and larger ships of the US Navy. Thus an outer breakwater was constructed to solve this problem in 1892. The new breakwater was built about 1.25 miles (2.01 km) north of the original breakwater. Work on this 7,950-foot (2,420 m) breakwater was finally completed in 1901. The new safe harbor was called the National Harbor of Refuge.

=== Temporary beacon and first tower ===
The breakwater was first illuminated by a pair of temporary beacons placed at either end. The south end, where the current lighthouse stands, featured a white frame tower of 30 feet (9.1 m) with a “five-day” lens lantern exhibiting a red light. The tower, completed on January 1, 1902, also had a fog horn. Both beacons were destroyed in a storm the following year and were subsequently replaced.

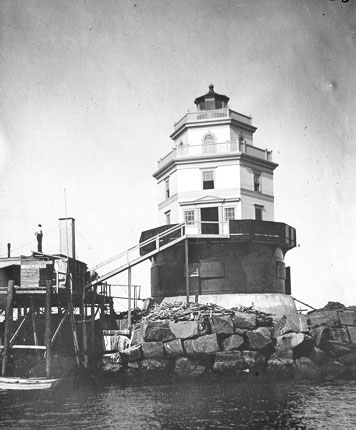
The First Harbor of Refuge Light from 1908

In 1906 construction began on a permanent structure for the southern end of the outer breakwater. The brown, cylindrical, iron foundation was completed in 1907. The 52-foot (16 m) frame tower was white and hexagonal in shape, had three stories and lead colored trim topped with a black lantern. This structure was finally completed on November 20, 1908. The original plan had called for a brick structure, though this was changed to wood during the final planning. This initial lighthouse was fitted with a fourth order Fresnel lens, which flashed with white every 10 seconds. In addition a first-class fog siren operated by compressed air was installed. This station quickly proved to be ill-suited to the conditions, however. Storms threw waves completely over the top of the tower. The lighthouse was moved two inches off its foundation in a 1918 storm, and by another two inches in 1920. As a result, it was rendered uninhabitable and it was then dismantled by United States Lighthouse Service in 1925.

=== The current tower ===
On November 15, 1926, the new Harbor of Refuge light was established. This new cast-iron structure was designed to endure the most intense of Atlantic storms. The current structure of 76 feet (23 m) is a white, conical tower with a black lantern. The house itself lies on a cast-iron caisson which is built into the breakwater. The pier of the tower is lined inside with reinforced concrete, while the interior of the tower in lined with brick. All of this rest on a block of concrete within the breakwater. Originally the tower was equipped with a four-panel fourth order Fresnel lens that flashed every 10 seconds at a 72-foot (22 m) focal point. The lens revolved on ball bearings and was driven by a clockwork mechanism driven by weights within a hollow central iron column.

This construction was severely tested on several occasions. A 1929 storm hit the lighthouse with 78 mph winds. In 1960, Hurricane Donna broke a window on the main deck. The Ash Wednesday Storm of 1962 then hit Delaware Bay, partially flooding the lighthouse when a wave broke a second story window. Intense winds shook the tower, and the high seas completely submerged the breakwater. The caisson was also struck by a ship in 1986.

After the Fresnel lens became outdated, the house was fitted with a DCB-36 Aerobeacon operated by commercial power. This was used from about 1945 until 1997, when it too became outdated. Today the tower operates with a Vega VRB-25 operated by solar power and displaying a flashing white light every 10 seconds and is visible up to 19 miles (31 km) away. It also has two red sectors which can be seen for 16 miles (26 km) and warn of nearby shoals. As a backup, there is a 250-mm lantern operated by solar power, though its visibility is only 9 miles (14 km). Lastly, the fog signal is an FA/232 and also operated by solar power, emitting 2 blasts every 30 seconds. The lighthouse was automated in 1973 and is still an active aid to navigation.

=== History ===
The exterior of the tower was restored by the United States Coast Guard in 1999. That same year, the Delaware River and Bay Lighthouse Foundation began working on its restoration. In 2001 the Coast Guard repaired the docking platform and ladders to improve safety of access to the building. In April 2002, the Delaware River and Bay Lighthouse Foundation, a non-profit, volunteer organization, signed a lease to manage the structure. The station's dock landing was restored in March 2003 and the first tour was held in June. Except for a brief hiatus in 2005 because of an inability to get insurance for the lighthouse, the Foundation has continued a regular schedule of tours each summer since then. The organization was granted ownership by the U.S. Department of the Interior in 2004 under the National Historic Lighthouse Preservation Act of 2000. The first step was to restore the windows, which had been removed and boarded up by the Coast Guard. Damage by Hurricane Isabel in September was quickly repaired, but there is concern that the lighthouse is endangered by the poor condition of the Harbor of Refuge Breakwater on which it is built and which is still owned by the Federal Government and is the maintenance responsibility of the U.S. Army Corps of Engineers. With the blessing of the Corps of Engineers, the Delaware River & Bay Lighthouse Foundation began seeking Federal appropriations to fund repairs to the breakwater. An appropriation of just under $350,000 was finally made with the Federal budget for 2008 and the Corps began survey and planning work in preparation for repairs. The Corps and the Foundation estimate that at least $2.7 million is needed to stabilize the 100-year-old structure. Meanwhile, the Foundation continues to preserve the lighthouse itself and, in 2008 procured a new stainless steel door system for the main entryway.
