= Cape Henlopen Light =

Lighthouse in Delaware, United States

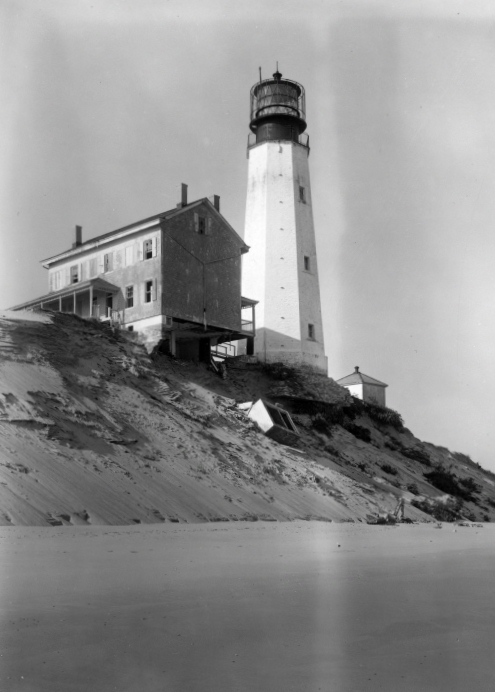
- Location: Cape Henlopen, Sussex County, United States
- Coordinates: 38°46′42″N 75°05′04″W

Tower
- Constructed: 1767
- Height: 69 ft (21 m)

Light
- First lit: 1769
- Deactivated: 1924
- Lens: first order Fresnel lens
- Characteristic: Fl W with R sector

Cape Henlopen Light was a lighthouse near Lewes, in present-day Cape Henlopen State Park, Delaware, United States. The lighthouse was on the north side of the Great Dune on Cape Henlopen, Delaware. It was the sixth lighthouse built in the colonies.

== History ==
Cape Henlopen Lighthouse was constructed on the north side of the Great Dune to obtain additional height. Mariners from Philadelphia lobbied for the construction of a lighthouse, and many ships had fallen victim to the dark waters around the cape, necessitating construction of such a lighthouse. The land was donated by Thomas and William Penn. It was completed in 1767 and first lit in 1769. In 1777, during the American Revolution, the lighthouse was almost completely destroyed by the British. The wardens repaired the damage and it was relit by 1784. In 1897, the sand dune surrounding the tower was reported to be steadily blowing away at a rate of 3 to 5 feet (0.91 to 1.52 m) per year. In 1905, several tons of brush were placed about the tower and oil house to prevent the foundations and brick walls from being undermined by the drifting away of the sand.

Before the structure's collapse in 1926, though, the tower had been discontinued as a lighthouse. Earlier in 1924, the lens was removed from the light for refurbishing and to be placed on display. With the building of the Brandywine Light, waiting areas were no longer needed behind the breakwaters, so the light was disabled. All measures to protect the tower failed and in April 1926, a storm undermined the tower, causing it to fall seaward.

Another light also once stood on Cape Henlopen. In 1824, the Cape Henlopen Beacon was constructed on a 45-foot (14 m) tower about a mile north of the Cape Henlopen Lighthouse. Before the Beacon was assigned a keeper, the keeper of the Henlopen Light was in charge of maintaining the Beacon.

== Replicas and representations ==
A replica of Cape Henlopen Light was built in 1924, and in 2004 was moved to the middle of the roundabout on Delaware Route 1A (Rehoboth Avenue) entering Rehoboth Beach. A second replica of the lighthouse was built and placed on a small hill overlooking the 5 points intersection on Route 1.

The Light is featured in a lot of local artwork, books, and media. Many local gift shops have wooden replicas for sale. The light is also used in the Cape Henlopen School District's logo.
