= Cape Henlopen =

Cape in Delaware, United States

Coordinates: 38.771484°N 75.095501°W

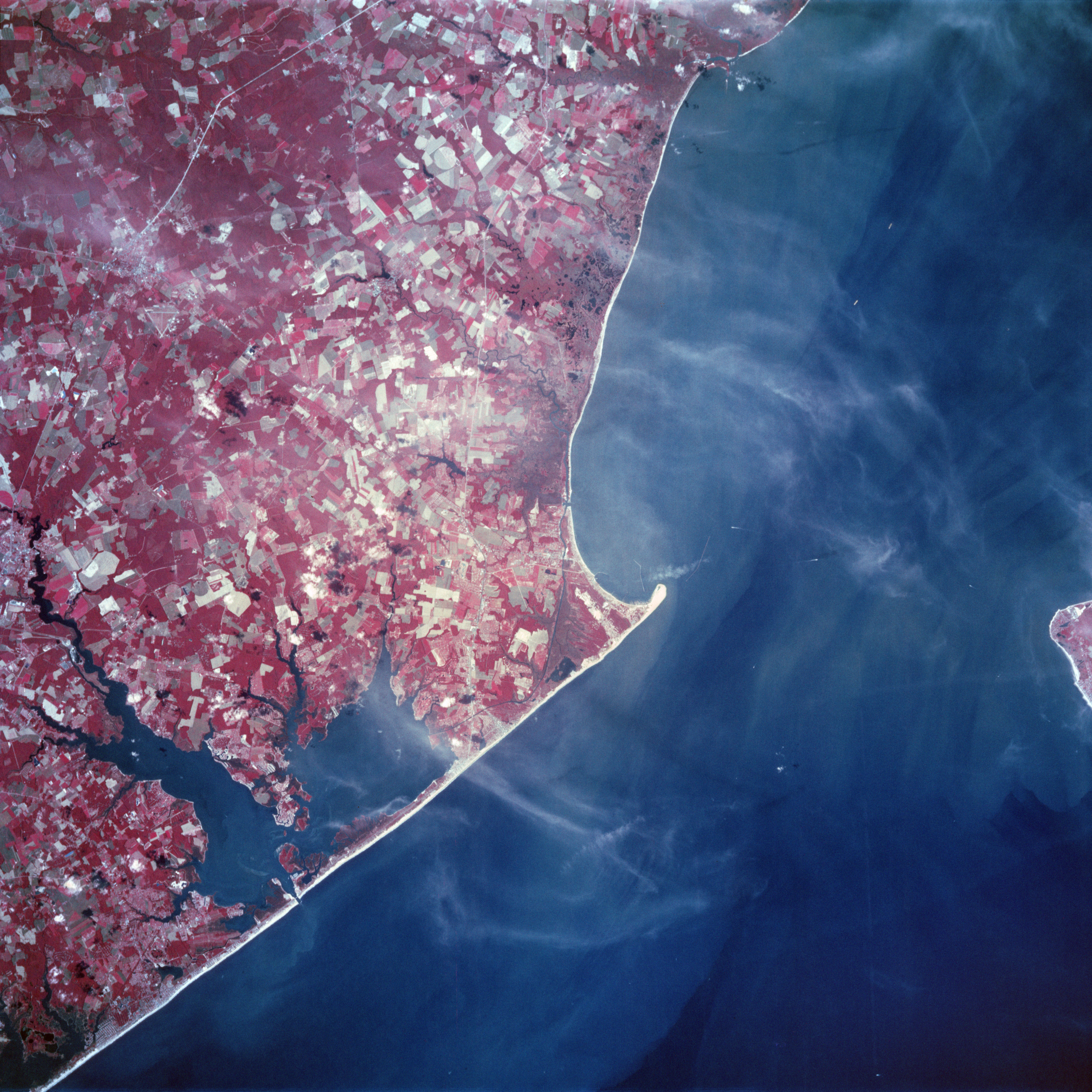
Cape Henlopen from space, October 1994

Cape Henlopen is the southern cape of the Delaware Bay along the Atlantic coast of the United States. It lies in the state of Delaware, near the town of Lewes, where the Delaware Bay meets the Atlantic Ocean. Off the coast on the bay side are two lighthouses, called the Harbor of Refuge Light and the Delaware Breakwater East End Light.

== Early history ==
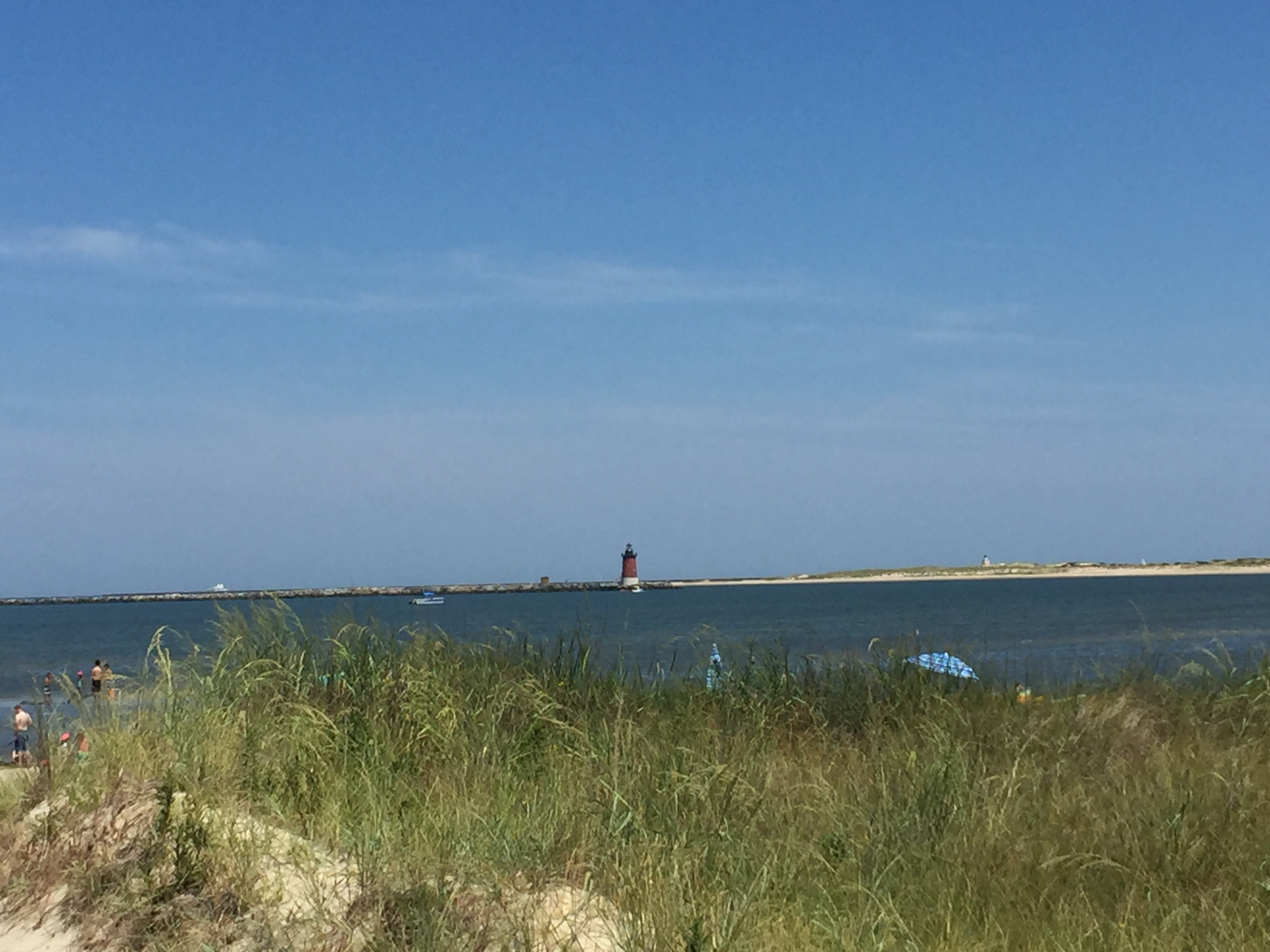
Cape Henlopen from fishing pier

Cape Henlopen, originally spelled Cape Hinlopen (after its namesake Thijmen Jacobsz Hinlopen who was a prominent Dutch trader), was New Netherland's southernmost border on the 37th parallel north.

In 1620, Thijmen Jacobsz Hinlopen became the business partner of Cornelis Jacobsen Mey in the now washed out Cape Cornelius and the incorrectly spelled Cape May with the ships Blijde Boodschap (English: "Good News") and Bever both of which focused on exploration and trade with the Indians on the Delaware River (then Zuidt Rivier).

The area between the 38th and 40th parallels (i.e., the Delaware Bay area) as well as the Delaware River from north to south had previously been surveyed and charted by Cornelis Hendricksz from Monnikendam on the ship "Onrust" in 1614, 1615 and 1616. From August until November 1616, the New Netherland Company, which had an exclusive trading patent for the New Netherland territory between 40° and 45° latitude, had tried unsuccessfully to obtain an exclusive patent from the States General of the Dutch Republic for the territory between 38° and 40° latitude.

Cornelis Jacobsz Mey was also unable to trade in the South River (Delaware River) at the exclusion of competing Dutch companies. Those Dutch companies came in conflict with one another but were eventually able to reach agreement in New Netherland. Discord arose again which was settled, finally, by a judgment of arbitrators at Amsterdam on December 23, 1623. The 38th and 39th parallels region came under the final jurisdiction of the Dutch West India Company on behalf of the States General with the delivery of the first settlers to Governors Island in New Netherland in 1624. Those settlers were subsequently spread out onto Verhulsten Island (Burlington Island) in the Delaware, at Fort Orange (now Albany) in the Hudson River and at the mouth of the Connecticut River in order to finalize the claim to New Netherland as a North American province according to the Hugo Grotius Law of Nations (? year).

In 1782 during the American Revolutionary War, the young Continental Navy Lieutenant Joshua Barney fought with a British squadron at Cape May and Delaware Bay. Barney's force of three sloops defeated a Royal Navy frigate, a sloop-of-war and a Loyalist privateer. The battle ended with the loss of two British vessels and one American sloop.

== State Park ==
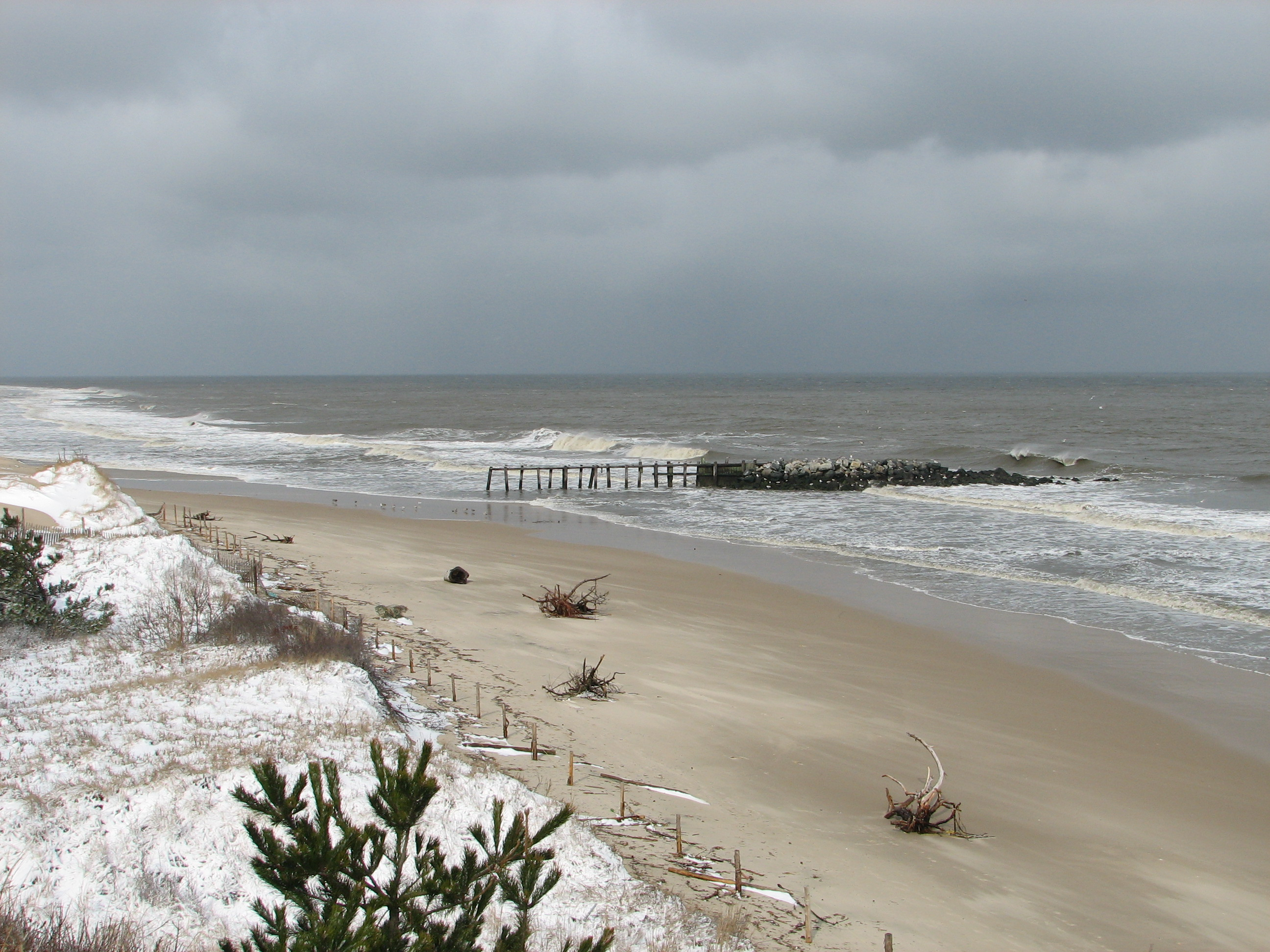
Looking north from Herring Point

Cape Henlopen State Park is a 5,193 acre (21 km^{2}) Delaware state park on Cape Henlopen. William Penn made the beaches of Cape Henlopen one of the first public lands established in what has become the United States in 1682 with the declaration that Cape Henlopen would be for "the usage of the citizens of Lewes and Sussex County." Cape Henlopen State Park has a 24-hour and year-round fishing pier as well as campgrounds. The remainder of the park is only open from sunrise to sunset, and includes a bathhouse on the Atlantic Ocean, an area for surf-fishing, a disc golf course, and bicycle lanes, walking paths, and a World War II-era watchtower which is open to the public. The beach at Herring Point is also a popular surfing spot.

Camp Henlopen serves as the Eastern terminus for the American Discovery Trail, the only coast to coast hiking trail in the United States.

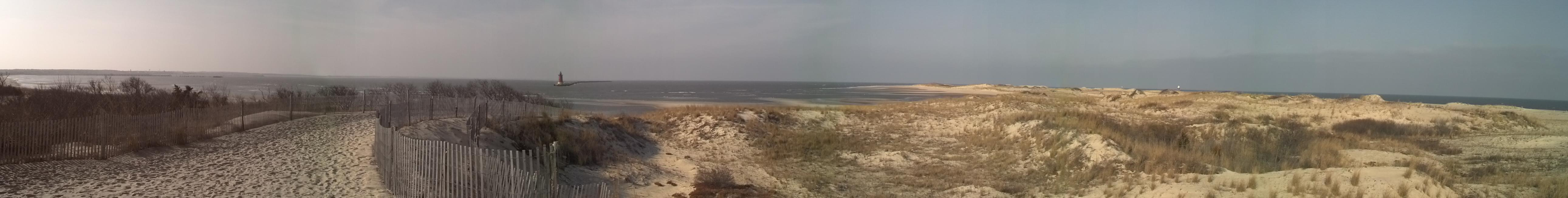
Cape Henlopen seen from Cape Henlopen State Park

== Timeline of Cape Henlopen ==
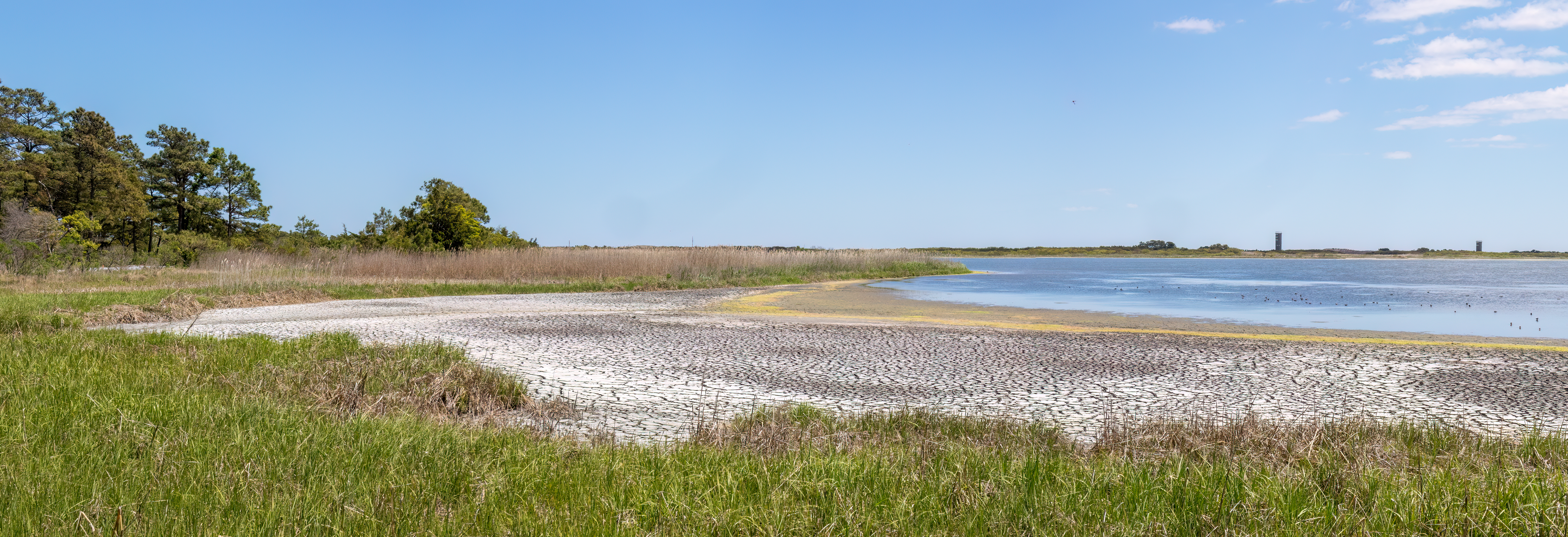
Gordon's Pond

- 1682 William Penn designates the area as public land.
- 1767-9 Construction of the Cape Henlopen Lighthouse completed at the Great Dune – the sixth lighthouse on American soil. This construction was funded by the merchants of Philadelphia.
- 10 May 1776, Rear Admiral Molyneux Shuldham orders HMS Orpheus to cruize between Cape Henlopen and the west end of Long Island, calling in at Delaware and New York.
- 1777 the Cape Henlopen Lighthouse was gutted by fire.
- 1784 the Cape Henlopen Lighthouse was repaired and returned to active duty.
- 1789 Pennsylvania cedes the lighthouse, associated land, and jurisdiction to the United States.
- 1824 The Cape Henlopen Beacon was constructed on a 45-foot (14 m) tower about a mile (1.6 km) north of the Cape Henlopen Lighthouse.
- 1855 Construction of the Delaware Breakwater East End Lighthouse completed.
- 1869 Construction of the Delaware Breakwater West End Lighthouse and stone breakwater barrier completed.
- 1885 The steel Strickland Lighthouse replaces the lighthouse on the inner breakwater.
- 1901 Construction of the 8,000 foot (2.4 km) long outer stone breakwater barrier completed.
- 1903 The Strickland Lighthouse is retired from service.
- c. 1915 to 1920 Radio Compass Station built
- 1918 6-inch gun platform built (World War I era)
- 1920 Cape Henlopen Lighthouse badly damaged by a storm.
- 1924 Cape Henlopen Lighthouse abandoned – lens removed.
- 1926 (April 13) Cape Henlopen Lighthouse collapsed due to movement of Great Dune.
- 1941 U.S. Army established Fort Miles at Cape Henlopen.
- 1950 The Delaware Breakwater Lighthouse demolished and the East End Lighthouse was automated.
- 1964 The U.S. Department of Defense declared 543 acres (2.20 km^{2}) as surplus property and the State of Delaware established Cape Henlopen State Park.
- 1966 The USS Buncombe County (LST-510) was renamed MV Cape Henlopen and converted to a passenger and auto ferry.
- 1978 The Fenwick Lighthouse is decommissioned.
- Gordon's Pond Wildlife Area established.
- 1982 The State of Delaware assumed ownership of the Fenwick lighthouse and it was electrified and returned to operation.
- 1997 The State of Delaware purchased the East End lighthouse and placed it on the National Register of Historic Places.
- 2007 The two 300 ft (91 m) groins of Herring Point originally built in 1950 are cleaned up and rebuilt.

National Harbor of Refuge, outer breakwater off Cape Henlopen. All metal, built in 1926 and automated in 1973. Maintained by US Coast Guard. Visible from Cape May-Lewes Ferry.

== See also ==
- National Harbor of Refuge and Delaware Breakwater Harbor Historic District
