= Paradise Point =

Paradise Point may refer to:

- Paradise Point, Pakistan
- Paradise Point, Queensland, a coastal suburb in the City of Gold Coast, Australia
- Paradise Point State Park, Washington
- Paradise Point State Recreation Site, Oregon

== See also ==
- Fisher's Paradise, historic home; also known as Paradise Point
