= Lewes, Delaware =

City in Delaware, United States

- Incorporated city
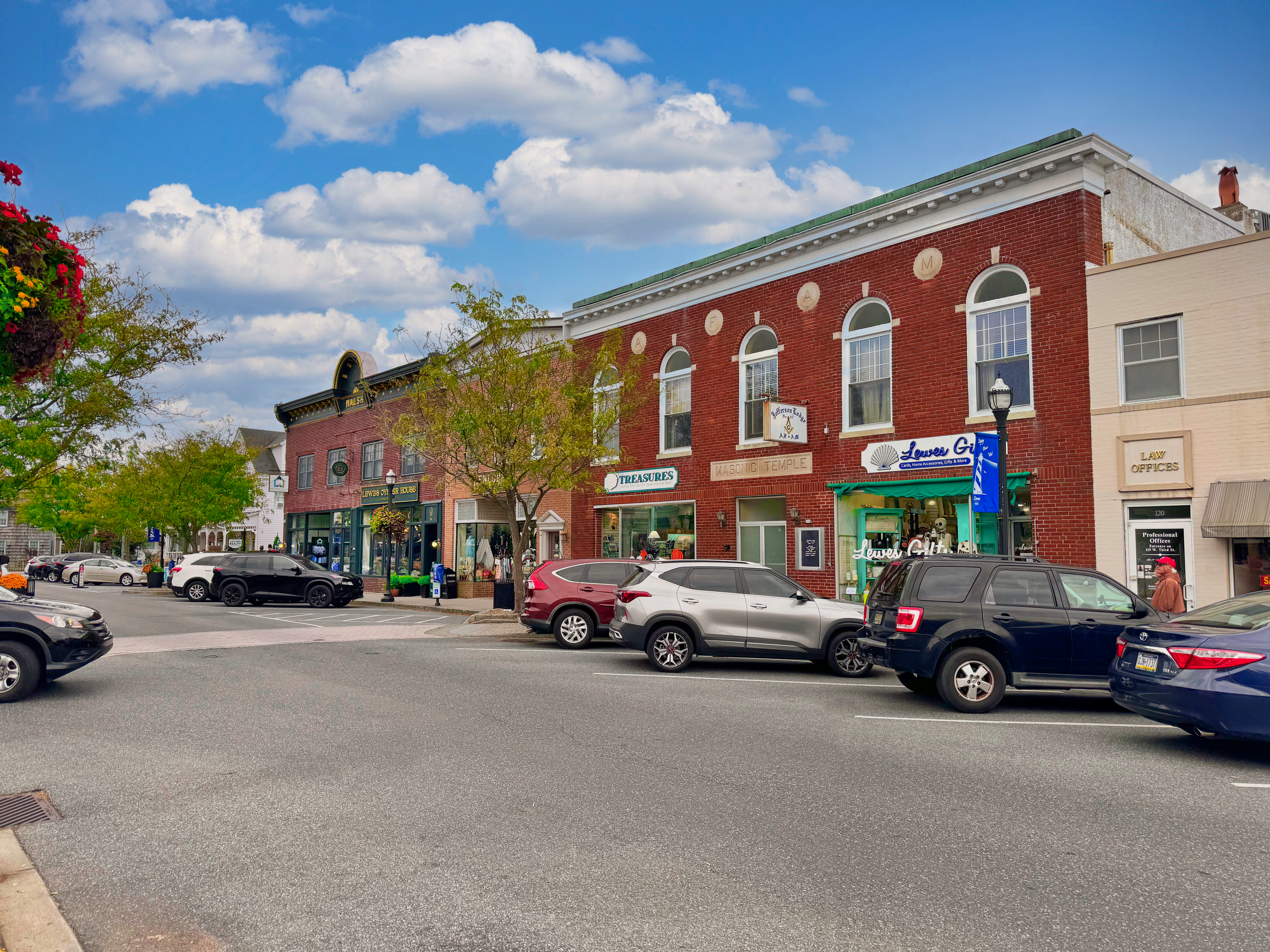
- Second Street in downtown Lewes

- Flag Seal
- Nicknames: First Town, First State
- Motto: "The First Town in The First State"
- Location of Lewes in Sussex County, Delaware.

- Location within the state of Delaware Lewes (the United States)
- Coordinates: 38°46′28″N 75°08′22″W
- Country: United States
- State: Delaware
- County: Sussex
- Founded: June 3, 1631
- Incorporated: February 2, 1818

Government
  - Mayor: Amy L. Marasco

Area
  - Total: 5.12 sq mi (13.25 km^{2})
  - Land: 4.19 sq mi (10.86 km^{2})
  - Water: 0.92 sq mi (2.39 km^{2})
- Elevation: 13 ft (4.0 m)

Population (2020)
  - Total: 3,303
  - Density: 787.9/sq mi (304.21/km^{2})
- Demonym: Lewesian
- Time zone: UTC−5 (Eastern (EST))
  - Summer (DST): UTC−4 (EDT)
- ZIP code: 19958
- Area code: 302
- FIPS code: 10-41830
- GNIS feature ID: 214214
- Website: ci.lewes.de.us

Lewes (/ˈluː.əs/ LOO-əss) is an incorporated city on the Delaware Bay in eastern Sussex County, Delaware, United States. According to the 2020 census, its population was 3,303. Along with neighboring Rehoboth Beach, Lewes is one of the principal cities of Delaware's rapidly growing Cape Region. The city lies within the Salisbury, Maryland–Delaware Metropolitan Statistical Area. Lewes proudly claims to be "The First Town in The First State."

== History ==
Lewes was the site of the first European settlement in Delaware, a whaling and trading post that Dutch settlers founded on June 3, 1631, and named Zwaanendael (Swan Valley). The colony had a short existence, as a local tribe of Lenape Indians killed all 32 settlers in 1632.

The area remained rather neglected by the Dutch until, under the threat of annexation from the Colony of Maryland, the city of Amsterdam made a grant of land at the Hoernkills (the area around Cape Henlopen, near the current town of Lewes) to a group of Mennonites for settlement in 1662. A total of 35 men were to be included in the settlement, led by a Pieter Cornelisz Plockhoy of Zierikzee and funded by a sizable loan from the city to get them established. 41 persons came with Plockhoy from the Netherlands to the Hoernkill on board the Dutch ship the Sint Jacob, one of whom was Otto Wolgast from the town of Wolgast, Pomerania. The settlement was established in 1663, and lasted until the very next year; in 1664, the English captured New Netherland from the Dutch, and they ordered the settlement razed with reports indicating that "not even a nail" was left there.

The Dutch colonists proved slow to regroup, but a new settlement gradually regrew around the Hoernkills. In late December 1673, when the area was briefly held again by the Dutch, the settlement was attacked and burned down again by a group of Maryland colonists. In 1680, under the authority of the Duke of York, who had been granted such authority by his brother, King Charles II, the village (and county) was reorganized and known for two years as New Deale, Deale County, Delaware. A log courthouse was authorized to be built at this time. An Anglican congregation was established by 1681 and a Presbyterian church was built in 1682.

In 1682, the Delaware colonies were given to William Penn by King Charles II as payment for a family debt. When Penn arrived in the New World later that year, he renamed the county as Sussex and the Hoernkills settlement as Lewes, in commemoration of the county and town in England. Lewes became and remained the county seat of Sussex County until 1791, when it was moved to a more west-central county location, the current town of Georgetown. The town was also known as "Lewistown" or "Lewestown".

On April 6 and 7, 1813, during the War of 1812, Royal Navy vessels led by HMS Poictiers under the command of Captain Sir John Beresford briefly and ineffectually bombarded the town. A cannonball from the bombardment is lodged in the foundation of Cannonball House, which now serves as the town's maritime museum.

Lewes was incorporated by an act of the state assembly on Feb. 2, 1818. The act provided for five persons to be chosen as commissioners to be known as "Trustees of the Town of Lewes."

In 1941, the United States built Fort Miles on Cape Henlopen, immediately east of Lewes, to defend Delaware Bay and the Delaware River and the oil refineries and factories on its shores, as well as the city of Philadelphia.

Fort Miles never saw any major action; except for range practice, it fired its guns only once between its establishment and the end of World War II. Fort Miles ceased operation altogether in 1991 and was deeded to the State of Delaware.

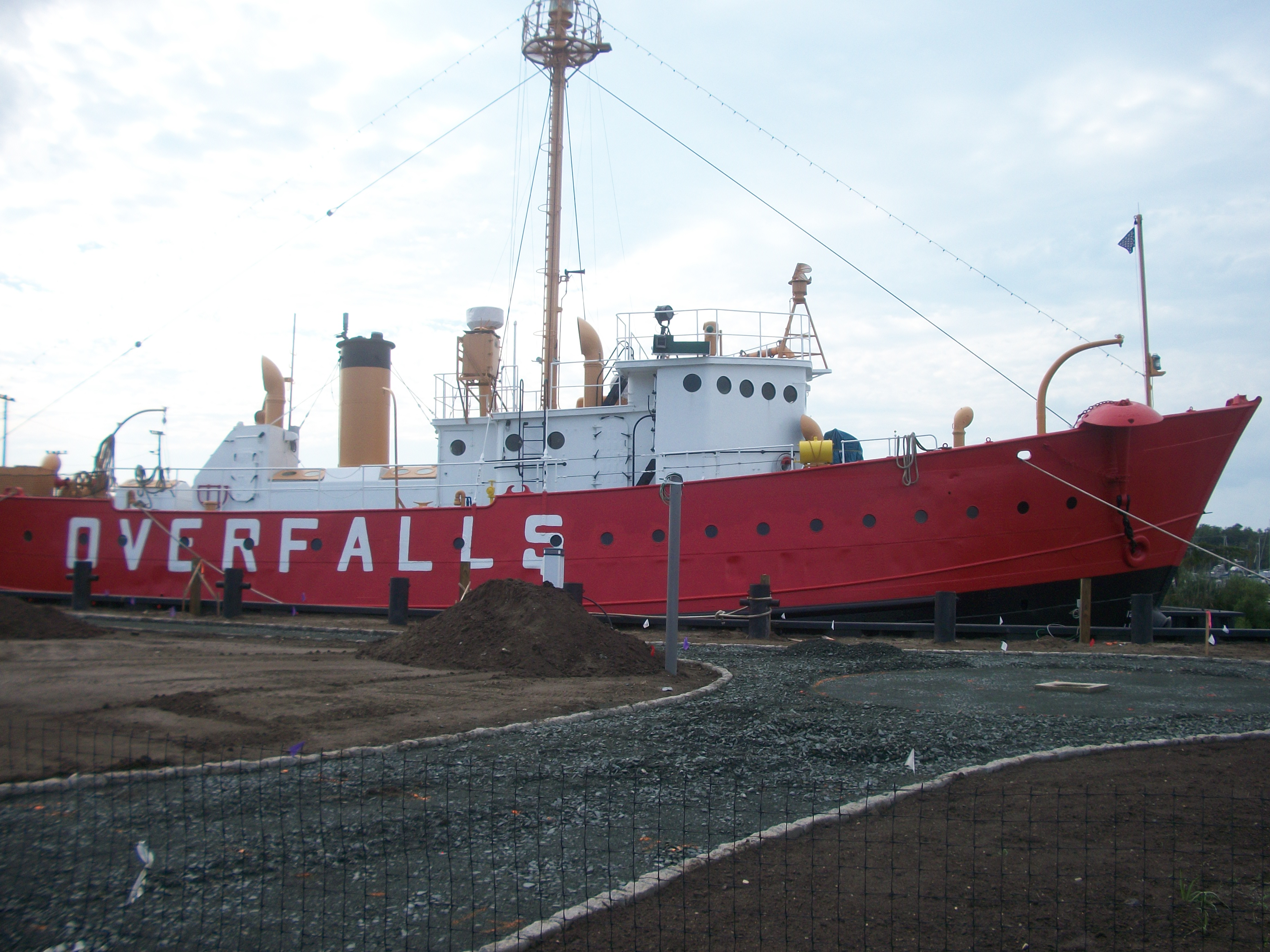
Lightship Overfalls, preserved as a tourist attraction.

In addition to Fort Miles, the Cape Henlopen Archeological District, Coleman House, Cool Spring Presbyterian Church, De Vries Palisade, Delaware Breakwater and Lewes Harbor, Fisher Homestead, Fisher's Paradise, Col. David Hall House, Hopkins Covered Bridge Farm, Lewes Historic District, Lewes Presbyterian Church, Lightship WAL 539, Maull House, National Harbor of Refuge and Delaware Breakwater Harbor Historic District, Pagan Creek Dike, Roosevelt Inlet Shipwreck, William Russell House, St. George's Chapel, Lewes, Townsend Site, and Wolfe's Neck Site are listed on the National Register of Historic Places.

=== Home to governors ===
Six men who served as Delaware governor were born in or made their home in Lewes. Three of those men lived on Lewes' Second Street. Brothers Daniel and Caleb Rodney, sons of John Rodney, first cousin of Caesar Rodney, each served as governor of Delaware. Each a member of the Federalist Party, Daniel served from 1814 to 1817, while Caleb served as acting governor from 1822 to 1823. Ebe Walters Tunnell moved to Lewes in 1873 to enter the drug and hardware business in part of the old Caleb Rodney House on Second Street. Tunnell worked his way up the state government hierarchy before unsuccessfully running for governor in 1892. Four years later, the Democrat won the election, and served from 1897 to 1901.

=== City motto and name ===
As Lewes was the earliest settlement in the state, and Delaware was the first state to ratify the Constitution, the town refers to itself as "The First Town in the First State." Lewes is named after the town of Lewes in England, which is situated in a county named Sussex (from which Sussex County, Delaware, takes its name). Lewes, Sussex, England, also has the same seal.

== Geography ==
Lewes is located at 38°46′28″N 75°08′22″W (38.7745565, –75.1393498).

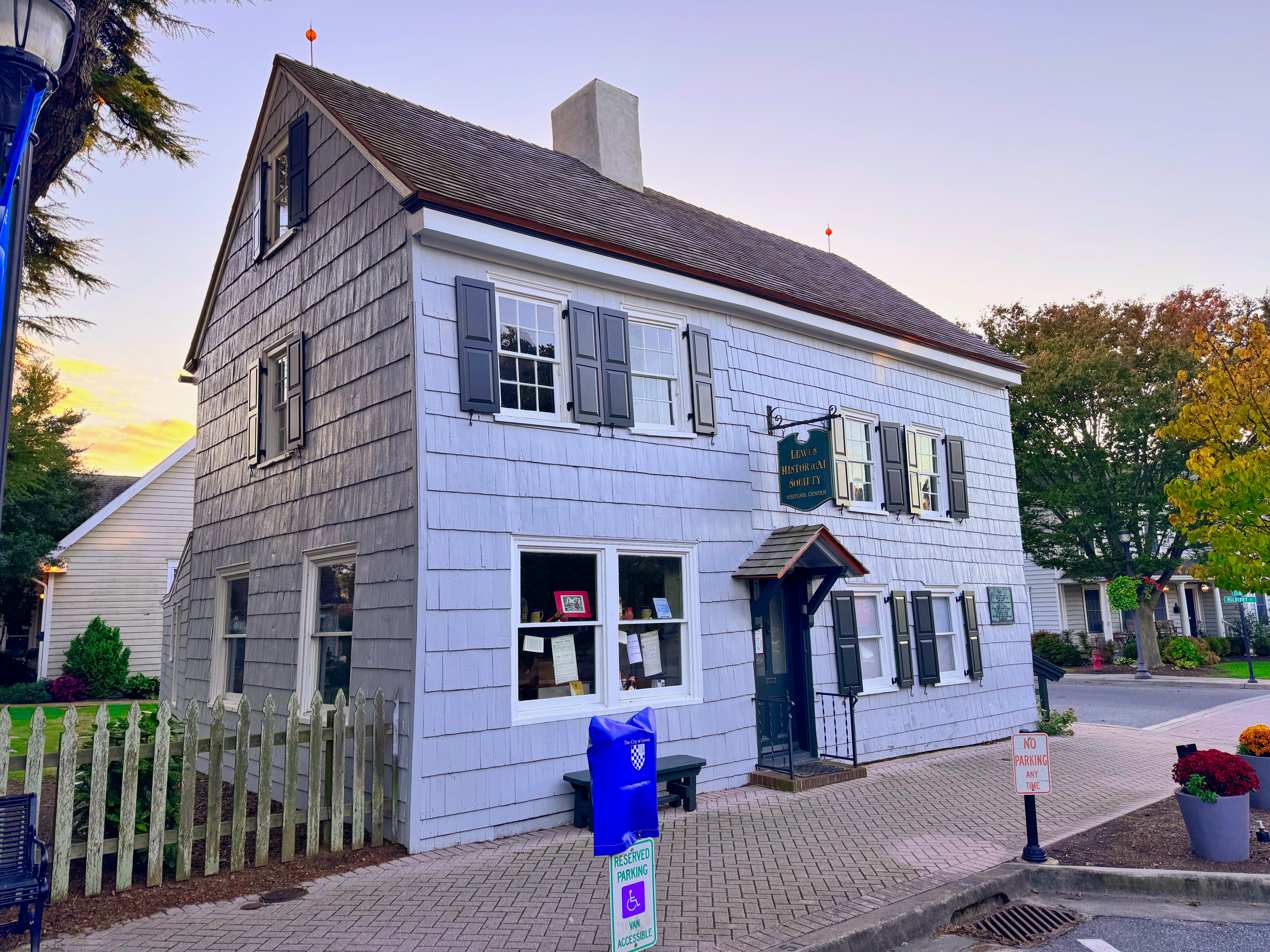
1655 Ryves Holt House, the oldest structure in Delaware

According to the United States Census Bureau, the city has a total area of 4.3 square miles (11 km^{2}), of which 3.7 mi^{2} (9.6 km^{2}) is land, and 0.6 mi^{2} (1.6 km^{2}) (14.7%) is water.

=== Climate ===
Climate chart for Lewes

Situated on the Atlantic Coastal Plain, Lewes's weather is moderated by the Atlantic Ocean and the Delaware Bay. Lewes has a mild humid subtropical climate (Cfa) consisting of hot, humid summers and mild winters. The average daytime high in July is 87.7 °F (30.9 °C) and a low of 70.6 °F (21.4 °C); in January, the average high is 46.2 °F (7.9 °C) with an average low of 30.2 °F (−1.0 °C). The month of highest average rainfall is July with 4.95 inches (125.7 mm) of rain, while February is historically the driest month, receiving an average of only 3.17 inches (80.5 mm) of rain.

The highest official temperature ever recorded in Lewes was 102 °F (38.9 °C) in 1997. The lowest official temperature ever recorded in Lewes was −11 °F (−23.9 °C) in 1982.

Climate data for Lewes, Delaware (1991–2020 normals, extremes 1945–present)
Month	Jan	Feb	Mar	Apr	May	Jun	Jul	Aug	Sep	Oct	Nov	Dec	Year
Record high °F (°C)	78 (26)	86 (30)	89 (32)	92 (33)	97 (36)	102 (39)	101 (38)	101 (38)	98 (37)	92 (33)	88 (31)	77 (25)	102 (39)
Mean maximum °F (°C)	67.4 (19.7)	68.3 (20.2)	76.1 (24.5)	84.1 (28.9)	89.4 (31.9)	94.9 (34.9)	96.8 (36.0)	95.3 (35.2)	89.2 (31.8)	82.7 (28.2)	74.7 (23.7)	67.5 (19.7)	97.8 (36.6)
Mean daily maximum °F (°C)	46.2 (7.9)	48.1 (8.9)	55.2 (12.9)	66.2 (19.0)	74.6 (23.7)	83.4 (28.6)	87.7 (30.9)	85.5 (29.7)	79.6 (26.4)	69.3 (20.7)	58.7 (14.8)	49.9 (9.9)	67.0 (19.4)
Daily mean °F (°C)	38.2 (3.4)	40.0 (4.4)	46.3 (7.9)	56.3 (13.5)	65.3 (18.5)	74.5 (23.6)	79.2 (26.2)	77.3 (25.2)	71.7 (22.1)	60.9 (16.1)	50.4 (10.2)	42.4 (5.8)	58.5 (14.7)
Mean daily minimum °F (°C)	30.2 (−1.0)	31.9 (−0.1)	37.5 (3.1)	46.4 (8.0)	56.0 (13.3)	65.7 (18.7)	70.6 (21.4)	69.2 (20.7)	63.7 (17.6)	52.4 (11.3)	42.2 (5.7)	35.0 (1.7)	50.1 (10.1)
Mean minimum °F (°C)	14.2 (−9.9)	17.5 (−8.1)	22.2 (−5.4)	33.1 (0.6)	43.3 (6.3)	53.2 (11.8)	61.6 (16.4)	59.2 (15.1)	50.2 (10.1)	37.3 (2.9)	27.0 (−2.8)	19.3 (−7.1)	12.2 (−11.0)
Record low °F (°C)	−11 (−24)	0 (−18)	9 (−13)	18 (−8)	27 (−3)	39 (4)	47 (8)	47 (8)	37 (3)	26 (−3)	16 (−9)	0 (−18)	−11 (−24)
Average precipitation inches (mm)	3.38 (86)	3.17 (81)	4.21 (107)	3.45 (88)	3.38 (86)	3.77 (96)	4.95 (126)	4.31 (109)	4.49 (114)	4.41 (112)	3.59 (91)	4.17 (106)	47.28 (1,201)
Average snowfall inches (cm)	2.0 (5.1)	6.5 (17)	1.0 (2.5)	0.0 (0.0)	0.0 (0.0)	0.0 (0.0)	0.0 (0.0)	0.0 (0.0)	0.0 (0.0)	0.0 (0.0)	0.0 (0.0)	1.0 (2.5)	10.5 (27)
Average precipitation days (≥ 0.01 in)	11.1	10.0	11.2	11.3	10.9	9.5	10.4	9.1	8.9	9.8	10.4	11.5	124.1
Average snowy days (≥ 0.1 in)	0.9	1.2	0.4	0.0	0.0	0.0	0.0	0.0	0.0	0.0	0.0	0.4	2.9
Source: NOAA

Climate data for Lewes, Delaware (Ocean Water Temperature)
Month	Jan	Feb	Mar	Apr	May	Jun	Jul	Aug	Sep	Oct	Nov	Dec	Year
Daily mean °F (°C)	37 (3)	36 (2)	41 (5)	51 (11)	60 (16)	68 (20)	73 (23)	76 (24)	72 (22)	62 (17)	52 (11)	44 (7)	56 (13)
Source: NOAA

== Demographics ==
Historical population
Census	Pop.	Note	%±
1870	1,090		—
1900	2,259		—
1910	2,158		−4.5%
1920	2,074		−3.9%
1930	1,923		−7.3%
1940	2,246		16.8%
1950	2,904		29.3%
1960	3,025		4.2%
1970	2,563		−15.3%
1980	2,197		−14.3%
1990	2,295		4.5%
2000	2,932		27.8%
2010	2,747		−6.3%
2020	3,303		20.2%
U.S. Decennial Census

=== 2020 census ===
As of the 2020 census, Lewes had a population of 3,303. The median age was 65.3 years. 9.1% of residents were under the age of 18 and 50.8% of residents were 65 years of age or older. For every 100 females there were 85.1 males, and for every 100 females age 18 and over there were 83.2 males age 18 and over.

99.1% of residents lived in urban areas, while 0.9% lived in rural areas.

There were 1,672 households in Lewes, of which 10.6% had children under the age of 18 living in them. Of all households, 49.5% were married-couple households, 14.8% were households with a male householder and no spouse or partner present, and 31.8% were households with a female householder and no spouse or partner present. About 37.5% of all households were made up of individuals and 23.5% had someone living alone who was 65 years of age or older.

There were 3,085 housing units, of which 45.8% were vacant. The homeowner vacancy rate was 2.0% and the rental vacancy rate was 32.8%.

Racial composition as of the 2020 census
Race	Number	Percent
White	2,960	89.6%
Black or African American	162	4.9%
American Indian and Alaska Native	8	0.2%
Asian	23	0.7%
Native Hawaiian and Other Pacific Islander	0	0.0%
Some other race	11	0.3%
Two or more races	139	4.2%
Hispanic or Latino (of any race)	75	2.3%

=== 2000 census ===
As of the 2000 census, there were 2,932 people, 1,338 households, and 797 families residing in the city. The population density was 801.5 inhabitants per square mile (309.5/km^{2}). There were 2,368 housing units at an average density of 647.3 per square mile (249.9/km^{2}). The racial makeup of the city was 87.3% White, 9.9% African American, 0.1% Native American, 1.0% Asian, <0.1% Pacific Islander, 0.7% from other races, and 0.9% from two or more races. Hispanic or Latino of any race were 1.7% of the population.

There were 1,338 households, out of which 15.1% had children under the age of 18 living with them, 49.3% were married couples living together, 8.4% had a female householder with no husband present, and 40.4% were non-families. 35.1% of all households were made up of individuals, and 14.4% had someone living alone who was 65 years of age or older. The average household size was 1.99 and the average family size was 2.53.

In the city, the population was spread out, with 13.6% under the age of 18, 3.7% from 18 to 24, 18.0% from 25 to 44, 31.5% from 45 to 64, and 33.1% who were 65 years of age or older. The median age was 55 years. For every 100 females, there were 78.2 males. For every 100 females age 18 and over, there were 76.1 males.

The median income for a household in the city was $66,387, and the median income for a family was $72,605. Males had a median income of $39,500 versus $35,227 for females. The per capita income for the city was $36,685. About 3.1% of families and 6.0% of the population were below the poverty line, including 11.3% of those under age 18 and 5.4% of those age 65 or over.

== Education ==
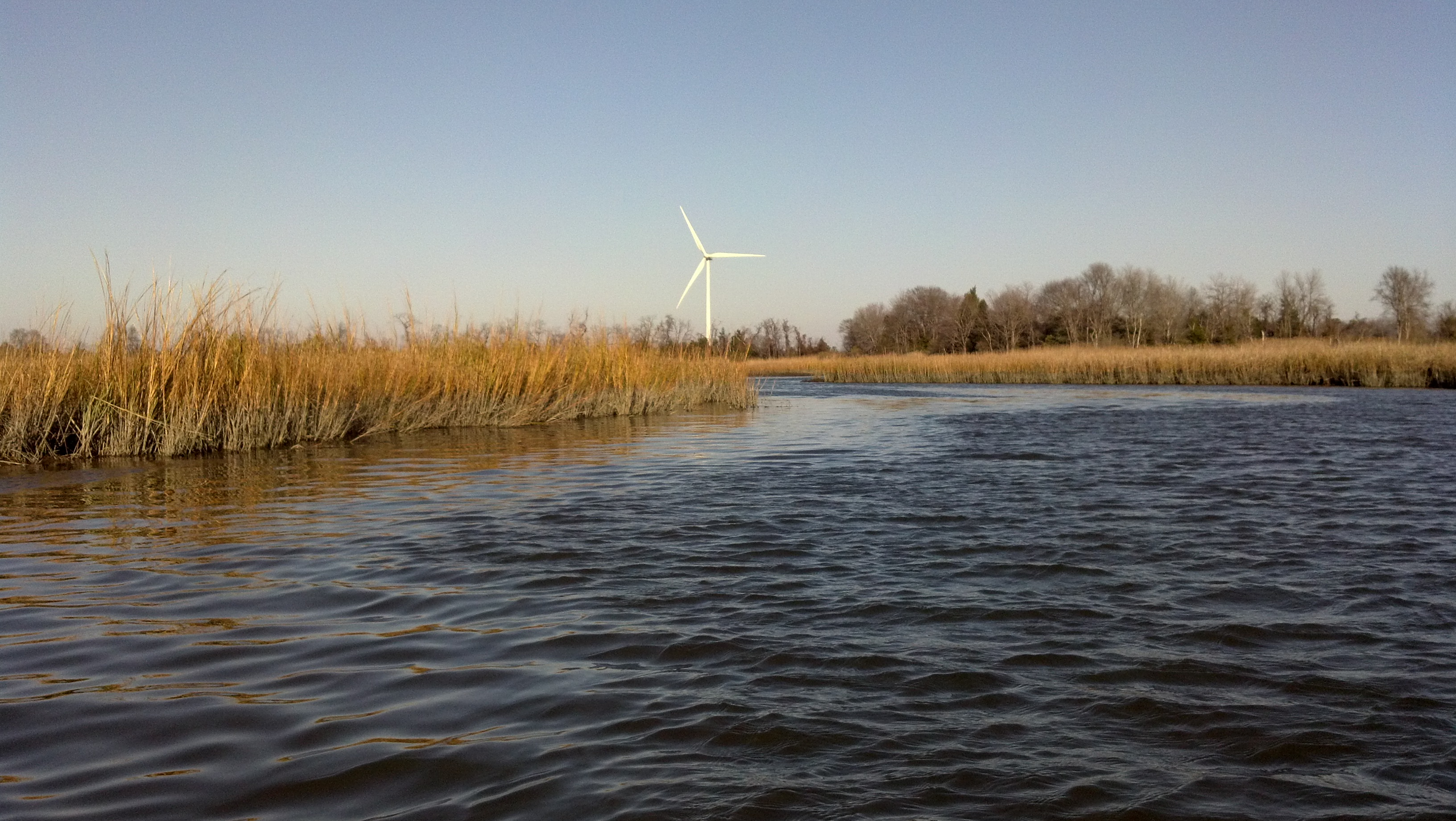
University of Delaware's wind turbine seen from Canary Creek

Lewes is served by the Cape Henlopen School District. The Lewes School District was consolidated into the Cape Henlopen district in 1969. Lewes is zoned to:

- Richard Shields Elementary School
- Cape Henlopen High School (in an unincorporated area with a Lewes address), the sole comprehensive high school of the district

Sussex Consortium, a school for students with autism previously in the former Lewes School, is now in an unincorporated area with a Lewes address.

The University of Delaware's Hugh R. Sharp Campus is also within the city. This is home to the university's College of Earth, Ocean, and Environment.

Lewes students are also eligible to enter Sussex Academy of Arts and Sciences, which is not in the city but is in the nearby city of Georgetown.

The Lewes School first opened as a multi-grade school in 1921 and became Lewes High School by 1946. It initially held Cape Henlopen High School when it opened in 1969. Lewes School will be repurposed as the new Richard A. Shields Elementary.

== Arts and culture ==
=== Museums and other points of interest ===
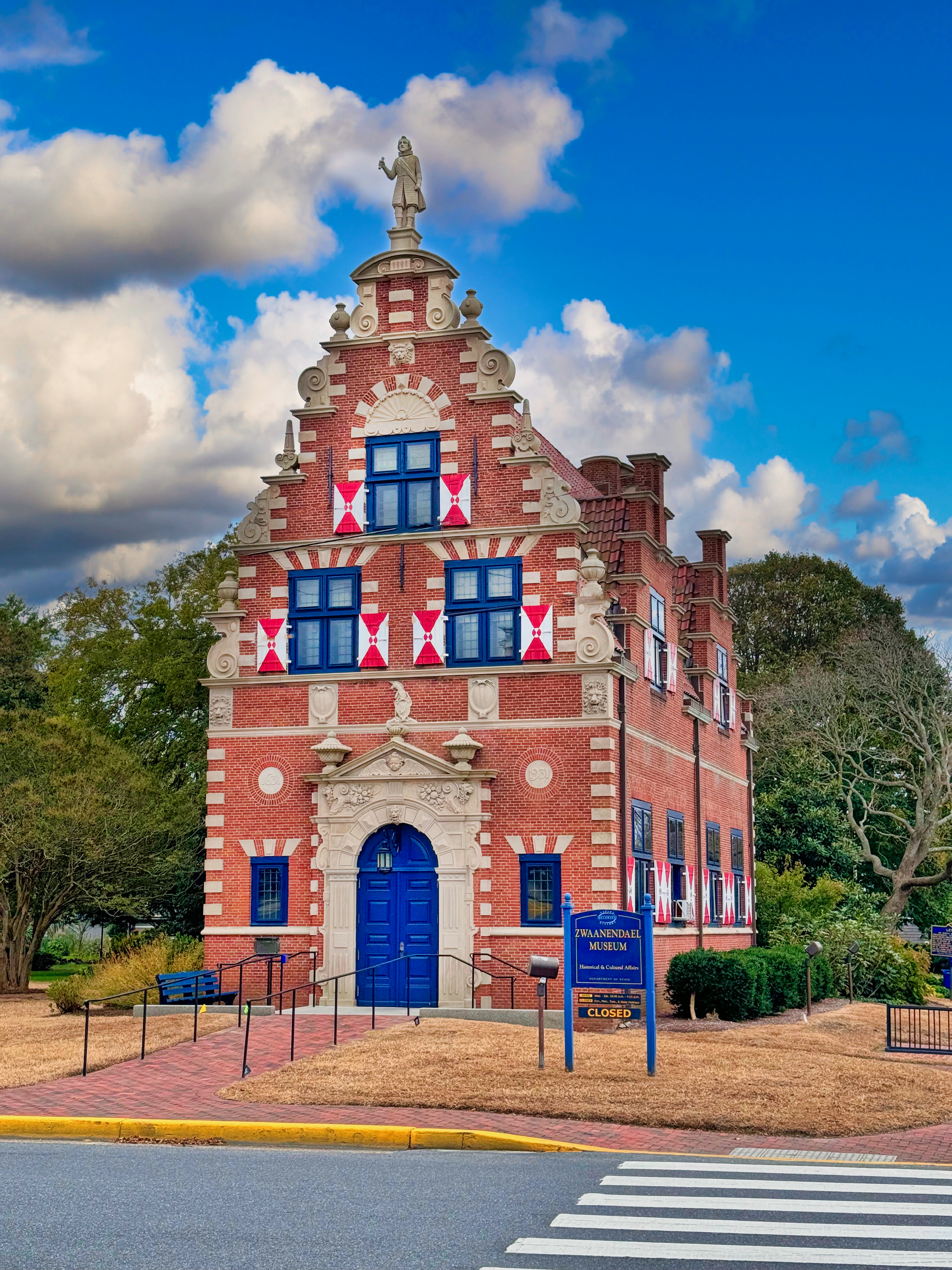
Based on the Statenlogement building in Hoorn, the Netherlands, used as a women's club starting 1930, now the Zwaanendael Museum

Lewes serves as a vacation and resort spot popular with residents of Washington, D.C., and the surrounding suburbs. Even though the city limits primarily sit on the lower reach of the Delaware Bay, it is nonetheless considered an ocean resort, particularly as the ocean is nearby at Cape Henlopen. Lewes is among those communities which have banned smoking in its public parks.

Lewes is the home of the Zwaanendael Museum, which features exhibits about Delaware's history. Savannah, Second and Front Streets are the town's main streets and have many shops, restaurants, parks and historical venues. Fisherman's Wharf is a dock that stretches along the Lewes and Rehoboth Canal. It features multiple restaurants and bait shops, and in season the dock hosts hundreds of boats from all over.

The Lewes Historical Society promotes the preservation, interpretation and cultural enrichment of the Lewes region through museum exhibits, educational programs, historical research and publications. Visitors can try colonial cocktails at the recreated Sussex Tavern, sing shanties at shanty nights, and learn about the town's rich history at the Historic Lewestown Campus.

Lewes in Bloom is an organization that promotes and maintains the beauty of Historic Lewes. Lewes in Bloom won America in Bloom's contest in 2003, 2005, 2010 and 2015 for cities with population under 5,000. In 2012 and 2015 Lewes in Bloom was honored in the AIB "Circle of Champions".

=== Lighthouses ===
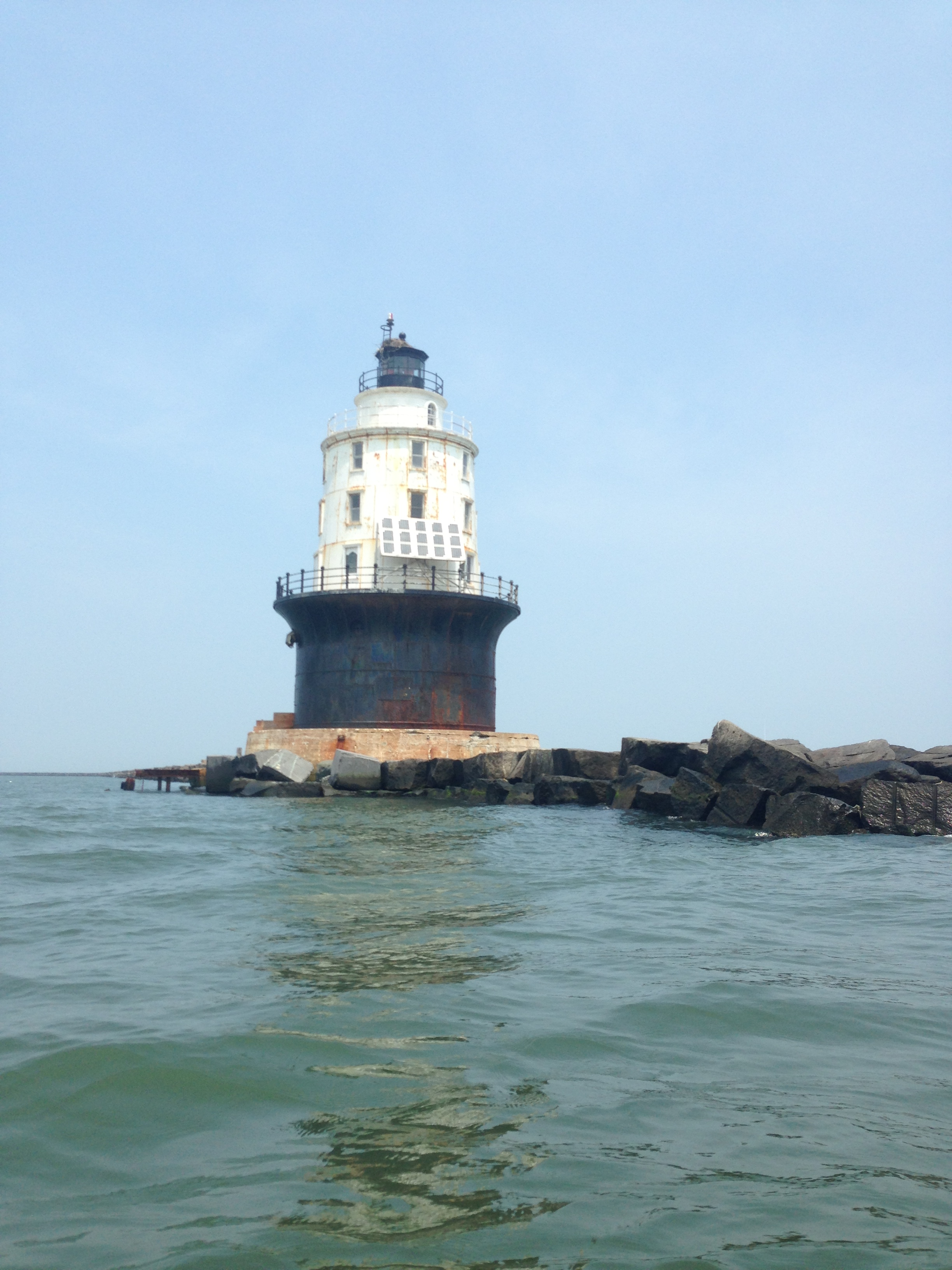
Lighthouse in the National Harbor of Refuge

United States Lightship Overfalls (LV-118/WAL-539), one of nine surviving lightships at museums in the United States, is moored in Lewes along the Lewes and Rehoboth Canal

Lewes is home to several iconic Lighthouses in the Delaware Bay. Just offshore lies the National Harbor of Refuge which is home to the Delaware Breakwater East End Light and the Harbor of Refuge Light.

== Parks and recreation ==
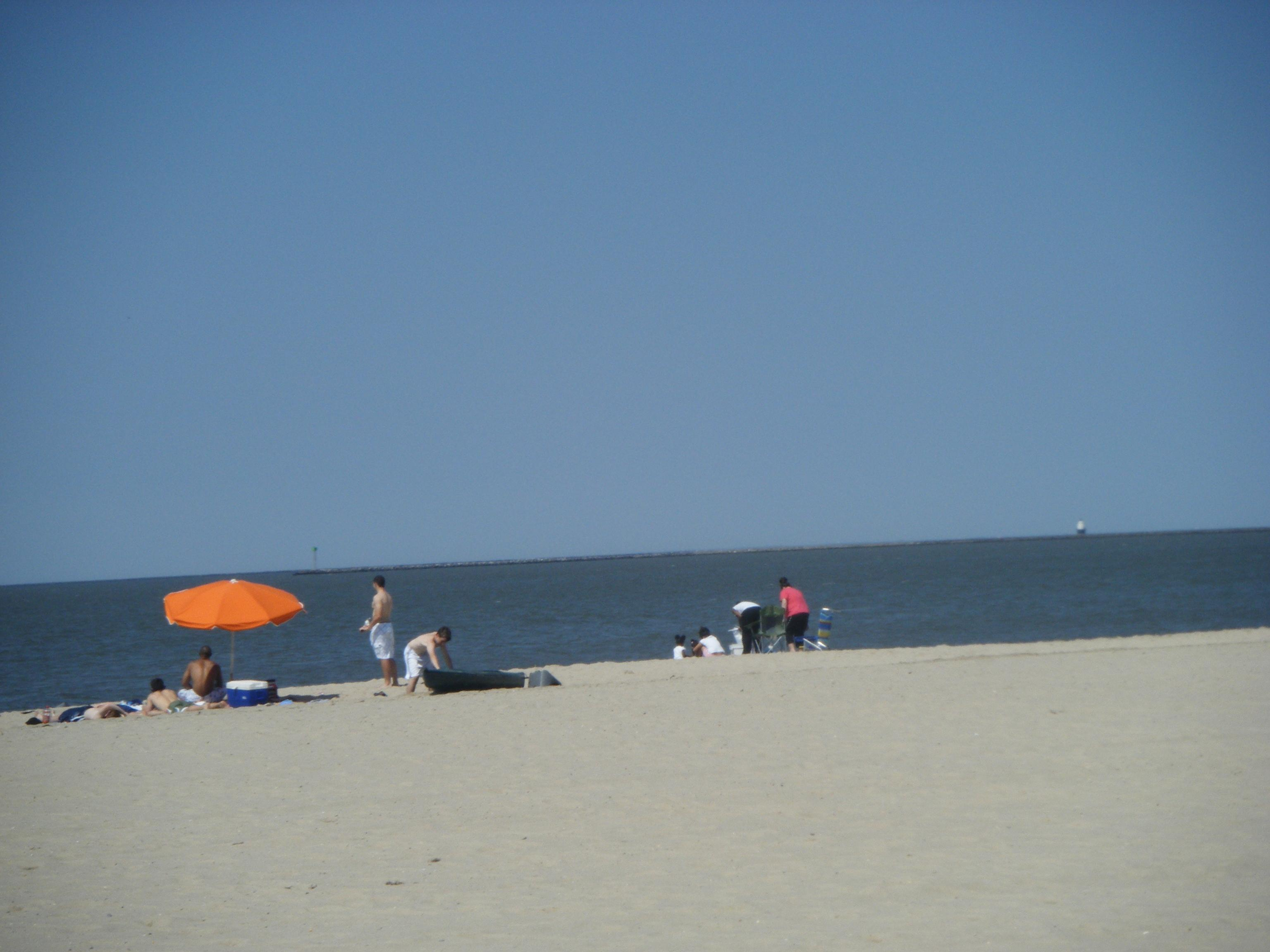
Lewes Beach on the Delaware Bay

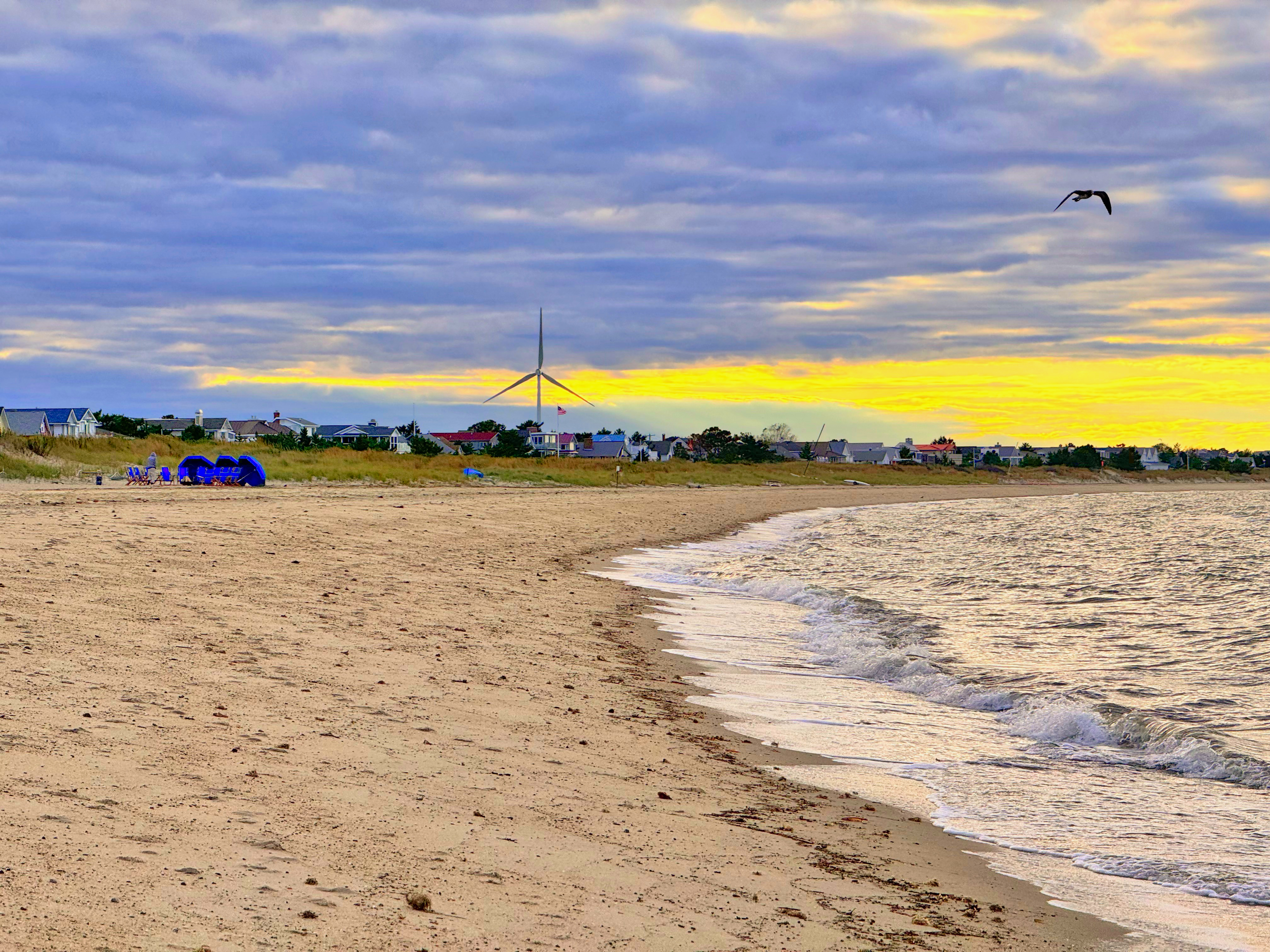
Lewes Beach in Delaware

Lewes is adjacent to Cape Henlopen State Park. Lewes also maintains several parks within the city limits:

- Blockhouse Pond Park
- Stango Park
- Zwaanendael Park & Herb Garden
- 1812 Memorial Park (Cannonball Park)
- Mary Vessels Park
- George H.P. Smith Park
- Canalfront Park & Marina
- Lewes Beach
- Great Marsh Park

DNREC maintains a boat ramp just outside the city limits along the Broadkill River, adjacent to the Roosevelt Inlet.

== Infrastructure ==
=== Law enforcement and emergency services ===
Lewes is primarily policed by the Lewes Police Department and Delaware State Police. For EMS Lewes is serviced by the Lewes Volunteer Fire Department. The town also see the occasional Delaware Natural Resource Police officer patrolling the waterways, and the state park. Lewes also has a United States Coast Guard Marine safety detachment

=== Transportation ===
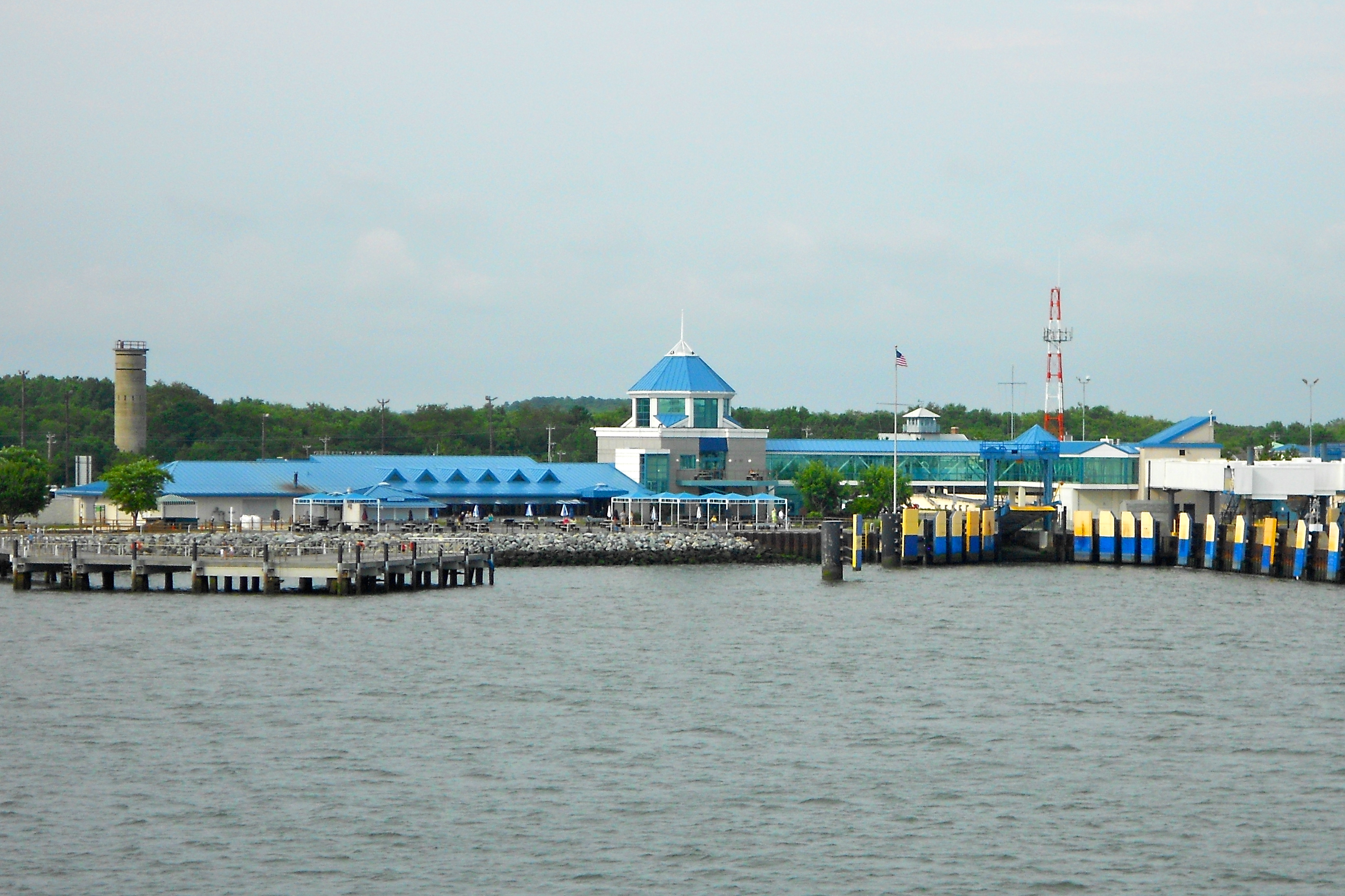
The Lewes terminal of the Cape May–Lewes Ferry

Delaware Route 1 (DE 1) passes just outside city limits at Five Points where DE 1, U.S. Route 9 (US 9), DE 404, DE 23 and DE 1D (Plantation Road) intersect. There are three main arterial roads that connect Lewes to DE 1: New Road, Savannah Road (US 9 Business) and King's Highway (US 9). US 9 passes to the southeast of downtown on the Theodore C. Freeman Memorial Highway. Parking meters are in effect for on-street parking and parking lots in the downtown area between May 1 and October 14 and at parking lots at Lewes Beach between May 1 and September 30.

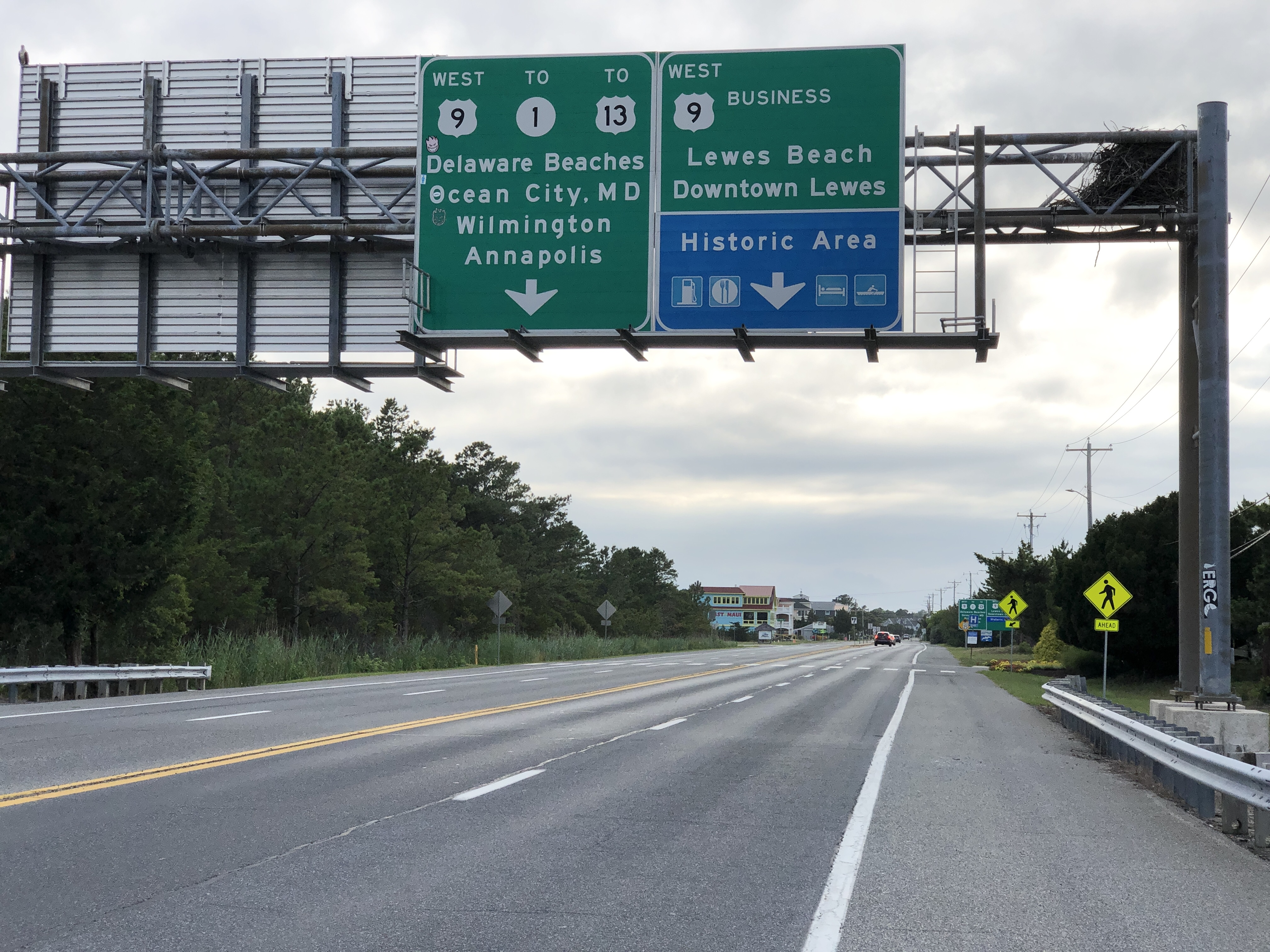
US 9 westbound approaching US 9 Bus. in Lewes

The southern terminus of the Cape May–Lewes Ferry is located in Lewes. The ferry provides passenger and automobile ferry service between southern Delaware and southern New Jersey, crossing the Delaware Bay to North Cape May, New Jersey, and serves as part of US 9. The ferry crossing is 17 miles (27 km) long and takes 85 minutes. Cape Water Tours & Taxi operates a round-trip water taxi service between Lewes and Dewey Beach via the Lewes and Rehoboth Canal on Friday evenings in the summer months, offering access to dining and nightlife in Dewey Beach.

DART First State operates the Lewes Transit Center park and ride just outside Lewes along DE 1. The transit center serves local bus routes providing service across Sussex County, with expanded Beach Bus service to the Delaware Beaches in the summer months, and inter-county bus service to other part of Delaware. This park and ride serves the Route 201 bus to the Rehoboth Beach Boardwalk, the Route 204 bus which heads along Savannah Road into Lewes to Cape Henlopen Drive and the Cape May–Lewes Ferry terminal and south to Rehoboth Beach, the Route 206 bus to Georgetown, and the Route 208 bus to Ocean City, Maryland. The Route 305 "Beach Connection" bus provides service on weekends and holidays in the summer to the Lewes Transit Center Park and Ride from Wilmington, the Christiana Mall, Middletown, and Dover. The Route 307 bus provides year-round service to Milford, Frederica, and Dover. The Delaware Department of Transportation built the Lewes Transit Center Park and Ride, with groundbreaking taking place on March 9, 2016, and the park and ride opening in May 2017. The Delaware River and Bay Authority operates a shuttle bus route in the summer months that connects the Cape May–Lewes Ferry to the Tanger Outlets and Rehoboth Beach. The city of Lewes formerly operated the Lewes Line bus service serving points of interest in the city daily from May to September.

Lewes was served by a branch of the Delaware Coast Line Railroad that originated in Georgetown, whereupon transfers could be made to trains north to Dover and Wilmington. Passenger trains operated on this branch by its predecessor company, the Pennsylvania Railroad, but ended between 1936 and 1938. The Maryland, Delaware & Virginia Railway operated a passenger train route from Lewes that followed a path to the north of the DCL route. It followed a path through Milton, Ellendale, Greenwood, crossing the state border into Maryland, then continuing further west to Love Point, whereupon travelers would connect with a ferry to Baltimore. This service was replaced by bus service by early 1932.

A rail with trail known as the Georgetown-Lewes Trail opened along the railroad line on October 19, 2016, with future plans to extend the trail to Georgetown. In 2017, it was announced the Delaware Coast Line Railroad would be abandoned between Cool Spring and Lewes after the swing bridge over the Lewes and Rehoboth Canal was closed due to being structurally unsound and repairs were determined to be too costly. The Junction and Breakwater Trail is a rail trail for bicyclists and hikers that connects Lewes and Rehoboth Beach, running 6 miles (9.7 km) mostly along a former Penn Central Railroad right-of-way.

=== Utilities ===
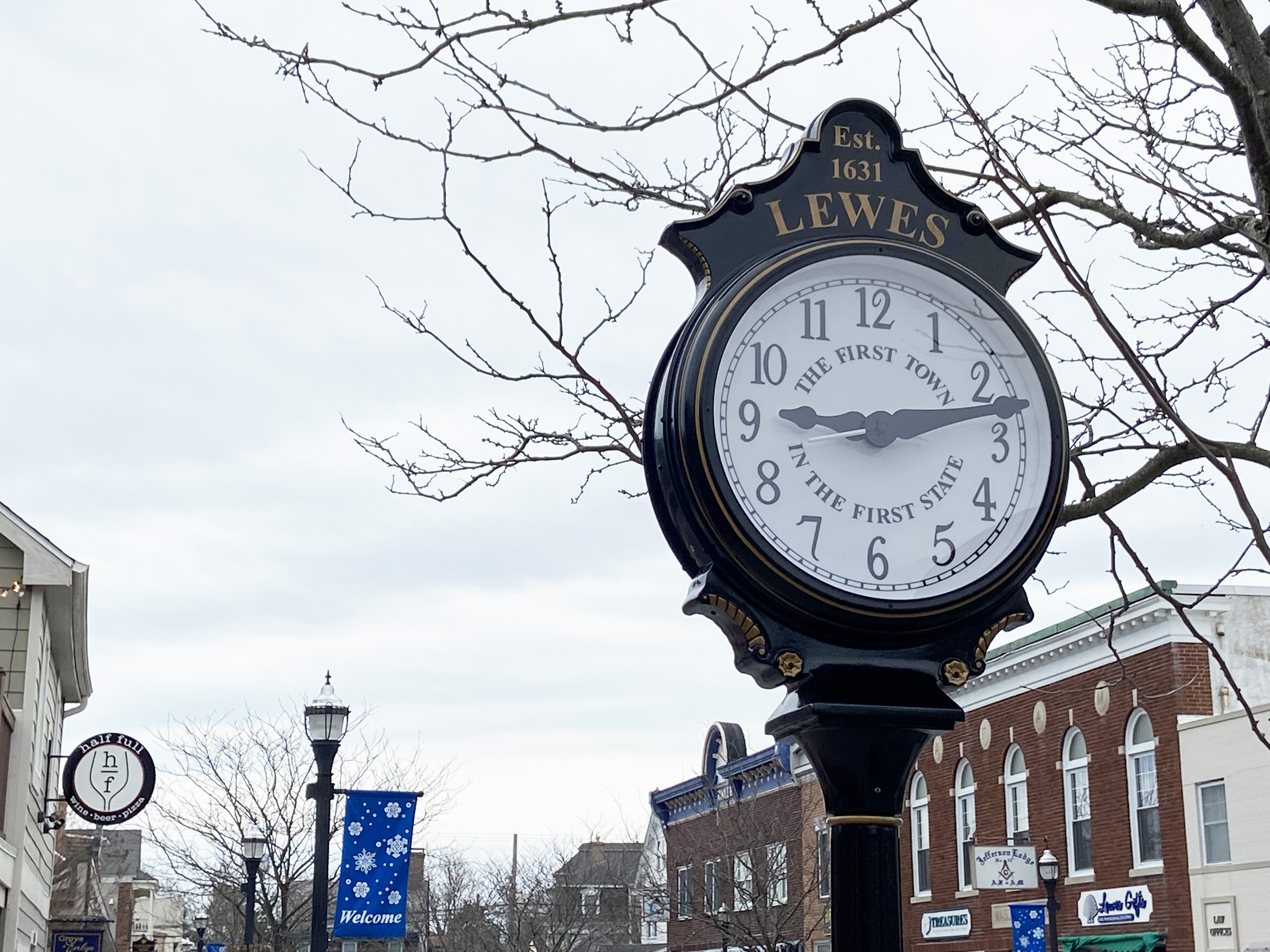
Lewes Town Clock

The Lewes Board of Public Works (BPW) provides electricity, water, and sewer service to the city. The BPW was established by an act of the Delaware General Assembly on March 15, 1901. Lewes formerly had a power plant that generated electricity for the city, but the plant's usage was reduced as the city brought in power from outside and the plant was shut down in the 1970s due to rising fuel costs. Lewes currently purchases power from Constellation which is transmitted to the city over Delmarva Power lines. The BPW is a member of the Delaware Municipal Electric Corporation. Trash collection is provided by the city while recycling collection is provided under contract by Republic Services. Natural gas service in Lewes is provided by Chesapeake Utilities.

=== Health care ===
Beebe Healthcare Medical Center is located in Lewes, founded in 1916 by the brothers, Drs. James Beebe and Richard C. Beebe. The hospital's name was changed to Beebe Healthcare in 2013 and 2016 marked its 100th anniversary.

== Notable people ==
- Eugene Bookhammer, 18th Lieutenant Governor of Delaware
- Jay Fleming, photographer
- David Hall, 15th Governor of Delaware
- Joseph Maull, 34th Governor of Delaware
- Adele Mears, field hockey player
- Pieter Corneliszoon Plockhoy, early Mennonite reformer and settler to Lewes in 1663
- Betsy Rawls, LPGA Tour professional golfer
- Caleb Rodney, 23rd Governor of Delaware
- Daniel Rodney, 19th Governor of Delaware
- Ebe W. Tunnell, 50th Governor of Delaware
- Matthew Wilson, patriot, pastor, surgeon, and educator
- John Wiltbank, politician
- Otto Wolgast, early settler to the Zwaanendael who helped found Lewes in 1663
- Mason Fluharty, baseball pitcher for the Toronto Blue Jays

== Notable events ==
On August 21, 2013, a helicopter reportedly dumped $10,000 in multiple dollar bill denominations over Lewes Harbor in the fulfillment of a deceased local resident's last wish.
