= Pagan Creek Dike =

- U.S. National Register of Historic Places
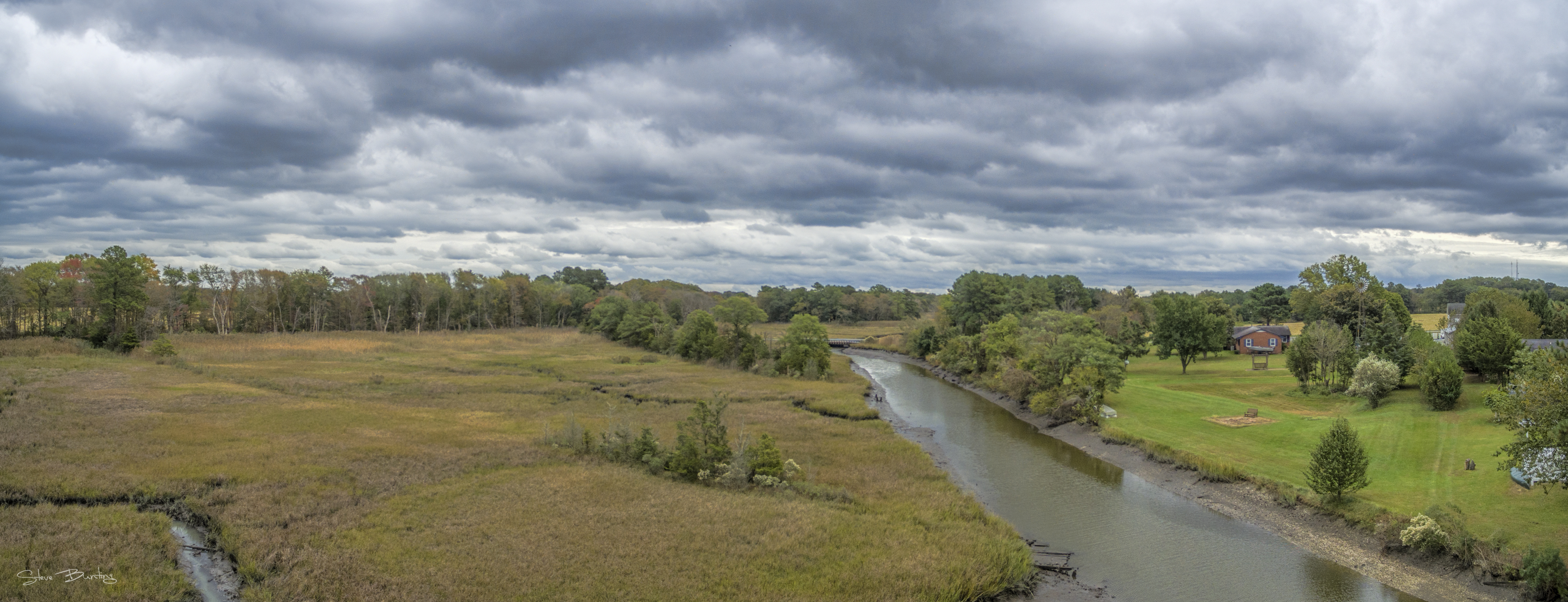

- Location within Delaware Location within the United States
- Location: Pagan Creek near New Rd., Lewes, Delaware
- Coordinates: 38°46′16″N 75°9′53″W
- Area: less than one acre
- NRHP reference No.: 73000555
- Added to NRHP: June 18, 1973

Pagan Creek Dike is a historic causeway located at Lewes, Sussex County, Delaware. It is about 700 feet (213.36 m) long, nine to ten feet (2.74 m – 3.05 meters) wide at the top, constructed of clay and loam piled atop a sand footing, which rests on marsh mud. In some places, the dike still rises about two feet above the level of the adjacent marsh. It is dated to the mid- to late-17th century, and is one of the oldest surviving road structures in Delaware. It was apparently built by the Dutch settlers to connect the Dutch West India Company fort with the hinterland beyond Pagan Creek.

Pagan Creek was the earliest known name for this body of water. It was later known as "Canarikill", which translates roughly as Canary Creek. The numerous Goldfinches in the area reminded the Dutch of canaries, hence the name. Kill means creek, basically, in Dutch. Over time, Canarikill became localized as Canarical, a name that persisted well into the mid to later 1900s by some locals. Eventually, the name evolved to Canary Creek, which is present on most modern maps.

The timbers of the dike (dyke), better thought of as a 'causeway', are in remarkably good condition and visible at low tide approximately 300 yards (0.27 km) west of the bridge over New Road. The entire reach of the dike is on private property. One can see the timbers at low tide by canoe or kayak, but even so the waters in the area are still privately owned.

It was added to the National Register of Historic Places in 1973.
