= Cape Henlopen Archeological District =

Archaeological site in Delaware, United States

- U.S. National Register of Historic Places
- U.S. Historic district
- Nearest city: Lewes, Delaware
- Area: 795 acres (322 ha)
- NRHP reference No.: 78000920
- Added to NRHP: November 21, 1978

Cape Henlopen Archeological District is a national historic district located near Lewes, Sussex County, Delaware. The district includes seven contributing sites. They are a discontinuous series of discrete shell middens of varying sizes and cultural affiliation. They date from approximately 500 B.C. to 1600 A.D.

It was added to the National Register of Historic Places in 1978.
