= Cape Region (Delaware) =

Coordinates: 38.7331°N 75.2439°W

Cape Region, Delaware
- Region
- Interactive map of Cape Region, Delaware
- Country: United States
- State: Delaware
- County: Sussex

Population (2010)
  - Total: 41,584
- Time zone: UTC-5 (Eastern (EST))
  - Summer (DST): UTC-4 (EDT)
- Area code: 302

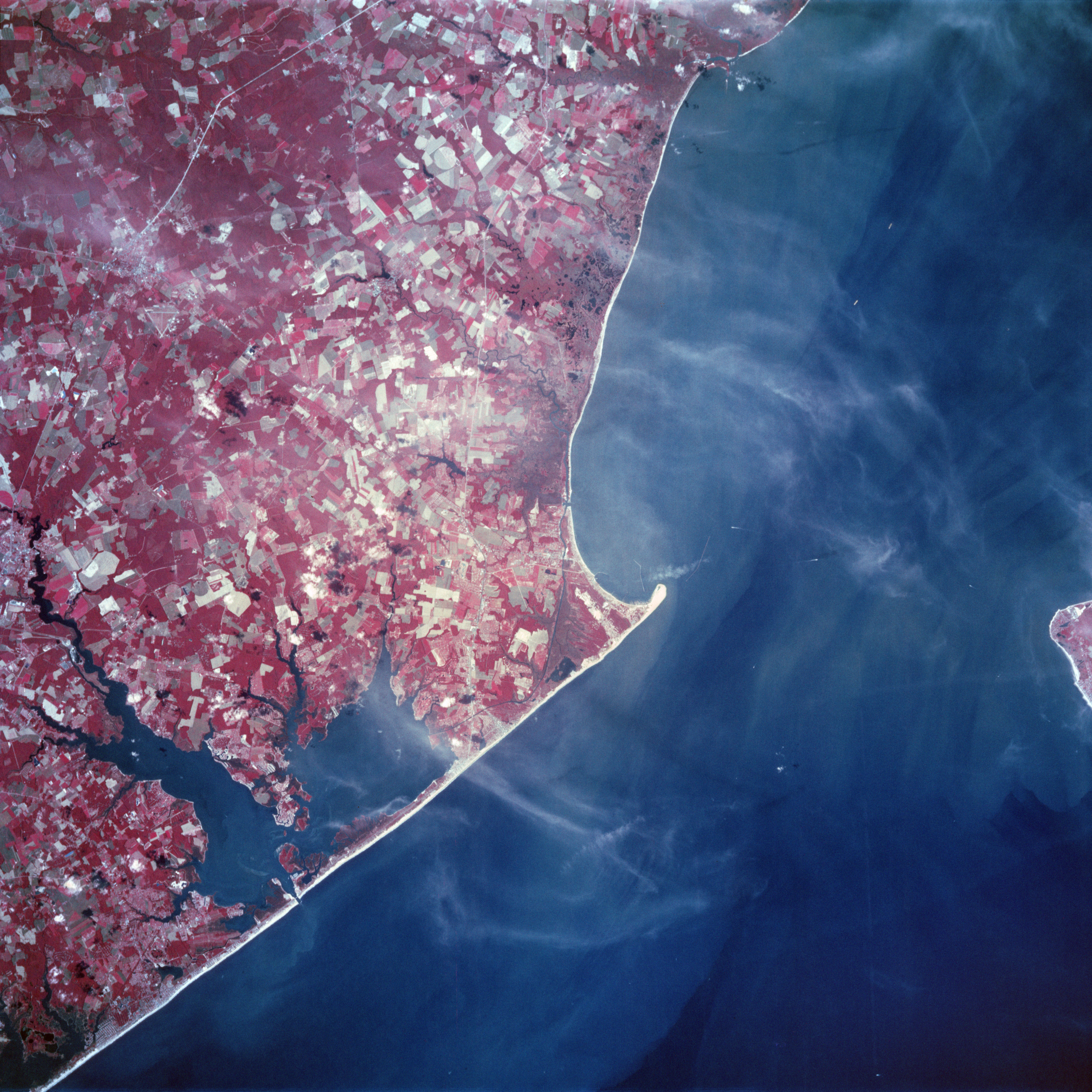
Aerial image of Delaware's Cape Region

The Cape Region is located in Sussex County

The Cape Henlopen Region, or the Cape Region, is a region in Sussex County, in southern Delaware, on the Delmarva Peninsula. The region is part of the Salisbury, Maryland-Delaware Metropolitan Statistical Area. The region takes its name from Cape Henlopen, as does the Cape Henlopen School District and Cape Henlopen State Park. Much of the region's populated areas are found along the Delaware Bay, Rehoboth Bay and the Atlantic Ocean. Northern and western parts of the Cape Region are rural areas dominated by farmland and wetlands. The area is often referred to as the Delaware Beaches.

== Geography ==
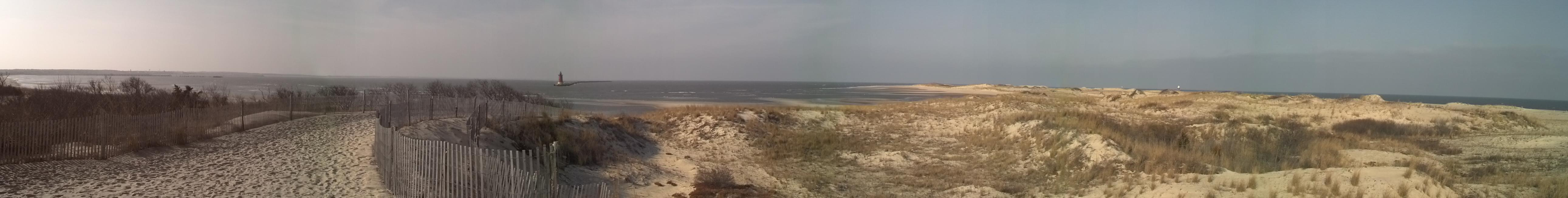
Cape Henlopen seen from Cape Henlopen State Park in Lewes

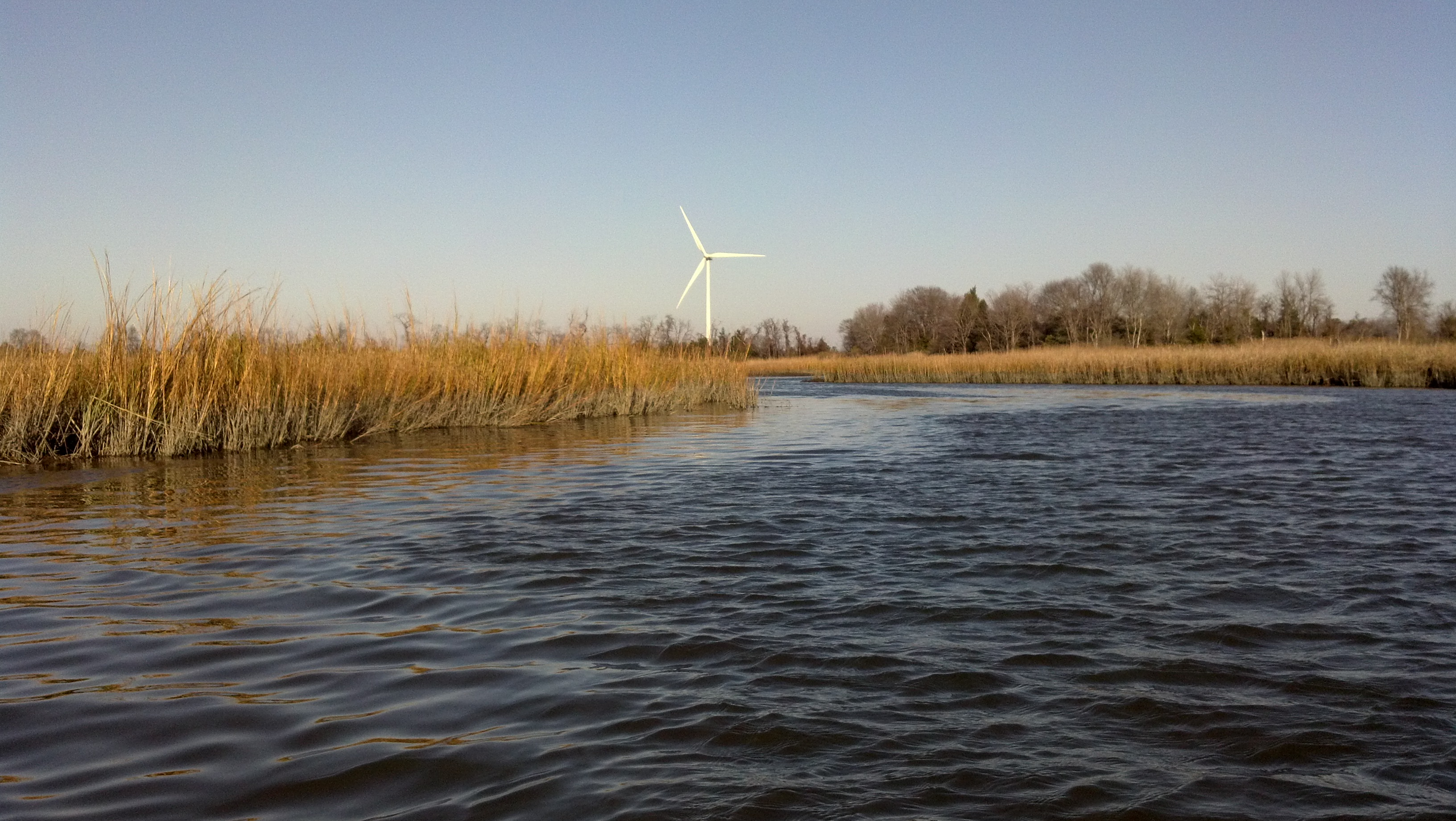
Wetlands seen along Canary Creek near Lewes.

The Cape Region is situated on the Atlantic Coastal Plain. A large portion of the region is low-lying Southern swamps and wetlands, notably found in Prime Hook National Wildlife Refuge, Cape Henlopen State Park, and along Delaware Route 1 within Delaware Seashore State Park. There are several navigable waterways that flow through the region:

  - Bald Eagle Creek
  - Broadkill River
  - Herring Creek
  - Lewes and Rehoboth Canal
  - Love Creek
  - Old Mill Creek
  - Red Mill Pond
  - Wagamons Pond
  - White Oak Creek

=== Climate ===
Situated on the Atlantic Coastal Plain, Rehoboth Beach's weather is moderated by the Atlantic Ocean, Delaware Bay and the Rehoboth Bay. Rehoboth Beach has a mild subtropical climate consisting of hot, humid summers and mild winters. The average daytime high in July is 87 °F (30.6 °C) and a low of 70 °F (21 °C); in January, the average high is 45 °F (7 °C) with an average low of 30 °F (-1 °C) The month of highest average rainfall is July with 4.78 inches of rain, while February is historically the driest month, receiving an average of only 3.23 inches (80.5 mm) of rain.

The highest official temperature ever recorded in Rehoboth Beach was 102 °F (38.8 °C) in 1997. The lowest official temperature ever recorded in Rehoboth Beach was -11 °F (-28.8 °C) in 1982.

== Communities ==
=== Cities ===
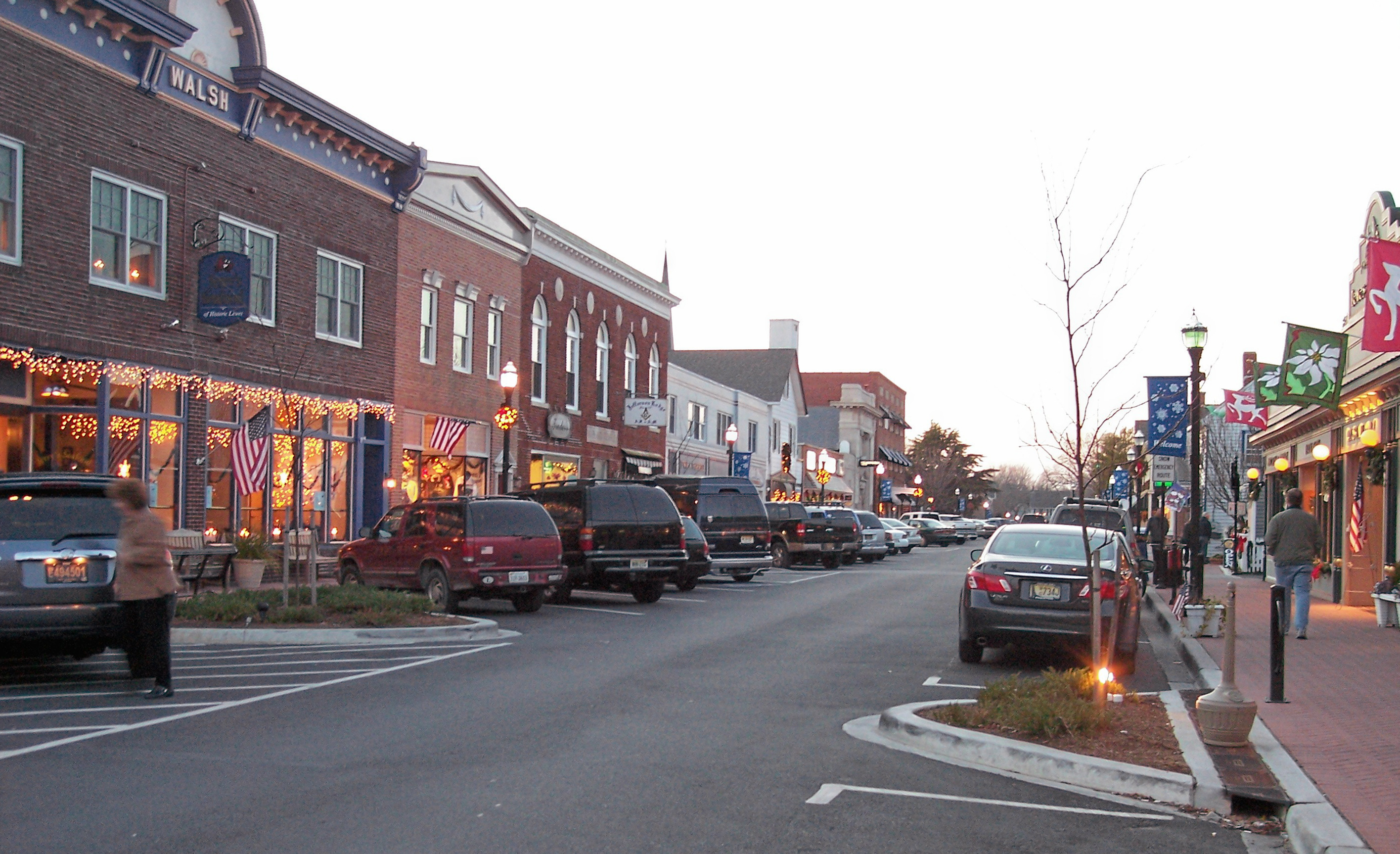
Lewes

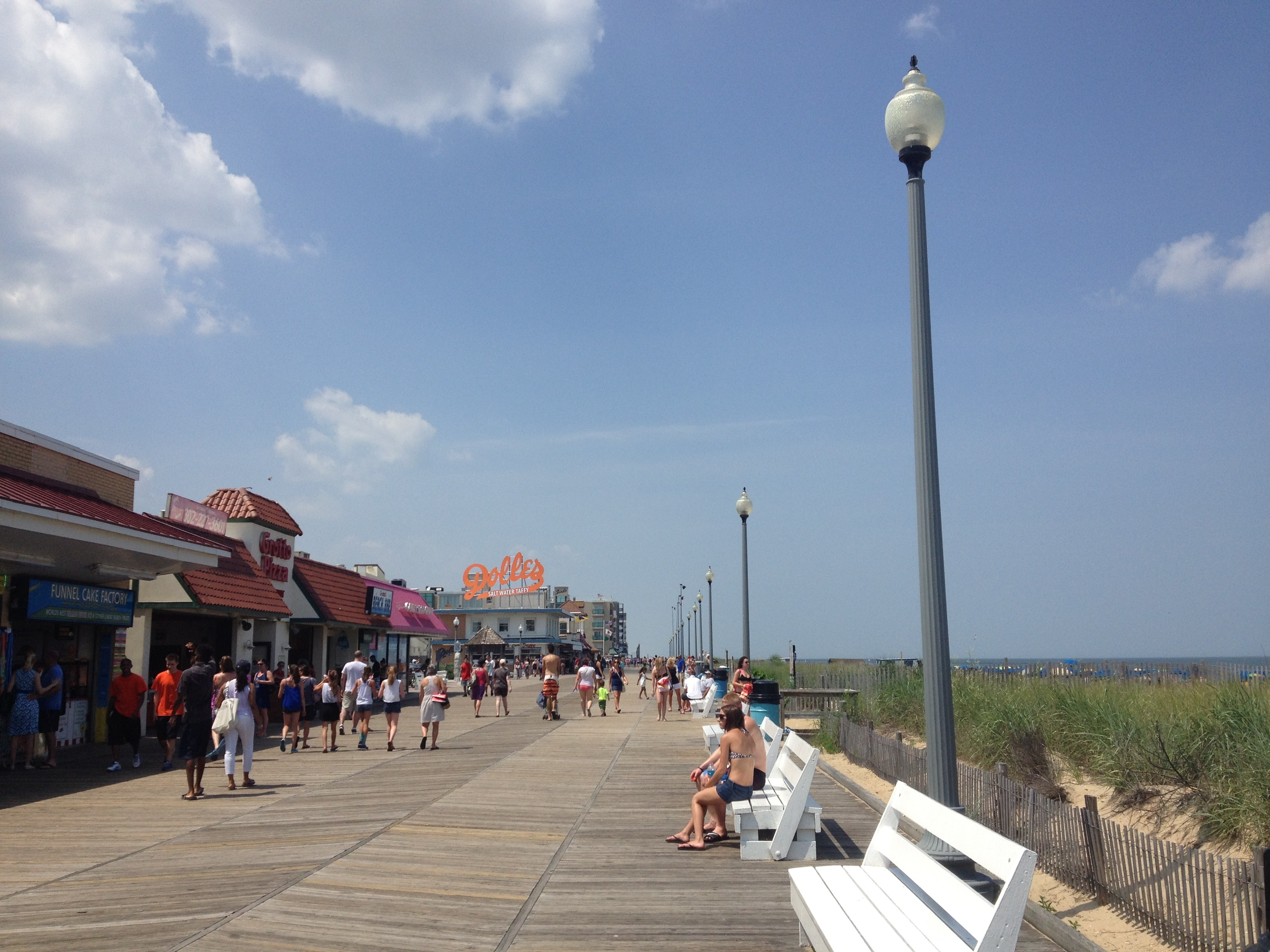
Rehoboth Beach

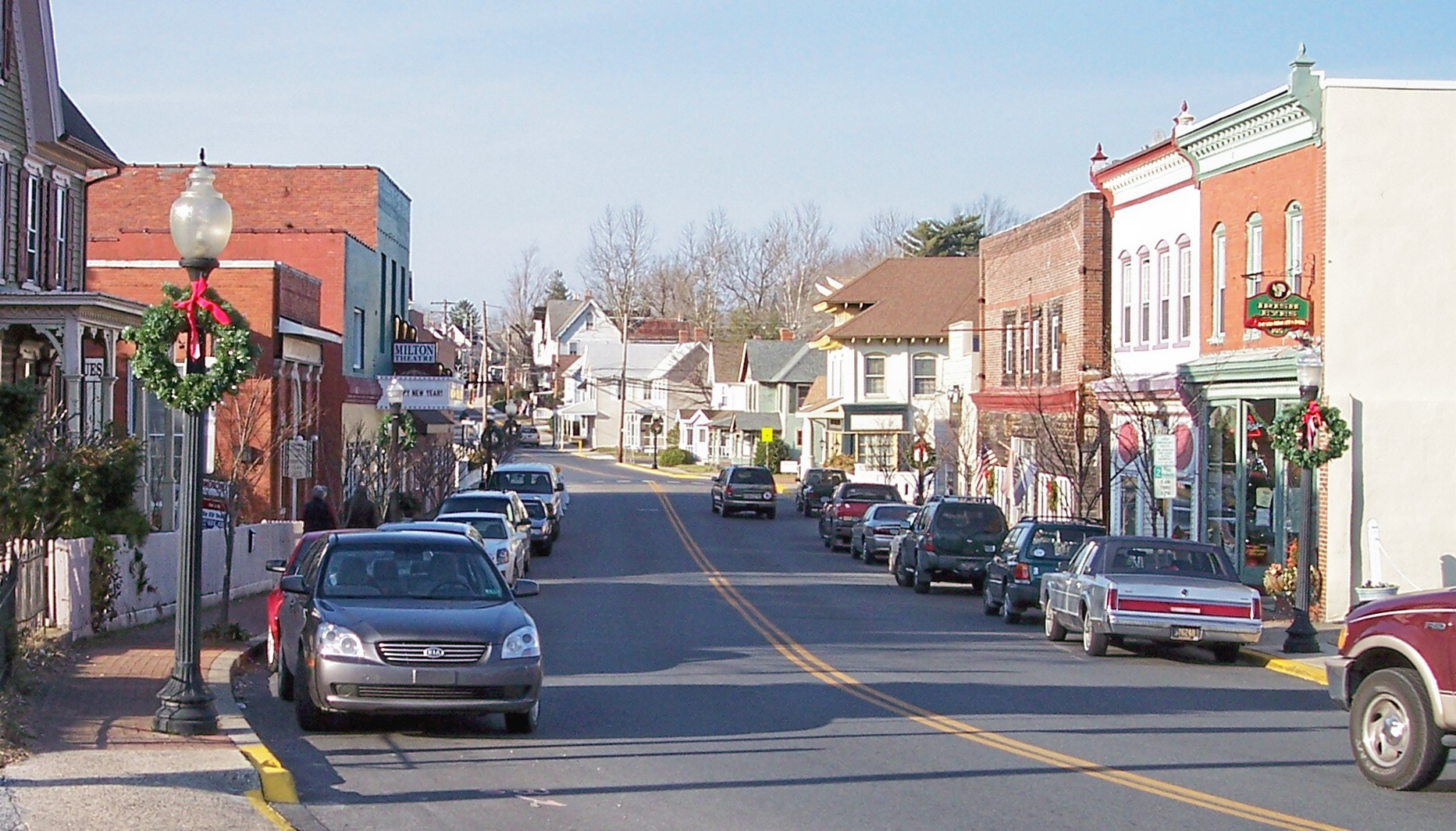
Milton

- Lewes (Principal city)
- Rehoboth Beach

=== Towns ===
- Dewey Beach
- Henlopen Acres
- Milton

=== Unincorporated places ===
- Angola
- Belltown
- Broadkill Beach
- Cool Spring
- Five Points
- Hollymount
- Hollyville
- Jimtown
- Midway
- Nassau
- Pinetown
- Quakertown

== Demographics ==
Because the Cape Region is not a precisely defined political area, there is no demographic data for the region specifically. At the 2010 Census, the approximate total population of the Cape Region was 41,584 which is an increase of 10,998 (35%) from 30,856 in the 2000 Census. The Cape Region tends to be more affluent than western parts of Sussex County.

== Politics ==
The majority of the area generally identified as the Cape Region is located in Delaware's 6th Senate district, with the sparsely populated southwestern communities of Hollyville and Hollymount located in Delaware's 19th Senate district. The region is split among five districts in the Delaware House of Representatives, those being the 4th, 14th, 27th, 36th, and 37th House of Representatives districts. Due to growth in the area outpacing growth in the rest of the state, the 4th House of Representatives district was moved in the 2021 redistricting from the Wilmington area to the Cape Region. On the local level, the City of Lewes has a Mayor and City Council; Rehoboth Beach, Dewey Beach, and Henlopen Acres have a Mayor and Board of Commissioners; and Milton has a Mayor and Town Council.

== See also ==
- Cape Henlopen
- Cape Henlopen State Park
- Cape Henlopen School District
- Delaware Seashore State Park
- Delaware Beaches
- Cape May–Lewes Ferry
