= Matthew Wilson (patriot) =

American patriot, pastor (1731–1790)

- Born: January 15, 1731; Chester County, Pennsylvania, British America
- Died: March 30, 1790 (aged 59); Lewes, Delaware, U.S.
- Occupation: Patriot · pastor · surgeon · educator · intelligence agent

Matthew Wilson (January 15, 1731 – March 30, 1790) was an American patriot, pastor, surgeon, educator, and intelligence agent. A Presbyterian minister based in Lewes, Delaware, he was an ardent supporter of American independence and served in the Continental Army as a surgeon and intelligence agent. Wilson was also a founder of the Medical Society of Delaware and has been recognized as one of Delaware's most prominent citizens during the colonial period.

== Biography ==
Wilson was the son of James and Jean Wilson, immigrants from northern Ireland. He was born in Chester County, Pennsylvania, on January 15, 1731. (Note: Some sources list his date of birth as 1729 or 1730. Sources conflict on whether he was born in East Nottingham Township or New London.) He received his education at the academy in New London, Pennsylvania, run by leading minister Francis Alison, which was a predecessor to the University of Delaware. Wilson studied multiple fields and was "one of the best-educated men in the American colonies", becoming both a licensed preacher and physician. When he was 23 years old, he was named a languages teacher at the New London Academy.

Wilson was ordained as a minister in 1755 and also became a physician and surgeon, having decided to study medicine under Alexander McDowell in Philadelphia as he thought the income he would have received solely from preaching was insufficient. After briefly beginning his career as a preacher in Virginia, he became the pastor of the Presbyterian Church in Lewes, Delaware, in April 1755, a town where he lived until his death. Wilson remained the pastor of the Lewes church continuously for over three decades, from his appointment until the time of his death. He was also the pastor of the Cool Spring Church and Indian River Congregation. Wilson became a preeminent Presbyterian in the state and served on many committees of the governing Synod, at one time being a contributor to a new constitution for the Presbyterian Church in the United States. Edward Neill, in the Pennsylvania Magazine of History and Biography, described that, "As a theologian, Dr. Wilson was discriminating. He believed that there was a Divine revelation in the Sacred Scriptures, and also that the Scriptures, by fallible men, were liable to misinterpretation. His faith was calm and reasonable, and therefore he did not sympathize with the emotional type of religion."

In contrast with the belief of many in the area, Wilson firmly considered it necessary for all Christians to have an interest in politics. He was incensed when the British government passed the Stamp Act 1765 taxing many items in the colonies and responded by helping to start a local boycott of taxed products. Amidst the growing conflict between the colonists and the British government, Wilson made clear his strong anti-British sentiment despite Sussex County having a large number of loyalists. Some people locally criticized his engagement in politics; Wilson defiantly responded by writing the word "Liberty" on his cocked hat, which "he proudly wore around town", and naming his newborn son James Patriot Wilson. Michael Morgan described how in southern Delaware, "The Loyalists were a constant threat to anyone who supported the American cause, but Matthew Wilson was not deterred. The fearless preacher, doctor and patriot walked the streets of Lewes, sometimes accompanied by his young son, James Patriot Wilson, wearing his hat stitched with the proud word, 'Liberty'".

After the passage of the Tea Act, Wilson banned his family from drinking tea and was vocal in his opposition to it. He authored an article which was published in newspapers and the American Magazine, edited by Thomas Paine, against the drinking of tea and proposing 17 herbs and vegetables which could be used to make substitute drinks. His preaching in Lewes led its citizens to prevent a group of ships with tea from advancing to their intended destination of Philadelphia, and they seized the tea. When, in 1774, the news reached Lewes that the British government had closed the port of Boston as a result of the Boston Tea Party, Wilson was one of the members of a committee to send help to the distressed inhabitants of the city. When the American Revolutionary War began soon after, he viewed it as "a holy war against the domination of royalty across the sea". Wilson served in the Continental Army as a surgeon and was also a special intelligence agent. As an agent, he provided the Continental Congress with information about British activities in his county and ships that sailed by the Delaware Cape. Wilson was also used in counterintelligence to expose loyalist spies.

Following the Revolutionary War, Wilson remained a pastor and continued his medical practice. During his life, he was considered one of the foremost doctors in Delaware, known for his extensive knowledge of diseases and as the leading medical writer from the state. He established and operated the Lewes Academy, teaching many medical students from across the eastern U.S., including as far south as South Carolina. In addition to teaching medicine, Wilson also served as a theology teacher during his lifetime. He authored a medical textbook called Therapeutic Alphabet and several of his students went on to be distinguished doctors, including Archibald Alexander and James McCallmont. Wilson was known as an "avid reader and note-taker" who "read with a pen in his hand so that he could fill the margins of his books with extensive notes". He wrote many journal articles on both medical and political topics. Wilson was published in The American Museum, the American Magazine, Transactions of the American Philosophical Society, the United States Magazine and The Pennsylvania Journal. Shortly before his death, he helped establish the Medical Society of Delaware and was named one of the organization's "censors", a position of oversight.

Wilson was known as a man of high character. He once won a container of aniseed at auction and discovered inside a bottle of much more valuable oil of rhodium. In response, he returned the item to the auctioneer and said it should be sold again at the correct value. "But the auctioneer, stunned by such honesty, insisted that all sales were final. Dr. Wilson sold the drug in Philadelphia for 10 times what he had paid for it," according to W. Emerson Wilson. Wilson was often requested to witness the signing of documents and once served as executor of an estate. He was awarded a Doctor of Divinity by the University of Pennsylvania in 1786.

Wilson married Hestor Gray in 1756, having two children with her before her death in 1762. He then remarried Elizabeth Craghead, with whom he had five children. Among his children were James Patriot Wilson, who became a prominent theologian, and Theodore Wilson, a doctor. His grandson, James Patriot Wilson Jr., served as President of the University of Delaware. Wilson died on March 30, 1790, in Lewes, and was buried at the Lewes Presbyterian cemetery. He is recognized as having been one of the most "outstanding colonial citizens" of Delaware. Neill noted Wilson to be, "Indulgent to the negroes to whom he was master, quick to aid the poor and distressed, affable in the presence of the young, courteous among his equals, acquainted with the world's progress in the arts and sciences, and a humble disciple of Christ".
