= Sussex Consortium =

School in Delaware, United States

Coordinates: 38°44′46″N 75°14′06″W

Sussex Consortium is a public K-12 school in an unincorporated area in Sussex County, Delaware, with a Lewes postal address, and a part of the Cape Henlopen School District.

It serves students, aged 3 to 21, with autism throughout all of Sussex County.

In addition to special needs students attending the Sussex Consortium school building, the institution also serves special needs students attending standard Cape Henlopen comprehensive schools.

== History ==
The school was established in 1983 and was housed in various facilities. In 2013 it moved into the former Lewes School in Lewes. As of 2018 it was the school with the highest increase of students. The Consortium was previously located in the former Lewes School in Lewes.

In 2015 the State of Delaware gave a certificate of necessity that allowed Cape Henlopen school district to establish a new building. The State of Delaware funded 100% of the construction of the current facility. In 2016 the State of Delaware planned to acquire 26 acres (11 ha) of land, with $1.8 million, and then create a 28-classroom 67,000-square-foot (6,200 m^{2}) facility worth $22 million. In 2017 all four members of the Sussex County Council voted to allow Sussex Consortium to get a new building. In 2018 the state of Delaware paid $13 million to add additional space: an indoor pool, a second gymnasium, and 18 classrooms. The construction timetable was changed after, in August of that year, the state awarded the additional funds. The classrooms include a vocational area and another pre-Kindergarten wing. The total price was around $44 million. Its opening was scheduled for March 16, 2020. However an unexpected school closure scheduled until May 15 meant that the district could finish additional work. Its new opening day was September 16, 2020.

== Campus ==
The total size of the school is 111,000 square feet (10,300 m^{2}). This was the first building of Sussex Consortium specially built for its purpose. Students are separated by age with the second floor having older students.

The school has blue lights lit at night so the district can publicize its autism awareness campaign. Water-related decorations were added as other area schools had such decorations. Groundbreaking occurred on May 14, 2018. Ellen Driscoll of The Cape Gazette wrote "Like all recent school designs that incorporate Cape Region elements, the student drop-off overhang resembles the Indian River Inlet bridge."

The classrooms have individual temperature controls due to some students being sensitive to heat, as well as in-suite bathrooms. Two-way glass is a feature for transparency reasons.

== Operation ==
The State of Delaware funds the school as it serves all areas of Sussex County.

As of 2019 the school has about the same number of employees at Sussex Consortium that it has at Cape Henlopen High School. The employee-to-student ratio at Sussex Consortium, which had about 300 students, is much higher.

== Transportation ==
As of 2019 the school has 27 buses. Because it has students from all of Sussex County, it has more buses than most elementary and middle schools in the Cape Henlopen school district.

== Student body ==
As of 2021 the school has about 200 students. About 70% of the students reside in the Cape Henlopen School District and 30% reside elsewhere in Sussex County.
