= Wolfe's Neck Site =

Archaeological site in Delaware, United States

- U.S. National Register of Historic Places
- Nearest city: Lewes, Delaware
- Area: 132 acres (53 ha)
- NRHP reference No.: 78000921
- Added to NRHP: November 21, 1978

Wolfe's Neck Site is an archaeological site located near Lewes, Sussex County, Delaware. The early occupation of the site was apparently a small seasonal camp. The later occupation may have been a more permanent village. Excavations conducted by the Section of Archaeology, Division of Historic & Cultural Affairs, in 1975 at one of the hillside middens produced a dated sequence of ceramics from 500 B.C. to 330 A.D.

It was added to the National Register of Historic Places in 1978.
