= Cape Henlopen School District =

School district in Sussex County, Delaware, USA

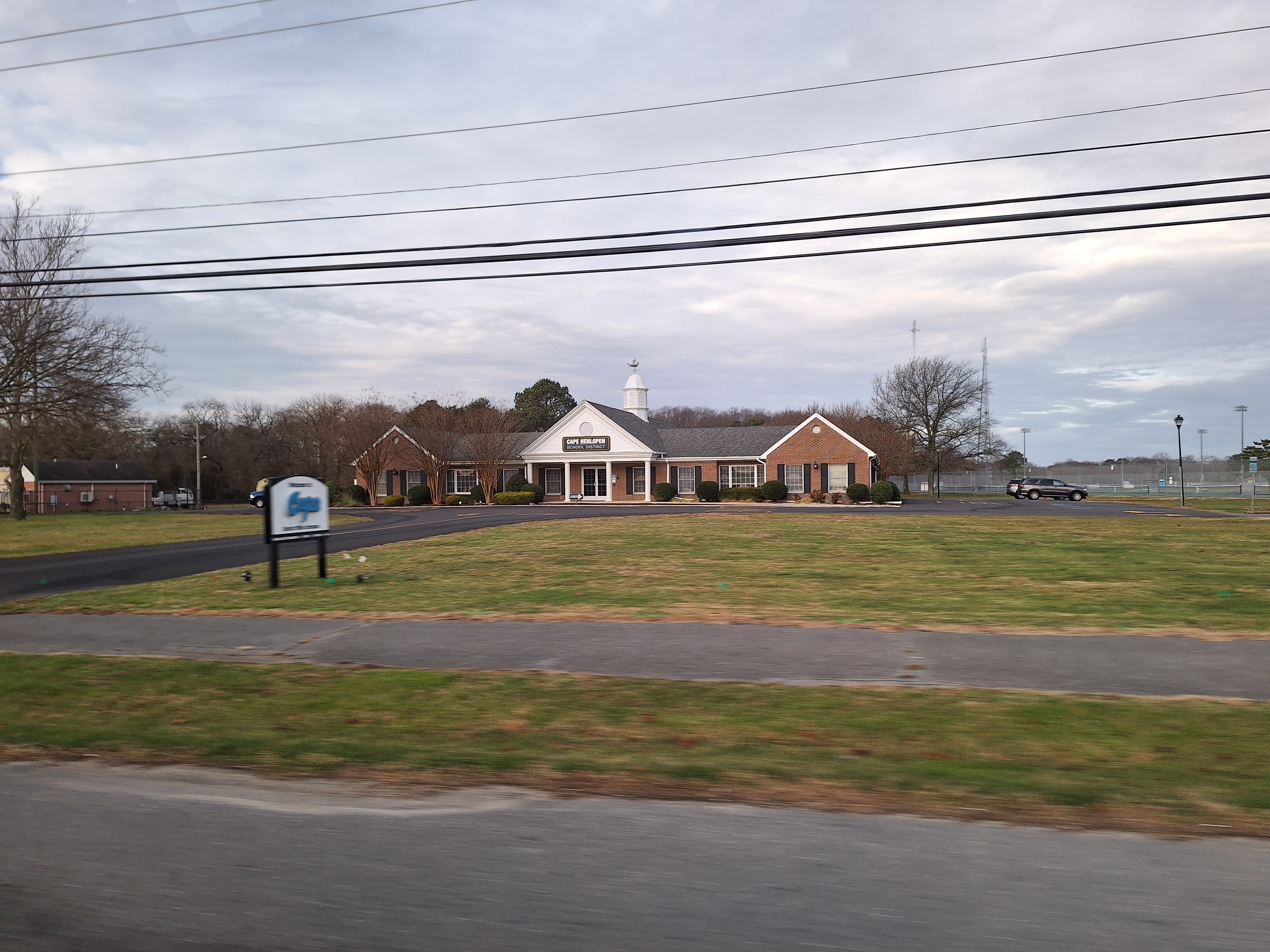
- School District headquarters

Location
- 1270 Kings Highway, Lewes DE 19958 Cape Region in Sussex County, Delaware United States

District information
- Type: Public
- Grades: K−12
- Established: 1969
- Superintendent: Robert Fulton
- Budget: $80,035,787.00

Students and staff
- Students: 5,256
- Teachers: 414
- Staff: 989
- Athletic conference: Henlopen North Conference
- District mascot: Viking
- Colors: Blue and gold

Other information
- Website: Official Site

The Cape Henlopen School District (CHSD) is a public school district in Sussex County, Delaware in the United States. The district is based in an unincorporated area with a Lewes postal address, and serves the Cape Region in eastern Sussex County.

Cape Henlopen School District was established in 1969. Communities served by the district include Lewes, Henlopen Acres, Rehoboth Beach, Dewey Beach, and Milton.

== History ==
It was created in 1969 by the merger of the Lewes, Milton, and Rehoboth school districts.

In March 2016, voters approved of a bond referendum to build new schools, with 74% of voters, numbering 2,947, choosing yes.

== Schools ==
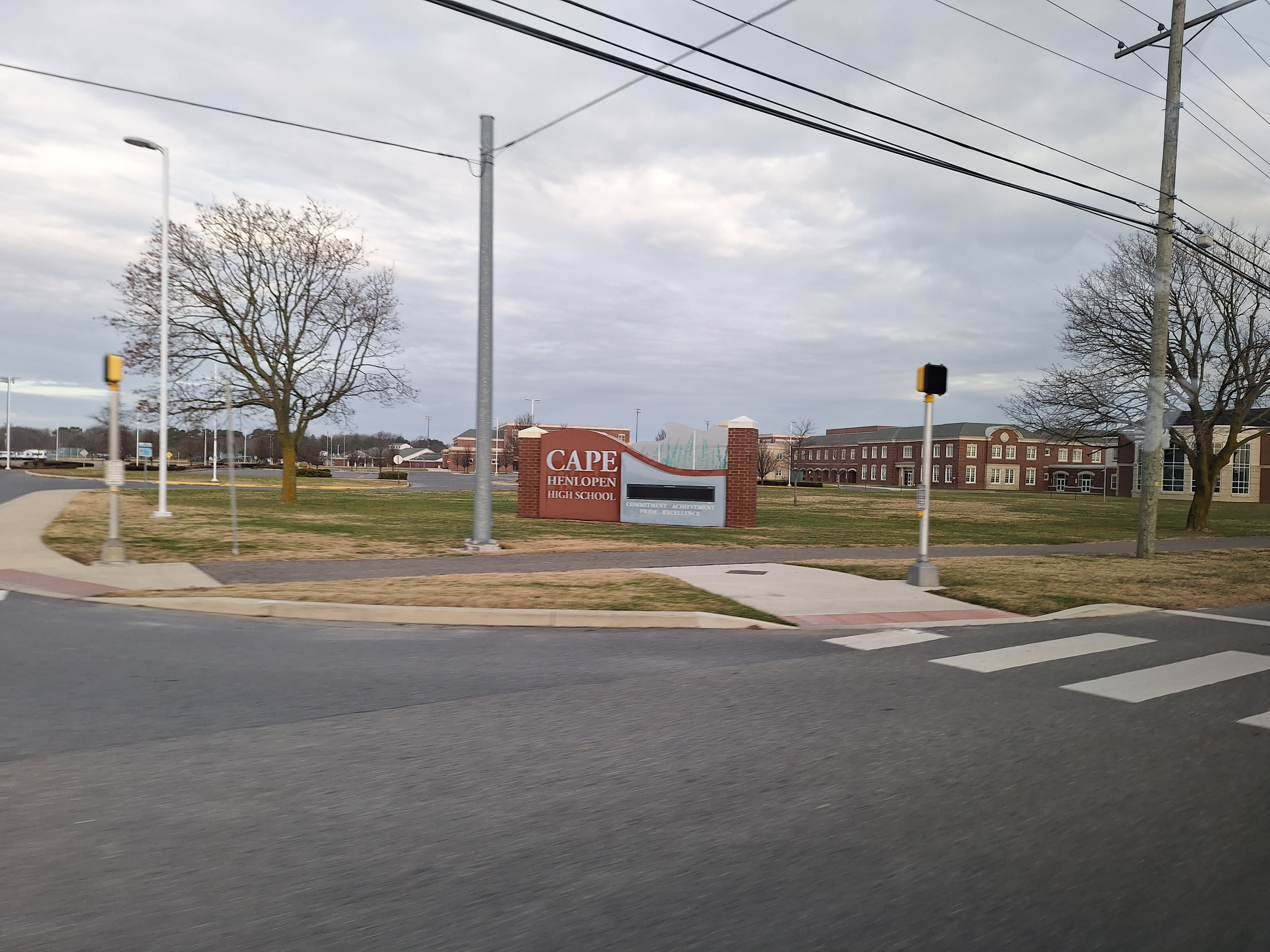
Cape Henlopen High School

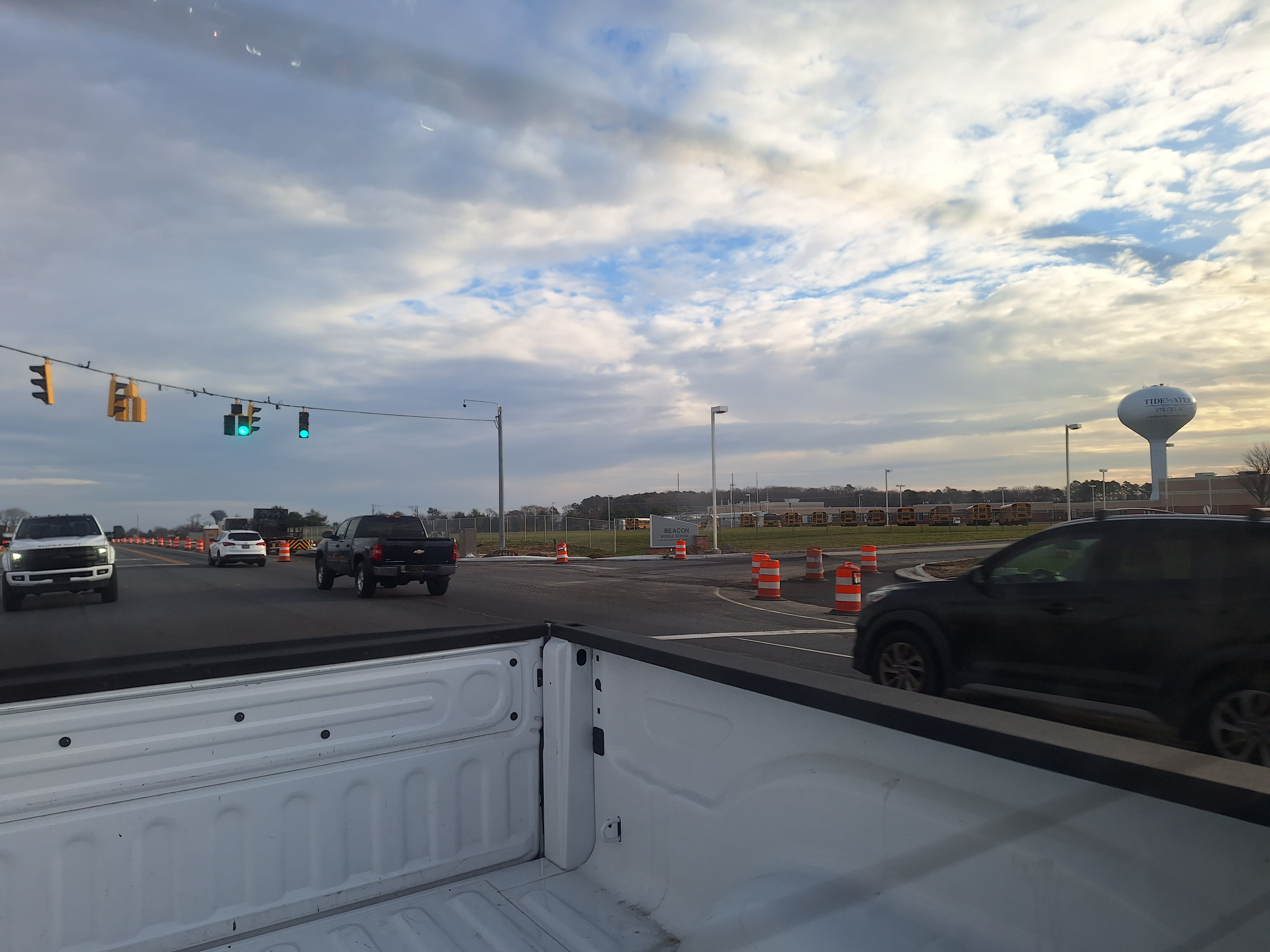
Beacon Middle School

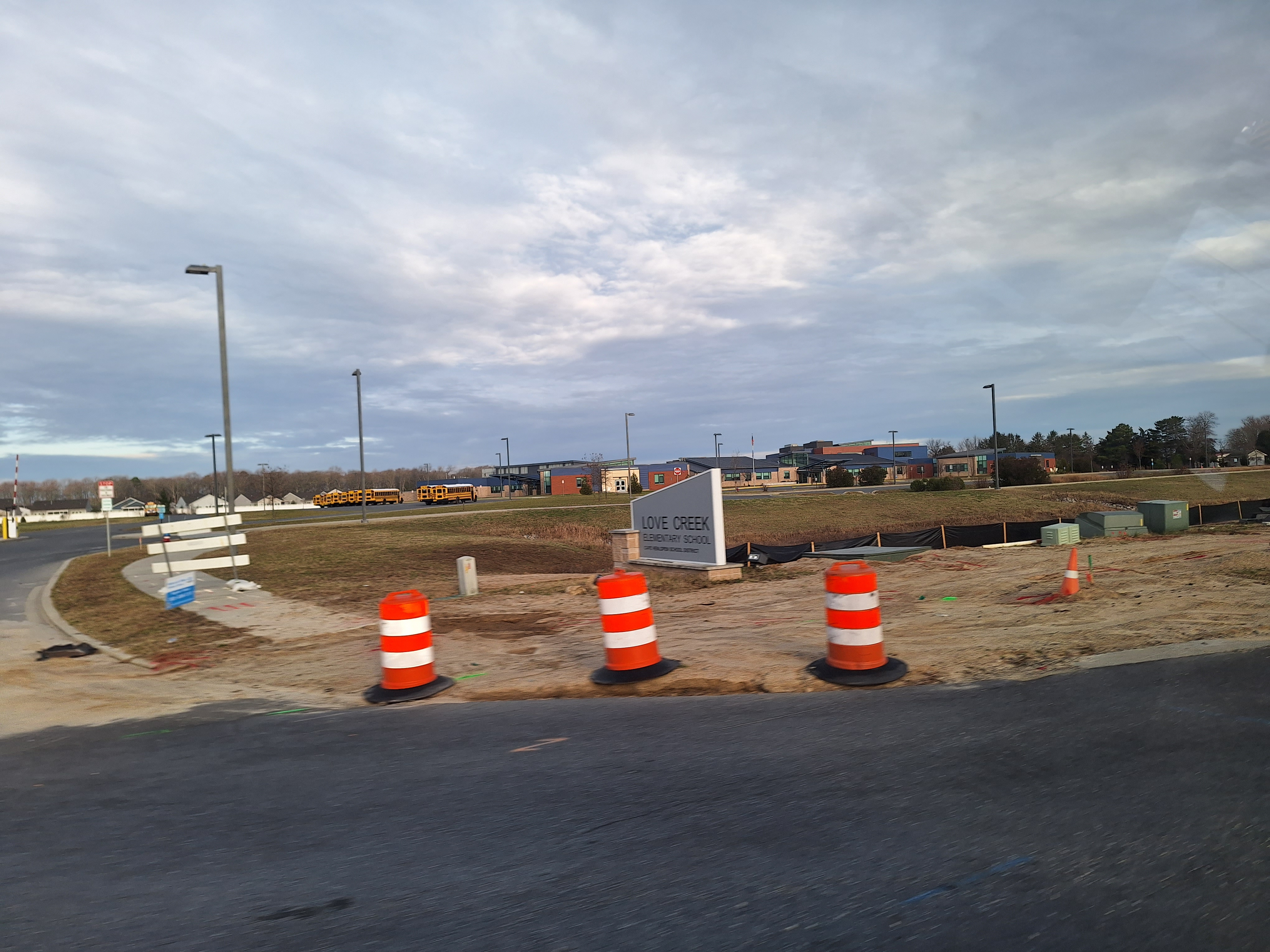
Love Creek Elementary School

High school

- Cape Henlopen High School

Middle schools

- Beacon Middle School
- Mariner Middle School
- Frederick D. Thomas Middle School (opened fall 2024)

Elementary schools

- Brittingham (H.O.) Elementary School
  - The original school was built in 1966. The current school was built on the grounds of the previous facility, with groundbreaking in 2017. The roof has a learning area. Compared to the original building, there is more space for kindergarten and first grade classrooms.
- Love Creek Elementary School
  - On the other side of Beacon Middle School, it has two sections. It has a two-story grade 2-5 wing with grades 2-3 and 4-5 on their respective upper and lower floors; each grade has six classrooms. There is a separate kindergarten wing and a separate first grade wing; the kindergarten classrooms have in-suite bathrooms. The rooms are arranged in hub formats. Love Creek Elementary is on a 25 acres (10 ha) plot of land, and was to be 90,000 square feet (8,400 m^{2}) of space. The price tag was about $29 million. It was to absorb about 100-200 students from each of the existing schools.
  - It opened in 2017. Of the schools that opened in its bond cohort, it was the only new school.
- Milton Elementary School
- Rehoboth Elementary School
  - It is on a 25-acre (10 ha) plot of land. The current building was to open in 2019. It has 92,000 square feet (8,500 m^{2}) of space. In the same location as the former building, uses the same design as Brittingham and Love Creek schools. It had a cost of $33 million. It has features that refer to the local area.
- Shields (Richard A.) Elementary School
  - The original Shields Elementary opened in 1966. In 1987, 1994, and 2007 the building was either given an addition or it was renovated. The school had about 800 students until 2017, when the student body declined to 550, as Love Creek Elementary opened and took some of the students. The district planned to demolish the current Shields facility in 2022, so it could build a new middle school on the site, and Shields Elementary will be moved to the first Lewes School building. The gymnasium was preserved while the Little Vikings section, a 1921 addition at Lewes School, was demolished. The district plans to build new two story additions at the Lewes School building. The new school will have a capacity of about 650 students.

Alternative

- Sussex Consortium (Lewes)

Former schools

- Ninth Grade Campus
- Lewes Middle School
- Milton Middle School

== Notable alumni ==
- Bryan Stevenson, lawyer, activist, author, law professor; founder and executive director of Equal Justice Initiative based in Montgomery, Alabama.
- John Morris – MLB pitcher, born in Lewes
- Jimmie Allen American country singer

== See also ==
- List of school districts in Delaware
