= Fisher's Paradise =

Historic house in Delaware, United States

- U.S. National Register of Historic Places
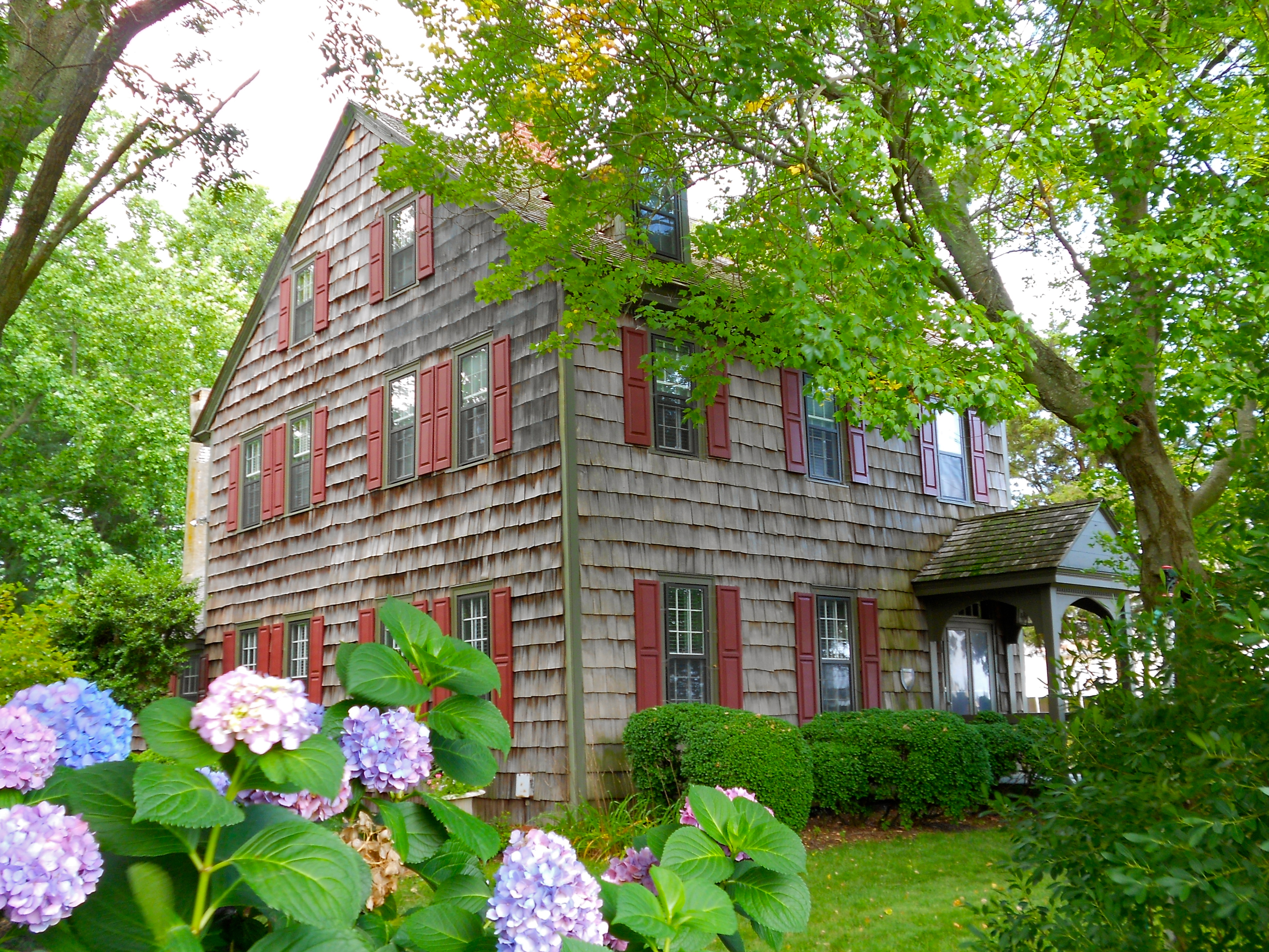
- Fisher's Paradise, July 2012

- Location within Delaware Location within the United States
- Location: 624 Pilottown Rd., Lewes, Delaware
- Coordinates: 38°47′1″N 75°9′26″W
- Area: less than one acre
- Built: c. 1780
- Architectural style: Victorian
- NRHP reference No.: 72000298
- Added to NRHP: December 4, 1972

Fisher's Paradise, also known as Paradise Point , is a historic home located near Lewes, Sussex County, Delaware. The main house dates to about 1780, and is a 2 1/2-story, three-bay, wood frame dwelling sheathed in cedar shingles. It has gable roof with dormers. The kitchen wing is the sole remaining portion of the original 1740s house that is incorporated in the present structure.

It was added to the National Register of Historic Places in 1972.
