= Fenwick =

Fenwick may refer to:

== Places ==
=== Canada ===
- Fenwick, Nova Scotia, a community
- Fenwick, Ontario, a village

=== United Kingdom ===
- Fenwick, East Ayrshire, a village
- Fenwick, Kyloe, Northumberland
- Fenwick, Matfen, the location of Fenwick Tower, Northumberland
- Fenwick, South Yorkshire, a village and civil parish

=== United States ===
- Fenwick, Connecticut, a borough
- Fenwick, Michigan, an unincorporated community
- Fenwick Settlement, Missouri, an abandoned village
- Fenwick, West Virginia, a census-designated place
- Fenwick Island (Delaware–Maryland), a barrier spit in the Atlantic Ocean
- Fenwick Creek, a tributary of the Salem River in southwestern New Jersey

== People ==
- Fenwick (surname)
- Fenwick (given name)

== Other uses ==
- Fenwick baronets
- Fenwick Fishing Rods, a brand of Pure Fishing
- Fenwick (department store), a chain of independent department stores in the United Kingdom
- Fenwick Groupe, a French engineering company
- Fenwick High School (disambiguation)
- Fenwick Hall, Johns Island, South Carolina, a house on the US National Register of Historic Places
- Fenwick Pier, Hong Kong
- Fenwick Tower (Halifax), Nova Scotia, Canada
- Fenwick Tower (Northumberland), England
- Fenwick tree, a type of data structure
- Fenwick (statistic), a statistic used in ice hockey, also known as unblocked shot attempts

== See also ==
- Fenwick & West, a law firm based in Silicon Valley
- Grand Fenwick, a fictional country in Leonard Wibberley's comic novels and two related films
- Bishop Fenwick High School (disambiguation)
