= Delaware Bicycle Route 1 =

Bicycle route in Delaware, United States

- Length: 150 mi (240 km)
- South end: Maryland border in Fenwick Island
- North end: BicyclePA Route L at Pennsylvania border near Montchanin

Delaware Bicycle Route 1 (Bike Route 1) is a bicycle route that runs the north-south length of the U.S. state of Delaware, from the Maryland border in Fenwick Island, Sussex County north to the Pennsylvania border near Montchanin, New Castle County. The route passes through many Delaware scenes, including beaches, farmland, state parks, and towns. The route is the first of many signed bike routes planned in the state.

== Route description ==
=== Sussex County ===
Bike Route 1 begins at the Maryland border in the beach town of Fenwick Island. The route heads north on Delaware Route 1, the Coastal Highway. It passes through the town and then proceeds north, passing through Fenwick Island State Park, one of three Delaware state parks located on the Atlantic Ocean. The bike route then passes through the residential South Bethany and the more commercial Bethany Beach. These resorts, along with Fenwick Island, make up "The Quiet Resorts" of Delaware.

From Bethany Beach, the bike route continues north on Delaware Route 1, passing through the Sussex Shores area before entering Delaware Seashore State Park, a state park located on an isthmus with the Atlantic Ocean to the east and the Rehoboth Bay and the Indian River Bay to the west. The state park stretches between Sussex Shores to the south and Dewey Beach to the north. Within the park, the bike route crosses the Indian River Inlet on the Indian River Inlet Bridge.

Bike Route 1 then proceeds into Dewey Beach, a beach that is well known as a party town. The route continues north on Delaware Route 1, skirting the popular beach resort of Rehoboth Beach to the west. The route passes by the Tanger Outlets Rehoboth Beach outlet mall and other commercial sprawl located on DE 1 outside of Rehoboth Beach.

In Midway, the bike route separates from Delaware Route 1 by heading south on Old Landing Road and west on Warrington Road. At the intersection of Delaware Route 24, the bike route continues straight on Plantation Road (Delaware Route 1D), passing through housing developments that have sprouted throughout the coastal areas of Delaware. The bike route follows Plantation Road to the Five Points intersection where it turns south on Delaware Route 23. The bike route follows DE 23 to the intersection with Dairy Farm Road, where it turns to the northwest to intersect with U.S. Route 9.

Bike Route 1 continues north of US 9 on Sweetbriar Road to Cave Neck Road, where it veers to the northwest on Cave Neck Road. The bike route enters a more rural, agricultural setting as it heads toward the historical shipbuilding town of Milton. Once the bike route reaches Milton, it heads north through the town on Union Street (Delaware Route 5). North of Milton, the route proceeds north on Cedar Creek Road.

The bike route follows Cedar Creek Road through the farmland of northeastern Sussex County, eventually merging with Delaware Route 30. The bike route follows DE 30 to Johnson Road, which it turns west on, passing through the community of Lincoln. The route follows Fitzgeralds Road west upon crossing U.S. Route 113. It then winds to the northwest on Rust Road and Union Church Road before reaching Abbotts Pond Road. It follows Abbotts Pond Road to the west, passing by the Abbotts Pond Nature Preserve.

=== Kent County ===
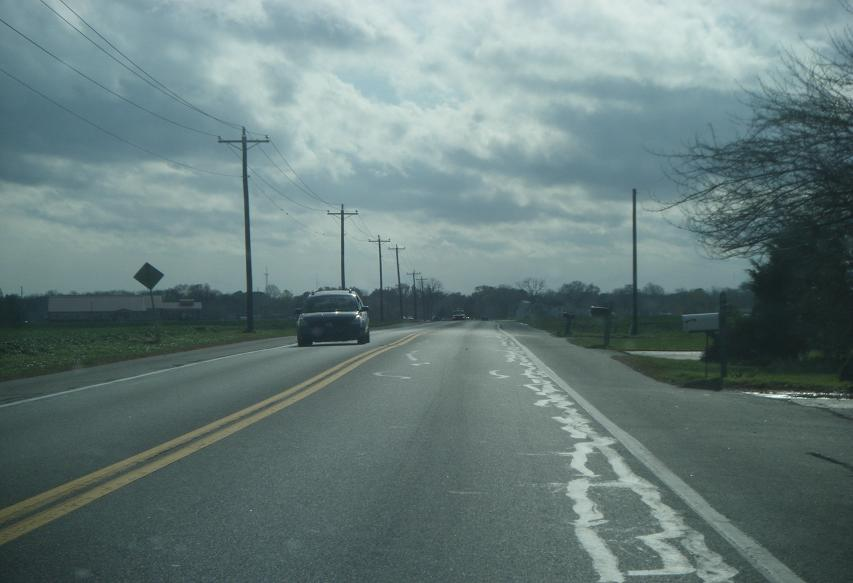
Bike Route 1 along DE 15 (Wyoming Mill Road) north of Wyoming

Bike Route 1 then crosses a branch of the Mispillion River into Kent County, where it heads to the community of Williamsville. In Williamsville, the bike route turns to the north onto Deep Grass Lane. The route passes through the town of Houston and then crosses Delaware Route 14, where it heads north on Killens Pond Road.

The bike route follows Killens Pond Road north toward Killens Pond State Park and then angles west, running along the north boundary of the park. This segment of the route features a bike path separate from the roadway, paralleling it to the south. The bike route follows this path to the intersection with U.S. Route 13. It then heads west on Reeves Crossing Road before turning north on Little Mastens Corner Road.

The route follows Little Mastens Corner Road to the town of Felton, where it follows Main Street (Delaware Route 12) east for a brief distance before turning north on Church Street, which becomes Turkey Point Road. It heads north on Turkey Point Road, paralleling a Delmarva Central Railroad line, and passes through Viola before reaching the town of Woodside. In Woodside, the route follows Main Street (Delaware Route 10 Alternate/Delaware Route 15) west to Dundee Road (Delaware Route 15) north.

Bike Route 1 follows Delaware Route 15 north through countryside before reaching the town of Wyoming, passing through the core of the town on Railroad Avenue West. The route remains with DE 15 north of Wyoming, following Wyoming Mill Road, which features designated shoulders for bicycles. The bike route meets the western outskirts of the Delaware state capital, Dover. It proceeds east on Hazlettville Road before heading north on Saulsbury Road (Delaware Route 15), which changes names to McKee Road at the intersection with Walker Road.

It follows McKee Road north out of Dover and into the town of Cheswold. The route then heads to the north out of Cheswold on Moorton Road. The route loops to the west before turning north on Brenford Road and then veering to the northwest on Hillyard Road. Bike Route 1 then heads north on Wheatleys Pond Road (Delaware Route 300) toward the town of Clayton. In Clayton, the bike route heads west on School Lane and briefly west on Main Street (Delaware Route 6) before heading to the north on West Duck Creek Road (Delaware Route 15).

=== New Castle County ===
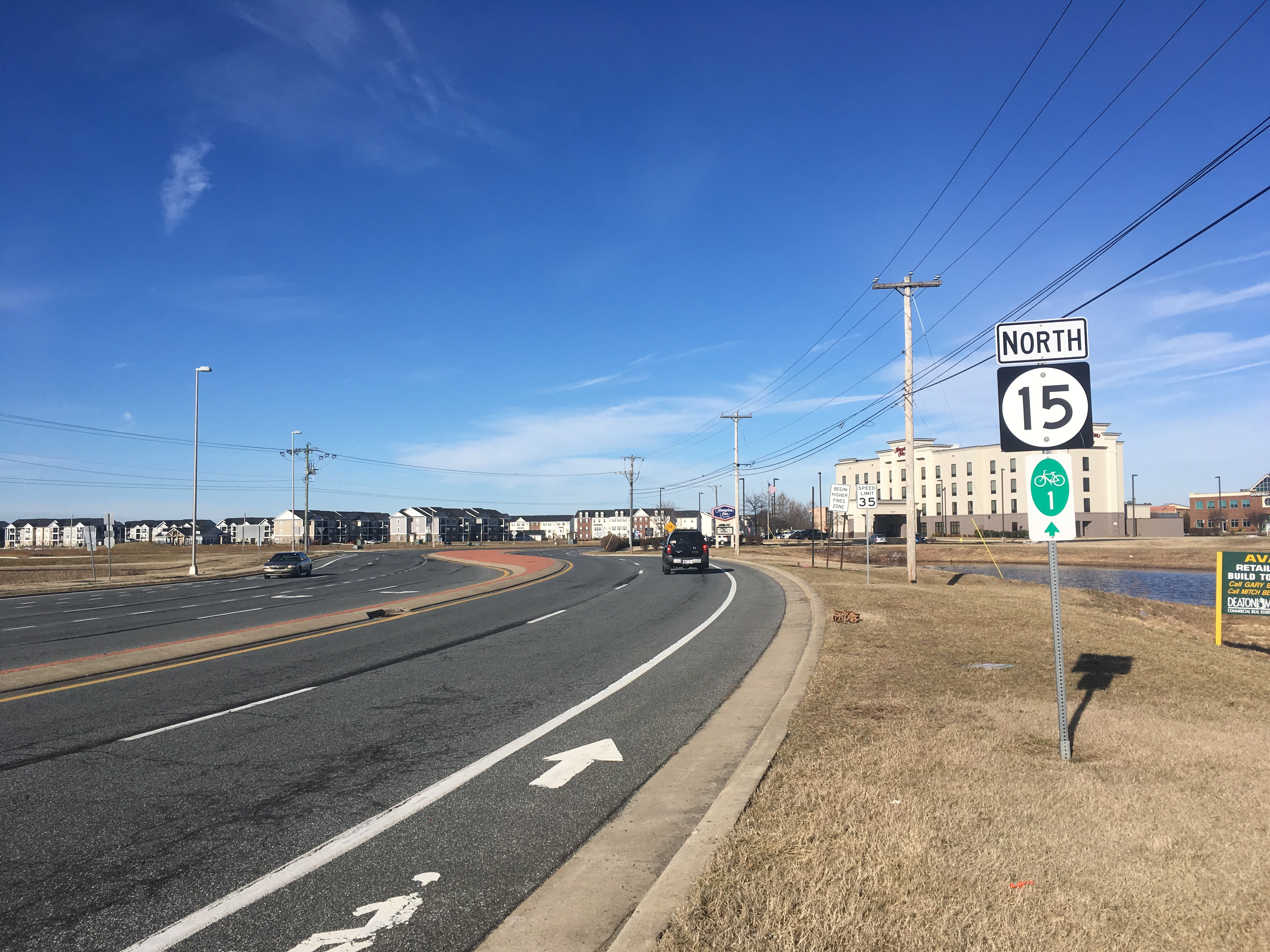
Bike Route 1 along DE 15 (Bunker Hill Road) in Middletown

The route enters New Castle County, heading north on Clayton Greenspring Road. It crosses a Delmarva Central Railroad line before resuming north on Blackbird Greenspring Road and it enters the Blackbird State Forest. It heads toward the community of Blackbird, passing to the east of Blackbird Pond, and heads to the west on Blackbird Station Road.

Bike Route 1 follows Blackbird Station Road west before heading northwest on Grears Corner Road and then to the northeast on Dexter Corner Road. The route then reaches the town of Townsend, passing through the town on Commerce Street and Railroad Avenue. It then heads to the northwest on Wiggins Mill Road, passing by Wiggins Mill Pond. The route then runs east on St. Annes Church Road to Delaware Route 71.

It then heads north on Delaware Route 71 into Middletown, running along South Broad Street. In the center of town, the route heads west on West Main Street (Delaware Route 299). At the intersection with Middletown Warwick Road, Bike Route 1 swings to the north on Bunker Hill Road (Delaware Route 15). It follows the DE 15 routing north to Summit Bridge, where the bike route crosses the Chesapeake & Delaware Canal on the Summit Bridge.

North of the Summit Bridge, the bike route follows Delaware Route 896 north to Howell School Road. It then turns east on Howell School Road, running along the northern boundary of Lums Pond State Park. The bike route then heads north on Woods Road and then east on Porter Road, entering a more suburban setting.

The bike route follows Porter Road east to Delaware Route 72, where Porter Road veers to the north, passing a railroad junction. It then crosses U.S. Route 40 where the bike route resumes to the north on Salem Church Road. Salem Church Road carries Bike Route 1 north across Interstate 95. It then turns east on Chapman Road for a brief distance before passing through the Sherwood Forest neighborhood on East Regal Boulevard and South Brownleaf Road. It then crosses Delaware Route 273 and proceeds through the Hillside Heights neighborhood on North Brownleaf Road. The bike route then heads north on South Harmony Road.

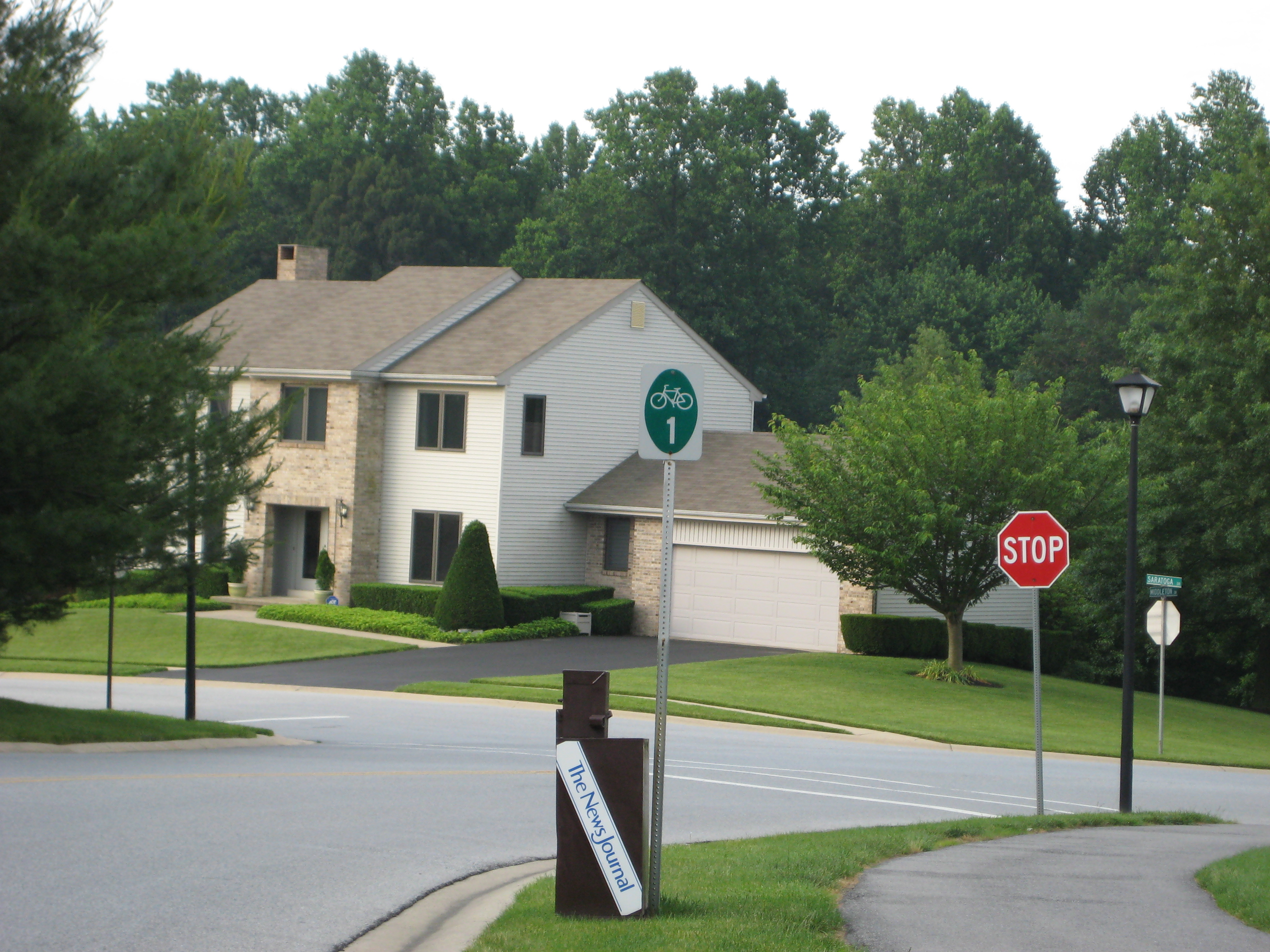
Bike Route 1 marker on the residential Middleton Drive in Mendenhall Village

Bike Route 1 follows Harmony Road across Delaware Route 4, where it also crosses the East Coast Greenway, and Amtrak's Northeast Corridor. It then heads west on Ruthar Drive, passing through an industrial park. The route heads north on Red Mill Road, which becomes Polly Drummond Hill Road at the intersection with the Capitol Trail (Delaware Route 2). The bike route then follows New Linden Hill to the northeast toward the Pike Creek area. It then turns to the north onto Skyline Drive and then crosses Delaware Route 7, proceeding to the northeast on Stoney Batter Road.

The bike route then winds north through residential neighborhoods on Middleton Drive and Village Drive. It then turns east on Mendenhall Mill Road before heading north on Mill Creek Road. It follows Mill Creek Road north, paralleling the Mill Creek, to Hockessin. The bike route heads off to the northeast of Hockessin on Yorklyn Road to the community of Yorklyn. In Yorklyn, the bike route turns south on Delaware Route 82, paralleling the Red Clay Creek and the Wilmington and Western Railroad tourist line and then heading east across the Hoopes Reservoir.

At the intersection with Delaware Route 52, the bike route continues to the east on Kirk Road. It then turns north on Delaware Route 100, passing by the Winterthur Museum, Garden and Library (the former home of Henry Francis du Pont) and the Brandywine Creek State Park. Bike Route 1 follows DE 100 north to the Pennsylvania border. At the Pennsylvania border, it connects with BicyclePA Route L, which heads north through the state of Pennsylvania.
