= Fenwick Island =

Fenwick Island may refer to:

- Fenwick Island (Delaware–Maryland), an Atlantic Ocean barrier island
- Fenwick Island, Delaware, a town
- Fenwick Island Light, a lighthouse at the Delaware-Maryland border
- Fenwick Island State Park, a park in Delaware
