= Fenwick Island State Park =

State park in Delaware, United States

Fenwick Island State Parks
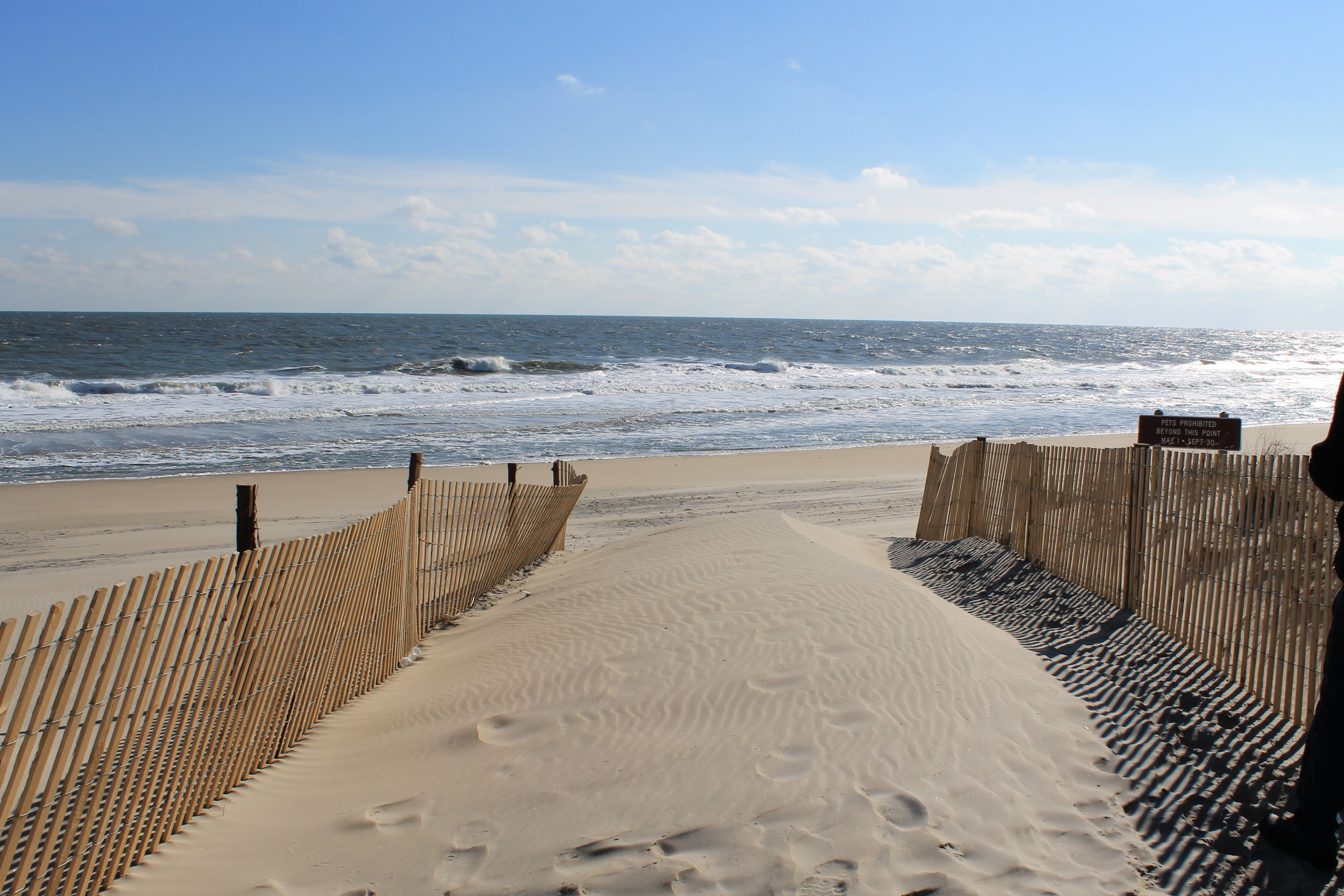

- Location within Delaware Location within the United States
- Location: Sussex County, Delaware, United States
- Coordinates: 38°28′33″N 75°03′16″W
- Area: 375.47 acres (151.95 ha)
- Established: 1966
- Administrator: Delaware Department of Natural Resources and Environmental Control
- Website: Official website

Fenwick Island State Park is a 375-acre (152 ha) Delaware state park between Ocean City, Maryland and South Bethany, Delaware in Sussex County, Delaware, United States. Originally part of Delaware Seashore State Park, it was established in 1966 and renamed in 1981. The park is located on Fenwick Island, a narrow strip of land between the Atlantic Ocean and Little Assawoman Bay. It is largely undeveloped in comparison to the beach communities that surround it.

== History ==
Fenwick Island is named for Thomas Fenwick, a planter who migrated to the Thirteen Colonies from York, England. He was granted rights to the land by Lord Baltimore, the second Proprietary Governor of the Province of Maryland, in 1682. Fenwick never actually lived on Fenwick Island, but he did rise to a position of importance in Sussex County government. He served as a Justice of the Peace, Sheriff and register of wills until his death in 1708. Some legends contend that Fenwick swam ashore at Fenwick Island after being thrown overboard by pirates. Most historians do not believe that this happened. It is, however, likely that Fenwick's future son-in-law did swim ashore. William Fassett swam ashore after being cast off by a group of pirates. He would go on to marry Fenwick's daughter, Mary and claim the land of Fenwick Island for himself.

Colonial ownership of Fenwick Island was disputed between the family of William Penn, governor of the Province of Pennsylvania and Delaware Colony and the family of Cecil Calvert governor of the Province of Maryland. The dispute was settled in the 1750s when the Trans-Peninsular Line was drawn. This line which forms the southern boundary of Delaware begins on Fenwick Island at the Fenwick Island Lighthouse.

While the governors of Delaware and Maryland were arguing over the correct boundaries, pirates used the harbors of Little Assawoman Bay to the west of Fenwick Island State Park as a safe haven. For 100 years the pirates raided the ships of local and passing sea capitans, using Cedar Island in the bay as their base of operations.

Fenwick Island has remained largely undeveloped because it is a narrow peninsula that is just 3 miles (4.8 km) wide. The constantly shifting dunes have made commercial and residential development difficult. The town of Fenwick Island is located just above the Delaware/Maryland border. Despite several descriptions of Fenwick Island as a barrier island, it is clear from maps that it is not a true island. The border between Maryland and Delaware below Fenwick Island is a land boundary. Ocean City, Maryland occupies the southern tip of the peninsula on which Fenwick Island is situated.

Ownership of the land was designated to the state of Delaware in 1926. It was used as part of the coastal defense system during the World War II years. An observation tower from this era still stands at the northern end of the park. Management of the property was transferred from the Delaware Highway Department to the State Park Commission in 1966. Fenwick Island State Park was originally the southern portion of Delaware Seashore State Park. The parks were divided in 1981. Fenwick Island State Park is managed in conjunction with Holts Landing State Park on Indian River Bay to the north.

== Recreation ==
Fenwick Island State Park borders the Atlantic Ocean and Little Assawoman Bay. The beach at the ocean is open to swimming, surfing and surf fishing. The bay side of the park is open to fishing, recreational crabbing, clamming, sailing and windsurfing and kayaking.

Preceded by York Beach	Beaches of Delmarva	Succeeded by Fenwick Island
