= Fenwick Tower =

Fenwick Tower may refer to:

- Fenwick Tower (Halifax, Nova Scotia), Canada
- Fenwick Tower, Northumberland, Matfen, England
