= Batson Branch (Dirickson Creek tributary) =

Batson Branch Tributary to Dirickson Creek
- Location within Delaware Location within the United States

Location
- Country: United States
- State: Delaware
- County: Sussex

Physical characteristics
- Source: Agricultural Ditch divide
  - location: about 0.25 miles northeast of Roxana, Delaware
  - coordinates: 38°30′04″N 075°09′45″W
  - elevation: 21 ft (6.4 m)
- Mouth: Dirickson Creek
  - location: about 0.1 miles north of Johnson, Delaware
  - coordinates: 38°28′50″N 075°08′08″W
  - elevation: 0 ft (0 m)
- Length: 2.09 mi (3.36 km)
- Basin size: 2.17 square miles (5.6 km^{2})
- Discharge
  - average: 2.55 cu ft/s (0.072 m^{3}/s) at mouth with Dirickson Creek

Basin features
- Progression: southeast
- River system: Little Assawoman Bay
- Tributaries
  - left: unnamed tributaries
  - right: unnamed tributaries
- Bridges: Wilgus Cemetery Road; Evans Road; Bayard Road

Batson Branch is a 2.09 mi (3.36 km) long 2nd order tributary to Dirickson Creek, in Sussex County, Delaware.

== Variant names ==
According to the Geographic Names Information System, it has also been known historically as:

- Roxana Branch

== Course ==
Batson Branch rises on the Agricultural Ditch divide about 0.25 miles northeast of Roxana in Sussex County, Delaware. Batson Branch then flows southeast to meet Dirickson Creek about 0.1 miles north of Johnson, Delaware.

== Watershed ==
Batson Branch drains 2.17 square miles (5.6 km^{2}) of area, receives about 44.7 in/year of precipitation, has a topographic wetness index of 630.22 and is about 8.2% forested.

== See also ==
- List of rivers of Delaware
