= Holts Landing State Park =

State park in Delaware, United States

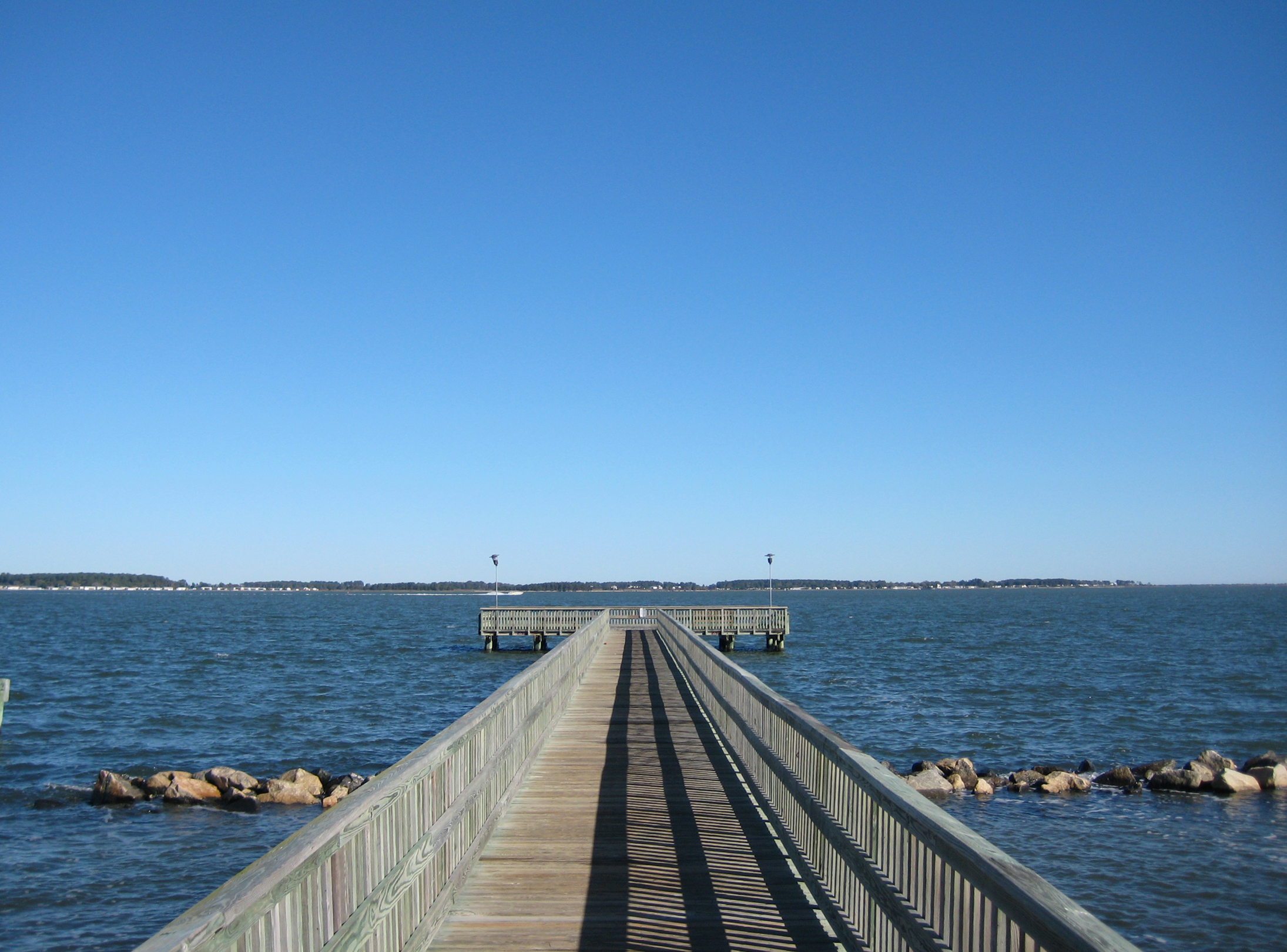
- Crabbing pier at Holts Landing State Park

- Location within Delaware Location within the United States
- Location: Sussex County, Delaware, United States
- Coordinates: 38°35′35″N 75°08′03″W
- Area: 205.60 acres (83.20 ha)
- Elevation: 0 feet (0 m)
- Established: 1965
- Administrator: Delaware Department of Natural Resources and Environmental Control
- Named for: The Holt family
- Website: Official website

Holts Landing State Park is a 205-acre (83 ha) public recreation area on the southern shore of Indian River Bay, five miles (8.0 km) northwest of Bethany Beach, Sussex County, Delaware, United States. The park features a pier purpose-built for crabbing, the recreational harvesting of blue crabs, and boat ramp that is open 24 hours a day.

== History ==
Prior to becoming a state park the land of Holts Landing State Park was the Holt family farm. The Holts sold the land to the state of Delaware in 1957 and Holts Landing State Park was opened to the public in 1965.

Holts Landing State Park, on Indian River Bay, has long been a center of crabbing, fishing, hunting, and farming dating back to the Pre-Columbian history of what is now southeastern Delaware. Native peoples took advantage of the abundant seafood that was harvested in the shallow waters of the inland bays. They also hunted wildlife in the surrounding marshes and forests.

The arrival of colonists from Europe signalled the end of the way of life that the Native Americans had known. They were driven out by war and disease and were displaced by people of European ancestry who began farming the land on the southern coast of Indian River Bay. These colonists continued the practice of harvesting seafood from the bay and expanded their farming operations slowly over the years. The Holt family operated a small family farm and boat landing for many years before selling their property to the state in 1957. Holts Landing State Park was opened for public use in 1965.

By 2014, Holts Landing State Park had begun to show signs of neglect. An estimated 6,000 people visited the park that year and, thanks to a Delaware Division of Parks and Recreation funding formula that allocated funding for maintenance and improvements based on annual visitor totals, the park had received little funding over the previous 10 to 12 years due to its limited number of annual visitors. A negative cycle had begun in which fewer and fewer visitors came to the park as its facilities deteriorated, resulting in fewer and fewer funds with which to correct deficiencies there. To address the situation, local residents formed a volunteer organization, the Friends of Holts Landing State Park, in October 2014 to sponsor clean-up and maintenance activities at the park and to partner with Delaware Parks and Recreation officials in maintaining the park's grounds and facilities and constructing improvements at the park. Between January and May 2015, the Friends of Holts Landing State Park cleaned up the park's trails, installed new trail signs and markers, worked with the Delaware Department of Natural Resources and Environmental Control to reconfigure trails to avoid anticipated problems with a rise in sea level expected over the next 20 years, and installed new benches and picnic tables. In the summer of 2015, the park celebrated its 50th anniversary and its recent improvements with its first summer music concert series, held as part of a summer series of monthly "Family Fun Nights" that began that year.

In October 2015, the park's old single-lane boat ramp closed. It was removed and replaced with an updated, two-lane concrete ramp leading to a newly dredged channel. The new ramp opened in April 2016.

== Recreation ==
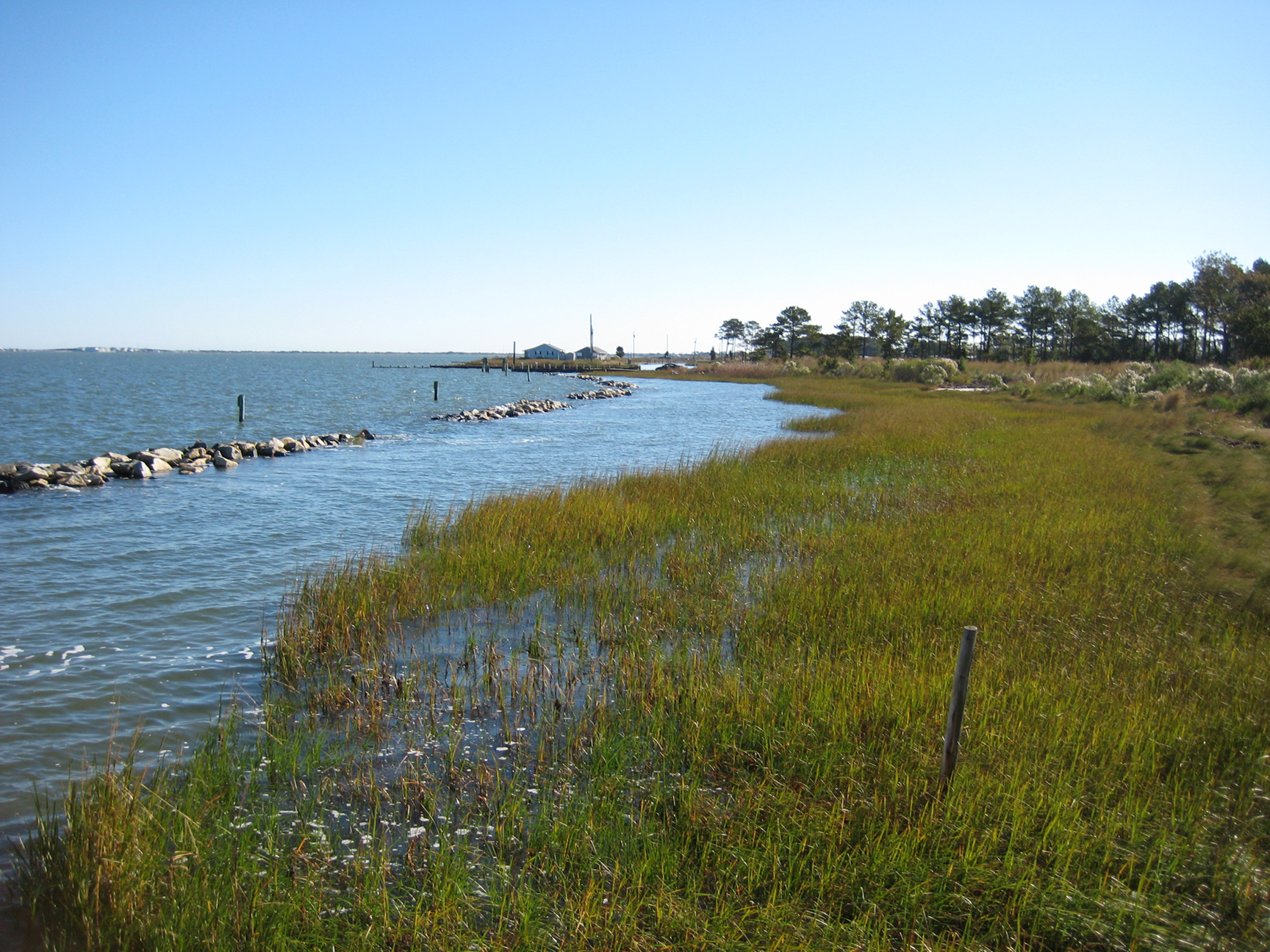
Shoreline of Indian River Bay at Holts Landing State Park

Holts Landing State Park has 2,000 feet (610 meters) of shoreline along the south coast of the Indian River Bay. The park's 220-foot (67-meter) crabbing pier on the bay was constructed in 2001 to provide visitors with easy access to the abundant blue crabs of the park; crabbers lower a baited basket into the waters of the bay and wait for the crabs to take the bait before pulling them out of the water. The pier also is open for fishing; the common game fish in the bay are sea trout, flounder, bluefish, and perch. Visitors may also wade into the shallow waters of the bay to harvest clams.

The park's two-lane concrete boat ramp provides the only public boat and kayak access on the south shore of the Indian River Bay between Millsboro to the west and the Indian River Inlet to the east; the launching facilities lead to a channel 60 feet (18 meters) wide by 4 feet (1.2 meters) deep, and the ramp can accommodate boats up to 25 feet (7.6 meters) in length. The ramp has its own parking area and is popular with fishermen and recreational boaters.

The park encompasses 204 acres (83 hectares) of upland forest, within which are several hidden fresh water ponds which have evolved naturally from borrow pits left behind by the Delaware Department of Transportation after road construction. The park has three 20-acre (8-hectare) wilderness campsites, all located within the forest, and two main trails – the Sea Hawk Trail and the Seahorse Trail – and three lesser trails with a combined length of 3.1 miles (5.0 km) and open for easy hiking, biking, and equestrian use:

- The Sea Hawk Trail, accessible from the park's main parking area and from the Seahorse Trail, is laid out as a 1.3-mile (2.1-km) three-quarter loop that affords bird and wildlife viewing opportunities in the park's various coastal bay environments, passing through mixed hardwood and conifer forest, alongside a number of the fresh water ponds, and through a grassy meadow that is home to many types of birds, including ospreys, before terminating near the Indian River Bay shoreline.
- The Seahorse Trail is a 1.8-mile (2.9-km) loop accessible from the Sea Hawk Trail or via the Connector Trail. Built on packed earth, the Seahorse Trail provides access to the western portion of the park, passing the campsites and running along the forest's edge, along the edge of the large meadow, and through dense forest areas that include some of the fresh water ponds.
- The Connector Trail is a short trail along the southern boundary of the park that leads from Holts Landing Road to the Seahorse Trail, following the edge of the forest.
- An unnamed trail runs through the forest south of the campsites. It allows visitors to shorten the Seahorse Trail loop by skipping the southern portion of the Seahorse Trail.
- A remnant of a portion of the Sea Hawk Trail that once ran along the Indian River Bay shoreline still exists, although it no longer connects to the Sea Hawk Trail. This remnant runs for about 200 feet (61 meters) from a grassy area between the main parking area and the crabbing pier eastward to the Indian River Bay shoreline.

Holts Landing State Park's picnic facilities include picnic tables located in shady sections of the park. There are nearby charcoal grills and a large lawn for the spreading of picnic blankets. A pavilion with a large grill and a seating capacity of 80 people is available to rent for events such as family reunions, church gatherings, and company picnics. Holts Landing State Park also features a playground and horseshoes pits. Public toilet facilities are located between the main parking area and the crabbing pier.

The Assawoman Canal, which connects Indian River Bay to the north with Little Assawoman Bay to the south, is part of Holts Landing State Park. Immigrant laborers initially dug the canal by hand in the 1890s. Last dredged in the 1950s, the canal is no longer deep enough to handle the boat traffic that once passed through it when it was part of the Intracoastal Waterway. Although a privately owned marina lies within the park at the northern end of the canal, most of the rest of the canal is too shallow and narrow for recreational motorboats to navigate safely. The canal has become a haven for recreational kayakers.

== Wildlife ==
Holts Landing State Park is home to a wide variety of wildlife. Commonly seen wading birds include herons, egrets and ibises. Hawks and ospreys are the most often seen birds of prey at the park. The forests are populated with songbirds, white-tailed deer, raccoons, foxes, muskrats, and opossums. The small ponds that evolved when the abandoned road construction pits filled with fresh water have created habitats for local animals and plants. The Assawoman Canal also provides a habitat for a wide variety of wildlife. Possible development along the canal has drawn the attention of the Sierra Club.
