= Fenwick (given name) =

Fenwick is a masculine given name which may refer to:

People

- Fenwick W. English (born 1939), American educational leader, author, professor, editor and auditor
- Fenwick Lionel Kelly (1863–1944), Canadian politician
- Fenwick Lansdowne (1937–2008), Canadian wildlife painter
- Fenwick Lawson (born 1932), English sculptor
- Fenwick Skrimshire (1774–1855), English physician and naturalist
- Fenwick Smith (1949– l2017), American flutist
- R. Fenwick Taylor (1849–1926), American lawyer and politician
- Michael Fenwick Briggs (1926–2017), British businessman

Fictional characters

- Fenwick (Ninjago), a character in Ninjago
- Fenwick Travers, antihero of novels by Raymond M. Saunders
- Fenwick Babbitt, character portrayed by American comic Jackie Gleason
