= Assawoman Canal =

Canal in Delaware, United States

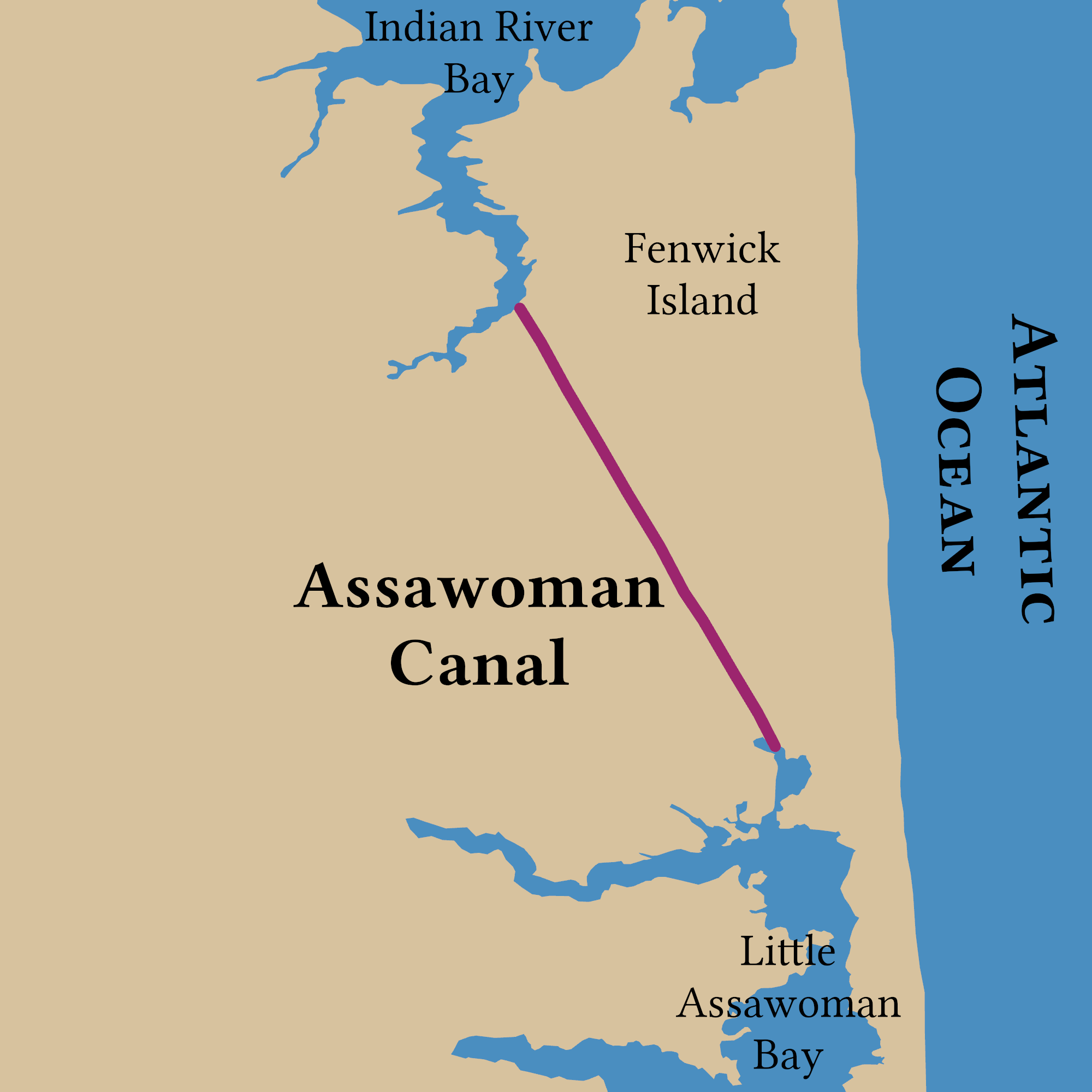
- The path of the Assawoman Canal
- Location: Sussex County, Delaware
- Country: United States
- Coordinates: 38.5353°N 75.0765°W

Specifications
- Length: 4 miles (6.4 km)
- Locks: None
- Status: Open

History
- Date completed: 1891

Geography
- Start point: Indian River Bay
- End point: Little Assawoman Bay
- Beginning coordinates: 38.5577°N 75.0896°W
- Ending coordinates: 38.5057°N 75.0647°W
- Branch of: Intracoastal Waterway

The Assawoman Canal is a canal in Sussex County, Delaware, United States. The canal links the Indian River Bay to the north with the Little Assawoman Bay to the south. It is bordered by Bethany Beach and South Bethany to the east and Ocean View to the west. Because of it, Fenwick Island is detached from the Delaware mainland.

First proposed in 1884, the Assawoman Canal was constructed by the U.S. Army Corps of Engineers in 1891 for the purpose of moving goods by boat without having to travel into the Atlantic Ocean. The canal was initially dug by hand in the 1890s by immigrant labor. The canal was not dredged from the 1950s until 2006. By the early 2000s, it was no longer deep enough to handle the boat traffic that once passed through it when it was part of the Intracoastal Waterway. From 2006 to 2010, the state undertook a dredging project that restored the canal to navigability, with a channel width of 35 feet (11 m) and a depth of 3 feet (0.91 m).
