= Bishop Fenwick High School =

The name Bishop Fenwick High School may mean:

- Bishop Fenwick High School (Peabody, Massachusetts)
- Bishop Fenwick High School (Franklin, Ohio)
- William V. Fisher Catholic High School, originally known as Fenwick High School, in Lancaster, Ohio

== See also ==
- Fenwick High School (disambiguation)
