= Fenwick Travers =

Fictional character created by Raymond M. Saunders

Fenwick "Fenny" Travers is a fictional character and antihero created by Raymond M. Saunders. The character was inspired by the character of Harry Flashman in a series of historical novels written by George MacDonald Fraser, but the character of Travers did not become as successful as his British counterpart.

== Overview ==
The character Fenwick Travers was envisaged by Saunders as the American equivalent of Harry Flashman, having been inspired by the novels written by Fraser during the 1970s onwards. Several Travers books were written during the 1990s, and despite some positive reviews from journalists, they failed to receive the fame of the Flashman novels.

== The Travers novels ==
Each book, like the Flashman novels, is set during a particular event in American history, and follows the actions of the antihero Travers during these events that lead to his becoming an iconic American hero. Below is the name of each book and the events that the book focuses on.

- Fenwick Travers and the Years of Empire: An Entertainment - The Boxer Rebellion in China (1995)
- Fenwick Travers and the Forbidden Kingdom: An Entertainment - Moro Rebellion in the Philippines (1995)
- Fenwick Travers and the Panama Canal: An Entertainment - Creation of the Panama Canal in 1903 (1996)

== Differences between Flashman and Travers ==
Although being inspired by the Flashman character, Travers differs from Flashman in several important aspects:

- The Flashman novels take place between the 1840s and late 1860s, whereas the Travers novels are set between the 1880s and the early 1900s
- Flashman is written to appear as though he was a real person, but Saunders acknowledges that Travers is a fictional character
- The Flashman novels were written in the style of a discovered set of memoirs, whereas the Travers stories are written as adventure novels.
- Harry Flashman was based on a character of the same name in an earlier book, Tom Brown's School Days, by Thomas Hughes. Travers is an original character, and is not based on any other character.
