= Fenwick Island, Delaware =

- Town
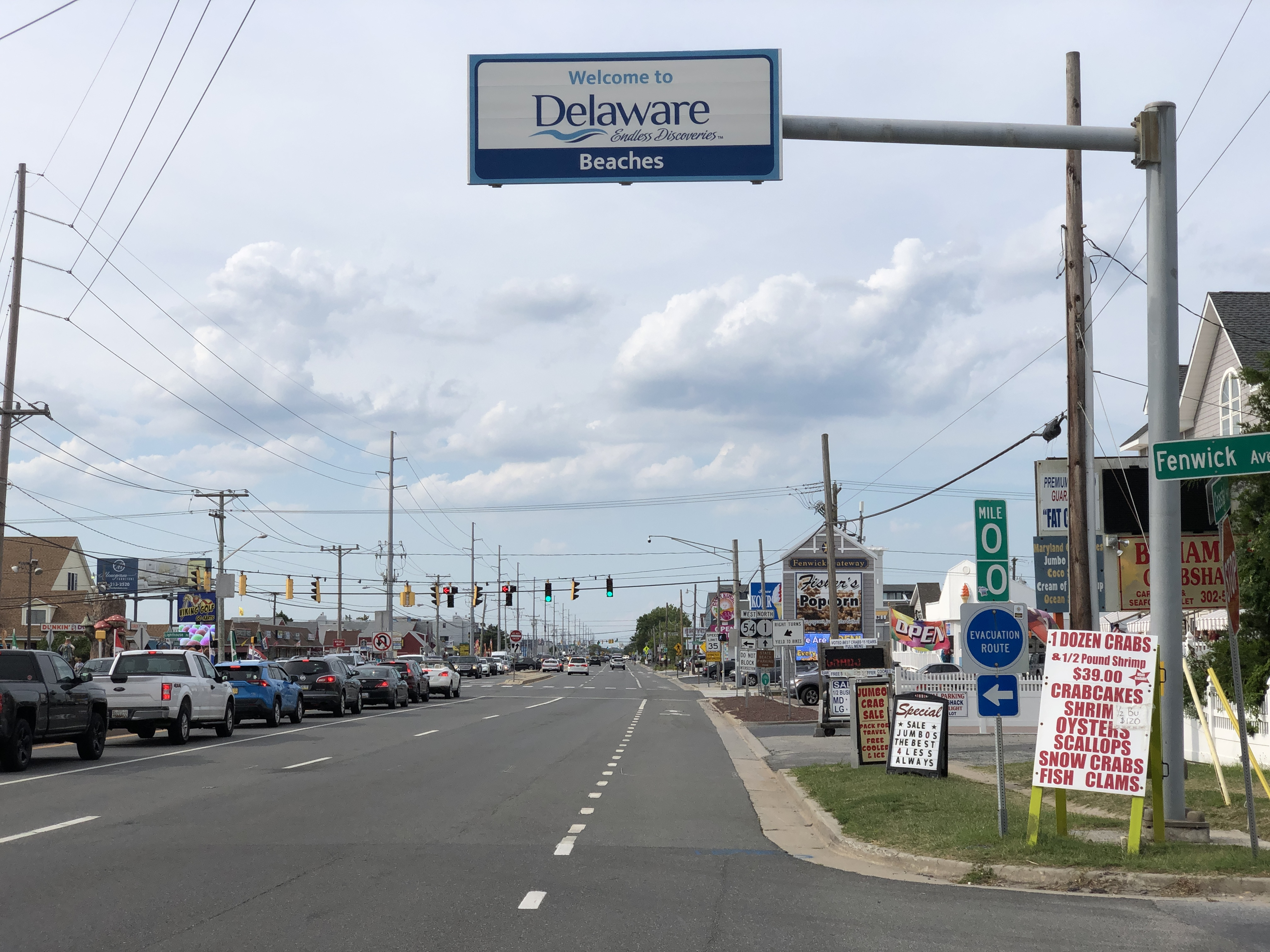
- Looking north towards downtown Fenwick Island on Delaware State Route 1 (Coastal Highway), 2022

- Flag Seal

- Location of Fenwick Island in Sussex County, Delaware

- Location within the state of Delaware Fenwick Island (the United States)
- Coordinates: 38°27′44″N 75°03′05″W
- Country: United States
- State: Delaware
- County: Sussex

Area
  - Total: 0.49 sq mi (1.26 km^{2})
  - Land: 0.33 sq mi (0.86 km^{2})
  - Water: 0.15 sq mi (0.40 km^{2})
- Elevation: 7 ft (2.1 m)

Population (2020)
  - Total: 343
  - Density: 1,035.2/sq mi (399.69/km^{2})
- Time zone: UTC−5 (Eastern (EST))
  - Summer (DST): UTC−4 (EDT)
- ZIP codes: 19944, 19975
- Area code: 302
- FIPS code: 10-26880
- GNIS feature ID: 213954
- Website: www.fenwickisland.delaware.gov

Fenwick Island is a coastal resort town in Sussex County, Delaware, United States. According to 2020 census figures, the population of the town is 355, a 2.6% decrease over the last decade. It is part of the Salisbury, Maryland–Delaware Metropolitan Statistical Area. The town is located on Fenwick Island, a barrier spit.

Fenwick Island and its neighbors to the north, Bethany Beach and South Bethany, are popularly known as "The Quiet Resorts." This is in contrast to the wild atmosphere of Dewey Beach and the cosmopolitan bustle of Rehoboth Beach. Fenwick Island, however, is somewhat less "quiet" than "the Bethanies" because it is immediately across the state line from Ocean City, Maryland, which has a reputation as a lively vacation resort.

== Geography ==
Contrary to popular belief, the town does not sit on a barrier island but on a barrier spit which resembles a barrier island, (unless one considers a narrow man-made boat canal well inland that connects White Creek to Little Assawoman Bay). The narrow strip of land separates the Atlantic Ocean from Little Assawoman Bay. Ocean City, Maryland, occupies the southern tip of this peninsula.. Fenwick Island used to be an island but has since naturally become a barrier spilt.

Fenwick Island is located at 38°27′44″N 75°03′05″W (38.4623346, –75.0512922).

According to the United States Census Bureau, the town has a total area of 0.5 square miles (1.3 km^{2}), of which 0.3 square miles (0.78 km^{2}) is land and 0.1 square miles (0.26 km^{2}) (28.57%) is water.

=== Climate ===
The climate in this area is characterized by hot, humid summers and generally mild to cool winters. According to the Köppen Climate Classification system, Fenwick Island has a humid subtropical climate, abbreviated Cfa on climate maps.

Climate data for Fenwick Island, Delaware
Month	Jan	Feb	Mar	Apr	May	Jun	Jul	Aug	Sep	Oct	Nov	Dec	Year
Record high °F (°C)	75 (24)	76 (24)	87 (31)	93 (34)	96 (36)	101 (38)	102 (39)	100 (38)	98 (37)	91 (33)	86 (30)	77 (25)	102 (39)
Mean daily maximum °F (°C)	44 (7)	46 (8)	54 (12)	64 (18)	73 (23)	82 (28)	87 (31)	85 (29)	79 (26)	68 (20)	58 (14)	48 (9)	66 (19)
Mean daily minimum °F (°C)	25 (−4)	27 (−3)	34 (1)	41 (5)	51 (11)	60 (16)	65 (18)	64 (18)	57 (14)	45 (7)	37 (3)	29 (−2)	45 (7)
Record low °F (°C)	−13 (−25)	−8 (−22)	3 (−16)	20 (−7)	28 (−2)	39 (4)	43 (6)	42 (6)	32 (0)	21 (−6)	15 (−9)	−7 (−22)	−13 (−25)
Average precipitation inches (mm)	3.94 (100)	3.30 (84)	4.57 (116)	3.44 (87)	3.91 (99)	3.32 (84)	3.47 (88)	5.59 (142)	3.99 (101)	3.36 (85)	3.26 (83)	3.32 (84)	45.47 (1,153)
Source: The Weather Channel

== Infrastructure ==
=== Transportation ===
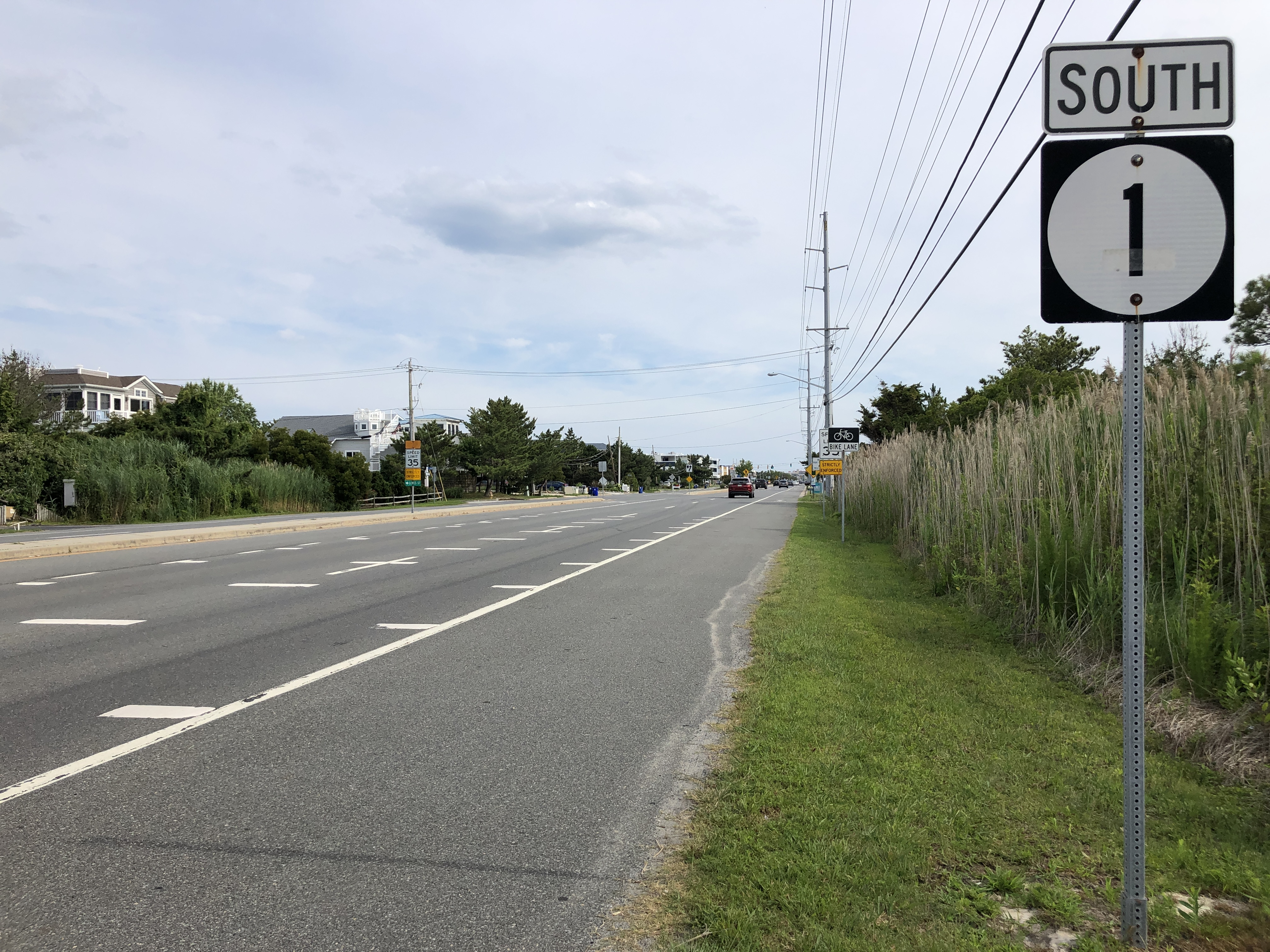
DE 1 southbound entering Fenwick Island

Delaware Route 1 (Coastal Highway), which has its southern terminus at the Maryland border in Fenwick Island, serves as the main north–south road in the town, heading north along the coast toward Bethany Beach and Rehoboth Beach. Coastal Highway crosses the Maryland border and heads south through Ocean City as Maryland Route 528. Delaware Route 54 (Lighthouse Road) begins at DE 1 in Fenwick Island a block north of the state line and heads west toward Selbyville to provide access from inland areas. Between May 15 and September 15, parking permits are required along all streets in Fenwick Island.

DART First State provides bus service to Fenwick Island in the summer months along Beach Bus Route 208, which heads north to the Rehoboth Beach Park and Ride and the Lewes Transit Center Park and Ride near Lewes to connect to other Beach Bus routes and the Route 305 bus from Wilmington and south to the 144th Street Transit Center in Ocean City, Maryland, a short distance south of the state line to connect to Ocean City Transportation's Coastal Highway Beach Bus.

=== Utilities ===
Delmarva Power, a subsidiary of Exelon, provides electricity to Fenwick Island. Chesapeake Utilities provides natural gas to the town. Artesian Water Company, a subsidiary of Artesian Resources, provides water to Fenwick Island. Sussex County operates the Fenwick Island Sanitary Sewer District, which provides sewer service to the town. Cable and internet service in Fenwick Island is provided by Xfinity. Trash and recycling collection in Fenwick Island is provided under contract by Waste Industries.

== Police and Fire department ==
Police department

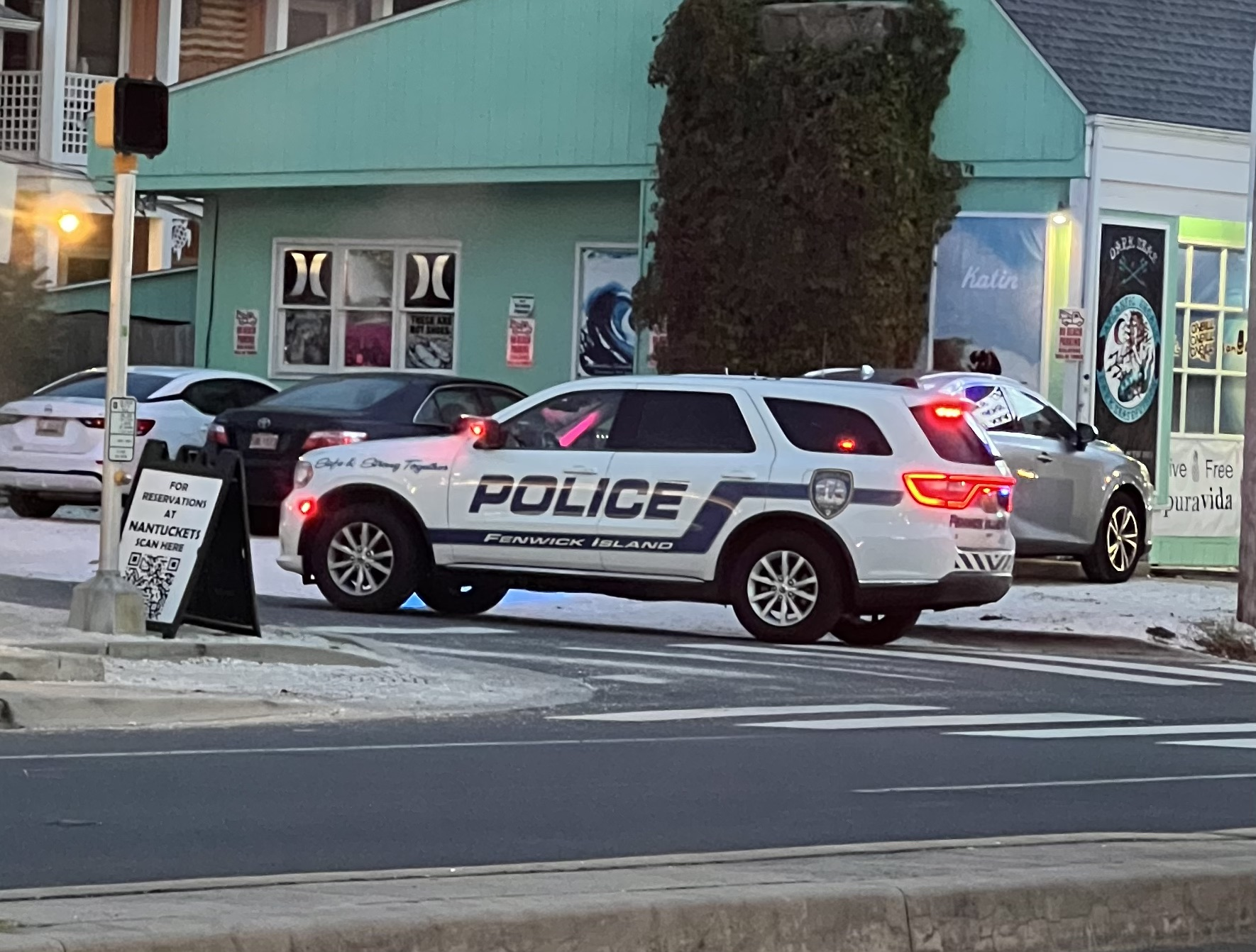
Fenwick Island Police Dodge Durango conducting a traffic stop in Fenwick Island during dusk. August 11, 2024

Fenwick Island Police Department is a small department with around six officers and a chief. It is unknown how many vehicles they operate, however based on a website photo they do operate at least one Humvee (HMMWV). The Fenwick Island Police Department building is located at the Fenwick Island Town Hall complex.

In 2020 former FIPD Chief William Boyden was sentenced to two years in prison and fined $200 by the State of Delaware for Official Misconduct and Falsifying Business Records related to his firearms training. He can no longer work in law enforcement.

In October of 2025 the department earned state accreditation. This is in line with Delaware House Bill 206 that requires all departments in the state to get accredited by 2028. The department started working towards accreditation during the summer of 2025.

As of 2017 officers are issued pistols chambered in .45 Automatic Colt Pistol (ACP) and some officers are equipped with 7.62 mm rifles, the department also runs at least one pair of night vision goggles. In 2024 a pair of thermal binoculars was purchased by the department for spotting people in distress in the water.

Fire department

Fenwick Island is covered by the Bethany Beach Volunteer Fire Company. The department’s main station is in Bethany Beach however they operate a substation in Fenwick Island. This substation is located at the Fenwick Island Town Hall complex. The department operates many vehicles (see the Bethany Beach page's government section for more information) and although there is some speculation, it has not been fully confirmed which vehicles operate out of the main and which the substation. Both stations respond to calls in Fenwick Island.

The department has 3 shifts: A Shift, B Shift, and C Shift and each shift is staffed by 4 career members and many more volunteers. The department is a combination fire department.

== Demographics ==
Historical population
Census	Pop.	Note	%±
1960	48		—
1970	56		16.7%
1980	114		103.6%
1990	186		63.2%
2000	342		83.9%
2010	379		10.8%
2020	343		−9.5%
U.S. Decennial Census

As of the census of 2000, there were 342 people, 178 households, and 126 families residing in the town. The population density was 994.5 inhabitants per square mile (384.0/km^{2}). There were 666 housing units at an average density of 1,936.7 per square mile (747.8/km^{2}). The racial makeup of the town was 99.42% White, and 0.58% from two or more races. Hispanic or Latino of any race were 2.63% of the population.

There were 178 households, out of which 5.6% had children under the age of 18 living with them, 67.4% were married couples living together, 2.8% had a female householder with no husband present, and 28.7% were non-families. 26.4% of all households were made up of individuals, and 15.7% had someone living alone who was 65 years of age or older. The average household size was 1.92 and the average family size was 2.25.

In the town, the population was spread out, with 6.1% under the age of 18, 2.6% from 18 to 24, 11.1% from 25 to 44, 40.6% from 45 to 64, and 39.5% who were 65 years of age or older. The median age was 61 years. For every 100 females, there were 89.0 males. For every 100 females age 18 and over, there were 86.6 males.

The median income for a household in the town was $58,333, and the median income for a family was $68,750. Males had a median income of $46,607 versus $48,750 for females. The per capita income for the town was $44,415. About 3.3% of families and 8.5% of the population were below the poverty line, including none of those under age 18 and 7.1% of those age 65 or over.

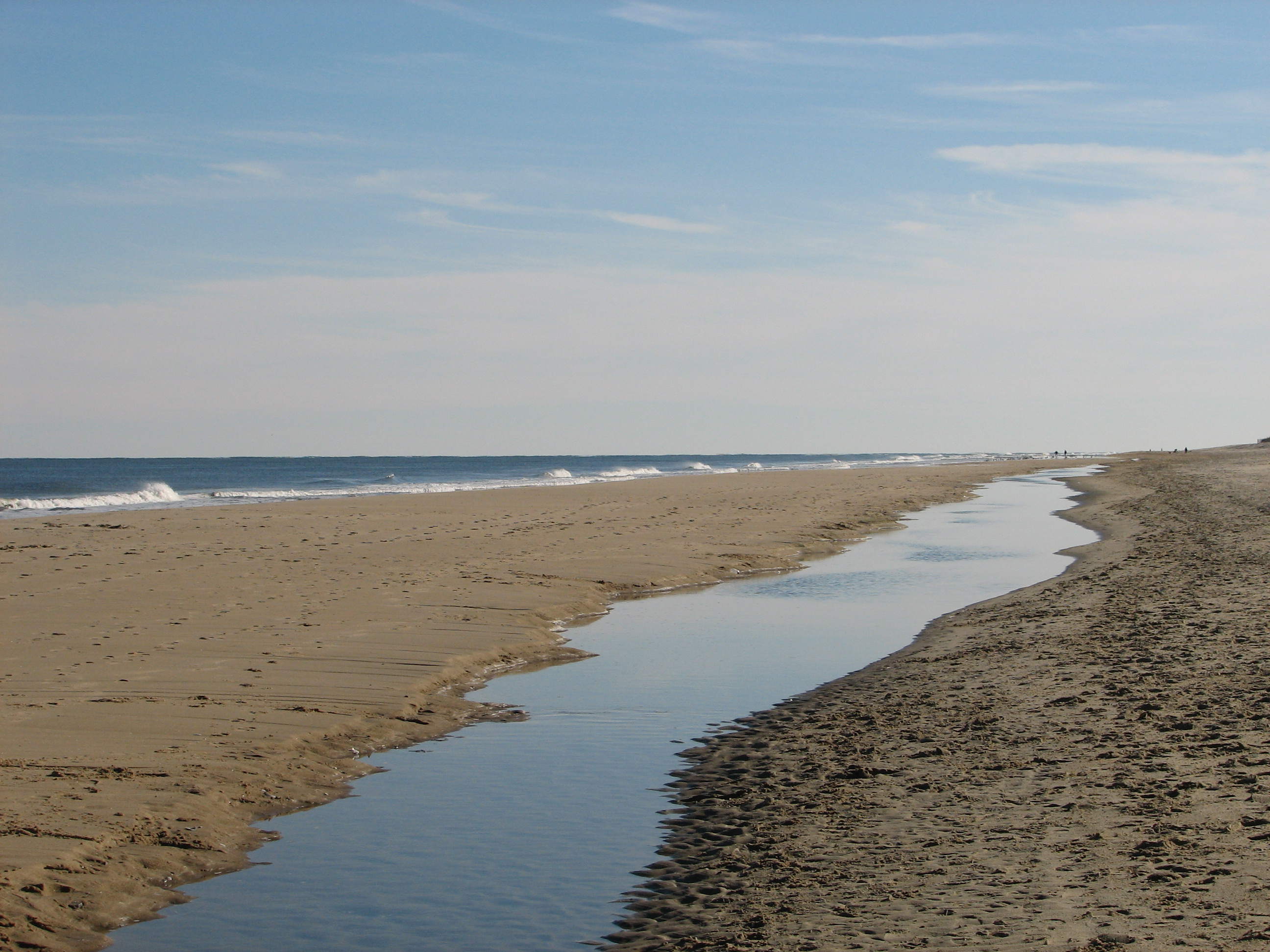
Looking south at Fenwick Island beach

Fenwick sailboats on southwest side of island

== History ==
Native Americans

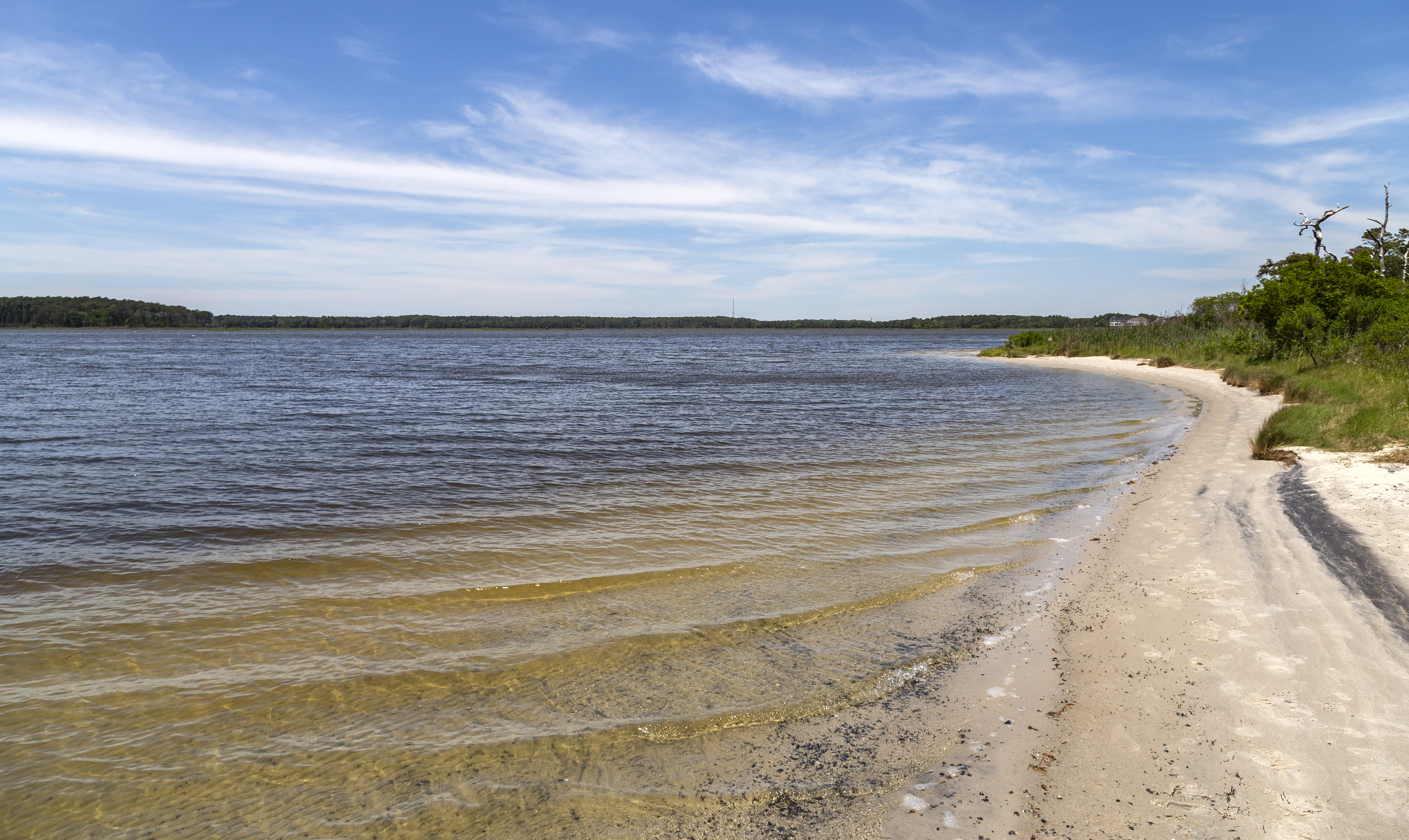
Little Assawoman Bay, 2019

There is very little information about the Native Americans in and around Fenwick Island but the Nanticoke Tribe and Assateague Tribe are the tribes that inhabited the area. It is documented that the Nanticoke Tribe inhabited Strawberry Landing, which is just northwest of the town on Little Assawoman Bay, and the Assateague Tribe inhabited the area around Indian River, which is about 30 minutes by car north of the town. Little Assawoman Bay, just west the town, is named after an Algonkian name, Assawoman, that means "midway fishing stream." Both the Nanticoke and Assateague Tribes speak Algonkian.

The Dutch, New Netherland, and British capture

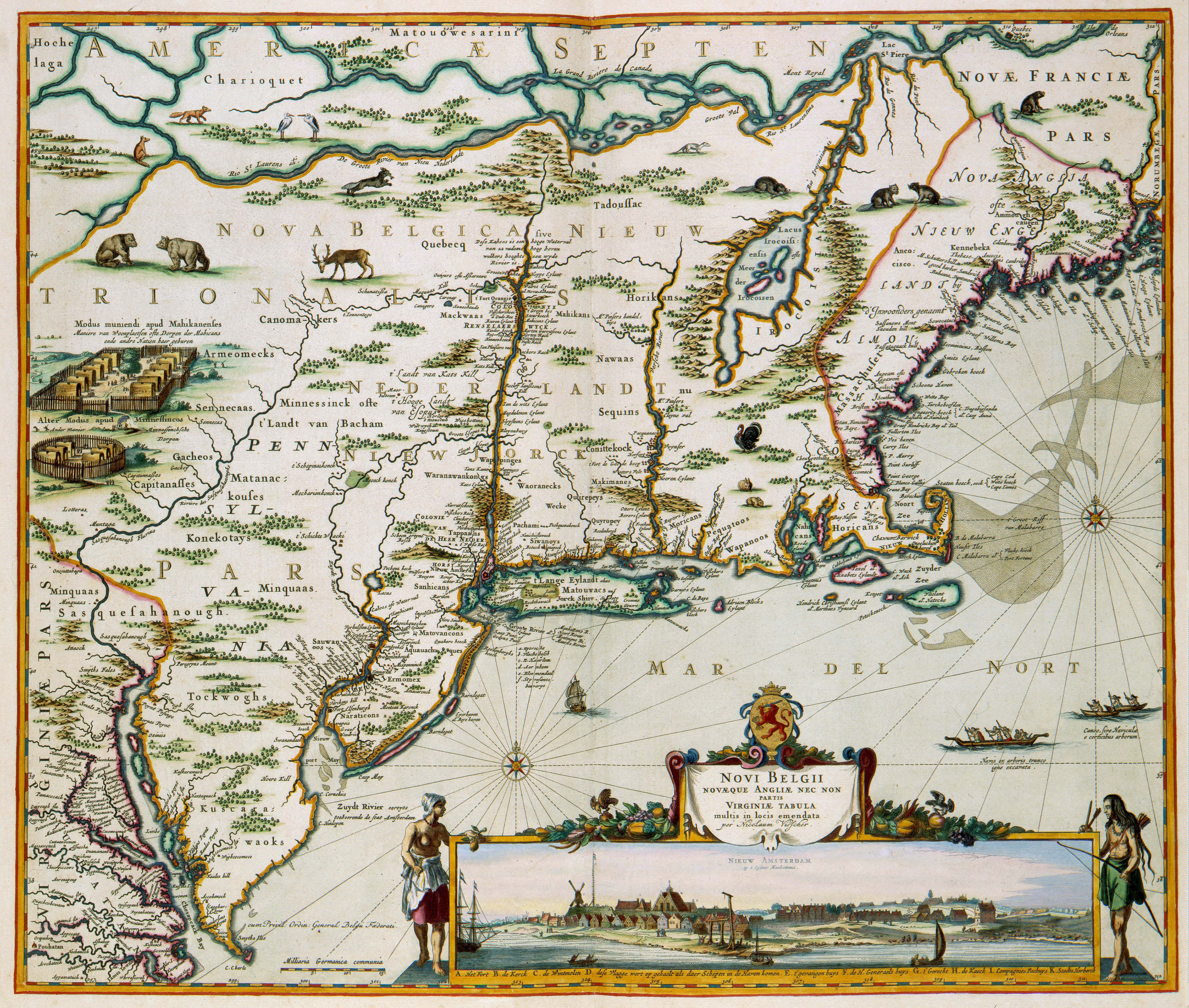
1684 map of New Netherland published by Nicolaes Visscher II. The area of Fenwick Island is called "Hindlopen."

In 1614 as the Dutch were arriving in North America and establishing the colony of New Netherland, they mapped out the coast of Delaware. Cornelius Jacobsen May was the explorer who was sent out to map the Delaware coast. In his 1614 map of the coast he calls the area around Fenwick Island "Hindlopen," sometimes the name "False Cape" was also used. This is the first known map that names the area around Fenwick Island. While the original 1614 map is lost, a 1656 and later 1684 map incorporate May's findings. In these maps the area around Fenwick Island is called "Hindlopen." The Dutch never developed Fenwick Island and left it largely uninhabited as the main Dutch settlement in Delaware was in modern day Lewes, called Zwaanendael. The British gained control over Delaware in 1665 during the Second Anglo-Dutch War after a bloodless surrender by the Dutch. The Dutch retook Delaware in 1673 during the Third Anglo-Dutch War but the British then took Delaware back for the final time in 1674, both times also bloodlessly.

Namesake and the 1700s

In and around 1700, when the British controlled Delaware, pirates operated in the area and specifically used the bay behind Fenwick Island, Little Assawoman Bay, as a shelter from local authorities. In Fenwick Island there used to be many naturally forming inlets/channels that ran from the ocean into the bay, the believed conclusion is that these inlets are what the pirates used to get their ships into the bay. Local legend states that Cedar Island in Little Assawoman Bay was the pirates base of operations and a spot for the pirates to bury treasure. Regardless of the truth of the legend, Little Assawoman Bay and the Delaware coastal area as a whole was a well known place for pirates to hide from the law. Cedar Island has just about washed under the bay, as Seal Island did around 2010.

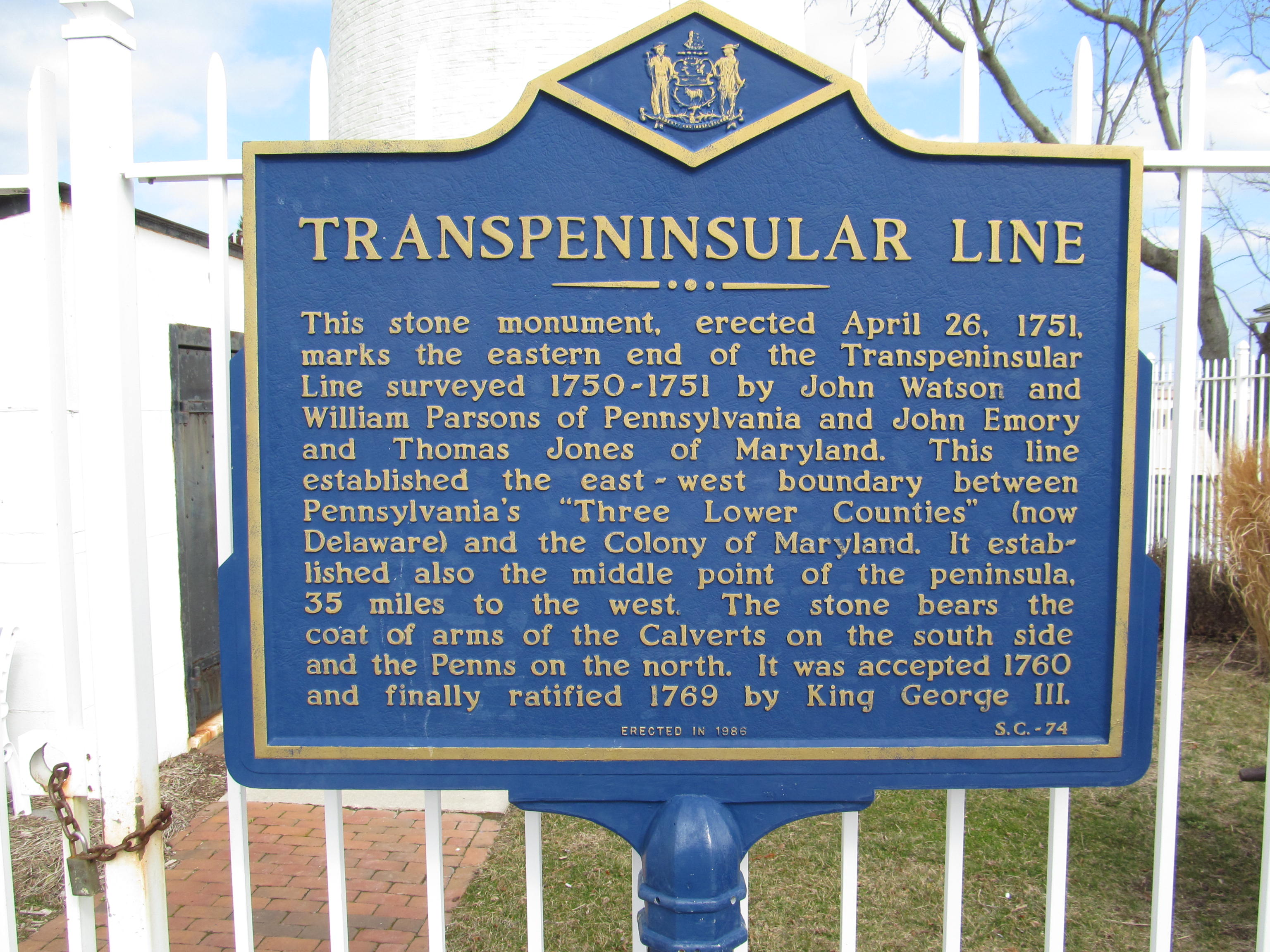
The Transpeninsular Line marker in Fenwick Island. The line settled a part of the Penn-Baltimore border dispute about the borders of Pennsylvania, Maryland, and Delaware

Thomas Fenwick, a planter from England who settled in Maryland, was the owner of the land during the years surrounding 1700 and the land was therefore named after him. Fenwick Island lay in the part of Delaware which Lord Baltimore and his heirs claimed during the Penn–Baltimore border dispute.

In the late 1700s Fenwick Island was a small "hotspot" for salt collection. People would dig holes in the "back of the dunes" where there was very salty water and they would boil that water until it was just the salt. The salt would then be shipped to surrounding communities and counties, even Philadelphia. The price was $2 a bushel but increased to $3 because of shortages due to the War of 1812. In the 1870s the salt collection in Fenwick Island had stopped due to the cheaper salt mining in other parts of the country.

1932 Prohibition "Shootout"

In 1932 Fenwick Island consisted of a few meeting grounds for camps including a hotel, Fenwick Island Light, and some summer cottages built by squatters.

During an interrogation in Dover, police found out about a future rum-running operation in Fenwick Island. Delaware State Police asked the Coast Guard station nearby, Indian River Life-Saving Station, to keep an eye out and before sunrise on the stormy morning of October 3rd a Coast Guardsmen patrolling the area spotted a wagon moving across the beach. Fenwick Island was thought to be empty as the camps were not in session at the time. Alarm was raised, the State Police got word, and they headed to the area. The police raised the island's drawbridge as to not allow the run-runners to leave the island. Once the police arrived a mothership could be seen offshore, highlighted by lightning flashes, and two smaller boats could be seen coming ashore. One small boat had already made it ashore but the other one tried to turn around, however the crew had trouble rowing in the stormy seas, abandoned the boat, and tried to swim. The Coast Guardsmen opened fire and got the men to come ashore. They then gave orders to the mothership but the ship fled for open water. The State Police and Coast Guardsmen opened fire on the ship with their rifles but the ship managed to get away. The police then followed the wagon tracks to the empty hotel where 200 cases of alcohol were found, totaled around $30,000 at the time. Five people were arrested during the incident. The event made national news for a short time and was a big discovery for the area.

Incorporation

The town was an unincorporated area between South Bethany and Ocean City, Maryland, until July 1953, when the Delaware General Assembly passed an act to incorporate the town. Local sentiment demanded incorporation to prevent the relentless high-rise development of Ocean City from creeping north into Fenwick Island. Before incorporation, in 1941, Delaware kicked out the squatters and the permanent population began to slowly grow. Fenwick Island's population was 48 in 1960.

== Education ==
Residents are served by the Indian River School District.

== Elections ==
Fenwick Island is one of several Delaware towns that gives corporations and other legal entities voting power in municipal elections. On May 26, 2026, Delaware Superior Court Judge Craig Karsnitz ruled that Fenwick Island's permission of these votes did not violate the election clause of Delaware's constitution, which reads "All elections shall be free and equal."

== Notable people ==
- Deborah Birx, physician, diplomat, White House Coronavirus Task Force coordinator

== See also ==
- Transpeninsular Line
- Delmarva Peninsula
- Delaware Seashore State Park
- Fenwick Island Light
- Fenwick Island State Park

Preceded by Fenwick Island State Park	Beaches of Delmarva	Succeeded by Ocean City, Maryland
