= Fenwick High School =

Fenwick High School may refer to:

- Fenwick High School (Oak Park, Illinois)
- Bishop Fenwick High School (Franklin, Ohio)
- Bishop Fenwick High School (Peabody, Massachusetts)
- Fenwick High School in Lancaster, Ohio, renamed William V. Fisher Catholic High School

== See also ==
- Bishop Fenwick High School (disambiguation)
