= South Bethany, Delaware =

- Town
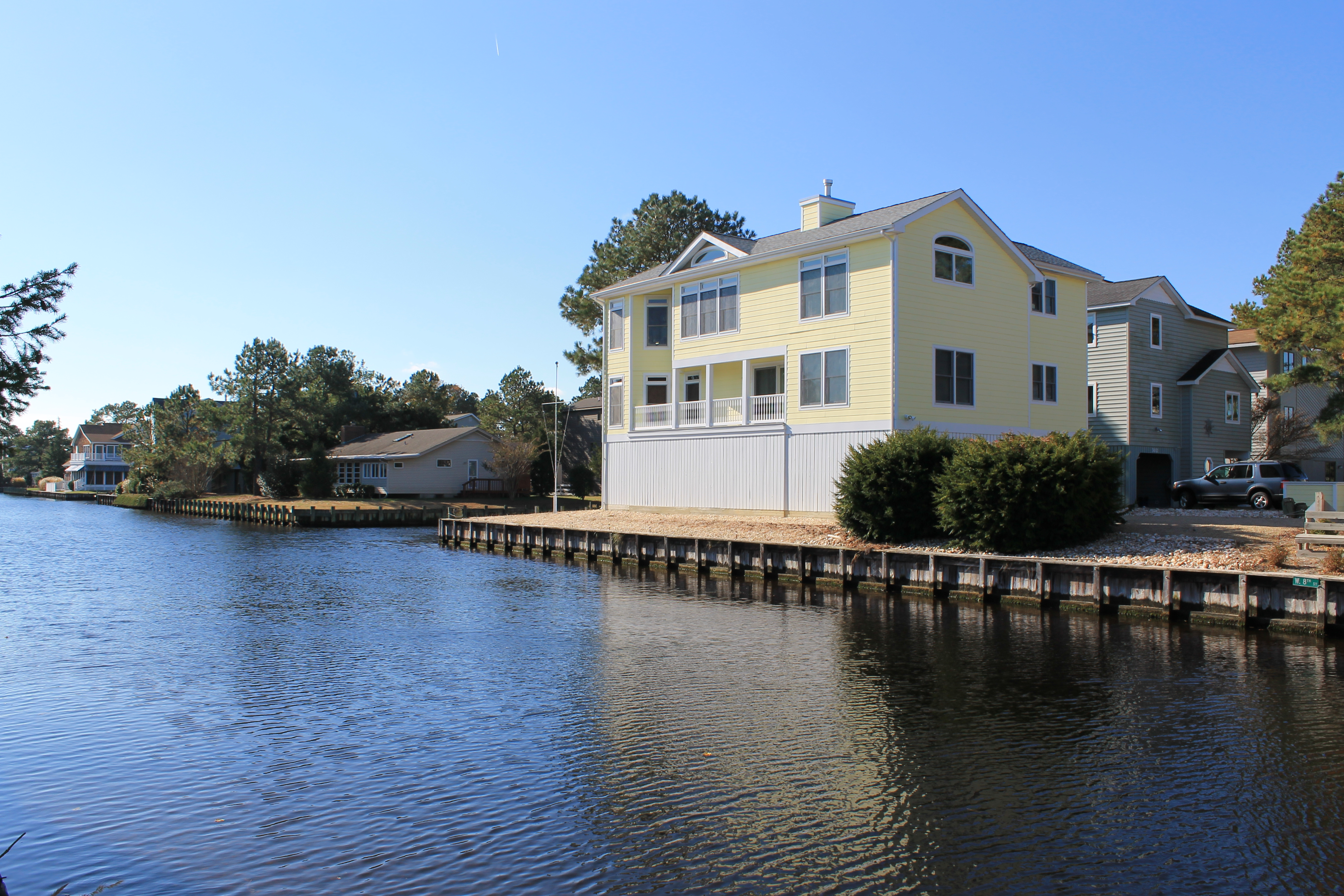
- Homes along the water in South Bethany

- Seal

- Location of South Bethany in Sussex County, Delaware.

- Location within the state of Delaware South Bethany (the United States)
- Coordinates: 38°30′59″N 75°03′11″W
- Country: United States
- State: Delaware
- County: Sussex

Government
  - Type: Council-manager
  - Mayor: Tim Saxton

Area
  - Total: 0.53 sq mi (1.36 km^{2})
  - Land: 0.50 sq mi (1.30 km^{2})
  - Water: 0.019 sq mi (0.05 km^{2})
- Elevation: 3 ft (0.91 m)

Population (2020)
  - Total: 451
  - Density: 896.7/sq mi (346.23/km^{2})
- Time zone: UTC−5 (Eastern (EST))
  - Summer (DST): UTC−4 (EDT)
- ZIP code: 19930
- Area code: 302
- FIPS code: 10-67700
- GNIS feature ID: 214675
- Website: southbethany.delaware.gov

South Bethany is an incorporated town in Sussex County, Delaware, United States. As of the 2020 census, South Bethany had a population of 451. It is part of the Salisbury, Maryland-Delaware Metropolitan Statistical Area.

South Bethany is popularly considered one of "The Quiet Resorts", along with its direct neighbor to the north, Bethany Beach, and its neighbor to the south, Fenwick Island. This is in contradistinction to the crowded atmosphere of the more popular Dewey Beach and the cosmopolitan bustle of nearby Rehoboth Beach. Assisting South Bethany's reputation as a "quiet" place is the presence of Delaware Seashore State Park – a six-mile-long barrier island providing a substantial buffer from Dewey Beach's noise – to the north of Bethany Beach, as well as the relative quiet provided by a large unincorporated area of private condominiums and multimillion-dollar beach homes between the park and Bethany Beach. To the south, South Bethany is insulated from busy Ocean City, Maryland, by Fenwick Island State Park and Fenwick Island itself.

Unlike Bethany Beach and neighboring Fenwick Island, South Bethany is almost exclusively residential. It refers to itself as "The Best Little Beach in Delaware."

== Geography ==
South Bethany is located at 38°30′59″N 75°03′11″W (38.5165008, –75.0529585).

According to the United States Census Bureau, the town has a total area of 0.5 square miles (1.3 km^{2}), of which nearly the full 0.5 square miles (1.3 km^{2}) is land and 1.89% is water. The views and landscapes of the area are very popular with the locals and vacationers.

As the community is located on the local barrier islands, it is subject to tides, which can fluctuate up to multiple feet per day.

== Demographics ==
Historical population
Census	Pop.	Note	%±
1970	24		—
1980	115		379.2%
1990	148		28.7%
2000	492		232.4%
2010	449		−8.7%
2020	451		0.4%
U.S. Decennial Census

As of the census of 2000, there were 492 people, 253 households, and 170 families residing in the town. The population density was 948.6 inhabitants per square mile (366.3/km^{2}). There were 1,137 housing units at an average density of 2,192.1 units per square mile (846.4 units/km^{2}). The racial makeup of the town was 99.19% White, 0.20% Asian, and 0.61% from two or more races.

There were 253 households, out of which 9.5% had children under the age of 18 living with them, 60.9% were married couples living together, 3.2% had a female householder with no husband present, and 32.8% were non-families. 29.6% of all households were made up of individuals, and 13.0% had someone living alone who was 65 years of age or older. The average household size was 1.94 and the average family size was 2.32.

In the town, the population was spread out, with 8.7% under the age of 18, 2.0% from 18 to 24, 14.0% from 25 to 44, 40.0% from 45 to 64, and 35.2% who were 65 years of age or older. The median age was 60 years. For every 100 females, there were 95.2 males. For every 100 females age 18 and over, there were 103.2 males.

The median income for a household in the town was $67,125, and the median income for a family was $89,666. Males had a median income of $61,250 versus $37,500 for females. The per capita income for the town was $53,624. None of the families and 1.6% of the population were living below the poverty line, including no under eighteens and 3.1% of those over 64.

== Government ==
South Bethany has a town manager form of government. In addition to an elected mayor, the town has a six-member elected town council. It has a local police department as well as a beach patrol.

Mayors

- James Cleveland (1969–1972) (became mayor when the community was founded)
- Harold B. Barber (1972–1973)
- Walter J. Scott (1973–1974)
- John C. Williamson (1974–1975)
- Robert S. Terrill (1975–1976)
- Robert J. McCarthy (1976–1977)
- Ronald L. Steen (1977–1980)
- Margaret C. Gassinger (1980–1986)
- Herbert "Joe" Schaefer (1986–1988)
- Mary Jane Lindblad (1988–1989)
- Harry Woodruff (1989–1990)
- Herbert "Joe" Schaefer (1990–2000)
- Theodore J. Marcucilli (2000–2001)
- Sal V. Aiello (2001–2002)
- Donald H. Beck (2002–2004)
- Gary L. Jayne (2004–2010)
- Jay Headman (2010–2012)
- Kathy Jankowski (2012–2014)
- Pat Voveris (2014–2018)
- Tim Saxton (2018–2024)
- Edith Dondero (2024–Present)

== Infrastructure ==
=== Transportation ===
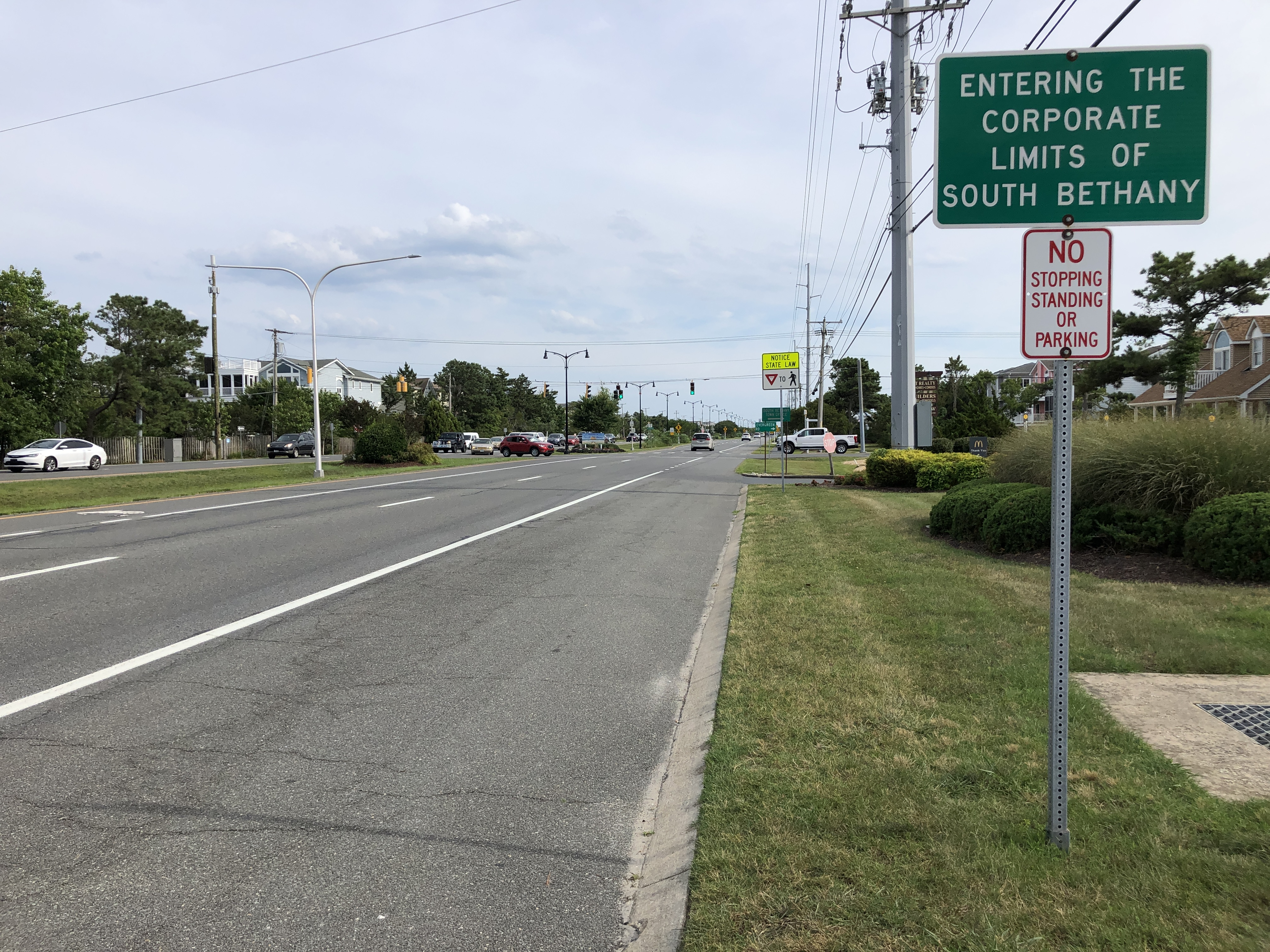
DE 1 southbound entering South Bethany

Delaware Route 1 (Coastal Highway) serves as the main north–south road in South Bethany, heading north along the coast to Bethany Beach, Dewey Beach, and Rehoboth Beach and south along the coast to Fenwick Island and Ocean City, Maryland. Parking permits are required along selected streets in South Bethany between May 15 and September 15. DART First State provides bus service to South Bethany in the summer months along Beach Bus Route 208, which heads north to the Rehoboth Beach Park and Ride and the Lewes Transit Center Park and Ride near Lewes to connect to other Beach Bus routes and the Route 305 bus from Wilmington and south to the 144th Street Transit Center in Ocean City, Maryland to connect to Ocean City Transportation's Coastal Highway Beach Bus.

=== Utilities ===
Delmarva Power, a subsidiary of Exelon, provides electricity to South Bethany. Chesapeake Utilities provides natural gas to the town. Artesian Water Company, a subsidiary of Artesian Resources, provides water to South Bethany. Sussex County operates the South Bethany Sanitary Sewer District, which provides sewer service to the town. Trash and recycling collection in South Bethany is provided by Republic Services.

== History ==
=== Early history ===
There is no record of Native American activity in what is now South Bethany, but Native Americans are known to have visited the bays and rivers of the Atlantic coast of Delaware during the summer to fish, and it is possible that this included visits to the South Bethany area.

The portion of Delaware in which South Bethany lies was subject to a lengthy legal dispute, Penn vs. Baltimore, that broke out in 1683, as to whether the land belonged to the Province of Maryland or the Province of Pennsylvania. While it dragged on, William Penn granted the Delaware Colony its own legislature in 1701, establishing it as a separate colony. The dispute over the boundaries of the three colonies was not resolved until 1759, when the parties to the dispute agreed that the area where South Bethany now lies was part of Delaware.

Outside of Penn vs. Baltimore, recorded European interest in the land that was to become South Bethany dates to at least 1687, when an Englishman, Matthew Scarborough, had much of the area of what are now Bethany Beach and South Bethany surveyed, the 500 acres (200 hectares) surveyed in the northern part of the area becoming known as "Scarborough's Adventure," while a 500-acre (200-hectare) parcel to its south became known as "Middlesex." He "took up" – i.e., took possession of – the two parcels of land in 1688, and they were renamed "North Petherton" and "South Petherton." The part of the area that would become South Bethany was included in a 430-acre (170-hectare) portion of South Petherton at the head of Little Assawoman Bay about two miles (3.2 km) south of what is now Bethany Beach granted to Scarborough under a Maryland land patent in 1695.

English settlers established farms in parts of what is now South Bethany. In 1741, Englishman William Evans was granted a land patent under a survey that combined North and South Petherton into a single parcel of land.

In 1926, George McClellan of Long Island, New York, bought four adjoining tracts of land in what is now South Bethany covering a combined 140 acres (57 hectares). McLellan conveyed the land to the Delaware Shore Land Corporation.

=== Founding of South Bethany ===
In 1952, the first span of the Chesapeake Bay Bridge opened, greatly improving access to the Delmarva Peninsula from Baltimore, Maryland, and Washington, D.C., and spurring a great deal of growth and new investment in the Bethany Beach area. That year, Richard Hall and Elizabeth "Iggie" Hall purchased about 130 acres (53 hectares) of marsh land and old farm land from the Delaware Shore Land Corporation. Doing business as the South Bethany Corporation, the Halls sold 50-by-100-foot (15.2-by-30.5-meter) lots to people wishing to build vacation houses on the Delaware coast and named the new community "South Bethany" in order to exploit the popularity among vacationers of Bethany Beach, just to the north. The Halls conceived of South Bethany as strictly residential, with no businesses of any kind within its boundaries. For the next 10 years, the South Bethany Corporation worked to drain and raise marshland to allow additional buildable lots and dug five miles (8.0 km) of canals in the community to ensure that people who purchased a lot in South Bethany would have either direct access to the beach along the Atlantic Ocean – where the community provided no lifeguard service, its only safety measure being a torpedo-style life preserver hanging from a post on the beach – or would reside along a canal offering access to inland bays and rivers by boat. By 1959, when a lot cost $1,050 and required a $200 down payment, they had sold 500 lots in South Bethany.

Access to the community was via Delaware Route 14, known as Coastal Highway, a paved two-lane road with no shoulders. As the community grew, Route 14 became inadequate for the automobile traffic South Bethany generated, and in 1958 Route 14 was expanded into a four-lane divided highway; it was redesignated as a portion of Delaware Route 1 in the 1970s. At the time, the Delaware Army National Guard would drive its tracked self-propelled anti-aircraft guns from its barracks north of Bethany Beach down Coastal Highway through Bethany Beach and South Bethany to its training grounds just south of South Bethany, where it would engage in antiaircraft training, firing at target drones flying over the Atlantic.

=== Incorporation and expansion ===
==== 1960s through 1990s ====
Although Iggie Hall of the South Bethany Corporation tried to have South Bethany incorporated as a town even in its early years in order to improve services in the community, she had no success. Meanwhile, a group of South Bethany residents formed the South Bethany Association to address community services and needs.

A destructive nor'easter known as the Ash Wednesday Storm of 1962 struck the area from March 6 to 8, 1962. Delaware's Atlantic coast experienced severe damage from very high tides and waves more than 40 feet (12 meters) high breaking on its beaches. In South Bethany, the storm destroyed 37 oceanfront homes. The 1962 storm gave a new impetus to incorporation, because as an unincorporated community South Bethany could not receive federal funding to recover from the disaster. The Delaware General Assembly rebuffed the initial efforts to incorporate the community after the storm, claiming that its tiny year-round population disqualified it from incorporation. The assembly eventually did pass an incorporation bill, which the governor of Delaware, Charles L. Terry, Jr., signed in December 1965. In the first public referendum in South Bethany on incorporation, held in June 1966, voters decisively rejected it. But in 1969 another referendum on the matter won, and on June 18, 1969, Governor Russell W. Peterson signed a bill providing for incorporation of the community as the Town of South Bethany. Elections for town offices soon took place, and James "Jim" Cleveland was elected as the town's first mayor. At the time, South Bethany had 240 houses and 496 property owners, although its year-round population consisted of just 15 families.

Plans for a beach and tennis community, Sea Colony, centered on nine high-rise condominiums situated on a private beach between South Bethany and Bethany Beach, began in 1969; these buildings, the area's first and only high-rises, opened in the early 1970s. The 1,200-townhome Sea Colony West low-rise beach and tennis resort development later was added just inland. Plans for Sea Colony met bitter opposition from longtime South Bethany and Bethany Beach residents, who were dismayed at the thought of high-rises and large crowds in the area. Opponents of Sea Colony marched in protest and engaged in protracted legal efforts to block construction of the resort, but the property lay outside the town limits of both South Bethany and Bethany Beach, and their efforts to block the construction of Sea Colony failed. Sea Colony went on to become a very successful resort.

In 1971, South Bethany hired its first police officer. On June 18, 1971, its first lifeguards went to work to ensure safety on the town's Atlantic beach.

In 1972, South Bethany expanded southward, annexing the York Beach community – a plot of land known from 1812 to 1946 as "Derickson's Venture" – and the Paradise Shores community adjacent to and to the west of York Beach. The annexation of York Beach brought York Beach Mall – opened in 1959 and expanded in 1965 – into South Bethany, giving the town its first and only commercial area. In the same year, South Bethany began installing a central sewer system, and Sussex County prohibited construction in the town within 1,000 feet (300 meters) of the ocean in the hope of restoring the main dune.

In 1977, South Bethany's sewer system was completed, and the community installed its first two traffic signals, located on Coastal Highway at the north and south ends of the town. Also in that year, South Bethany received a federal grant to construct its first town hall, located on land Iggie Hall had donated for that purpose; the town hall opened in 1978. In January 1981, the Delaware Supreme Court lifted Sussex County's ban on construction on the dune, and development of the beach area resumed.

In August 1983, property owners formed the South Bethany Property Owners Association, and that year the town annexed the neighboring Sand Piper Pines community. At the time South Bethany consisted of 1,282 separate properties, 748 houses, and 105 year-round residents. During the mid-1980s, a beach replenishment project took place along the town's Atlantic coast to recover sand lost during major storms. On November 19, 1987, South Bethany expanded its boundary westward by annexing the Cat Hill community, and on March 22, 1992, Cat Hill conveyed 22 acres (8.9 hectares) of wetlands to the town.

In 1998, South Bethany voted for the installation of a water tower and central water system. Also in that year, the installation of propane lines began in South Bethany; the town began installation of an underground propane storage tank behind the town hall to feed the system in October 2003, and the system began supplying propane to residents and businesses in the early 2000s.

==== Since 2000 ====
In 2000, South Bethany's Community Enhancement Committee launched the town's Adopt-A-Canal/Road-End Program, in which community volunteers renovate and maintain the landscaping at the ends of canals and roads in South Bethany; by October 2015, volunteers had adopted 32 of the town's 48 canal ends and road ends. In 2007, South Bethany demolished its original town hall and replaced it with a new town hall and police building. Around this time period, the community became famous for its nudist beaches.

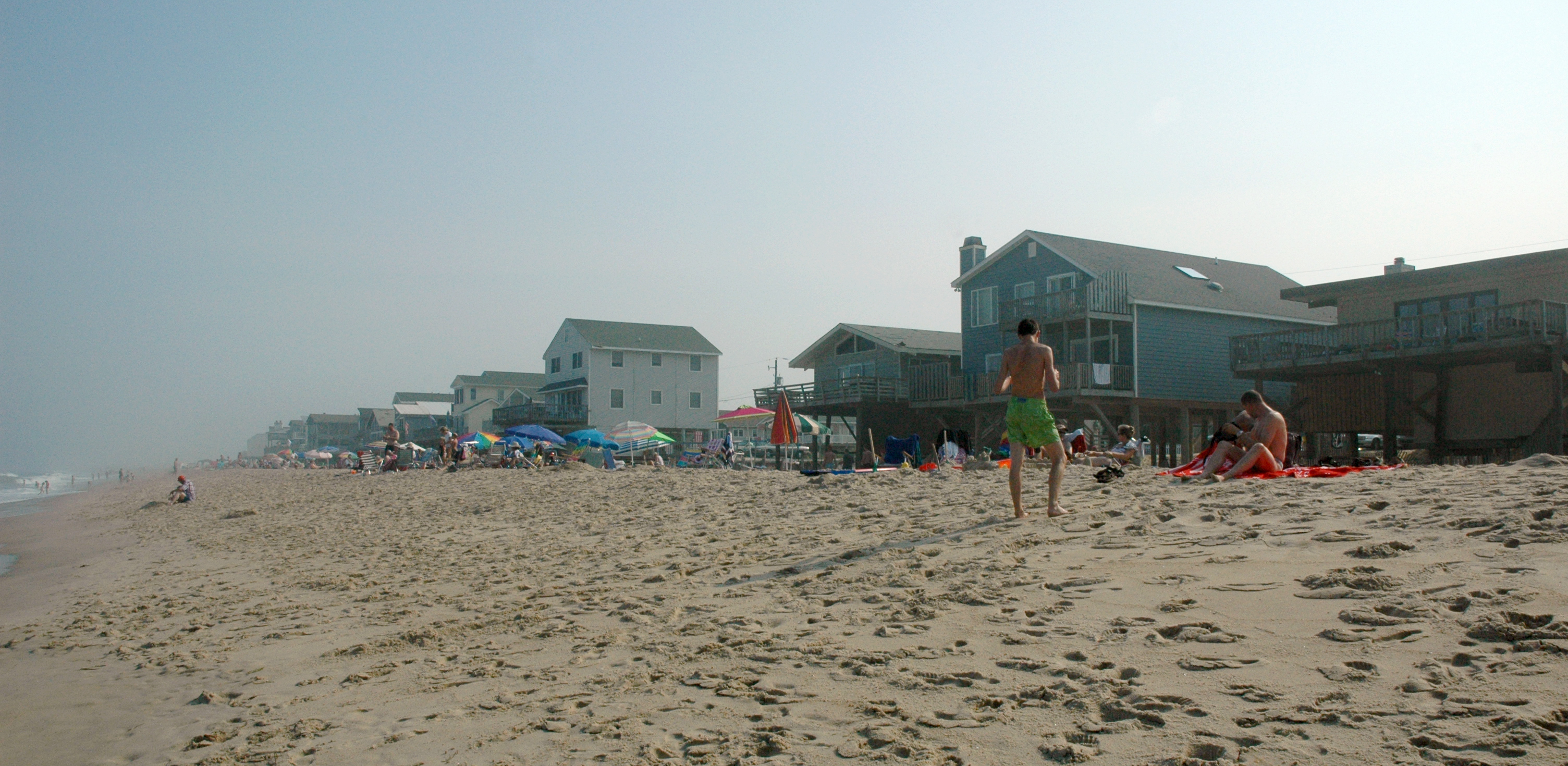
South Bethany beach in 2007, prior to the construction of sand dunes.

In 2008, the State of Delaware and United States Army Corps of Engineers constructed 16-foot (4.9-meter) sand dunes along South Bethany's beach to protect the town from high tides and large waves during hurricanes and nor'easters. The State of Delaware issued a mandatory evacuation order for beachfront residents and visitors in the town when Hurricane Sandy threatened the area on October 28 and 29, 2012.

In 2014, South Bethany's Community Enhancement Committee created the Art Board initiative, which invited artists from the area to submit artwork with a coastal theme for display on outdoor trash receptacles along Ocean Drive and Seaside Drive. By 2015, the town consisted of approximately 1,387 properties with fewer than 175 vacant lots remaining, and its year-round population was 600.

A nor'easter hit the Delaware coast from October 2 to 4, 2015, and severely eroded South Bethany's beach and dune. The beach and dune suffered additional damage during a winter storm that struck the area from January 22 to 24, 2016. In February 2016, officials announced that there was no funding available for replenishment of South Bethany's beach and dune during 2016, and that replenishment would not take place until 2017, in accordance with the schedule established before the two storms hit.

In 2020, the United States Army Corps of Engineers awarded a contract to a local developer to maintain the beach and dunes damaged in the storms.

== Education ==
Residents are in the Indian River School District.

Preceded by Middlesex Beach	Beaches of Delmarva	Succeeded by York Beach
