= Fenwick Tower, Northumberland =

Fenwick Tower
- Location in Northumberland

General information
- Location: Northumberland, England, UK
- Coordinates: 55.050429°N 1.9116466°W
- OS grid: NZ0574372885

Fenwick Tower was a 12th-century tower house at Fenwick, Matfen, Northumberland, England.

The house was the home of the Fenwick family from the 12th century until they moved to Wallington in the 16th century.

In 1378 John Fenwick was granted a licence to crenelate the house. The tower was largely demolished in about 1775 at which time a hoard of medieval gold coins was discovered.

The sparse remains of the tower are now incorporated into a 17th-century farmhouse and are protected by Grade II listed building status.

On 15 February 2010 human remains were found buried next to a cottage in the hamlet of Fenwick Towers. Radio-carbon dating of the remains indicated they likely dated to the 13th or 14th centuries.
