= Fenwick Island Light =

Lighthouse in Delaware, United States

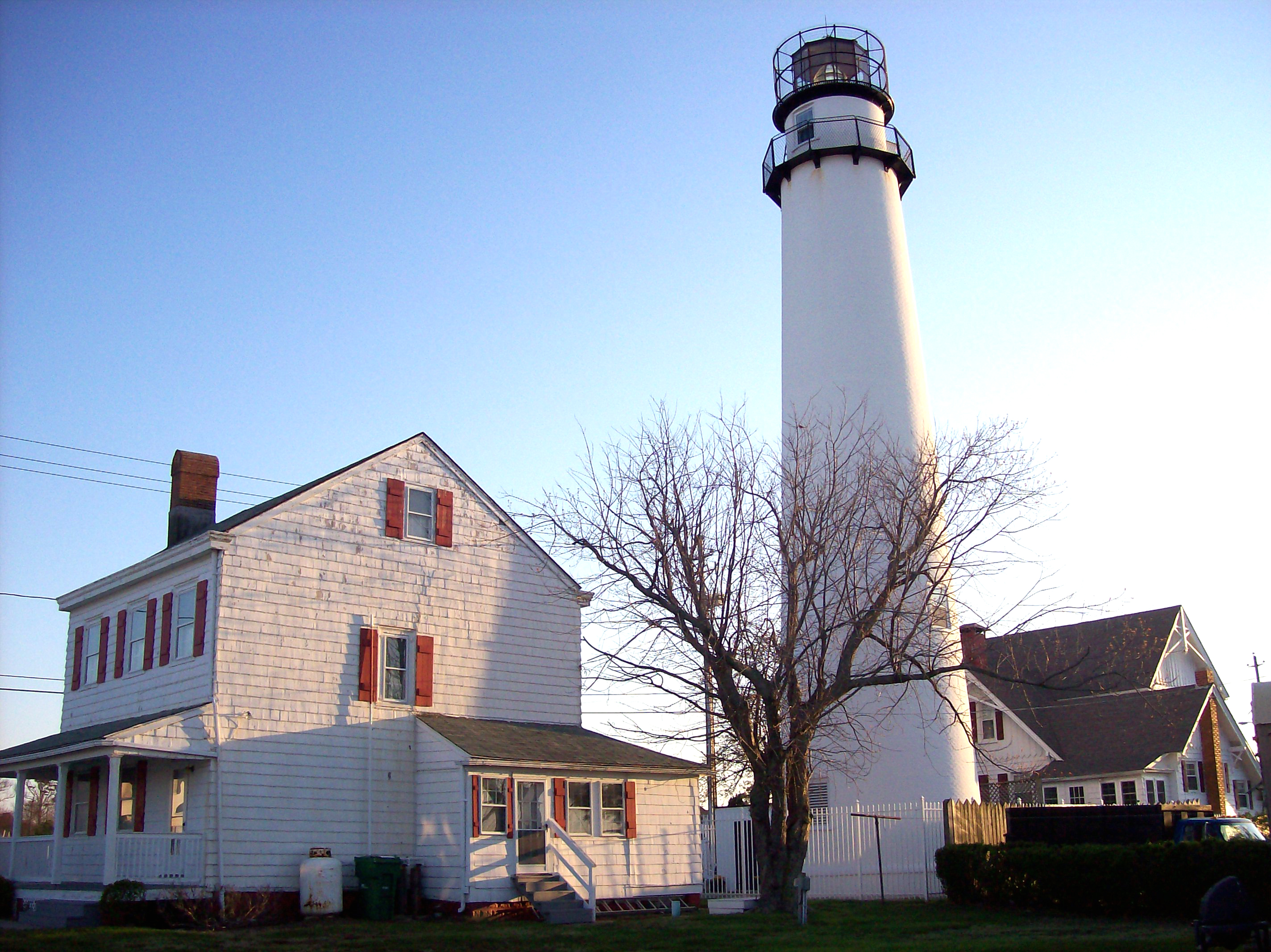
- Spring 2008
- Location: Fenwick Island, Delaware
- Coordinates: 38°27′05″N 75°03′18″W

Tower
- Constructed: 1858
- Foundation: Natural
- Construction: Brick
- Automated: 1940
- Height: 87 feet (27 m)
- Shape: Conical
- Heritage: National Register of Historic Places listed place

Light
- First lit: 1859
- Deactivated: 1978-1982
- Focal height: 25 m (82 ft)
- Lens: Third order Fresnel lens
- Range: 15 nautical miles (28 km; 17 mi)
- Characteristic: White flash every 13s
- Fenwick Island Lighthouse Station
- U.S. National Register of Historic Places
- Area: 218 acres (88 ha)
- Built: 1858
- Architectural style: Gothic
- NRHP reference No.: 79000642
- Added to NRHP: August 13, 1979

Fenwick Island Lighthouse is a lighthouse in Delaware, United States, on the Delaware/Maryland state line. The structure dates back to 1858 making it the oldest lighthouse in the state of Delaware.

== History ==
In 1856, the United States Congress appropriated $25,000 for the Fenwick Island Lighthouse and on January 11, 1858 a ten-acre tract for the station was obtained from Mary C. Hall for only $50. The Fenwick Island Lighthouse was completed on December 29, 1858, but would not be lit until August 1, 1859. Construction was supervised by U.S. Army Captain William F. Raynolds. The lighthouse was built on an isolated peninsula in the southernmost portion of Delaware at the Maryland state line. It is 87 feet tall, brick, with a central cast iron spiral staircase, and equipped with a third-order Fresnel lens. It was automated in 1940.

The lighthouse was decommissioned in 1978 and remained dark for several years. A public movement to save the lighthouse resulted in ownership of the lighthouse being transferred to the State of Delaware, and the lighthouse was relit in 1982. In 1997, after extensive fundraising efforts made it possible, the rapidly aging lighthouse underwent a full restoration. It was rededicated in July 1998.

The lighthouse is owned by the state of Delaware and maintained by the private, non-profit New Friends of the Fenwick Island Lighthouse. The "isolated" lighthouse now stands surrounded by a neighborhood of houses and businesses. Visitors can enter the base to view a small museum and gift shop. The lighthouse, however, is not open for climbing.

It was added to the National Register of Historic Places in 1979.

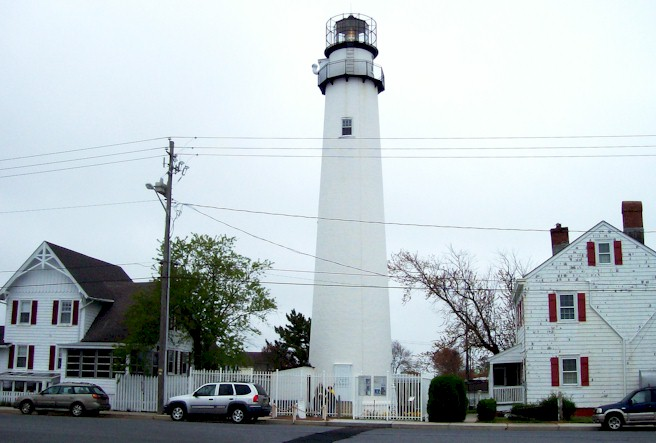
Spring 2008

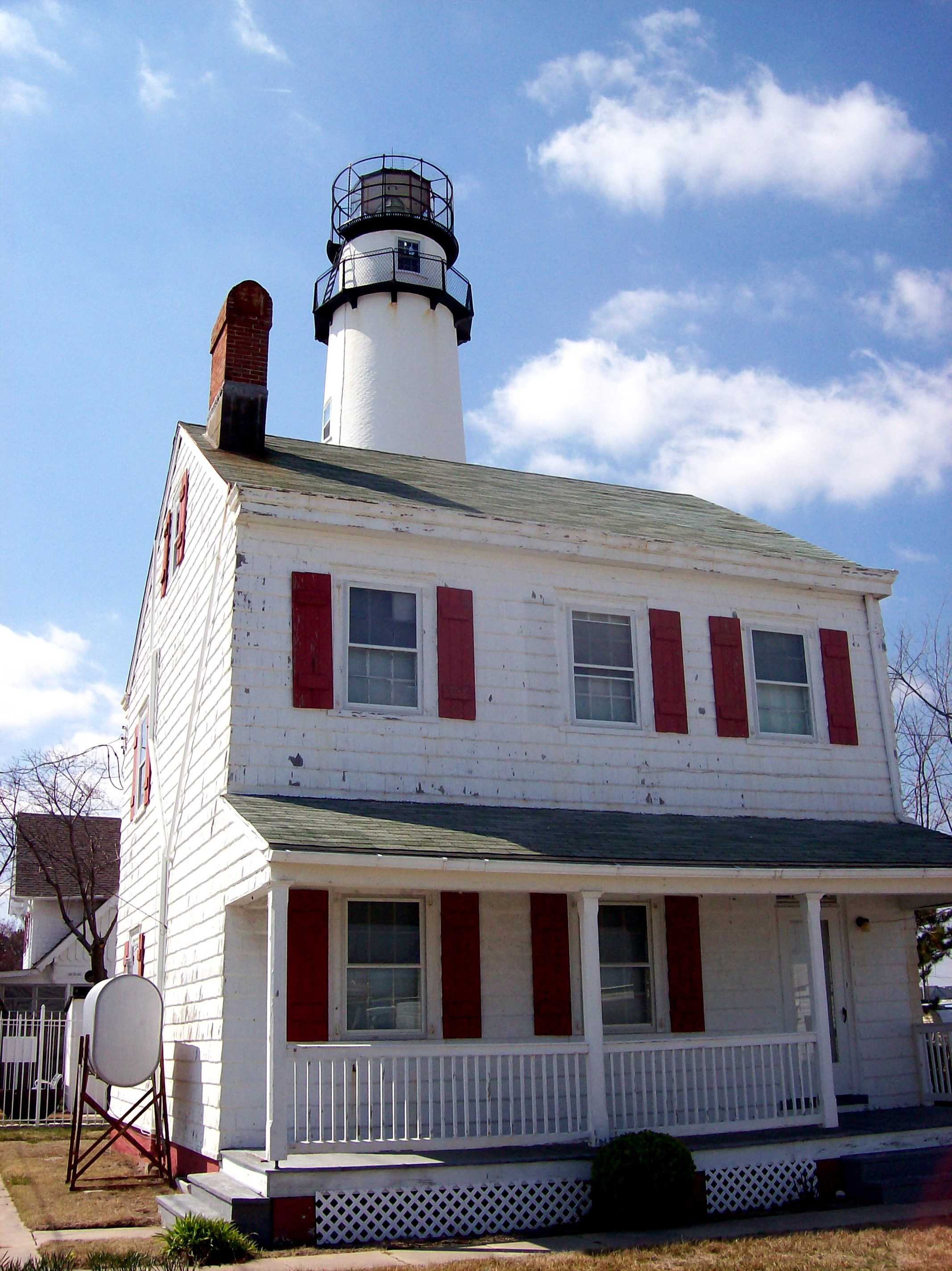
Looking west-northwest (2009)

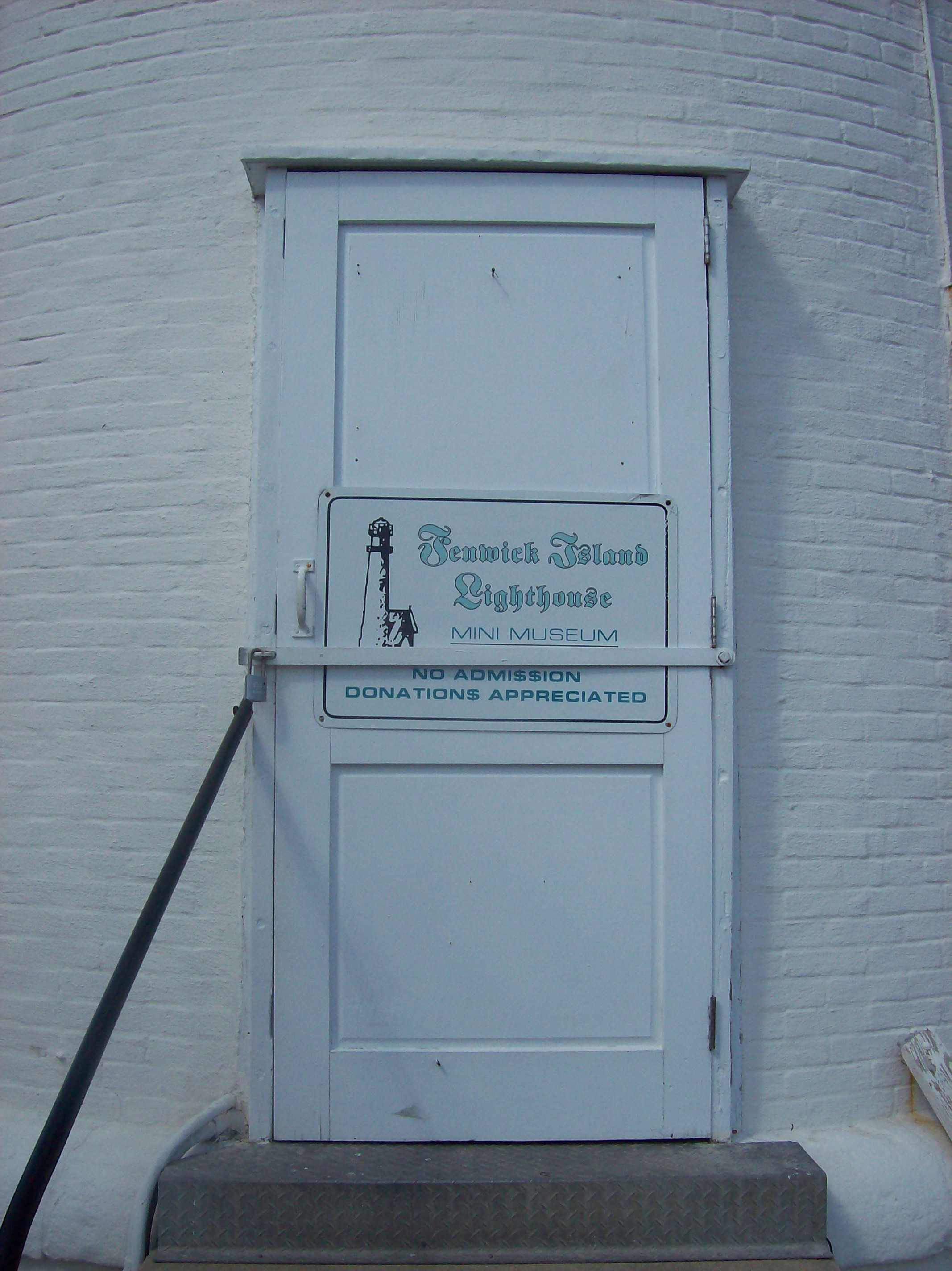
Main entrance to lighthouse (2009)

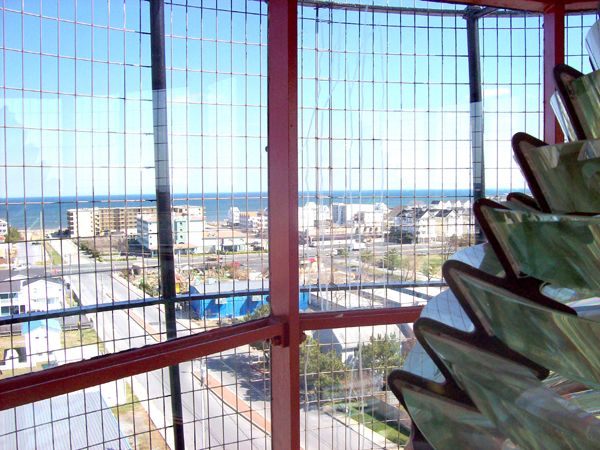
Lantern room
