= Fenwick Island (Delaware–Maryland) =

Barrier island along the Atlantic Ocean

Coordinates: 38°27′12″N 75°02′54″W

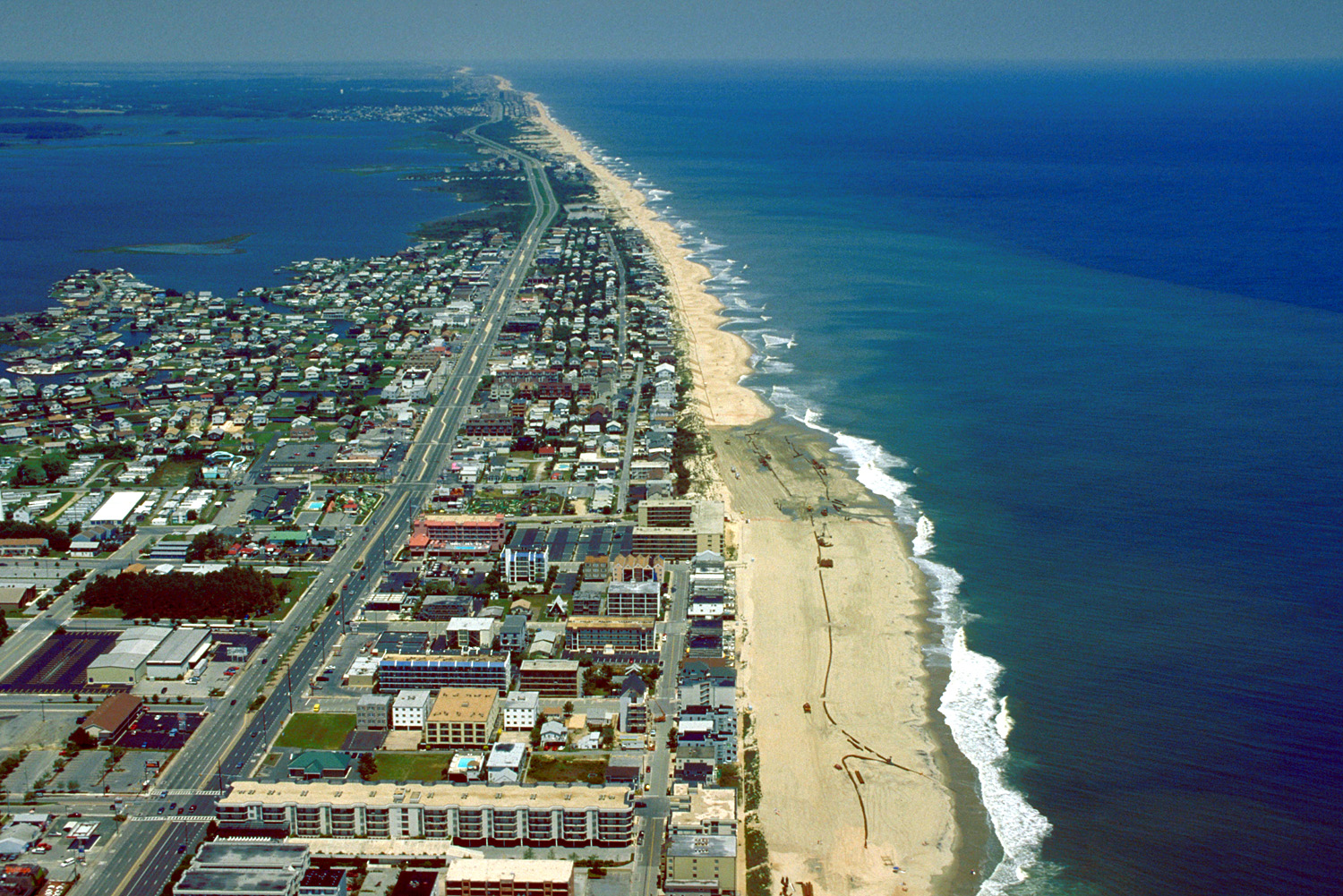
Aerial view of Fenwick Island. Ocean City, Maryland is at the bottom of the photograph, Fenwick Island, Delaware is in the middle, and Fenwick Island State Park can be seen toward the top.

Fenwick Island is a barrier spit along the Atlantic Ocean in Delaware and Maryland in the United States. It contains the communities of South Bethany and Fenwick Island in Delaware along with Ocean City, Maryland. Until 1933, it was attached to Assateague Island to the south. That year, a hurricane carved an inlet between the two landforms, which was made permanent. If not for the Assawoman Canal, constructed by the U.S. Army Corps of Engineers in 1891, the island would be attached to the mainland of Delaware.
