= Indian River Bay =

Bay in Sussex County, Delaware, US

Coordinates: 38.6°N 75.1°W

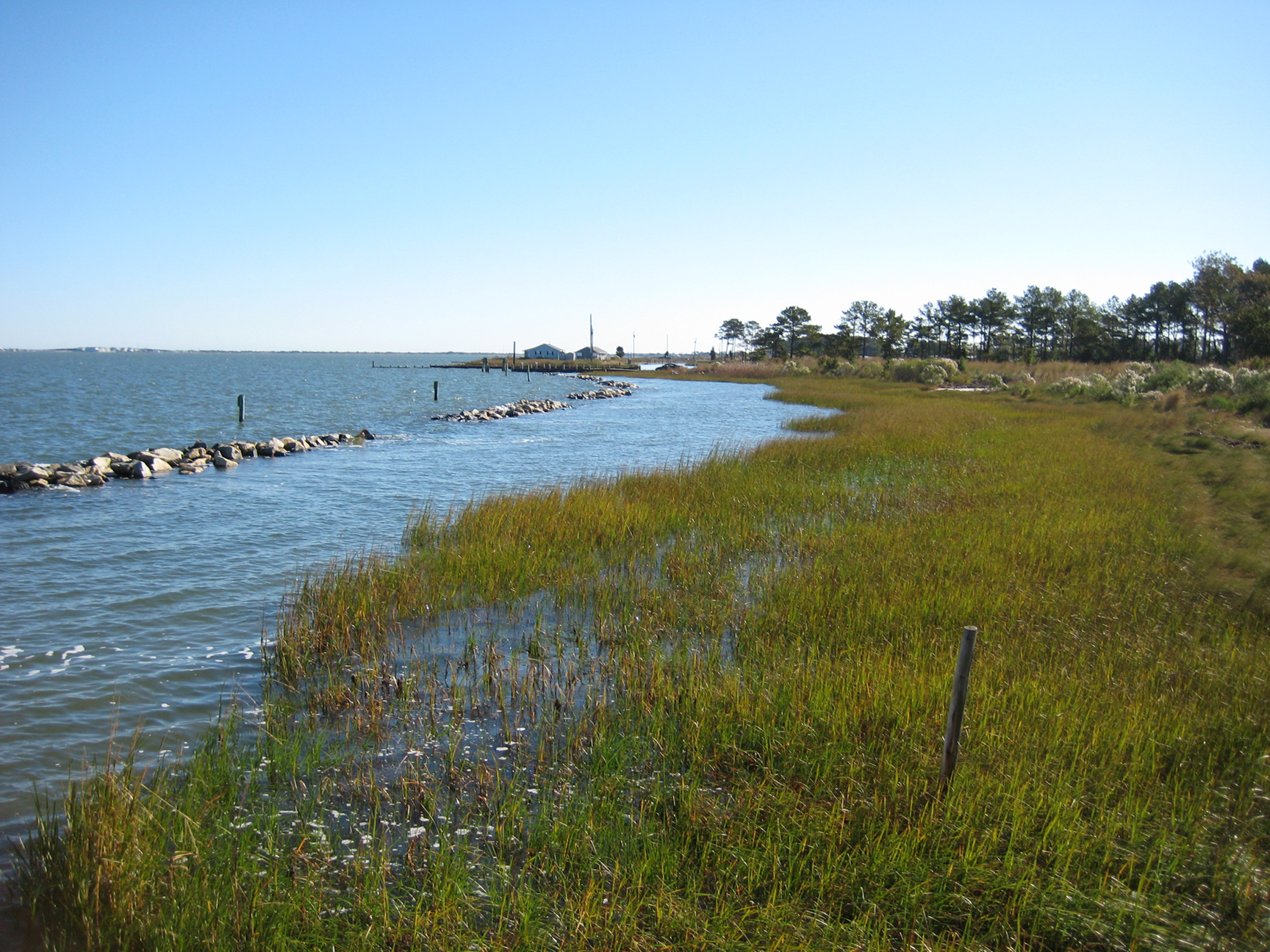
Shoreline of Indian River Bay at Holts Landing State Park

Indian River Bay is a body of water in Sussex County, Delaware. It is part of Delaware's inland bay system, along with Little Assawoman Bay and Rehoboth Bay. Fed by the Indian River at its western end, the bay is connected to the Atlantic Ocean to the east via the Indian River Inlet. A natural waterway that shifted up and down a two-mile (3.2 km) stretch of the coast until 1928, the inlet was kept in its current location by dredging between 1928 and 1937, and in 1938 was fixed in place by the construction of jetties. The Charles W. Cullen Bridge, commonly known as the Indian River Inlet Bridge, spans the inlet.

Indian River Bay is unique among Delaware's inland bays in that it is a drowned river valley, whereas Delaware's other bays are estuaries built on sand bars.

== Recreation ==
Boating, fishing, shellfishing, and crabbing are among the most common recreational uses of Indian River Bay. In addition, the bay is bordered by several protected environmental areas, including Delaware Seashore State Park, Holts Landing State Park, and the Assawoman Wildlife Area.

== Pollution ==
Most pollution of the Indian River Bay is due to agricultural and urban runoff. Two solutions have been proposed. The first requires cutting an inlet through Delaware Seashore State Park, which would involve building a bridge and jetty. The other is dredging and widening the Assawoman Canal to improve the flow of tidal water to and from Indian River Bay and the Indian River Inlet.
