= Little Assawoman Bay =

Body of water in Sussex County, Delaware

Coordinates: 38°28′30″N 75°04′00″W

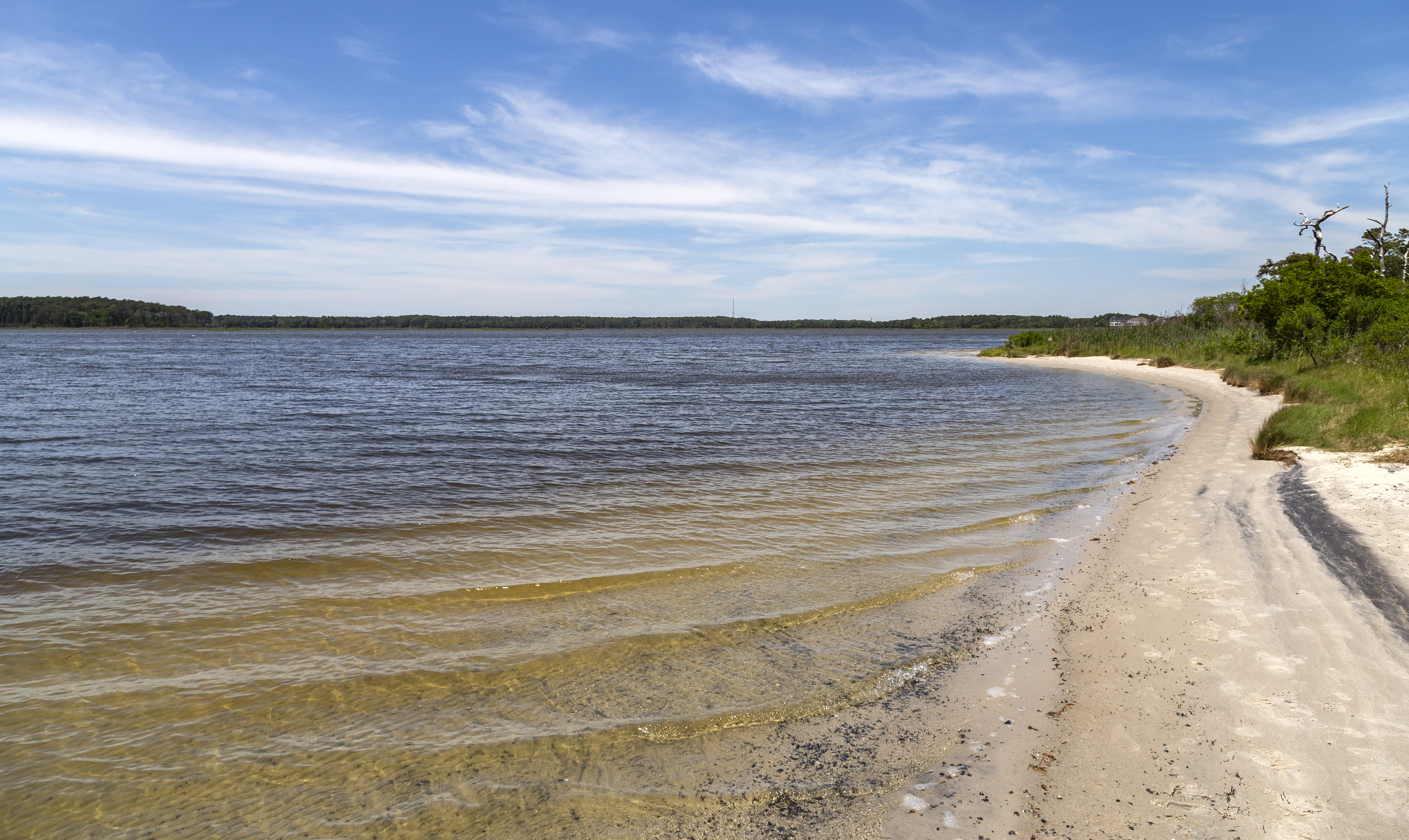
Little Assawoman Bay

Little Assawoman Bay is a body of water in Sussex County, Delaware. It is connected from Assawoman Bay to the south by a narrow canal known locally as "The Ditch," and is connected to Indian River Bay to the north by the Assawoman Canal. It is separated from the Atlantic Ocean by the Fenwick Island barrier spit.
