= Alapocas Run State Park =

State park in Delaware, United States

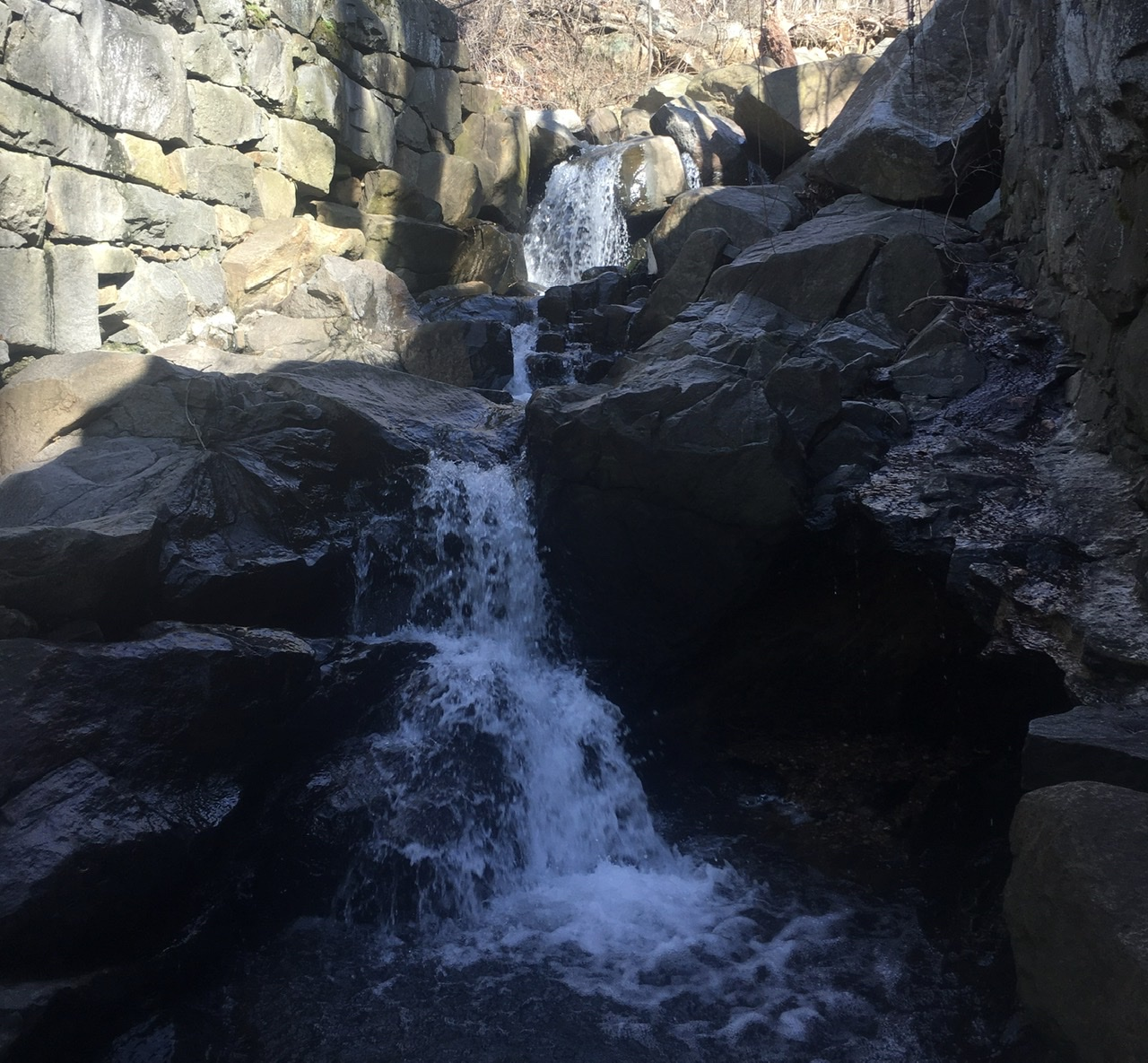
- Alapocas Falls

- Location within Delaware Location within the United States
- Location: New Castle County, Delaware, United States
- Coordinates: 39°46′07″N 75°33′32″W
- Area: 359 acres (145 ha)
- Elevation: 49 feet (15 m)
- Established: Alapocas Woods - 1910; state park - 2002
- Administrator: Delaware Department of Natural Resources and Environmental Control
- Website: Official website

Alapocas Run State Park is a 359-acre (145 ha) public recreation area located in Wilmington, Delaware, United States, along Brandywine Creek and its Alapocas Run tributary. Much of the state park was created from land originally preserved by William Poole Bancroft in the early 1900s to be used as open space parkland by the city of Wilmington as it expanded. The park also includes the Blue Ball Barn, a dairy barn built by Alfred I. du Pont as part of his Nemours estate in 1914. In addition to walking trails, athletic fields, and playgrounds for children, one of the park's primary features is a rock climbing wall. The rock climbing wall is part of an old quarry across from historic Bancroft Mills on the Brandywine, and the quarry is also used for school educational programs centered on earth sciences.

== History ==
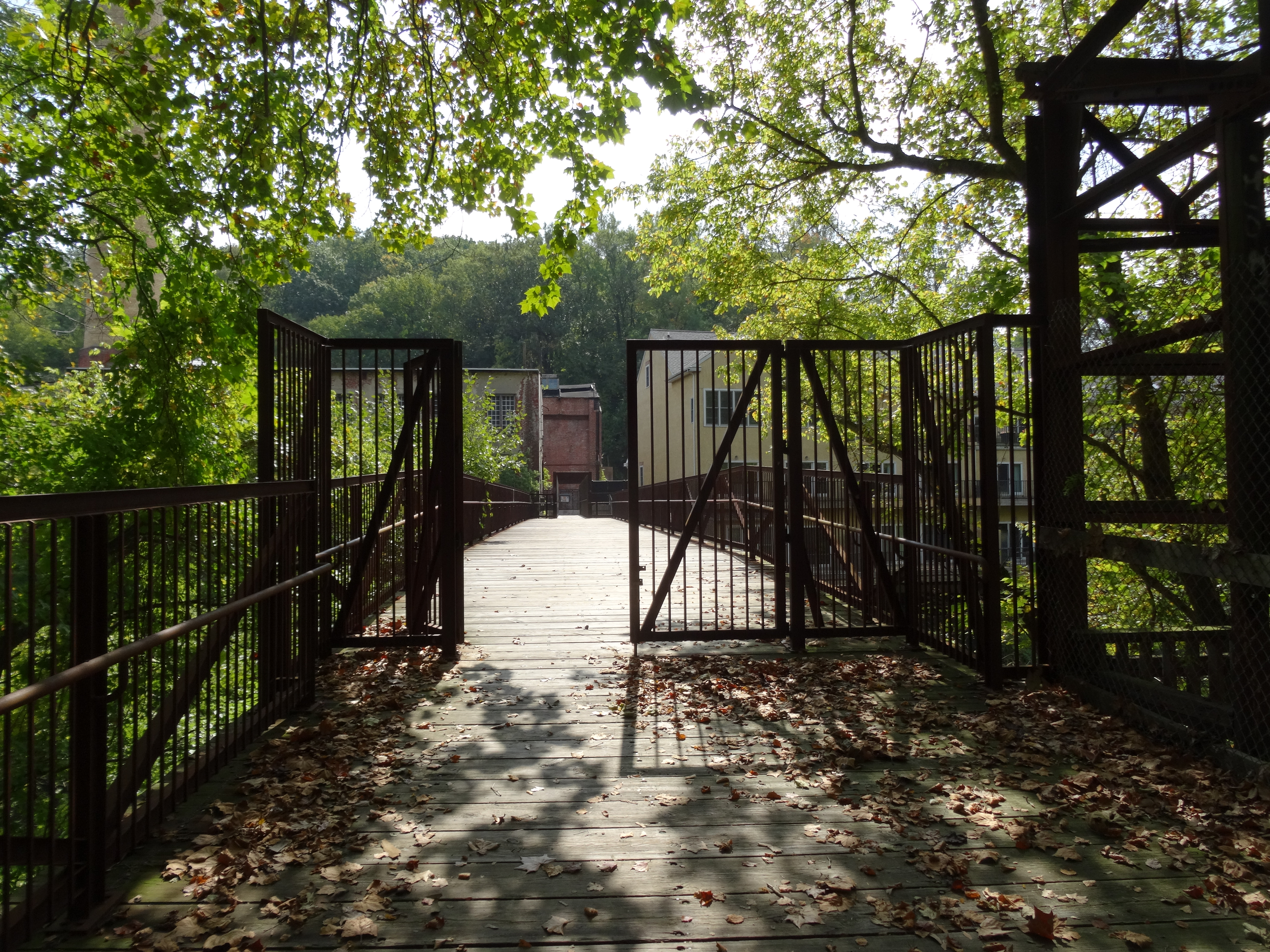
Footbridge to Bancroft Mills

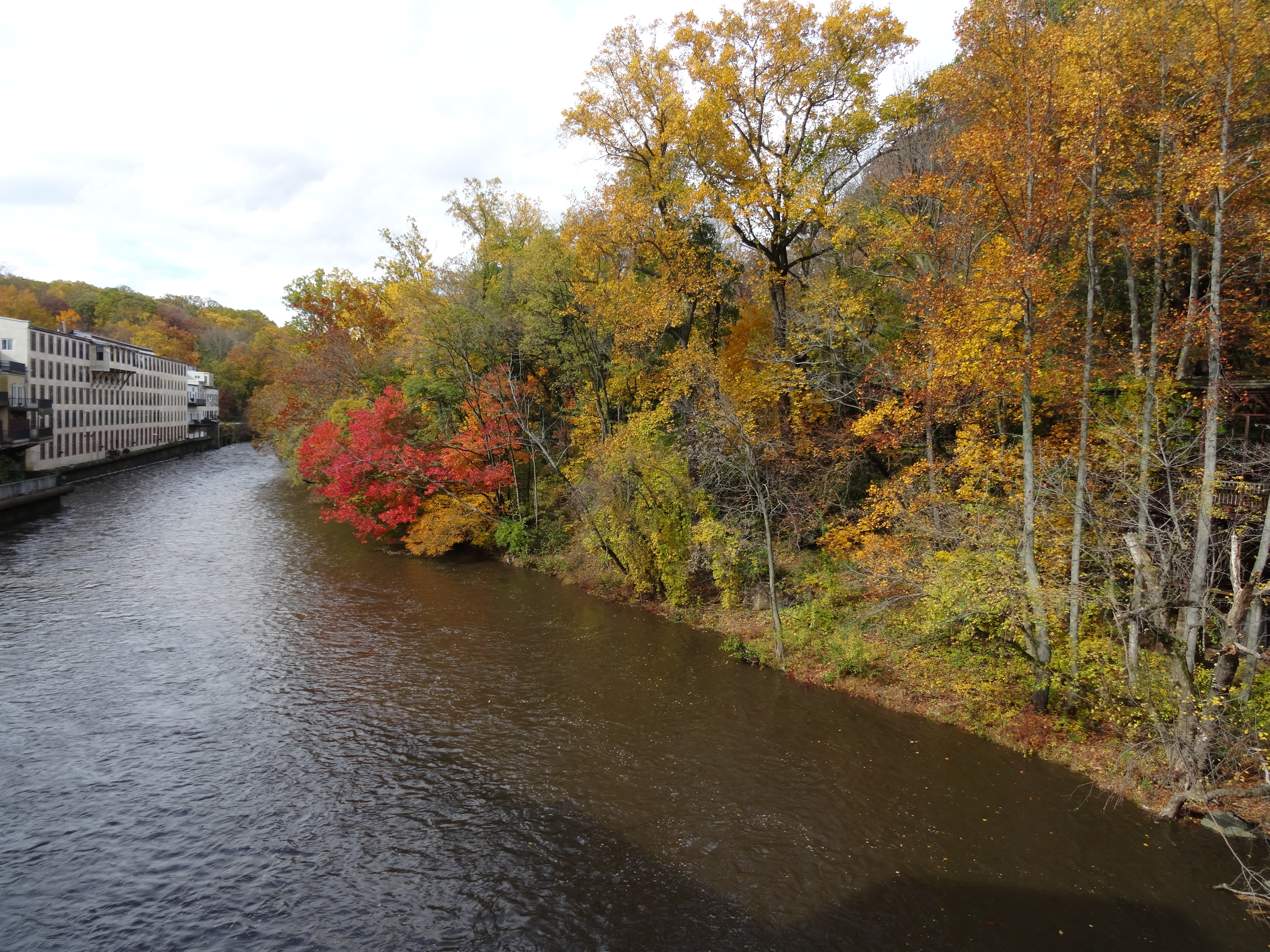
Brandywine River and Alapocas Woods

Alapocas Run was originally created as a 123-acre city park (50 ha) named Alapocas Woods. In 1910 when Alfred I. du Pont was building his Nemours estate from DuPont Company lands, fellow industrialist William Poole Bancroft convinced him to have the company transfer a portion of the land between Nemours and the Brandywine to the city of Wilmington. Bancroft then donated a portion of his own lands along the Brandywine to the city. In addition to being a businessman, Bancroft was also a philanthropist and conservationist and had played a key role, including donating land, in establishing other city parks due to his desire to preserve the scenic beauty of the Brandywine. Directly across the river was the mill complex owned by him and his brother, Samuel. At the time of the creation of Alapocas Woods, he was serving as President of the Wilmington Park Commission. Bancroft and du Pont then jointly paid for the paving of Alapocas Road, which separated the park from the Nemours estate. The park grew to 145 acres (59 ha) over the years, much of which consisted of mature woodland. It also contained the remains of a granite quarry which had operated from 1870 to 1938. Stone from the quarry had been used to create local landmarks such as the Brandywine Park walls, Rockford Park's tower, and the National Harbor of Refuge.

In 1998, Alapocas Run was made part of a state park when it was combined with several other city parks to form Wilmington State Parks.

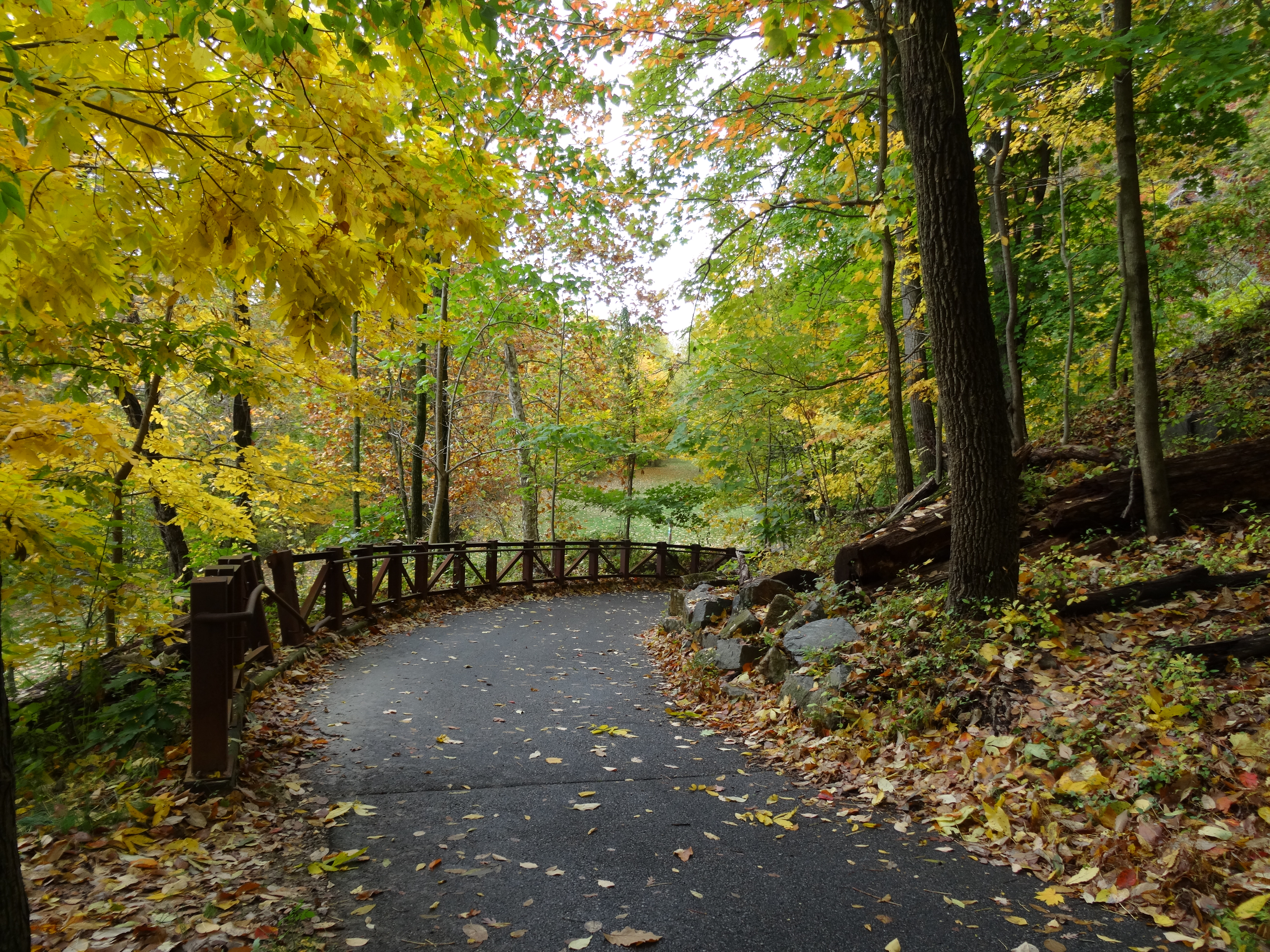
Trail through Alapocas Woods

In 1999, as part of its efforts to convince pharmaceutical company AstraZeneca to relocate its headquarters to the Wilmington suburbs, the state launched the $127 million Blue Ball Project to redo the area's network of roads in addition to creating additional parkland by purchasing open space, developing recreational facilities, and preserving local historic structures. The project included the purchase of roughly 152 acres (62 ha) of land from the nearby Nemours Foundation to be used as open space parkland. At the time of the purchase, the Nemours Foundation also donated a conservation easement on 70 acres (28 ha) of mature woods behind the Nemours Alfred I. duPont Hospital for Children.

The new Alapocas Run State Park was officially dedicated in 2002, with the existing parkland near the Brandywine combined with the additional open space purchased as part of the Blue Ball Project. Development of various park amenities, including the restoration of the historic Blue Ball Barn, was slated to take place over the next three years.

In November 2015, the Nemours Foundation donated 46 acres (19 ha) (of the 70 under conservation easement) for an expansion of the park.

== Facilities ==
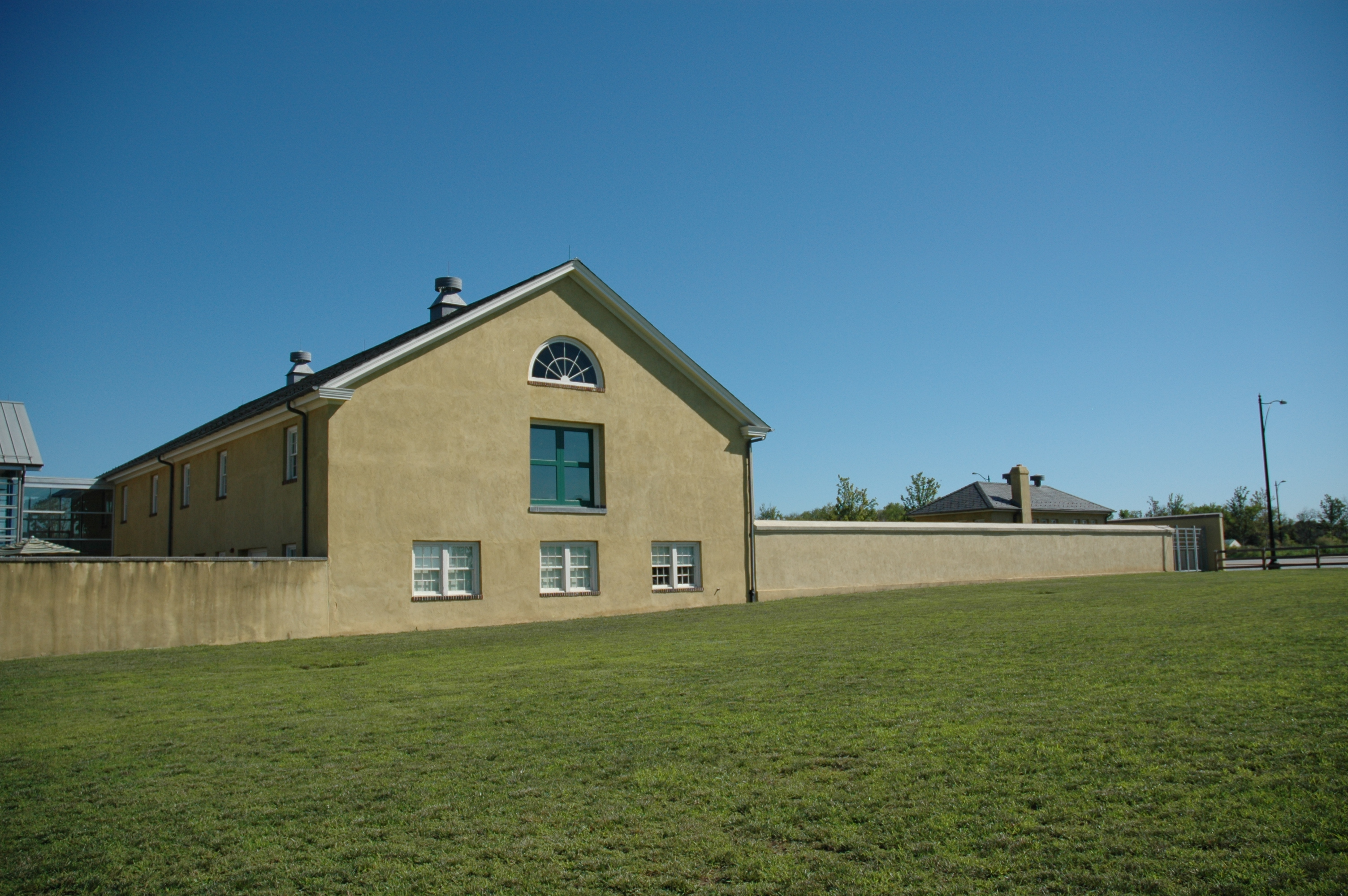
Blue Ball Dairy Barn

The Blue Ball Barn serves as the park visitor center and headquarters. The Delaware Folk Art Collection is on permanent exhibit within the barn, and it houses over 120 works by 50 local artists meant to highlight the state's diverse artistic heritage. The first floor contains exhibits about the area's agricultural history and the development of dairy technology. The barn contains conference and meeting rooms that can be rented out.

The barn was developed into part of the park as part of the state's efforts to reuse historic structures. The building was built in 1914 by Alfred I. du Pont as a state-of-the-art dairy barn. The dairy barn and surrounding farm complex were used to provide food for the Nemours estate from 1914 until 1943. From 1943 through 1977, the barn and farmland was leased out to a family of independent operators who sold the dairy produce externally. After 1977, most of the surrounding farm buildings were demolished. The barn was one of the few remaining structures.

The Blue Ball Barn had been named after a tavern that dated back to the late 18th century which had been located near the barn. In front of the tavern was a pole with a large blue ball that could be raised or lowered. If the ball was on top of the pole, that served as a signal to illiterate stagecoach drivers that there were passengers which needed to be picked up. If the ball was lowered, the stagecoach would pass by.

== Recreation ==
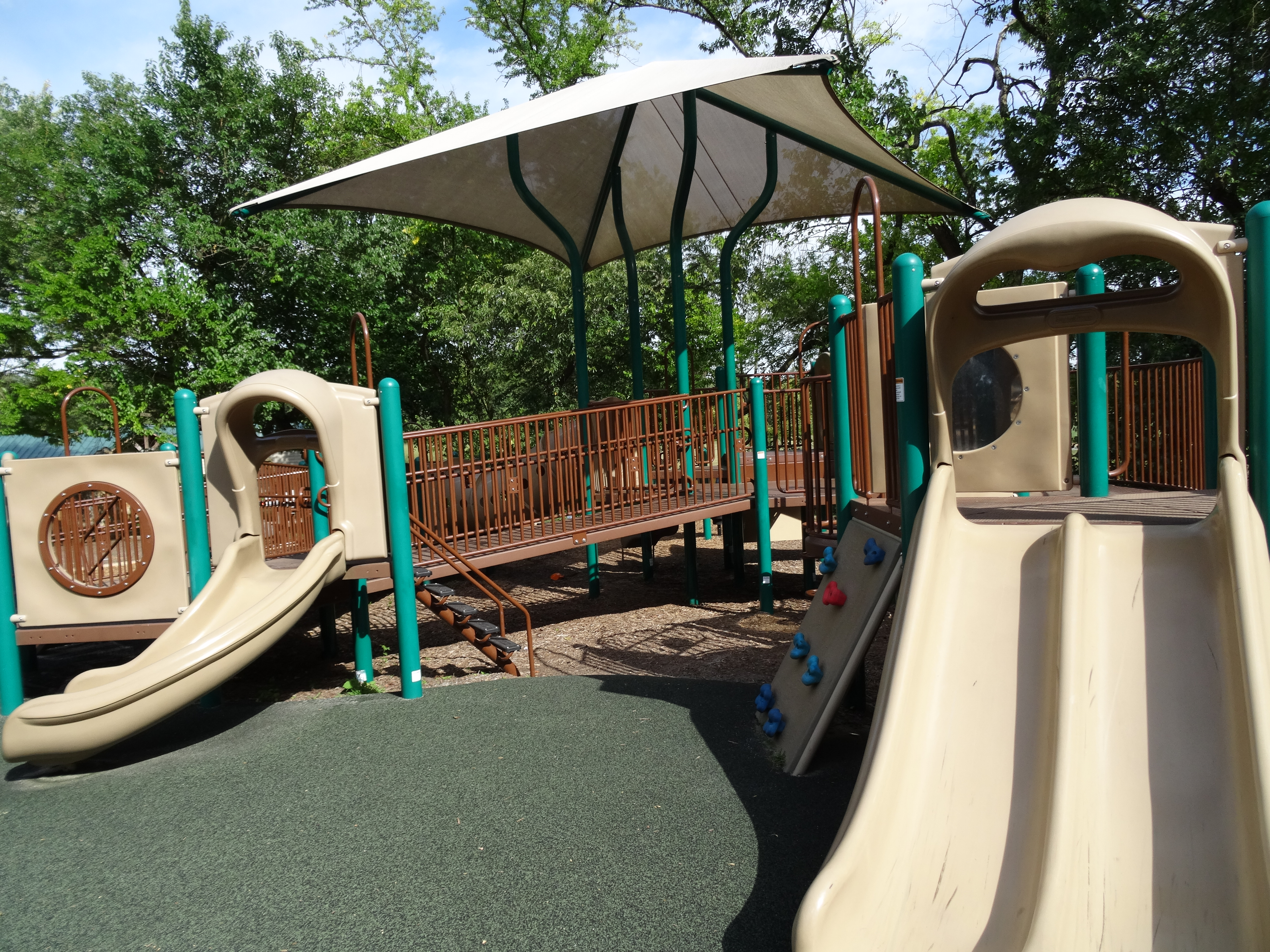
Can-Do Playground

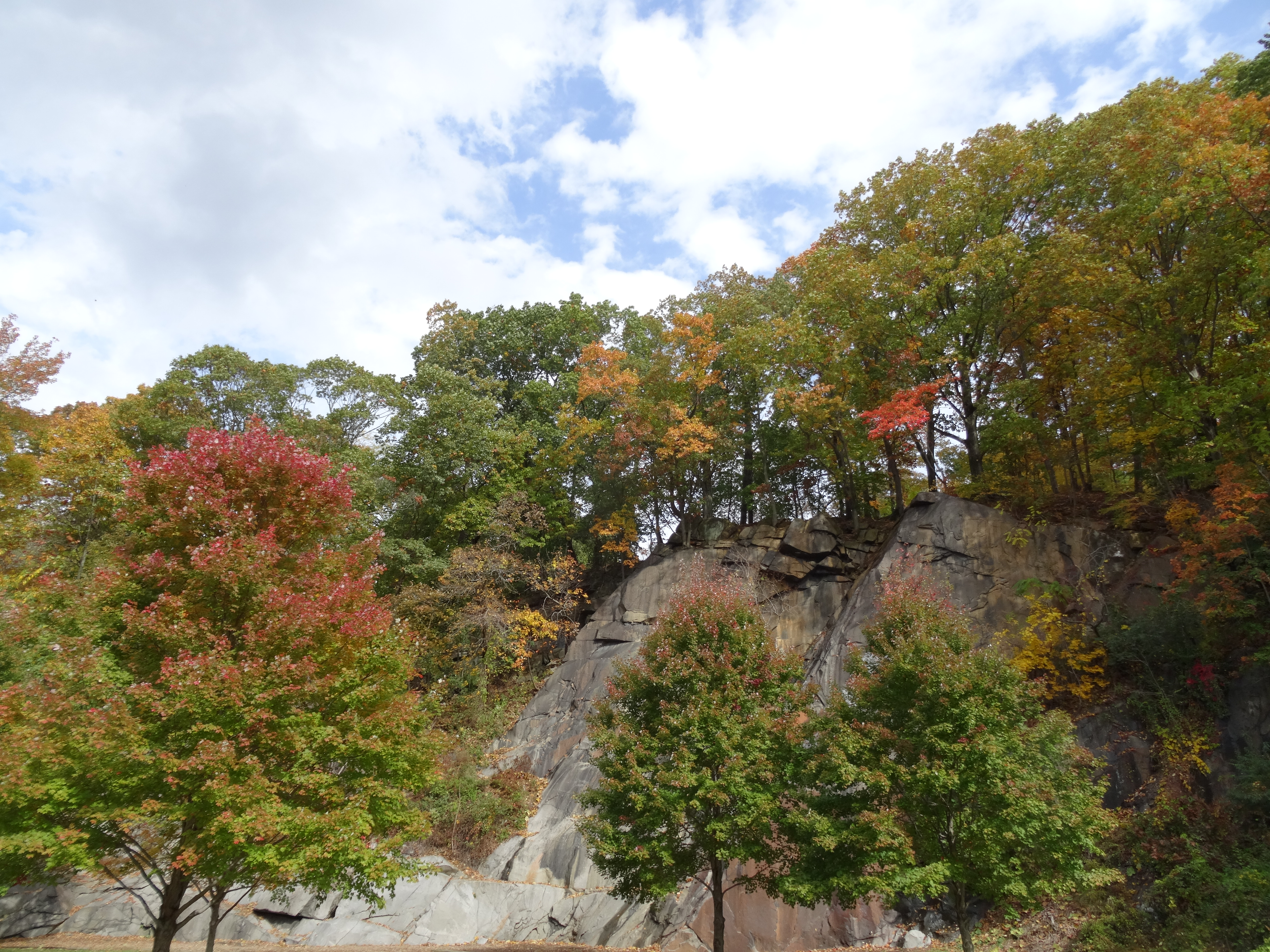
The rock climbing wall

U.S. Route 202 divides roughly a quarter of the park from the rest. This section, referred to as the east park, is primarily reserved for active recreational uses while the bulk of the park to the west of US 202 is designed for passive recreation and preservation of the natural environment.

The eastern section of the park includes three athletic fields which are available for permitted use of team sports such as lacrosse, soccer, field hockey, rugby, and kickball. It includes the 26,000 square foot Can-Do Playground, a boundless playground designed and funded by local Rotary Clubs to be fully accessible to children with disabilities. The playground opened in 2007. Nearby the playground is a pavilion and picnic area with outdoor grills.

The eastern section of the park is also connected through trails and underpasses to the adjacent Rock Manor Golf Course. The public golf course, owned by the city of Wilmington, was first opened in 1921 and was named after the Rock Manor estate where Alfred du Pont stayed while Nemours was being built. The course was closed in 2005 and then extensively redesigned by Lester George as part of the Blue Ball Project. After it reopened in 2008, it was recognized as part of the American Society of Golf Course Architects' Design Excellence Recognition Program.

The western portion has the bulk of the park's hiking and biking trails, including over 2 miles of the Northern Delaware Greenway Trail (part of the East Coast Greenway), a 10.5 mile trail linking Alapocas Run to other northern Delaware sites including Bellevue State Park, Fox Point State Park, Rockwood Museum and Park, and Wilmington State Parks. The .7 mile Alapocas Woods Trail, with the .3 mile PawPaw loop extension, is another trail through the natural areas of the park's western section and is a good place to see the park's mature pawpaw trees. The rock walls remaining from an old granite quarry have been set up to allow rock climbing and rappelling.
