= Brandywine Zoo =

Zoo in Wilmington, Delaware, United States

- Brandywine Zoo Logo
- Interactive map of Brandywine Zoo
- 39.7555°N 75.5487°W
- Date opened: 1905
- Location: 1001 North Park Drive, Brandywine Park, Wilmington, Delaware, United States 19802
- Land area: 4.7 acres (1.9 ha)
- No. of animals: 90
- No. of species: 53
- Annual visitors: 100,000
- Memberships: AZA
- Public transit: DART First State bus: 2, 18, 35
- Website: brandywinezoo.org

Brandywine Zoo is a small 4.7-acre (1.9 ha) zoo that opened in 1905 in Brandywine Park in Wilmington, Delaware, United States. It is located on the banks of the Brandywine River. The zoo is managed by the Delaware Division of Parks and Recreation and supported by the Delaware Zoological Society. It is usually open every day, 10AM – 4PM, weather permitting.

The Brandywine Zoo has been a member of the Association of Zoos and Aquariums (AZA) since 1981.

== History ==
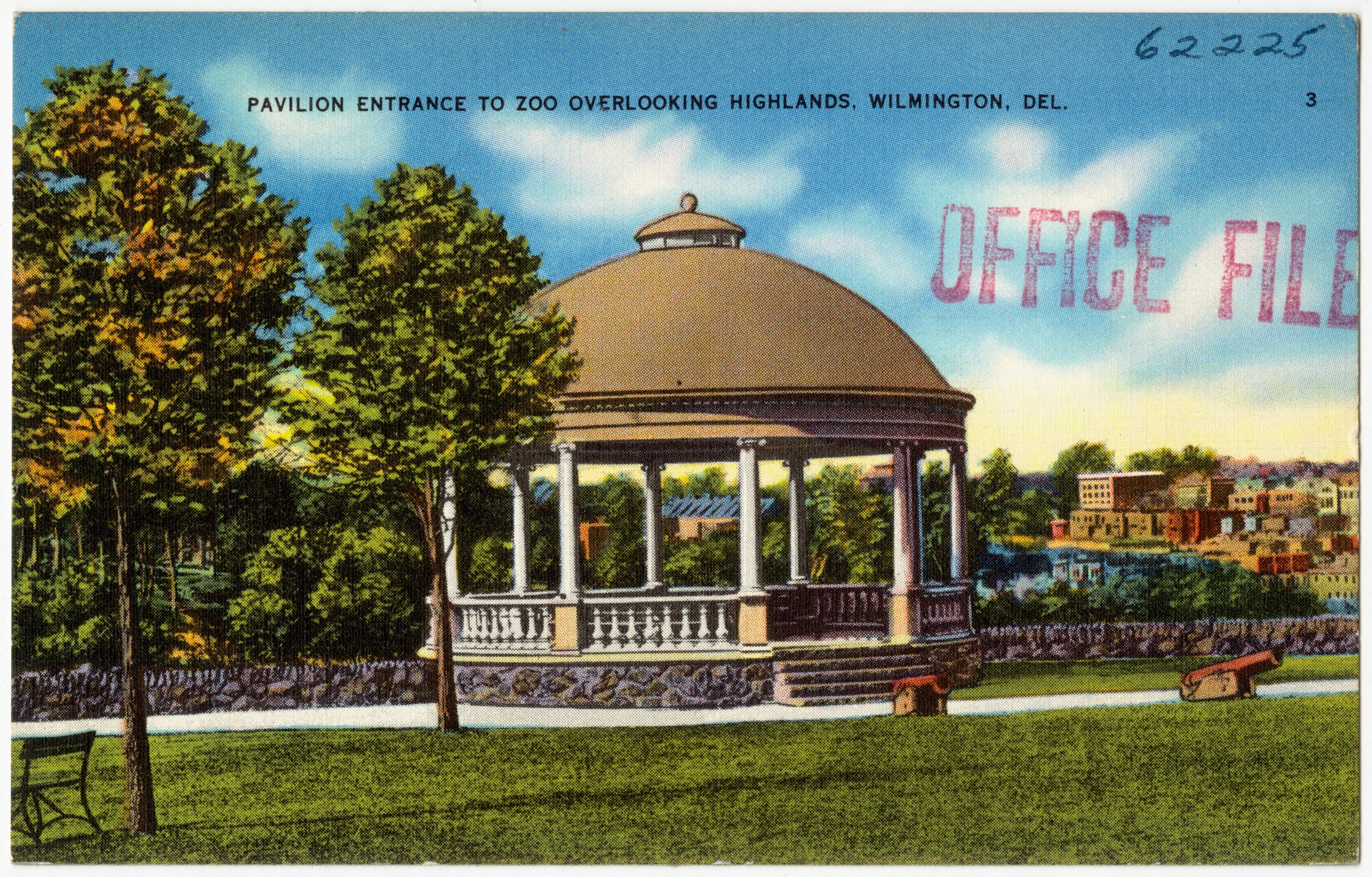
Vintage postcard of pavilion entrance to the zoo, c. 1930-1945

In March 1883, the Delaware State Legislature passed a law forming the Wilmington Board of Park Commissioners. Ten unpaid men were appointed to the board to plan and build Wilmington parks. Eventually their effort yielded Brandywine, Rockford and Canby parks. The commissioners hired Frederick Law Olmsted, the famous landscape architect to find the best places to house these parks. He suggested the city purchase land on both sides of the Brandywine River.

Right across the river from where the current zoo is located lived an Irishman named Archibald Rowan. He made the first printed cloth in Delaware. On the land where the zoo now stands, there was a public amphitheater where people would go to hear famous orators of their time. Among them were Daniel Webster, John C. Calhoun and Henry Clay. It is even said that George Washington mustered his troops on the field above the zoo near the Washington Street Bridge during the American Revolution.

In 1904, Dr. James H. Morgan came to the Board of Park Commissioners with the idea of starting a zoo in Wilmington. He was able to donate some animals if the commission would pay for the shelters and fences. The boundaries of the zoo were very different from today. The main area of the zoo was the area of the old bear pit (across from the current Andean condor exhibit) and the Exotic Animal House, and extended down the river. Ducks and geese, Belgian hares, a sea turtle, and a sea gull were among the original collection. The residential area behind the zoo was considered Washington Heights and its civic association helped to manage the zoo. In 1905, the organization changed its name to the Wilmington Free Zoological Association, and the Wilmington Zoo was born.

Many animals came and went from the zoo family. Between 1921 and 1928, the zoo had donations of eleven elk, three buffalo, two eagles, five monkeys, goats, two black bears, ducks, parrots, two raccoons, one groundhog, and three alligators. In 1928, the old bear pit was filled in and three new bear cages were built. They still stand today in the Main Zoo, next to the Administration Building. During this time, the comfort station (Exotic Animal House) was changed into a monkey house with big wire cages housing mangabees, macaques and squirrel monkeys among others.

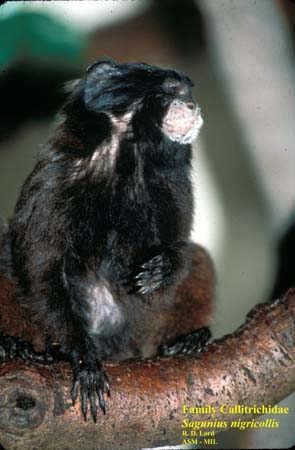
Black-mantled tamarin (Leontocebus nigricollis) at the zoo

The next big change happened in 1950 when the society decided to build a children's zoo. The children's area was to be built on a storybook theme with aquariums, little houses and a bird sanctuary. R.R. Carpenter raised funds by donating the profits from family night at the Philadelphia Phillies professional baseball game. Ground was broken in 1952. The Wilmington Lions Club was also a major fund-raiser on the project. There were eleven little buildings, each centering on a different Mother Goose character. All of the exhibits were brightly painted and housed farm animals donated each spring by area farmers. This area was located up in the far section of the zoo where the capybara and otters are now kept. In the first year of the Children's Zoo there were 46,000 visitors. The themed section survived until the late 1970s in its original fashion.

By 1963, the main zoo had fallen into disrepair and was forced to close while the Children's Zoo remained open. In 1971 New Castle County took over the zoo and hired Hans Rosenberg as zoo supervisor. He added to the zoo's collection but kept the Monkey House closed to the public even though animals were still housed there.

In 1979, Tom Skeldon took Hans Rosenberg's place and developed the Delaware Zoological Society. During this time the Administration Building with offices and a kitchen were built. The tiger exhibit was built where an old duck pond had been. Nancy Falasco became zoo director in 1981. She originally joined the zoo staff in 1978 as zoo curator. She served almost 37 years at the Brandywine Zoo through to her retirement in April 2013.

A new master plan was conceived and put into action. The old Children's Zoo facades were torn down and new exhibits were developed. A North and South American and Temperate Asian theme was adopted. Capital improvements continued with the construction of the river otter exhibit, a new animal hospital, expansion of the tiger exhibit, new entranceway, and new restrooms. Improvements continued to be made.

The Brandywine Zoo marked its 100th anniversary in 2005. Many generations of the regional community celebrated by revisiting the zoo and sharing sentiments of their affection for the animals and the importance of the Brandywine Zoo in their formative years for introducing them to the role that people have in species survival and environmental conservation.

== The zoo today ==
Today, the Brandywine Zoo covers 4.7 acres (1.9 ha) of land along the Brandywine River and features animals from the Americas, temperate and tropical Asia, Africa, Madagascar, and Australasia.

Additionally, the Brandywine Zoo runs with the help of numerous volunteers and docents. In any given year, the zoo has about 50 to 70 community volunteers serving in the education department, animal care, maintenance, as general guides, assisting in research programs, and contributing professional services.

Bald eagles are once again exhibited at the zoo. Two female eagles that were injured in the wild came to the zoo in early 2014. The zoo also exhibited red pandas for the first time beginning in the summer of 2014.

The Brandywine Zoo is part of the Delaware State Parks and is managed by the Delaware Division of Parks and Recreation with the support of the Delaware Zoological Society.

== Delaware Zoological Society ==
The Delaware Zoological Society is the non-profit membership organization that supports the mission of the zoo. Members of the Brandywine Zoo become members of this organization. Contributions support the conservation education programs and overall mission of the zoo. Many local citizens are active volunteers of the Delaware Zoological Society and some serve as the board of directors. The leaders of the organization work closely with zoo management and volunteer time and expertise in service to the zoo.

== Animal history ==
In 2011, the Brandywine Zoo acquired an Amur tiger named Zhanna from the Saint Louis Zoo. Zhanna was transferred to the Bronx Zoo in January 2017 per the AZA's Species Survival Plan.

The zoo has Andean condors, a caracal, North American porcupines, red pandas, a giant anteater, bald eagles, lemurs, neotropical monkeys, and more. Some animals are not on exhibit in the winter.

== Animals ==
This facility is home to a variety of species of mammals, birds and herptiles.

List of animals

The current list of animals include:

- Andean condor
- Bald eagle
- Binturong
- Black-and-white ruffed lemur
- Caracal
- Common raven
- Crowned lemur
- Eastern box turtle
- Giant anteater
- Green iguana
- Green tree python
- Guianan squirrel monkey
- Helmeted guineafowl
- Honeybee
- Mossy prehensile-tailed gecko
- North American porcupine
- Patagonian mara
- Prehensile-tailed porcupine
- Prehensile-tailed skink
- Puna teal
- Red panda
- Radiated tortoise
- Red-footed tortoise
- Ring-tailed lemur
- Sandhill crane
- Scarlet ibis
- White-faced saki
- White-faced whistling duck

== Conservation ==
The Brandywine Zoo participates in a variety of projects to promote conservation both in Delaware and abroad. They founded the Delaware Kestrel Partnership, a project working to research endangered American kestrel populations in Delaware since 2014, that works in conjunction with the American Kestrel Partnership, Delaware Fish and Wildlife, Delaware Nature Society, Delmarva Ornithological Society, Tri-State Bird Rescue & Research, Delaware State Parks, and multiple public and private landowners.

Additionally, the zoo researches wildlife in Delaware through its Urban Wildlife Monitoring Program, a project in partnership with the Lincoln Park Zoo's Urban Wildlife Institute.

The zoo also supports other conservation projects that research and protect wildlife and habitat that including golden lion tamarins, Andean condors, African Vulture SAFE, Paso Pacifico, and local wildlife rehabilitators, among others. In addition, they work closely with other local and state organizations to promote wildfire conservation in the state and region.
