= Wilmington State Parks =

State park in Delaware, United States

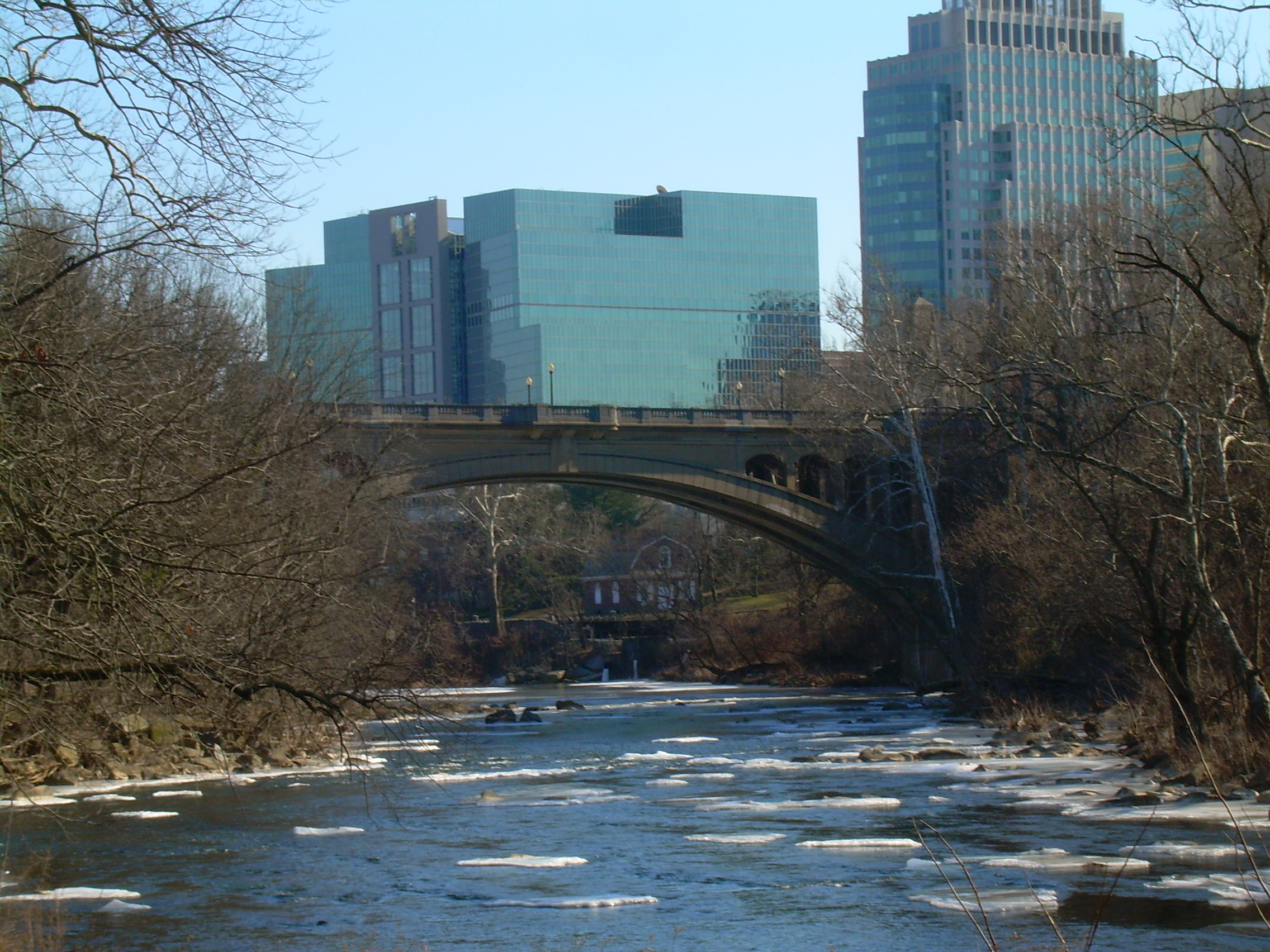
- Brandywine Creek in Brandywine Park near downtown Wilmington looking

- Location within Delaware Location within the United States
- Location: Wilmington, Delaware, United States
- Coordinates: 39°45′18″N 75°33′0″W
- Area: 576.4 acres (233.3 ha)
- Elevation: 100 feet (30 m)
- Established: 1998
- Administrator: Delaware Department of Natural Resources and Environmental Control
- Website: Official website

Wilmington State Parks is a public recreation area located in Wilmington, Delaware, United States. Open year-round, the park covers 576 acres (233 ha) of land mostly situated along the Brandywine Creek. The state park is made up of a group of smaller parks that are administratively managed as a single unit.

Although much of the land comprising Wilmington State Parks is owned by the city of Wilmington, the park is operated and maintained by the Delaware Division of Parks and Recreation, a branch of the state's Department of Natural Resources and Environmental Control. The state park was created in 1998 when the Delaware Division of Parks and Recreation assumed management responsibilities, though the individual parks are much older, with the oldest dating back to 1886.

There are numerous statues, monuments, and memorials in Wilmington State Parks, including war memorials as well as statues and memorials to historically significant Wilmingtonians such as Rear Admiral Samuel Francis Du Pont, U.S. Secretary of State Thomas F. Bayard, conservationist William Poole Bancroft, and shipbuilder William H. Todd. There is also a memorial to President William McKinley and a memorial bridge dedicated to George Washington near a parade ground where the general reviewed his troops during the Revolutionary War.

== Units of Wilmington State Parks ==
Wilmington State Parks consists of four smaller parks. Three of them are along the Brandywine and are connected to one another: Brandywine Park, Rockford Park, and H. Fletcher Brown Park. The fourth, the Hobbs Tract, is located about four miles away in Greenville.

=== Brandywine Park ===
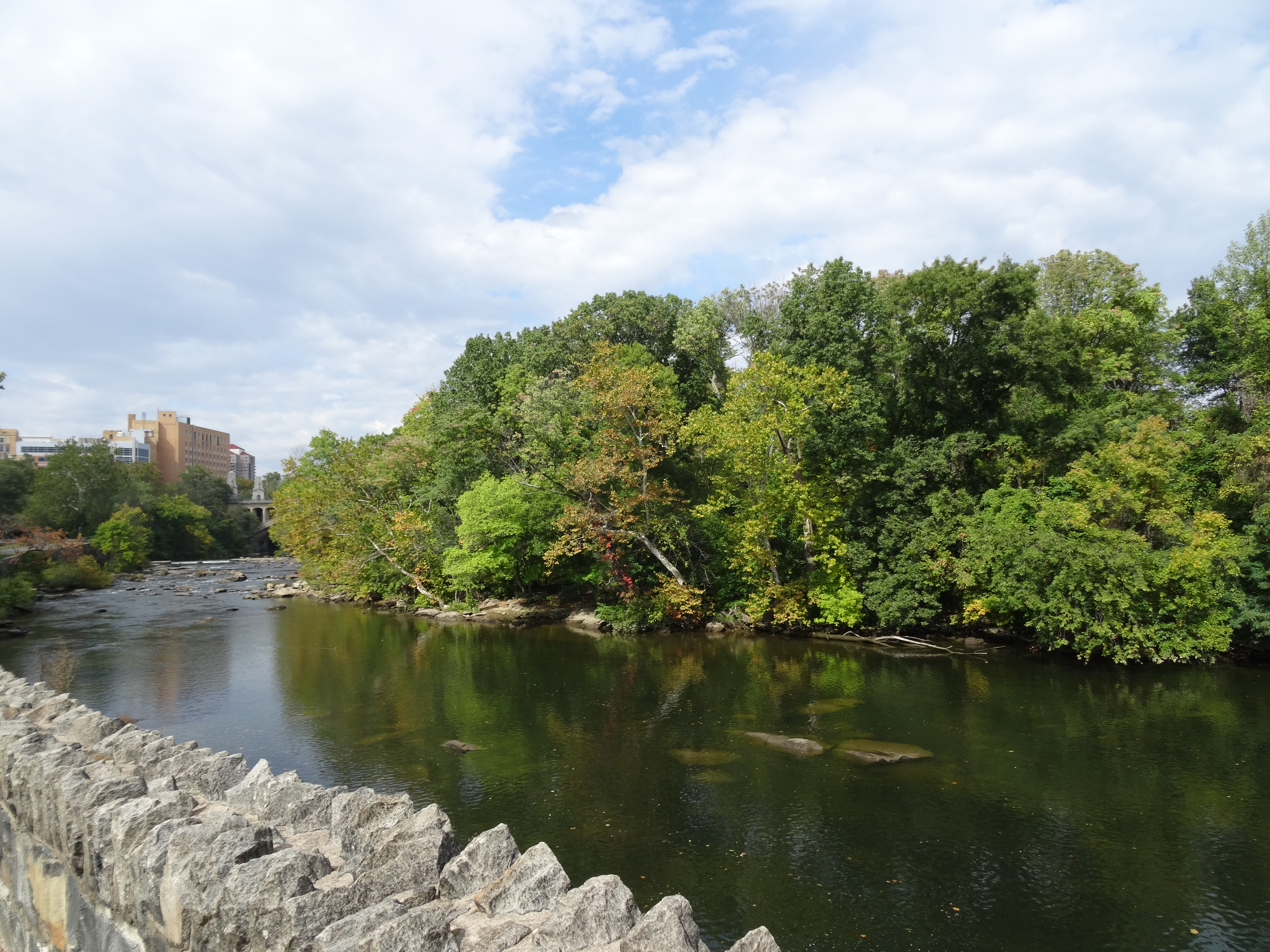
Brandywine Creek at Brandywine Park

Brandywine Park is the oldest of Wilmington's parks, having first been established in 1886 after prominent industrialist and conservationist William Poole Bancroft convinced the Delaware legislature to create a Board of Park Commissioners. The park was designed in consultation with landscape architect Frederick Law Olmsted who, upon viewing the land along the Brandywine Creek, enthusiastically endorsed it as the best location for a park.

The park is approximately 178 acres and it spans both the north and south banks of the Brandywine. Much of the park has been preserved as a mix of wilderness and open space with walking trails and scenic views of the creek and surrounding woods. The open space section of the park includes two formal gardens, a rose garden and a cherry blossom garden. The Brandywine Zoo was created in 1904 and now occupies 12 acres of the park. Brandywine Park also includes active recreational facilities including playgrounds, athletic fields, and Baynard Stadium.

Kentmere Parkway, a half-mile stretch of roadway, was designed by Bancroft and John Charles Olmsted to serve as a greenway to connect Brandywine Park to Rockford Park. The parkway was built in 1891 and features a large, tree-lined median.

=== Rockford Park ===
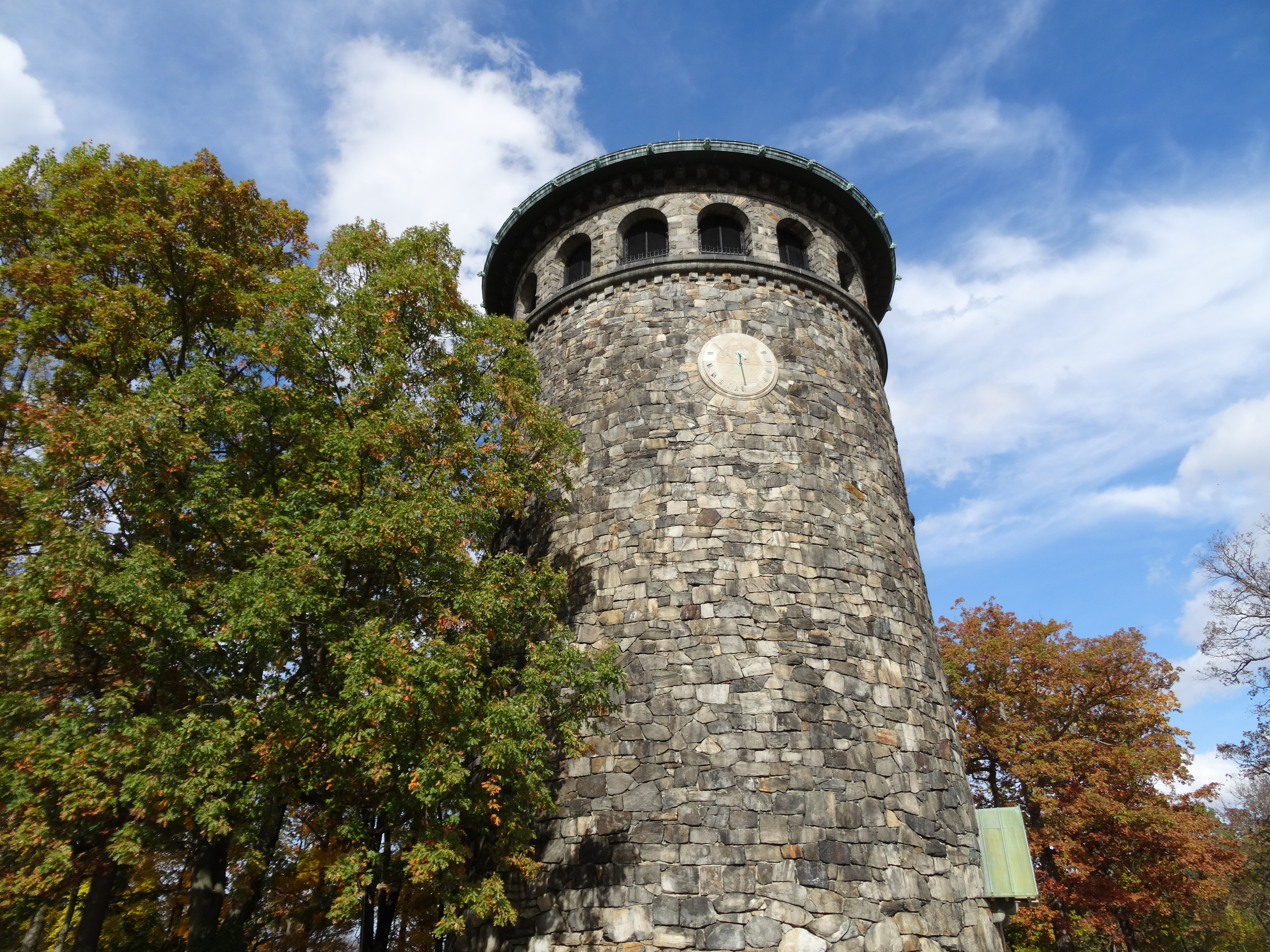
Rockford Tower

The 104 acre Rockford Park was initially established in 1889. The initial 59 acres of land were provided by William Poole Bancroft and his brother, Samuel. Much of the park consists of cultivated lawn that slopes gently upward to a large knoll overlooking the Brandywine.

At the top of the hill is one of Wilmington's most iconic landmarks, Rockford Tower. The 115-foot tall stone structure, which was built between 1899 and 1901, serves as both a water tower and an observation tower as its top floor is an observation deck with large arching windows that provide a 360 degree view of the park and the city of Wilmington. The tower is directly across the river from the DuPont Experimental Station, where the company produced gunpowder in the early 20th century. Initially the city could not allow public access to the tower due to liability concerns over the risk of explosions from the gunpowder mills, but now the tower is open to park visitors in season.

=== H. Fletcher Brown Park ===
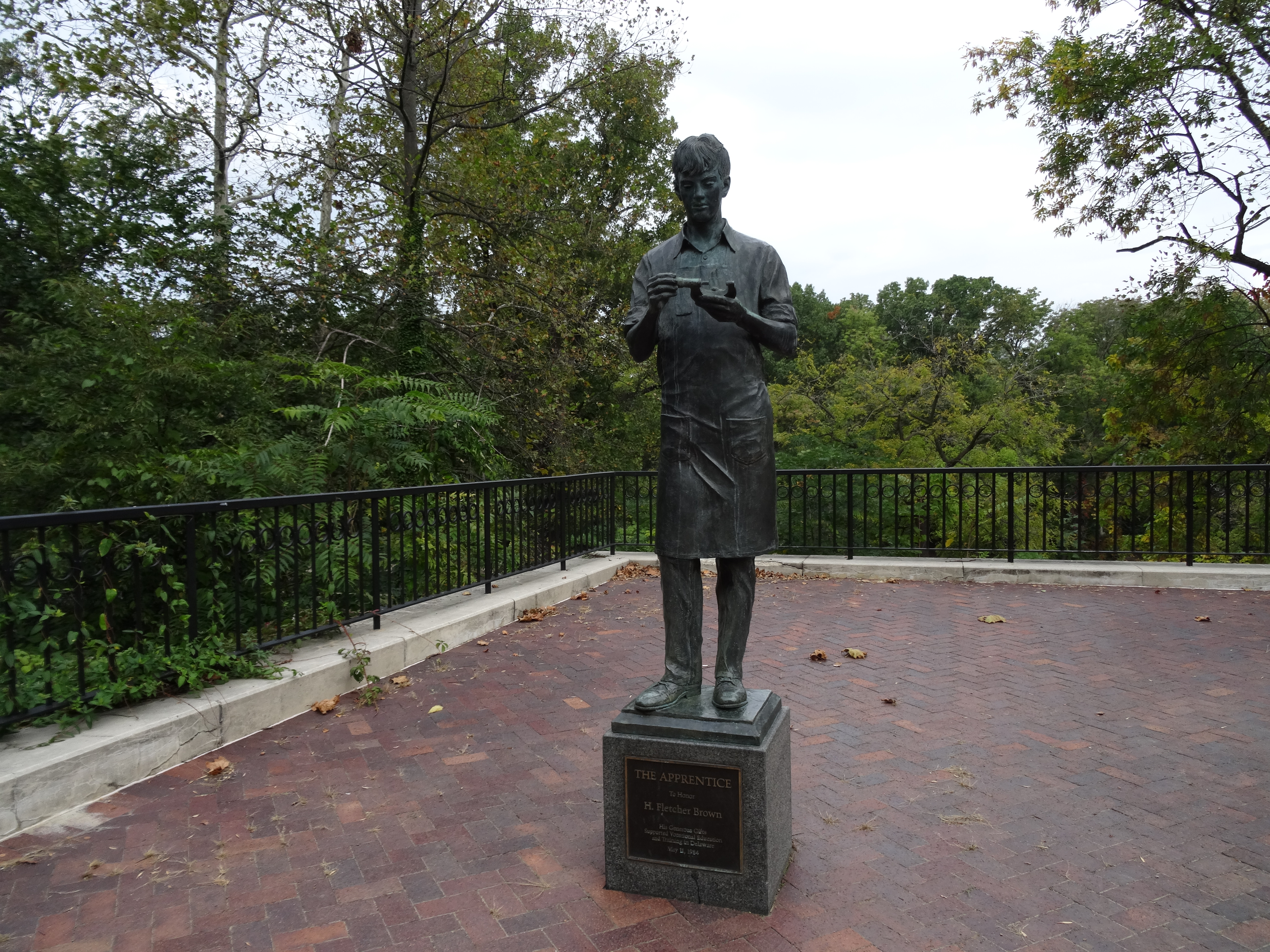
H. Fletcher Brown Statue

H. Fletcher Brown Park is the smallest of the Wilmington State Parks units. It is located slightly downstream from Brandywine Park. The park is on the site of a former vocational high school. The park offers a scenic overlook of the Brandywine Creek and its historic millrace, which once fed local industry along the creek but now supplies Wilmington's drinking water.

The park (and the vocational school which previously occupied the site) is named after Harry Fletcher Brown, a prominent chemist and philanthropist who served as a Vice President of the DuPont Company and developed gunpowder innovations that helped win World War I. There is a statue of Brown in the park created by sculptor Charles Parks.

=== Hobbs Tract ===
The Hobbs Tract is 62 acres of land adjoining Valley Garden Park, the former summer estate of U.S. Senator T. Coleman du Pont, in Greenville. Though the city of Wilmington owns the main section of Valley Garden Park, the expansion land is owned by the state of Delaware, which purchased it in 2004. Previously, it had been part of a Du Pont family farm estate owned by Patricia Hobbs, the great-granddaughter of Eugene du Pont. The estate had served as the location of Twin Lakes Brewing Company and was the childhood home and art studio of painter George Alexis Weymouth, Hobbs' brother. The state also owns a conservation easement on 12 additional acres of the farm.

== Former units of Wilmington State Parks ==
When the park was created in 1998, it originally included the 145 acre Alapocas Woods. The park dated back to 1910, when it was formed by land donations from William Poole Bancroft and Alfred I. du Pont, as the two men saw the opportunity to create a new public park during the planning for du Pont's adjacent Nemours estate. Alapocas Woods was situated along the Brandywine Creek, across from Rockford Park and Bancroft Mills and just north of Brandywine Park.

Beginning in 2002, Alapocas Woods was significantly expanded and was made into a separate state park, Alapocas Run State Park. It is still connected to Wilmington State Parks through the Northern Delaware Greenway Trail, a 10.4 mile trail that runs through Alapocas Run into Brandywine Park.
