= William Poole Bancroft =

American industrialist (1835–1928)

- Born: July 12, 1835; Wilmington, Delaware, United States
- Died: April 20, 1928 (aged 92)
- Occupations: Industrialist, conservationist

William Poole Bancroft (July 12, 1835 – April 20, 1928) was an American industrialist who later became an important figure in the land conservation movement. His belief that the beauty of the Brandywine region should be protected against urban sprawl for future generations led to him purchasing large amounts of land which eventually became state and federally owned park land.

== Early life and career ==
William Poole Bancroft was born on July 12, 1835, in Wilmington, Delaware, United States. His father was Joseph Bancroft, a member of a prominent Quaker family who started his own milling company, Bancroft Mills, in 1831, just a few years before William's birth. His mother was Sarah Poole, the daughter of a Quaker miller and silversmith, William Poole, after whom Bancroft was named. William had a younger brother, Samuel, who was born in 1840.

Both of his parents were Quakers, and his father in particular was very religious and active in the Quaker community. William was educated according to Joseph's religious values, and he emphasized the importance of hard work in his children. William began working at the family mills part-time at seven, and progressed to full-time employment in 1849 at 14. The Civil War proved extremely profitable to the company due to increased demand for its products, and in 1865, when Bancroft was 30 years old, his father managed to pay off all of the company's business debts. This allowed Joseph to reorganize the company as Joseph Bancroft & Sons, making William and Samuel full partners.

The partnership increased Bancroft's wealth dramatically, and the mills continued to grow and prosper, soon becoming the largest textile mill in the United States. Joseph died in 1874, leaving his two sons to run the company by themselves. William then married Emma Cooper in 1876.

== Land conservation and parks ==
Working on his family's mill along the Brandywine River, Bancroft began to appreciate the value of the river and the scenic beauty of its surroundings. He also observed with growing concern the growth of the city of Wilmington, imagining a distant future in which it and Philadelphia would eventually meet and leave no more open and green lands for the people to enjoy. With this in mind, he set about using his wealth to purchase as much land as he could in the Brandywine Valley to be preserved for coming generations. He later described this passion, saying "For many years, I had been saying that I wished someone would gather up the rough land along the Brandywine above Rockland and hold it for the future Wilmington, a Wilmington of hundreds of thousands of people... and I concluded that perhaps I ought to do something toward what I had been wishing others would do." He also said, "It has been a hobby, or a concern with me, for more than twenty-six years, to endeavor to get park land for the advantage of the people of Wilmington and its vicinity."

From 1883 through 1884, Bancroft was instrumental in the passage of legislation forming the Wilmington Park Commission. He served as a Commissioner, and later President, on the commission from 1884 until 1922. It was in this role that Bancroft began establishing the first parks in the city, working with his cousin William M. Canby. In 1885, Bancroft hired noted landscape architect Frederick Law Olmsted to consult on the design of a park that Bancroft intended to donate to the city of Wilmington. This became Brandywine Park, part of Delaware's Wilmington State Parks. In 1889, he donated an additional 59 acres of land, and also personally convinced the du Pont family to donate land as well, to form Rockford Park. These donations continued until his death. In total, Bancroft donated 200 acres of land to the city of Wilmington for use as parks.

Starting in 1900, Bancroft also began purchasing large amounts of land outside of the city of Wilmington in the Brandywine Valley, eventually acquiring over 1,300 acres of land. Portions of this land were donated after Bancroft's death to Brandywine Creek State Park. Around 1,100 acres of the remaining land was donated to the federal government and formed the First State National Historical Park, the first unit of the National Park Service in the state of Delaware. The Brandywine Valley National Scenic Byway runs through these lands as well.

Recognizing that the creation of parklands should continue beyond his lifespan, Bancroft in 1901 formed the Woodlawn Trustees to, "for the benefit of the people of Wilmington and its vicinity", "acquire [land] without limitation as to amount, by gift, devise, purchase or otherwise." Regarding the creation of Woodlawn, Bancroft stated, "Of course I cannot live to see much of this. It may take a hundred years to work out. Perhaps I may be able to so arrange things that it will work out, even if it should be very far in the future."

== Housing and philanthropy ==
In 1898, Bancroft heard about fellow Quaker George Cadbury's Bournville, an attempt to reject the company town model and instead create a more pleasant and affordable planned community. Bancroft traveled to England to meet Cadbury and tour the community, and he returned to America determined to create something similar. The effort was an early precursor to the Garden City movement. Bancroft had 350 rental properties built in Wilmington, each with a private garden and access to parklands. The rents were kept low so that the homes would be affordable by lower income working families for whom Bancroft wished to improve the overall quality of life. In addition to acquiring land for future park development, the Woodlawn Trust was directed to carefully manage its land ownership for the benefit of the people so that affordable housing with open spaces could be maintained into the future.

In 1894, Bancroft established a library in Wilmington and set up and endowment that would fund it as long as it remained free and open to the public. Bancroft also directed considerable philanthropy to Quaker education institutions such as Swarthmore College and the George School.

== Death and legacy ==
Bancroft died on April 23, 1928. He was 93 years old at the time. Much of the land he purchased has been preserved as parkland for future generations, as he intended. President Barack Obama cited Bancroft's "prescient planning" as historically significant when he declared the creation of the First State National Monument.

After his death, George School named one of its buildings Bancroft Hall in his honor. There is a portrait of Bancroft made by the English painter Percy Bigland in 1906 at the Hagley Museum in Delaware. The state of Delaware erected a memorial to Bancroft in 1937, located in Rockford Park.
