= Samuel Francis Du Pont =

United States Navy admiral

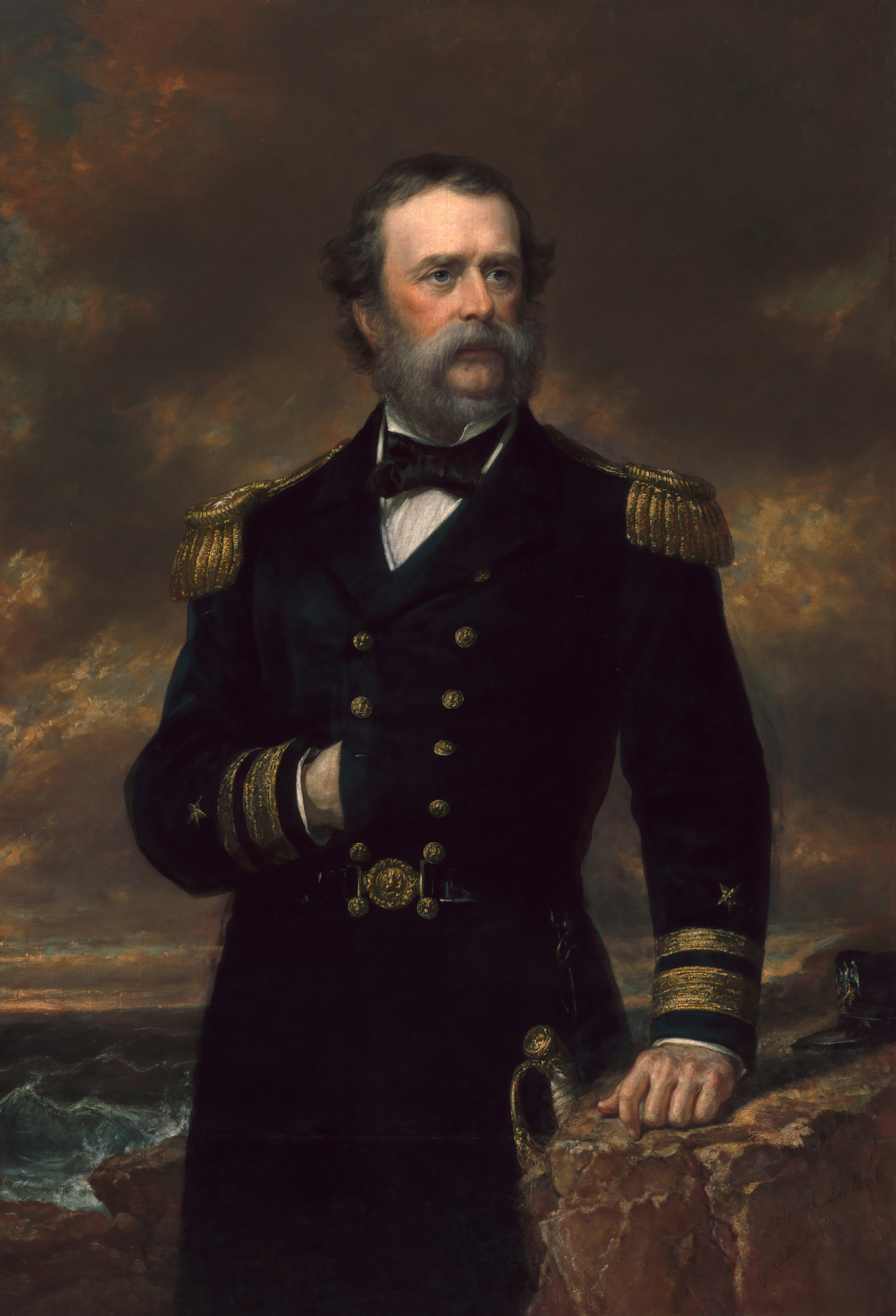
- Samuel Francis Du Pont by Daniel Huntington, 1867–68, oil on canvas, National Portrait Gallery, Washington, D.C.
- Born: September 27, 1803; Bayonne, New Jersey, U.S.
- Died: June 23, 1865 (aged 61); Philadelphia, Pennsylvania, U.S.
- Burial place: Greenville, Delaware
- Relatives: Du Pont family
- Military career
- Allegiance: United States of America
- Branch: United States Navy; Union Navy
- Service years: 1815–1865
- Rank: Rear admiral
- Commands: Warren; Grampus; Perry; Congress; Cyane; Minnesota; South Atlantic Blockading Squadron
- Conflicts: Mexican–American War; American Civil War

Samuel Francis Du Pont (September 27, 1803 – June 23, 1865) was a rear admiral in the United States Navy, and a member of the prominent du Pont family. In the Mexican–American War, Du Pont captured San Diego, and was made commander of the California naval blockade. Through the 1850s, he promoted engineering studies at the United States Naval Academy, to enable more mobile and aggressive operations. In the American Civil War, he played a major role in making the Union blockade effective, but was controversially blamed for the failed attack on Charleston, South Carolina in April 1863.

== Early life and naval career ==
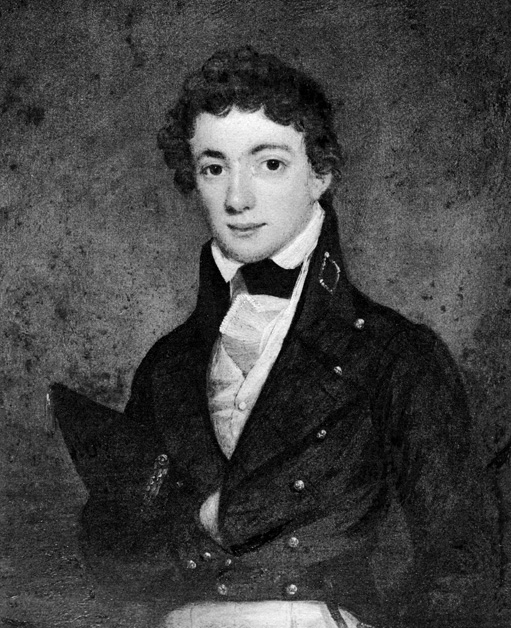
Painting of Du Pont as a midshipman

Du Pont was born at Goodstay, his family home at Bergen Point (now Bayonne), New Jersey, the fourth child and second son of Victor Marie du Pont and Gabrielle Joséphine de la Fite de Pelleport. His uncle was Eleuthère Irénée du Pont, the founder of E.I. du Pont de Nemours Company, which began as a gunpowder factory and today is a multinational chemical corporation. (Samuel was the only member of his generation to use a capital D.) Du Pont spent his childhood at his father's home, Louviers, across the Brandywine Creek from his uncle's estate and gunpowder factory, Eleutherian Mills, just north of Wilmington, Delaware. He was enrolled at Mount Airy Academy in Germantown, Pennsylvania, at age 9. However, his father was unable to fund his education because of his failing wool mill, and he was encouraged to instead enlist in the U.S. Navy. His family's close connections with President Thomas Jefferson helped secure him an appointment as a midshipman by President James Madison at the age of 12, and he first set sail aboard the 74-gun ship of the line Franklin out of Delaware in December 1815.

As there was no naval academy at the time, Du Pont learned mathematics and navigation at sea and became an accomplished navigator by the time he took his next assignment aboard the frigate Constitution in 1821. He then served aboard the frigate Congress in the West Indies and off the coast of Brazil. Though still not yet a commissioned officer, he was promoted to sailing master during his service aboard the 74-gun North Carolina in 1825, which sailed on a mission to display American influence and power in the Mediterranean. Soon after his promotion to Lieutenant in 1826, he was ordered aboard the 12-gun schooner Porpoise, returned home for two years after his father's death in 1827, and then served aboard the 16-gun sloop Ontario in 1829. Despite the short period in which he had been an officer by this time, Du Pont had begun to openly criticize many of his senior officers, who he believed were incompetent and had only received their commands through political influence.

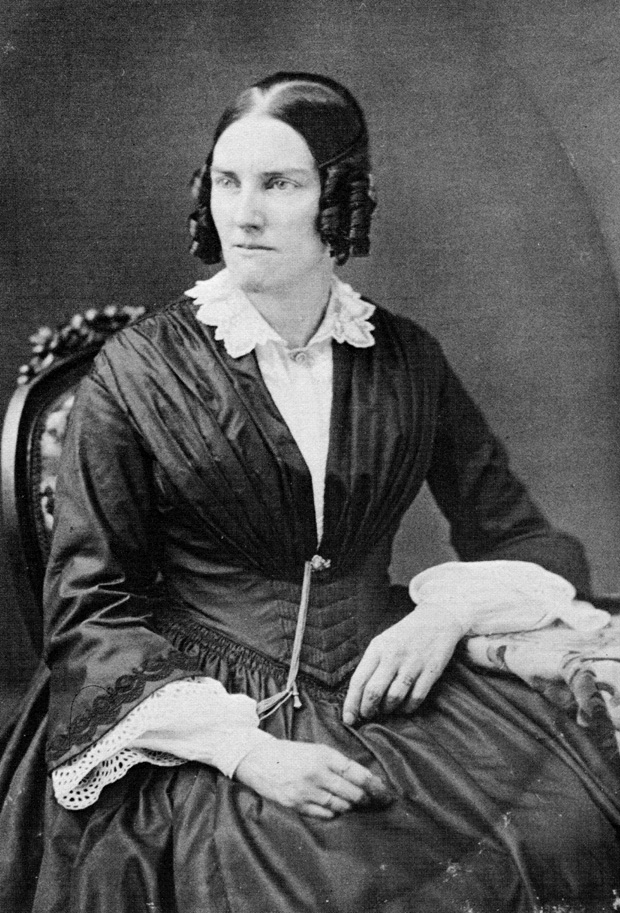
Sophie Madeleine du Pont, in a photograph by Mathew Brady

After returning from the Ontario in June 1833, Du Pont married Sophie Madeleine du Pont (1810–88), his first cousin as the daughter of his uncle, Eleuthère Irénée du Pont. As he never kept an officer's journal, his voluminous correspondence with Sophie serves as the main documentation of his operations and observations throughout the rest of his naval career. From 1835 until 1838, he was the executive officer of the frigate Constellation and the sloop Warren, commanding both the latter and the schooner Grampus in the Gulf of Mexico. In 1838 he joined the ship Ohio in the Mediterranean until 1841. The following year he was promoted to commander and set sail for China aboard the brig Perry, but was forced to return home and give up his command because of severe illness. He returned to service in 1845 as commander of the Congress, the flagship of Commodore Robert Stockton, reaching California by way of a cruise of the Hawaiian Islands by the time the Mexican–American War had begun.

== Mexican–American War ==
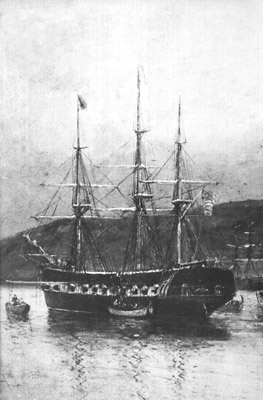
USS Cyane Taking Possession of San Diego Old Town July 1846, by Carlton T. Chapman (detail)

Du Pont was given command of the sloop Cyane in 1846 and quickly showed his skill as a naval combat commander, taking or destroying thirty enemy ships and clearing the Gulf of California in the process. Du Pont transported Major John Fremont's troops to San Diego, where they captured the city. Du Pont then continued operations along the Baja coast, including the capture of La Paz, and burnt two enemy gunboats in the harbor of Guaymas under heavy fire. He led the main line of ships that took Mazatlán on November 11, 1847, and on February 15, 1848, launched an amphibious assault on San José del Cabo that managed to strike three miles (5 km) inland and relieve a besieged squadron, despite heavy resistance. He was given command of the California naval blockade in the last months of the war and, after taking part in further land maneuvers, was ordered home.

== Between wars ==
Du Pont served most of the next decade on shore assignment, and his efforts during this time are credited with helping to modernize the U.S. Navy. He studied the possibilities of steam power, and emphasized engineering and mathematics in the curriculum that he established for the new United States Naval Academy. He was appointed superintendent of the Academy, but resigned after four months because he believed it was a post more appropriate for someone closer to retirement age. He was an advocate for a more mobile and offensive Navy, rather than the harbor defense function that much of it was then relegated to, and worked on revising naval rules and regulations. After being appointed to the board of the United States Lighthouse Service, his recommendations for upgrading the antiquated system were largely adopted by Congress in a lighthouse bill.

In 1853, Du Pont was made general superintendent over what is typically considered the first World's Fair in the United States—the Exhibition of the Industry of All Nations, held in New York City. Despite international praise, low attendance caused the venture to go into heavy debt, and Du Pont resigned.

Du Pont became an enthusiastic supporter of naval reform, writing in support of the 1855 congressional act to "Promote the Efficiency of the Navy." He was appointed to the Naval Efficiency Board and oversaw the removal of 201 naval officers. When those under fire called upon friends in Congress, Du Pont himself became the subject of heavy criticism, and subsequent review of the dismissals resulted in the reinstatement of nearly half of those removed.

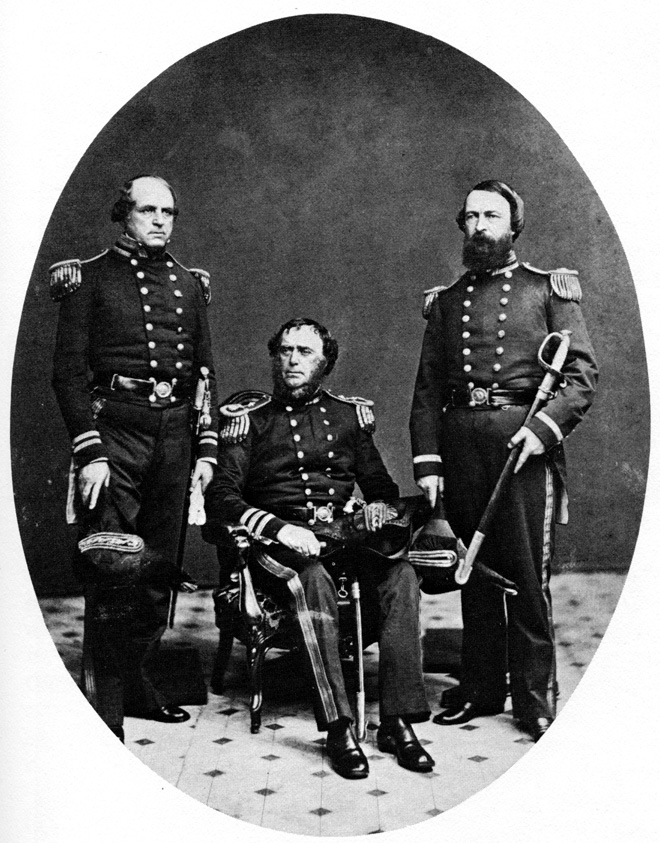
The Official Escorts to the Japanese Embassy, 1860: Du Pont, center, with Sidney Smith Lee and David Dixon Porter

Du Pont was promoted to captain in 1855. In 1857 he was given command of the steam frigate Minnesota and ordered to transport William Reed, the U.S. Minister to China, to his post in Beijing. Du Pont's Minnesota was one of seventeen warships parading Western force in China, and after China failed to satisfy demands for greater access to its ports, he witnessed the capture of Chinese forts on the Peiho River by the French and English on April 28, 1858. He then sailed to Japan, India, and Arabia, finally returning to Boston in May 1859. He played a major role in the receiving of the Japanese ambassador that year, accompanying him on his three-month visit to Washington, Baltimore, and Philadelphia; the trip was a breakthrough for opening Japan to American trade and investment. Du Pont was then made commandant of the Philadelphia Naval Shipyard in 1860. He expected to retire in this post, but the outbreak of the Civil War returned him to active duty.

He was elected as a member to the American Philosophical Society in 1862.

== Civil War ==
When communication was cut off with Washington at the start of the Civil War, Du Pont took the initiative of sending a fleet to the Chesapeake Bay to protect the landing of Union troops at Annapolis, Maryland. In June 1861 he was made president of a board in Washington formed to develop a plan of naval operations against the Confederacy. He was appointed flag officer serving aboard the steam frigate Wabash as commander of the South Atlantic Blockading Squadron, leading from Norfolk, Virginia, the largest fleet ever commanded by an American officer at that time. On November 7, Du Pont led a successful attack on the fortifications at Port Royal harbor in South Carolina. This victory enabled Union naval forces to secure the southern waters of Georgia and the entire eastern coast of Florida, and an effective blockade was established. On January 3, 1862, he was promoted to the newly created rank of Flag Officer (equivalent to the rank of Commodore, which would be created in July 1862). Du Pont received commendations from U.S. Congress for his brilliant tactical success, and was appointed rear admiral on July 16, 1862.

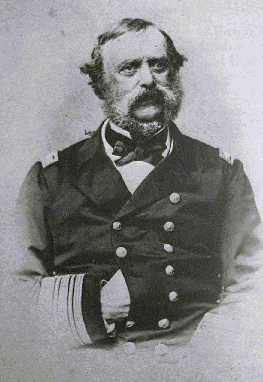
Photograph of Du Pont in 1862 by Frederick Gutekunst

Towards the end of 1862, Du Pont became the first U.S. naval officer to be assigned command over armored "ironclad" ships. Though he commanded them ably in engagements with other ships, they performed poorly in an attack on Fort McAllister, due to their small number of guns and slow rate of fire. Du Pont was then given direct orders from the Navy Department to launch an attack on Charleston, South Carolina which was the site of the first shots fired in the Civil War with the fall of Fort Sumter and the main area in which the Union blockade had been unsuccessful. Though Du Pont believed that Charleston could not be taken without significant land troop support, he nevertheless attacked with nine ironclads on April 7, 1863. Unable to navigate properly in the obstructed channels leading to the harbor, his ships were caught in a blistering crossfire, and he withdrew them before nightfall. Five of his nine ironclads were disabled in the failed attack, and one more subsequently sank.

The Secretary of the Navy, Gideon Welles, blamed Du Pont for the highly publicized failure at Charleston. Du Pont himself anguished over it and, despite an engagement in which vessels under his command defeated and captured a Confederate ironclad, was relieved of command on July 5, 1863, at his own request and was replaced in this Office by Rear Admiral John A. Dahlgren. Though he enlisted the help of Maryland U.S. Representative Henry Winter Davis to get his official report of the incident published by the Navy, an ultimately inconclusive congressional investigation into the failure essentially turned into a trial of whether Du Pont had misused his ships and misled his superiors. Du Pont's attempt to garner the support of President Abraham Lincoln was ignored, and he returned home to Delaware. He returned to Washington to serve briefly on a board reviewing naval promotions.

However, subsequent events arguably vindicated Du Pont's judgment and capabilities. A subsequent U.S. naval attack on the city failed, despite being launched with a significantly larger fleet of armored ships. Charleston was finally taken only by the invasion of General Sherman's army in 1865.

== Death and legacy ==
Coat of Arms of Samuel Francis Du Pont

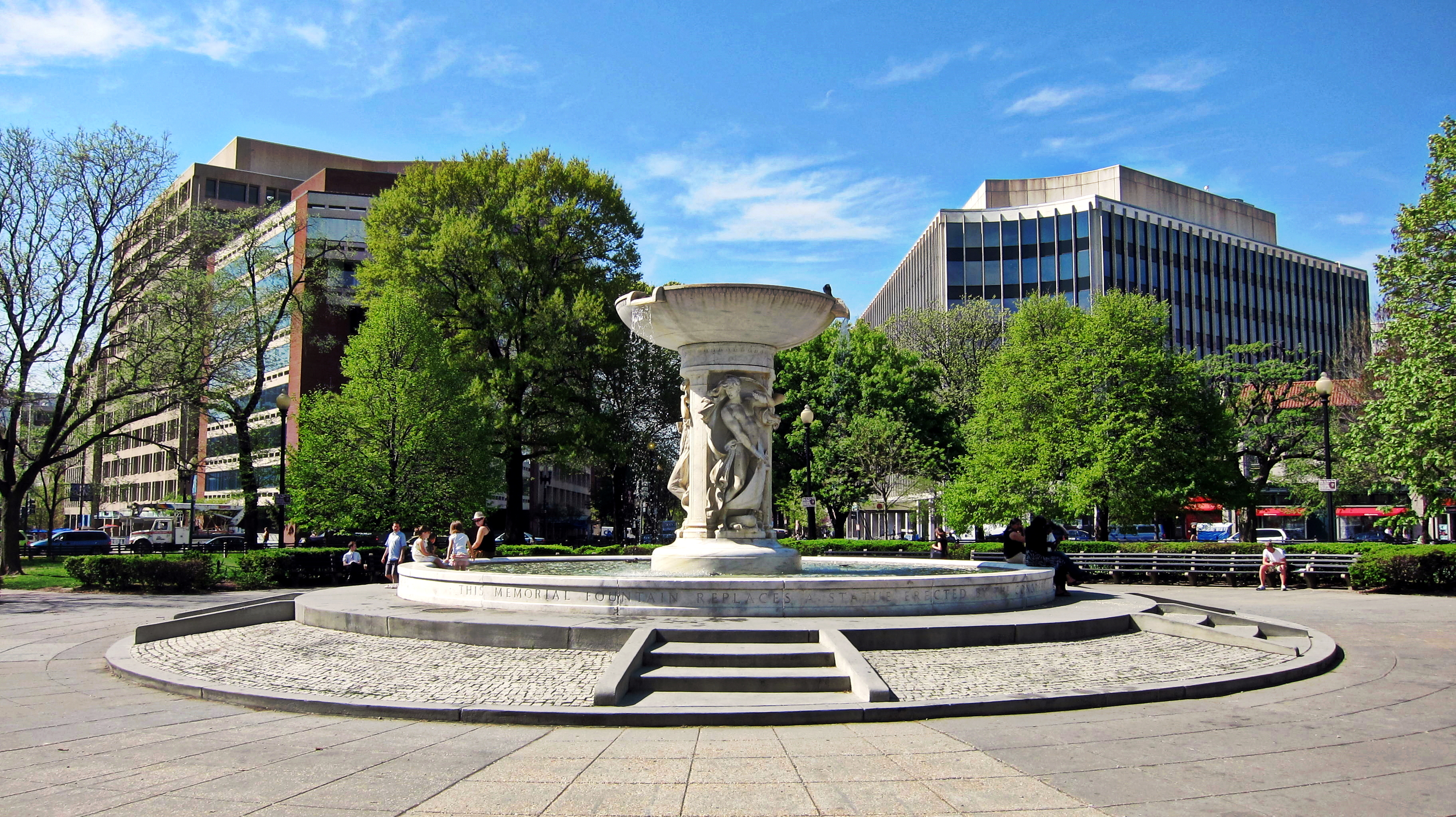
The Dupont Circle Fountain in Dupont Circle, Washington, D.C.

Du Pont died on June 23, 1865, while on a trip to Philadelphia, and is buried in the du Pont family cemetery near the Hagley Museum in Greenville, Delaware.

In 1882, 17 years after Du Pont's death, the U.S. Congress finally moved to recognize his service and commissioned a sculpture of him to be placed in Pacific Circle in Washington. A bronze sculpture of Du Pont by Launt Thompson was dedicated on December 20, 1884, and the traffic circle was renamed Dupont Circle. In attendance were U.S. President Chester A. Arthur and Delaware senator Thomas F. Bayard. Though the circle still bears his name, the statue was moved to Rockford Park (part of Wilmington State Parks) in Wilmington, Delaware, by the du Pont family in 1920, and replaced by a fountain designed by Daniel Chester French, dedicated in 1921.

Louviers was added to the National Register of Historic Places in 1971.

== Dates of rank ==
- Midshipman – December 19, 1815
- Lieutenant – April 26, 1826
- Commander – October 28, 1842
- Captain – September 14, 1855
- Flag Officer – January 3, 1862
- Rear Admiral – July 16, 1862
- Died – June 23, 1865

== Namesakes ==
Fort du Pont near Delaware City, Delaware, and three U.S. Navy ships; the torpedo boat TB-7, and the destroyers DD-152 and DD-941 were all named in honor of Samuel Du Pont. Public School 31 in the Greenpoint neighborhood of New York City, is named after him, as is Dupont Circle in Washington, D.C. Grant Avenue in San Francisco, California, at one time was named Dupont Street following the Mexican–American War of 1846–1848. While it was renamed after President Ulysses S. Grant in 1906, Grant Avenue is still written and said in Chinese as "Dupont Gai" (都板街, Gai 街 means street).

== See also ==
- du Pont family
- Battle of Fort Pulaski, bombardment. USS Wabash crew served four of five Parrott Rifle guns.
