= Lester George =

German architect

Lester George is a golf course architect who was born in Wiesbaden, Germany, in 1955 while his father was stationed there by the United States Air Force.

After attending The University of Richmond, where he founded the school's orienteering team, George settled in Richmond, Virginia. Following college graduation in 1977, he spent four years in the army as an artillery officer, subsequently received his master's degree from the United States Army Command and General Staff College and remained in the Army Reserves until retiring a lieutenant colonel in 2003. This military career coincided with the development of his career as a golf course architect.

Prior to opening his own firm in 1991, George studied with other golf course architects at Golf Services International learning all aspects of golf course design and construction. He attended the Harvard Design School, Golf Course Architecture in 1992, which launched his solo career. George's company, George Golf Design, Inc., is located in Midlothian, Virginia, just outside Richmond. George is a member of the American Society of Golf Course Architects.

George has developed a niche in renovating and restoring classic golf courses designed by architects such as MacDonald, Raynor, Tillinghast, Ross, Flynn, Tull and Wilson - and he has worked with golf facilities on the East Coast (see project listings below).

Using abandoned landfills as a canvas, George successfully transforming two brownfields into golf courses—converting overgrown hazardous areas into plush, green recreational turf.

George's renovation of the Raptor course at Langley Air Force Base posed a challenge when thousands of unexploded bombs were discovered on the site once excavation began.

George's projects have won numerous awards.

Lester George's golf course designs include the following:

Project name	Location	Project Description
Aspen Hill Golf Club	Farmville, VA	Master Plan of Development. Residential, Golf Routing.
Ballyhack Golf Club	Roanoke, VA	Feasibility, Planning, Design and Construction of New 18 Hole Golf Course.
Battenkill Country Club	Greenwich, NY	ASGCA First Links Grant for Design Consulting to Improve Practice and Learning Facilities.
Birkdale Golf Course	Richmond, VA	Design and Construction of Range. Renovation and Regrassing.
Boonsboro Country Club	Lynchburg, VA	Master Plan of Renovations. Design and Construction of Renovations and Additions.
Bow Creek Recreation Facility	Virginia Beach, VA	Golf Course Design Consulting Surrounding Renovation of Municipal Recreation Facility.
Captain's Cove	Greenbackville, VA	Design & Construction of New 18 Hole Course.
Carolina Country Club	Raleigh, NC	Master Plan of Renovations. Practice Facility Study.
Cavalier Golf & Yacht Club	Virginia Beach, VA	Master Plan of Renovations. Design of Improvements. Construction.
City Boy Farms	Louisa, VA	Design and Construction of Short Game Practice Facility.
The Colonial Golf Course	Williamsburg, VA	Feasibility, Planning, Design and Construction of New 18 Hole Golf Course with Design Consultant Robert Wrenn.
Contentment Golf Club	Elkin, NC	Planning, Design & Construction of New 18 Hole Golf Course.
The Country Club of Florida	Boynton Beach, FL	Master Plan of Renovations. Design and Construction.
Country Club of Petersburg	Petersburg, VA	Master Plan of Renovations. Design and Construction of Greens Renovation.
The Country Club of Scranton	Scranton, PA	Master Plan of Renovations. Design of Two New Holes.
The Country Club of Virginia, Tuckahoe Creek Course	Richmond, VA	Master Plan of Renovations. Design and Construction of Bunker and Tee Renovations.
The Country Club of Virginia, Westhampton Course	Richmond, VA	Master Plan of Renovations. Design and Construction of Bunker and Tee Renovations. Redesign and Rebuild Driving Range
The Country Club of Virginia, James River Course	Richmond, VA	Renovation of 18 Greens. Regrassing of Fairways.
Disney's America Theme Park	Haymarket, VA	Feasibility Study. Design of 18 holes.
The DuPont Country Club, The DuPont Course	Wilmington, DE	Master Plan of Renovations For 18 Holes and Practice Facility. Design and Construction of Renovations.
The DuPont Country Club. The Nemours Course	Wilmington, DE	Master Plan of Renovations, 18 Holes. Design of Practice Facility.
Elizabeth Manor Country Club	Portsmouth, VA	Master Plan of Renovations. Design and Construction of Greens Renovation.
Evergreen Country Club	Haymarket, VA	Master Plan of Renovations.
Fauquier Springs Country Club	Warrenton, VA	Master Plan of Renova-tions. Design of Reno-vations. Construction.
The First Tee	Chesterfield, VA	Planning, Design and Construction of One 21-Hole Golf Course.
The First Tee	Columbia, MD	Planning and Design of One 12 Hole Golf Course.
The First Tee	Philadelphia, PA	Planning and Design of Two 9 Hole Golf Courses.
The First Tee	Roanoke, VA	Planning and Design of One 6 Hole Golf Course & Practice facility
The First Tee	Washington, DC	Planning and Design of One 3 Hole and One 9 Hole Golf Course.
The First Tee	Pendleton County, KY	Planning and Design of One 3 Hole Golf Course.
Forest Hills Golf & Resort	Hiroshima, Japan	Design and Construction of New 18 Hole Daily Fee Course.
The Fountainhead Golf Club	Amelia, VA	Master Plan of Development. Feasibility Study.
The Old White Course at The Greenbrier	White Sulphur Springs, WV	18 Hole Master Plan of Restoration. Construction.
Hershey Park, The West Course	Hershey Park, PA	Master Plan, Renovation Plan.
High Vista Country Club	Arden, NC	Design and Construction of 5 New Holes to Golf Course and Residential Development.
Hillendale Country Club	Phoenix, MD	Master Plan of Renovations. Design and Construction.
James River Country Club	Newport News, VA	Master Plan of Renovations. Design, Construction of Greens, Tees and Bunker Renovations.
The Kanawha Club	Goochland, VA	Planning and Design of 9 Hole Golf Course and Practice Facility.
Kiln Creek Golf & Country Club	Newport News, VA	Design and Construction of Additional 4 Holes.
Kincaid Lake State Park	Pendleton County, KY	Design and Construction of New 18 Hole Course.
Kinloch Golf Club	Goochland, VA	Design and Construction, 18 Hole Golf Course and Residential Development with Design Consultant Vinny Giles.
Lambert's Point	Norfolk, VA	Design and Construction of New 9 Hole Golf Course.
Langley Air Force Base	Langley, VA	Master Plan of Renovations for 36 Hole Golf Course. Design and Construction of Greens, Tees and Bunker Renovations.
Lakeview Golf Course	Harrisonburg, VA	Master Plan, Design and Construction of New 9 Holes.
Meadowbrook Country Club	Richmond, VA	Master Plan of Renovations. Design and Construction of Renovations.
Ocean City Golf & Yacht Club, Newport Bay Golf Course	Berlin, MD	Design and Construction of New 18 Hole Course.
Ocean City Golf & Yacht Club, Seaside Course	Berlin, MD	18 Hole Master Plan of Renovations.
Princess Anne Country Club	Virginia Beach, VA	Master Plan of Renovations. Design and Construction of New Practice Facility.
Providence Golf Club	Richmond, VA	Design and Construction of New 18 Hole Course.
Roanoke Country Club	Roanoke, VA	Master Plan of Renovations. Design and Construction of Renovations.
Rock Manor Golf Course	Wilmington, DE	Master Plan of Renovations.
Construction.		
Salem Municipal Golf Course	Salem, VA	Feasibility and Design of New 18 Hole Municipal Golf Course.
The Salisbury Country Club	Midlothian, VA	Master Plan of Renovations. Design, Construction of Greens, Tees and Bunker Renovations. Design and Construction of 9 Hole Addition.
Starmount Forest Country Club	Greensboro, NC	Master Plan of Renovations. Design and Construction.
Sun 'N Air Driving Range	Danvers, MA	Design and Construction of 3 Hole Practice Facility.
Sundance Golf Course	New Braunfels, TX	Feasibility, Planning, Design and Construction of New 18 Hole Executive Golf Course.
Surrywood	Surry, VA	Design of new 18 Hole Daily Fee Golf Course.
University of Richmond	Richmond, VA	Design and Construction of Practice Facility.
Vestavia Country Club	Birmingham, AL	Master Plan of Renovations.
Willow Oaks Country Club	Richmond, VA	Master Plan of Renovations. Design of Renovations. Construction.
