= Rockford Park =

- U.S. National Register of Historic Places
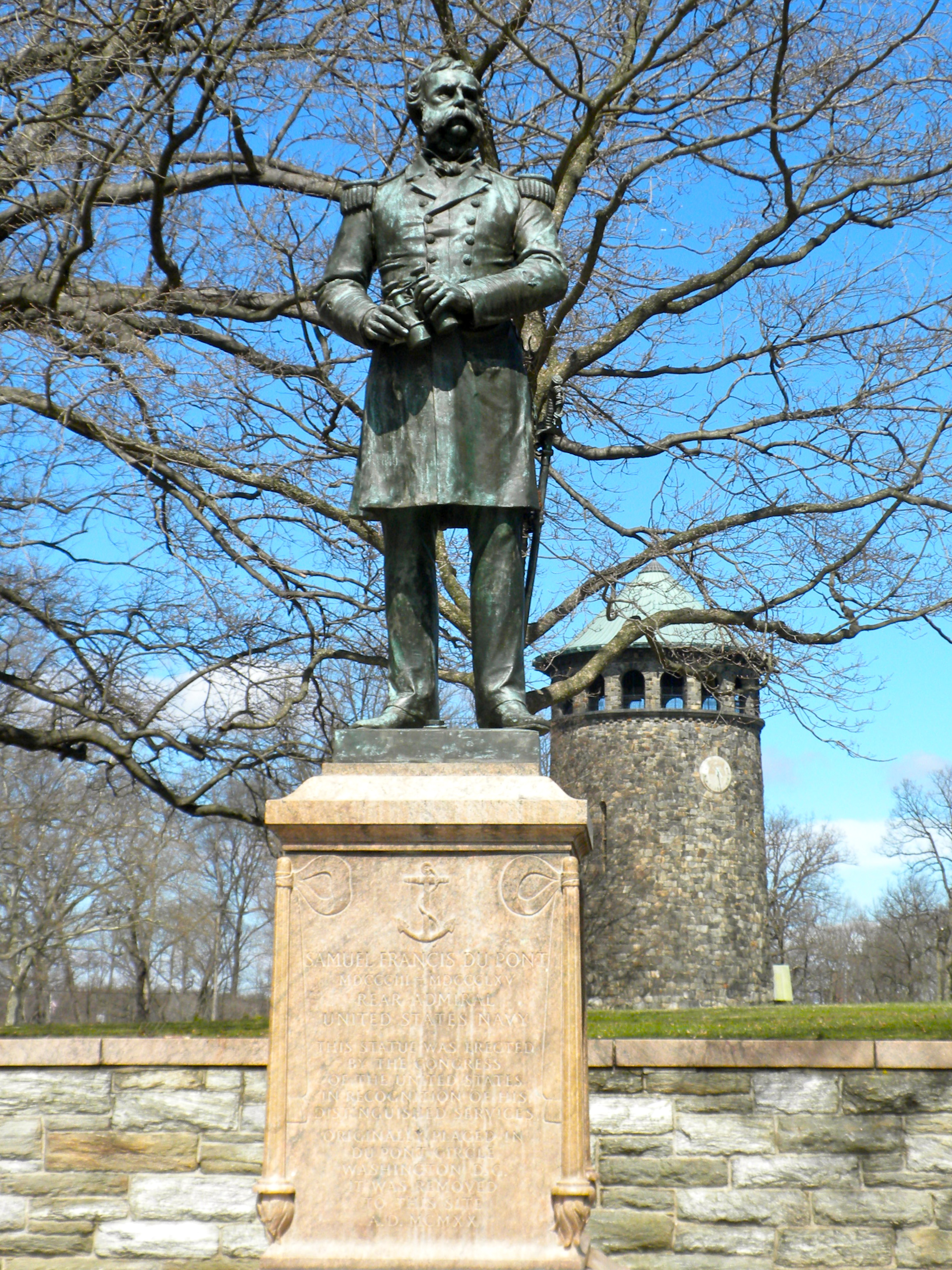
- Admiral Samuel DuPont statue (1884 by Launt Thompson) and Rockford Tower, Rockford Park, March 2010

- Location within Delaware Location within the United States
- Location: Roughly bounded by Red Oak and Rockford Rds., Church and Rising Sun Lanes, and the Brandywine River, Wilmington, Delaware
- Coordinates: 39°46′00″N 75°34′18″W
- Area: 104 acres (42 ha)
- Built: 1889
- NRHP reference No.: 78000912
- Added to NRHP: September 20, 1978

Rockford Park is a historic public park located in a residential area of Wilmington, New Castle County, Delaware. It is characterized by a large, grassy meadow which slopes gently upward to a large knoll overlooking the Brandywine River.

It was added to the National Register of Historic Places in 1978. The park is a unit of Delaware's Wilmington State Parks.

== History ==
Rockford is one of the oldest parks in the city of Wilmington. It was originally conceived by philanthropist and conservationist William Poole Bancroft, who played an instrumental role in the creation of other city, state, and federal parks in Delaware (such as First State National Historical Park). Bancroft was one of the primary sponsors behind the Delaware legislature's creation of the Board of Park Commissioners in 1883, and he served on the Board from its inception until 1922. He owned the land that houses Rockford Park today, and offered to donate it for park land at the very first meeting of the Board of Park Commissioners. At the recommendation of Frederick Law Olmsted, the Board instead focused first on establishing the nearby Brandywine Park. Once that was done, Olmsted visited Bancroft's Rockford land in 1889 and issued a positive report to the Board recommending accepting the land and establishing the park. Later in 1889, Bancroft donated 59 acres of his property to form Rockford Park, and he convinced the du Pont family to donate an additional 9 acres of land.

In 1901, a 115-foot stone building named Rockford Tower was constructed to serve two purposes, as both a water tower and an observation tower. It contains a steel cylinder water tank, surrounded by a staircase which leads to the highest level of the tower. On the highest level, large stone arches allow for a view of the park and the Brandywine River below.

== Memorials ==
There are three notable memorials in Rockford Park.

The first is Canby Seat, a granite bench and memorial to botanist William M. Canby. Canby was the first President of the Board of Park Commissioners and he was responsible for allocating the funds which developed the park after Bancroft donated the land. The stone bench was constructed in 1905 and provides a scenic view of the Brandywine in a spot which was one of Canby's favorites.

The second memorial is a statue of Rear Admiral Samuel Francis Du Pont near the park's main entrance. The statue was commissioned by Congress in 1882 and sculpted by Launt Thompson in 1884. It originally stood in Washington, D.C.'s Dupont Circle, which was named after the Civil War hero, but as several family members considered it an insufficient memorial for the national capital, they received permission to replace it with a new memorial which they would fund themselves. The statue was moved to Rockford Park in 1917.

The last memorial is to William Poole Bancroft. The Bancroft Memorial is a stone terrace with a semicircular stone outcropping. On the outcropping is a large stone with a cast bronze plaque commemorating Bancroft's accomplishment. The memorial was constructed in 1937 and is centrally located within the park.
