= Brandywine Creek State Park =

State park in Delaware, United States

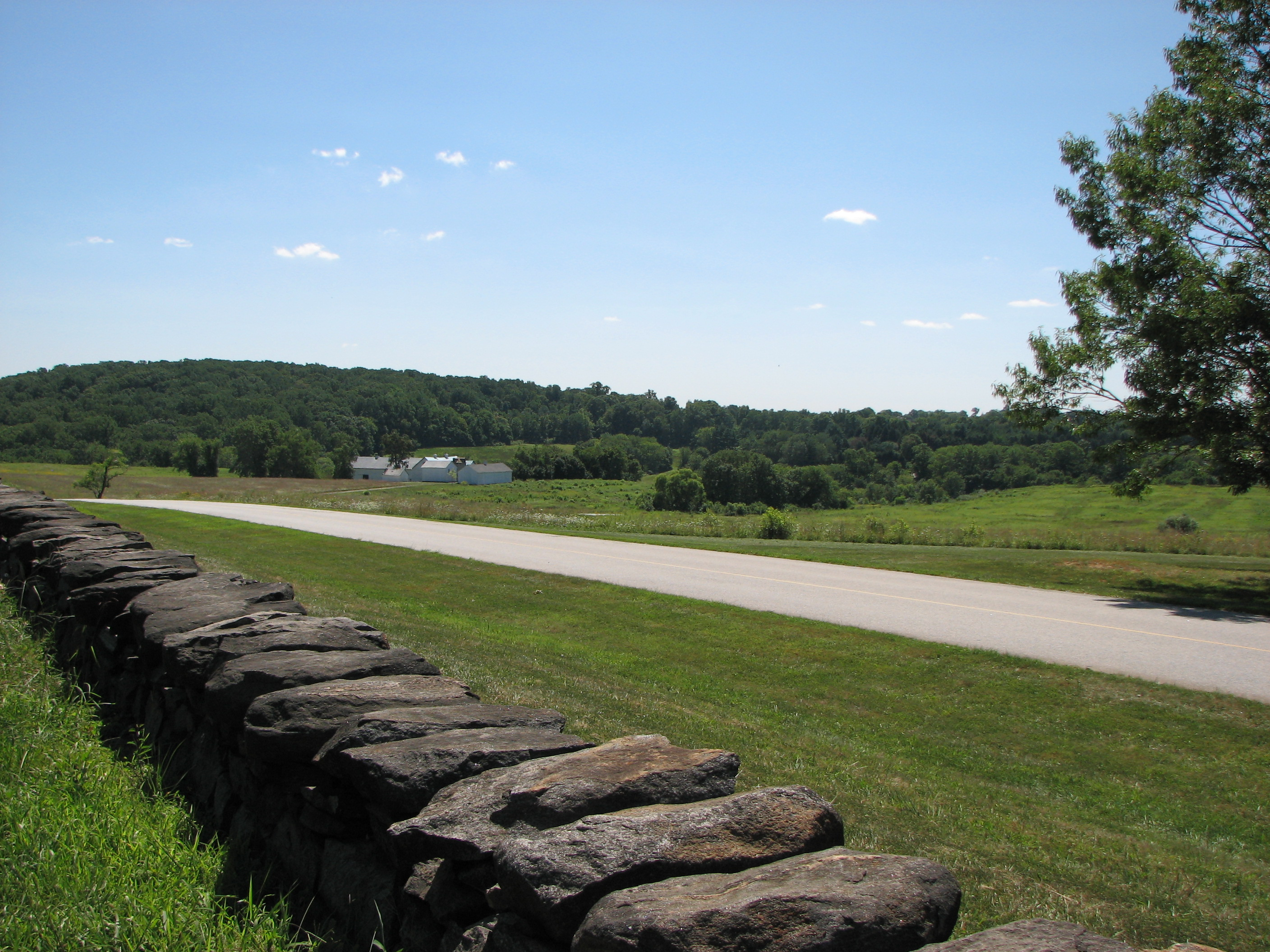
- Farm, field and forest near the park headquarters.

- Location within Delaware Location within the United States
- Interactive map of Brandywine Creek State Park
- Location: New Castle County, Delaware, United States
- Coordinates: 39°48′40″N 75°33′59″W
- Area: 951.33 acres (384.99 ha)
- Elevation: 135 feet (41 m)
- Established: 1965
- Administrator: Delaware Department of Natural Resources and Environmental Control
- Website: Official website

Brandywine Creek State Park is a public recreation area located three miles (4.8 km) north of Wilmington, Delaware along the Brandywine Creek. The state park is 951.33 acres (384.99 ha) in area and much of the park was part of a Du Pont family estate and dairy farm before becoming a state park in 1965. It contains the first two nature preserves in Delaware, Tulip Tree Woods and Freshwater Marsh. Flint Woods is a satellite area of the park and has become the park's third nature preserve. Flint Woods is home to species of rare song birds and an old-growth forest.

== History ==
Much of Brandywine Creek State Park was originally a portion of the du Pont family's Winterthur estate. The estate was acquired by General Henry du Pont in 1866, and between the time of purchase and 1875 he expanded the estate's size to 1,135 acres (459 ha). After du Pont's son, Henry A. du Pont took over the estate in 1875, he continued to expand the estate until it was over 2,400 acres (970 ha). In the mid-1800s, the du Ponts hired Italian masons to build stone walls around much of the property that is today part of the park. In 1893, Henry A. du Pont acquired the herd of dairy cattle that he housed on what would eventually become the park.

Henry Francis du Pont inherited the estate in 1927. He was much less interested in maintaining a working farm than his father and grandfather, and instead had an eye toward transforming the estate into a museum of American arts. To that end, he sold off pieces of the estate in 1951, reducing it from 2,400 acres (970 ha) down to a core of 962 acres (389 ha). 433 acres (175 ha) of the sold-off estate were purchased by du Pont's relative, Ellen Coleman du Pont Wheelwright (daughter of T. Coleman du Pont) and her husband Robert Wheelwright. Wheelwright was a prominent landscape architect who had in 1924 founded the University of Pennsylvania's landscape architecture school. The Wheelwrights maintained the estate until Robert's death in 1965.

With plans in motion to transform the rural scenic estate into housing developments, local citizens convinced the state that it should preserve the land. With a grant from the United States Land and Water Conservation Fund that had been established earlier that year, and with additional grants from Pierre S. du Pont's Longwood Foundation, the state purchased the 433 acres (175 ha) and established Brandywine Creek State Park in 1965.

The park was brought up to its present size in 1981, when an additional 500 acres (200 ha) were donated to the state by William Poole Bancroft's Woodlawn Trustees. Bancroft, a nationally recognized land conservationist with a deep appreciation for the beauty of the Brandywine, had become concerned about the expansion of nearby Wilmington and purchased a considerable amount of land in the Brandywine region with the intention of preserving it as open space parkland for future generations. He had also established the Trustees to continue acquiring land around the Brandywine after his death to be managed as parkland.

The Brandywine Valley National Scenic Byway runs along the border of Brandywine Creek State Park, and as of 2013, the park is adjacent to over 1,000 acres (400 ha) of additional Woodlawn land that was donated to the federal government to form First State National Historical Park.

== Activities and amenities ==
Eighteen miles of trails run through the park, the longest being the Rocky Run Trail and the Greenway Trail. Brandywine Creek has a large population of bass, and Wilson's Run is known for its trout. The Brandywine Creek Nature Center offers natural history and environmental education programs for visitors, school and scout groups, and other organizations. Programs include nature crafts and lectures, hayrides, guided nature walks, children's programs, and birding programs.

== Ecology ==
The park's forests are part of the Northeastern coastal forests ecoregion.
