= Brandywine Park =

- U.S. National Register of Historic Places
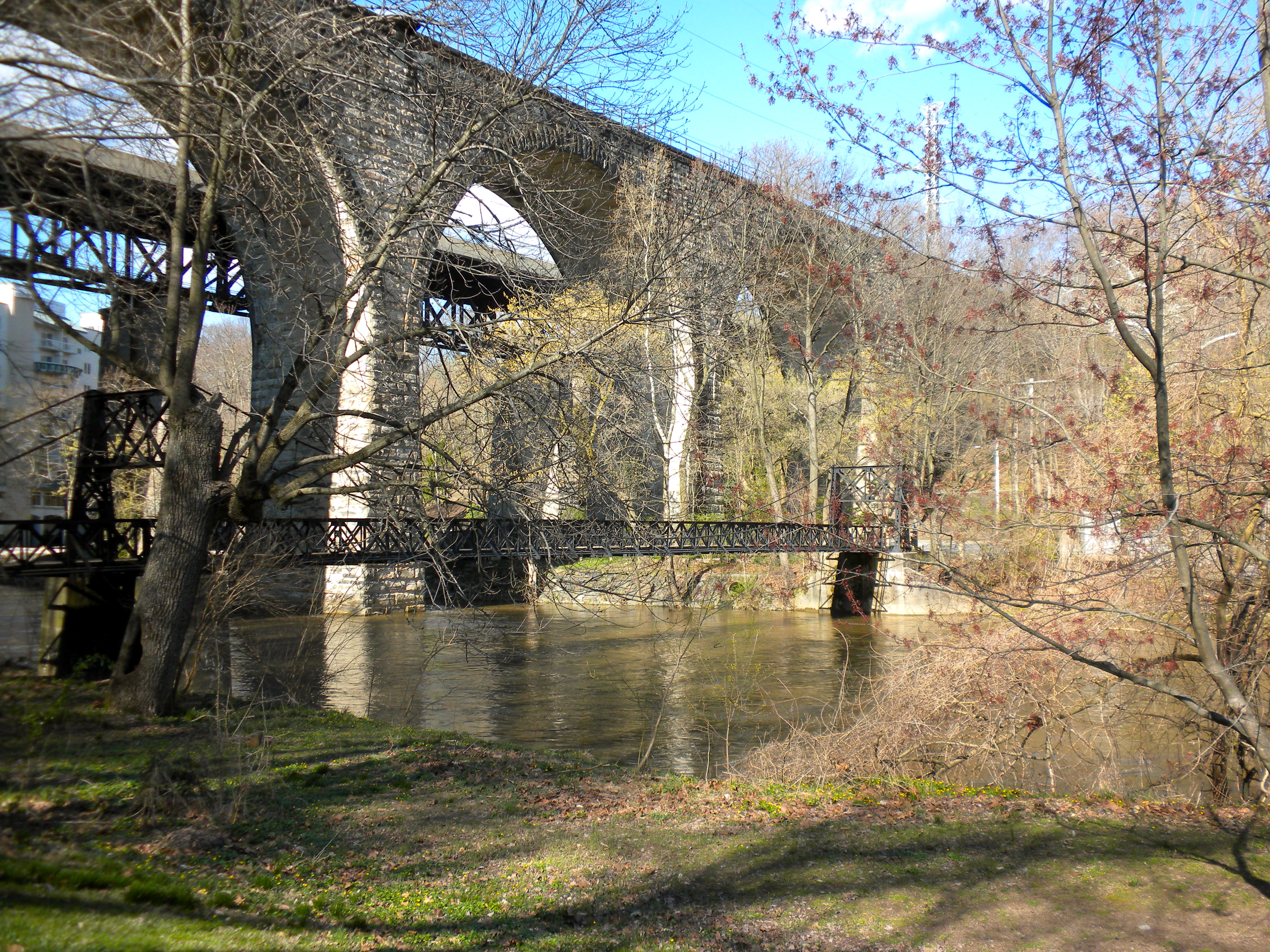

- Location within Delaware Location within the United States
- Location: Roughly bounded by Augustine, 18th, and Market Sts. and Lovering Ave., Wilmington, Delaware
- Coordinates: 39.757424°N 75.553590°W
- Area: 175 acres (71 ha)
- Built: 1886
- Architect: Samuel Canby
- NRHP reference No.: 76000574 (original); 81000192 (increase)

Significant dates
- Added to NRHP: December 22, 1976
- Boundary increase: July 23, 1981

Brandywine Park was the first city park established by the city of Wilmington, Delaware. It is located on the banks of Brandywine Creek, between Augustine Road and North Market Street. The park was established in 1886, and was designed by Samuel Canby, the city's parks commissioner, in consultation with Frederick Law Olmsted. Although initially laid out as a bucolic park with winding paths and roadways, it has since expanded to include active recreation facilities.

The park is approximately 178 acres and it spans both the north and south banks of the Brandywine. Much of the park has been preserved as a mix of wilderness and open space with walking trails and scenic views of the creek and surrounding woods. The open space section of the park includes two formal gardens, a rose garden and a cherry blossom garden. The Brandywine Zoo was created in 1905 and now occupies 4.75 acres of the park. Brandywine Park also includes active recreational facilities including playgrounds, athletic fields, and Abessinio Stadium.

The park was listed on the National Register of Historic Places in 1976. It is a unit of Delaware's Wilmington State Parks.

== See also ==
- Brandywine Creek State Park
- National Register of Historic Places listings in Wilmington, Delaware
