= Bancroft Mills =

- Bancroft and Sons Cotton Mills
- U.S. National Register of Historic Places
- U.S. Historic district
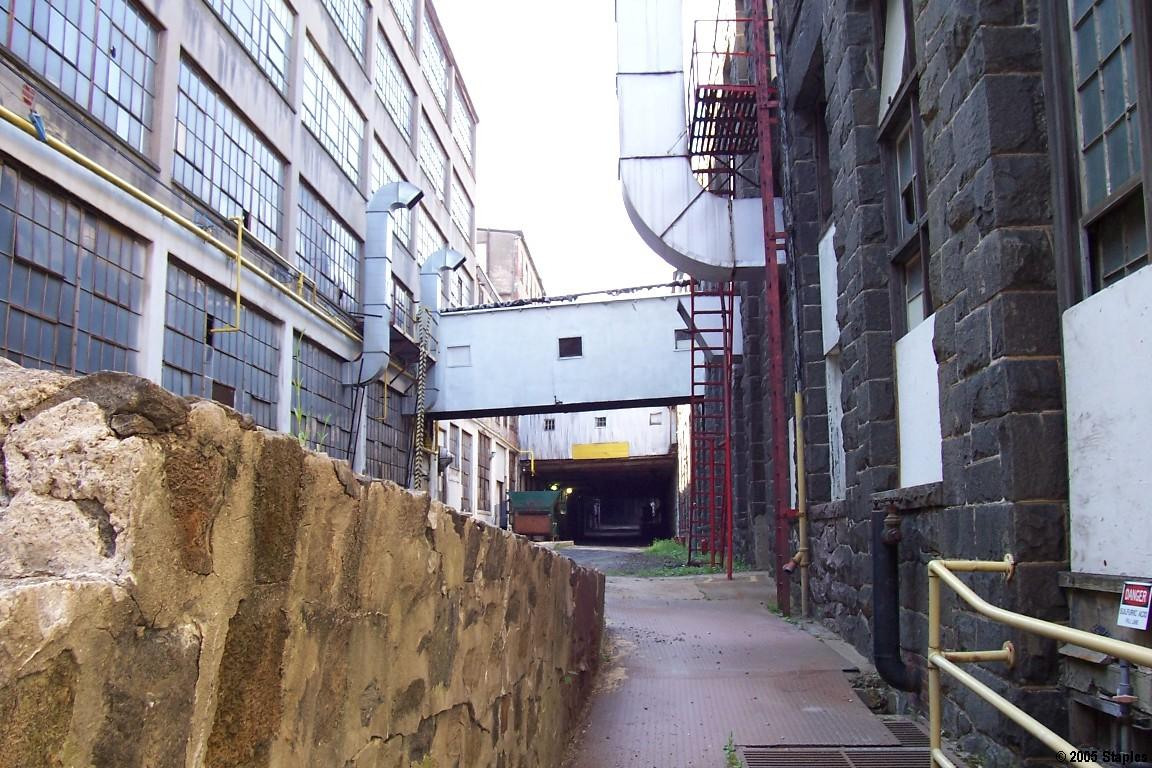
- Bancroft Mills in 2005
- Location: Rockford Road, Wilmington, Delaware
- Coordinates: 39.7683°N 75.5631°W
- Built: 1787
- NRHP reference No.: 84000439
- Added to NRHP: 1984-12-20

Bancroft Mills is an abandoned mill complex along Brandywine Creek in Wilmington, Delaware, United States. It has been the site of some of the earliest and most famous mills near Wilmington and was the largest and longest running complex along the Brandywine.

== History ==
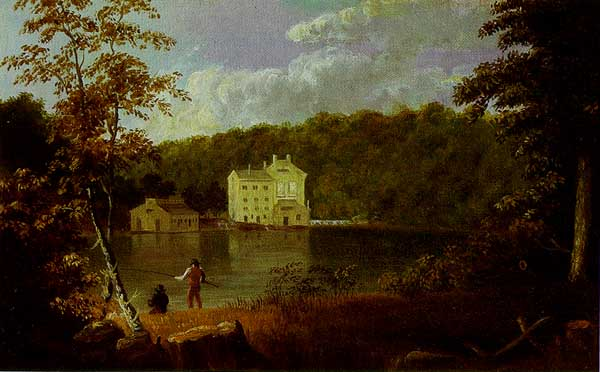
"Gilpin's Mill on the Brandywine" attributed to Thomas Doughty circa 1827

=== Establishment and change of leadership: 1831–1895 ===
Joseph Bancroft (1803–1874), an English immigrant who had worked in the Midlands textile industry, established Bancroft Mills in 1831. The mill was rebuilt following an 1839 flood and was expanded several times, including a large 1895 expansion. By 1880, the mill was already the largest cotton finishing mill in the United States. Joseph Bancroft's son Samuel Bancroft, publisher of the Wilmington newspaper Every Evening and a major philanthropist, took control in the 1880s. His collection of pre-Raphaelite paintings formed the basis of the Delaware Art Museum. His brother William Poole Bancroft donated nearby land to start Wilmington's extensive park system, and his donation for a public library is also considered the beginning of the Wilmington Public Library.

=== Consolidation and innovation: 1895–1961 ===
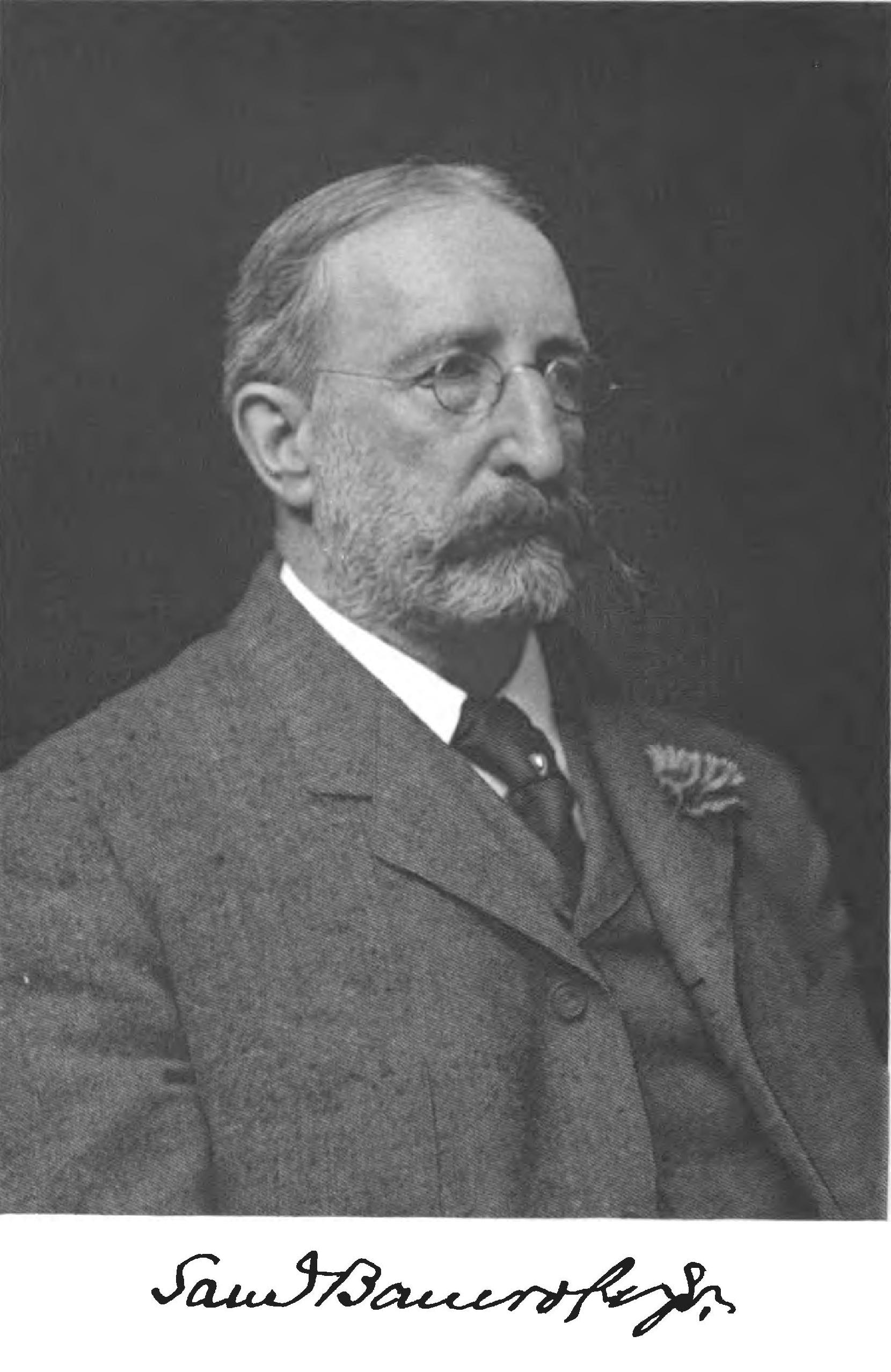
Samuel Bancroft ca. 1919

The mills were consolidated in 1895 by the Bancroft family partnership, which was soon reformed into a corporation. While other mills produced high-quality cloth, the Bancroft Mills were noted for their technological innovation and for finishing cloth that had been produced elsewhere. They were especially noted for producing fabric window shades. Bancroft introduced the mercerizing process into the United States, and pioneered the use of synthetic fabrics in weaving. They introduced the first permanent crease fabrics and Ban-Lon.

As textile producers left the northeastern United States for the southern states, the production buildings of Bancroft Mills closed in 1961 and the Bancroft Company was purchased by Indian Head Mills, Inc.

=== Re-purposing of the mills ===
The complex was recently owned by Wilmington Piece Dye company which went bankrupt in May 2003. The site was then bought by O'Neill Properties Group, a company specializing in the renovation and revitalization of disused or potentially dangerous parcels of land. In September 2015, Bancroft Mills became a large luxury condominium complex, called Rockford Falls. Today the complex stands as a reminder of the significant milling history of the Brandywine Valley.

Around 1:30 a.m. May 2, 2015, a fire was reported at the site. Wilmington FD as well as volunteer fire companies from New Castle County in Delaware as well as companies from Chester and Delaware counties in Pennsylvania responded. The building was under demolition at the time of the fire.

Early in the morning of November 9, 2016, fire engulfed a large section of the abandoned property, destroying several of the historic mill buildings. As of that day the cause had not yet been determined. The rest of the Bancroft Mills, including its last remaining chimney and factory buildings along the creek, were completely demolished after the most recent fire. The land was purchased by Delaware-based real estate company Capano Management, who built new luxury apartment homes called The Falls.

== Innovations in textile production ==
In the 1930s, Bancroft Mills patented two different production processes. Ban-Lon is a type of rayon that is bulkier than standard yarns and Everglaze was a cotton finishing process that made the fabric more dense like wool. Ban-Lon was very popular in the 1960s and 1970s making the licensing of it a profitable business for the company. In 1961, the Mills stopped producing textiles and began to rely on the royalties from their patents.

== Miss America sponsorship ==
From the 1940s through the 1960s, the Bancroft Company became the primary sponsor of the Miss America Pageant. The sponsorship was an effort to promote its patented textile production processes by having Miss America contestants wear clothing made of Ban-Lon and Everglaze. During these years, the Bancroft Company put money towards scholarships for Miss America winners and, in return, Miss America contestants were required to take photo shoots wearing their products.

== See also ==
- Eleutherian Mills
- National Register of Historic Places listings in Wilmington, Delaware
