= Delaware Department of Natural Resources and Environmental Control =

State agency of Delaware, United States

Agency overview
- Formed: 1970
- Preceding agencies: Board of Game and Fish; Shell Fisheries Commission; State Park Commission; Water and Air Resources Commission; State Forestry and State Soil and Water Commission

Jurisdictional structure
- Operations jurisdiction: United States
- Legal jurisdiction: Delaware

Operational structure
- Headquarters: Richardson & Robbins Building, 89 Kings Hwy SW, Dover, DE 19901
- Elected officer responsible: Gregory Patterson, Secretary

Website
- https://dnrec.delaware.gov/

The Department of Natural Resources and Environmental Control (DNREC), a cabinet agency in the executive branch of state government in Delaware, is concerned with the governance of public land, natural resources and environmental regulations for the state. DNREC is composed of various subagencies: the Office of the Secretary; the Division of Air Quality; the Division of Waste and Hazardous Substances; the Division of Water; the Division of Climate, Coastal and Energy; the Division of Fish and Wildlife; the Division of Parks and Recreation; and the Division of Watershed Stewardship. Its offices are primarily based in Dover, the state capital.

== Mission and organization ==
The agency's mission is to:

- “Engage all stakeholders to ensure the wise management, conservation and enhancement of the State’s natural resources
- “Protect public health and the environment
- “Provide quality outdoor recreation
- “Improve the quality of life
- “Lead energy policy and climate preparedness
- “And educate the public on historic, cultural and natural resource use, requirements and issues.”

=== Organization ===
Over the years, DNREC was reorganized, and the four original divisions were split into seven, with each led by a director and the divisions specified in state law. The agency also contains a central administrative office.

The Division of Parks and Recreation oversees 17 state parks and the Brandywine Zoo, together comprising more than 20,000 acres. It also manages nature preserves and conservation easements and is responsible for some historic sites, such as Fort Delaware and Fort DuPont. More than 8 million people visited Delaware parks in 2022. Delaware, Florida, and Ohio are the only states to have won the American Academy for Park and Recreation Administration National Gold Medal Award multiple times.

The Division of Climate, Coastal and Energy focuses on climate change, energy, and coastal programs in the state.

The Division of Air Quality issues permits and regulations around air pollution, including emissions, asbestos removal, and open burning.

The Division of Fish and Wildlife is responsible for conservation and offers licenses and education for hunting, fishing, and boating. It oversees roughly 68,000 acres of public land.

The Division of Waste and Hazardous Substances’ purview revolves around recycling, investigating and cleaning up contaminated sites, responding to incidents that involve hazardous materials, and ensuring citizens and companies follow existing laws around waste and hazardous substances.

The Division of Water manages and protects the First State's water resources, performing research, offering regulatory guidance, handling licensing, and more.

The related Division of Watershed Stewardship is responsible for protecting Delaware's soil, water, and coastlines. It oversees wetlands and dredging and contains an environmental laboratory.

Additionally, the Office of the Secretary handles administration for the Department and contains the Office of Budget and Finance, the Office of Administrative Services, the Office of Communications, the Office of Environmental Justice, the Office of Business Services, and the Office of Human Resources. These units are responsible for areas like budgeting, marketing, public hearings, environmental justice, human resources and legislative affairs. The Office of Communications offers guidance relating to and works on branding, marketing, community engagement, media relations, internal messages, event planning, web publishing, social media and multimedia production. It publishes DNREC news releases and oversees the agency's online magazine, Delaware, and its digital newsletter. Also included in the Office of the Secretary is a certified law enforcement agency, Delaware Natural Resource Police, which is organized into three units: Environmental Crimes, Fish and Wildlife, and Parks and Recreation.

DNREC hosts a number of public committees, boards, and other panels that handle specific issues like energy, fishing, and open spaces.

== History ==
DNREC was established in 1970 through legislation passed by the Delaware General Assembly the year before. Previously, six commissions had been charged with overseeing the First State's natural resources: the Board of Game and Fish, Shell Fisheries, State Park, Water and Air Resources, State Forestry and State Soil and Water.

In April 2005, the first law enforcement shooting in the history of the Department took place. The incident involved two park rangers and resulted in the death of a robbery suspect.

In 2007 DNREC completed the first version of the Delaware Wildlife Action Plan, a strategy to conserve native wildlife and their habitats.

In 2014 Secretary Collin O’Mara left the post after five years to become the head of the National Wildlife Federation. He was succeeded by longtime DNREC employee David Small, who served for about three years until Governor Jack Markell departed office and his successor, John Carney, named Shawn Garvin, a former Environmental Protection Agency official, as secretary.

In 2015 there was an updated version of the Delaware Wildlife Action Plan. This edition was a 10-year plan to conserve all fish and wildlife and their habitats. The plan lays out specific species which are in the greatest need of protection, their habitats, possible issues, research areas, and conservation techniques. The plan also focuses on increasing knowledge through education and outreach. These projects was funded through federal State Wildlife Grants. The plan was updated in 2025, listing about 700 species considered to be in need of conservation action or further study.

In 2021 the Department unveiled the Delaware Climate Action Plan, a playbook designed to direct decisionmakers as to what steps to take when it comes to combating climate change. As the lowest-lying state in the country, Delaware is at particular risk of sea level rise. The Climate Action Plan focuses on mitigating the worst effects of climate change while proactively working to take bold steps to get ahead of the issue. The plan calls for lessening greenhouse gas emissions through a move to clean and renewable energy, using energy efficiency measures, transitioning to zero-emissions vehicles, managing greenhouse gases other than carbon dioxide, and fighting carbon emissions by preserving forests and greenspaces that absorb CO_{2} from the atmosphere.

In 2023, Secretary Shawn Garvin announced the state would adopt regulations requiring car manufacturers to deliver an increasing percentage of zero-emission vehicles to the state. Officials expressed hope the regulations would make it easier for Delawareans to drive electric and reduce the amount of greenhouse gases released to the atmosphere. However, when Gov. Matt Meyer took office in 2025, he rescinded the policy.

Greg Patterson, a career civil servant, became the 12th secretary of the Department in 2025 after he was confirmed by the Delaware Senate in January. One of Patterson's main goals has been highlighting for the public the work the Department does, and he has worked with the Office of Communications to launch a popular initiative called Field Trip Fridays where he visits a different DNREC program or service almost every week. These visits and explanations of various facets of DNREC's duties are shared on the agency's social media and YouTube pages.

For the fiscal year ending June 30, 2027, DNREC was allocated about $183 million from the state budget, including 784 positions.

== List of department secretaries ==
Secretary	Term began	Term ended
Austin N. Heller	1970	1973
John C. Bryson	1973	1977
Austin P. Olney	1977	1979
John E. “Jack” Wilson III	1980	1988
Edwin H. “Toby” Clark II	1989	1993
Christophe Tulou	1993	1998
Nicholas D. DiPasquale	1999	2002
John A. Hughes	2002	2009
Collin P. O’Mara	2009	2014
David S. Small	2014	2017
Shawn M. Garvin	2017	2025
Greg Patterson	2025	Incumbent

== See also ==
- List of Delaware state parks
- List of Delaware state wildlife areas
- Fishing in Delaware
- Delaware Geological Survey
- List of state and territorial fish and wildlife management agencies in the United States
