= List of beaches in Delaware =

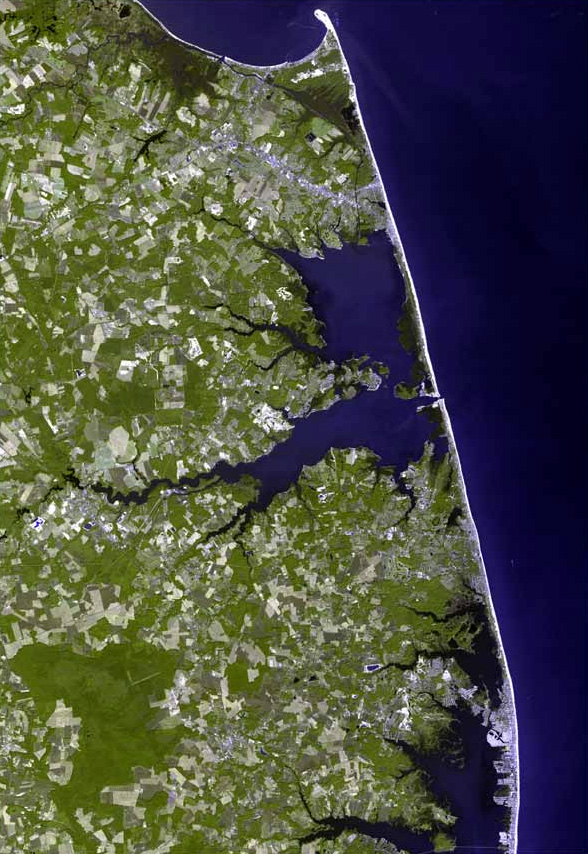
Aerial image of the Delaware Beaches

The Delaware Beaches are located along the Atlantic Ocean in the eastern part of Sussex County, Delaware, which is in the southern part of the state. In addition to beaches along the ocean, the area offers many amenities, including restaurants, nightlife, fishing, golf courses, boardwalk areas, and tax-free shopping. The beaches are popular tourist destinations for residents from the nearby areas of Washington, D.C., Baltimore, Wilmington, Philadelphia, South Jersey, and Hampton Roads. Out of the 30 states with coastline, the Delaware Beaches ranked number 1 in water quality in 2011 and again in 2014.

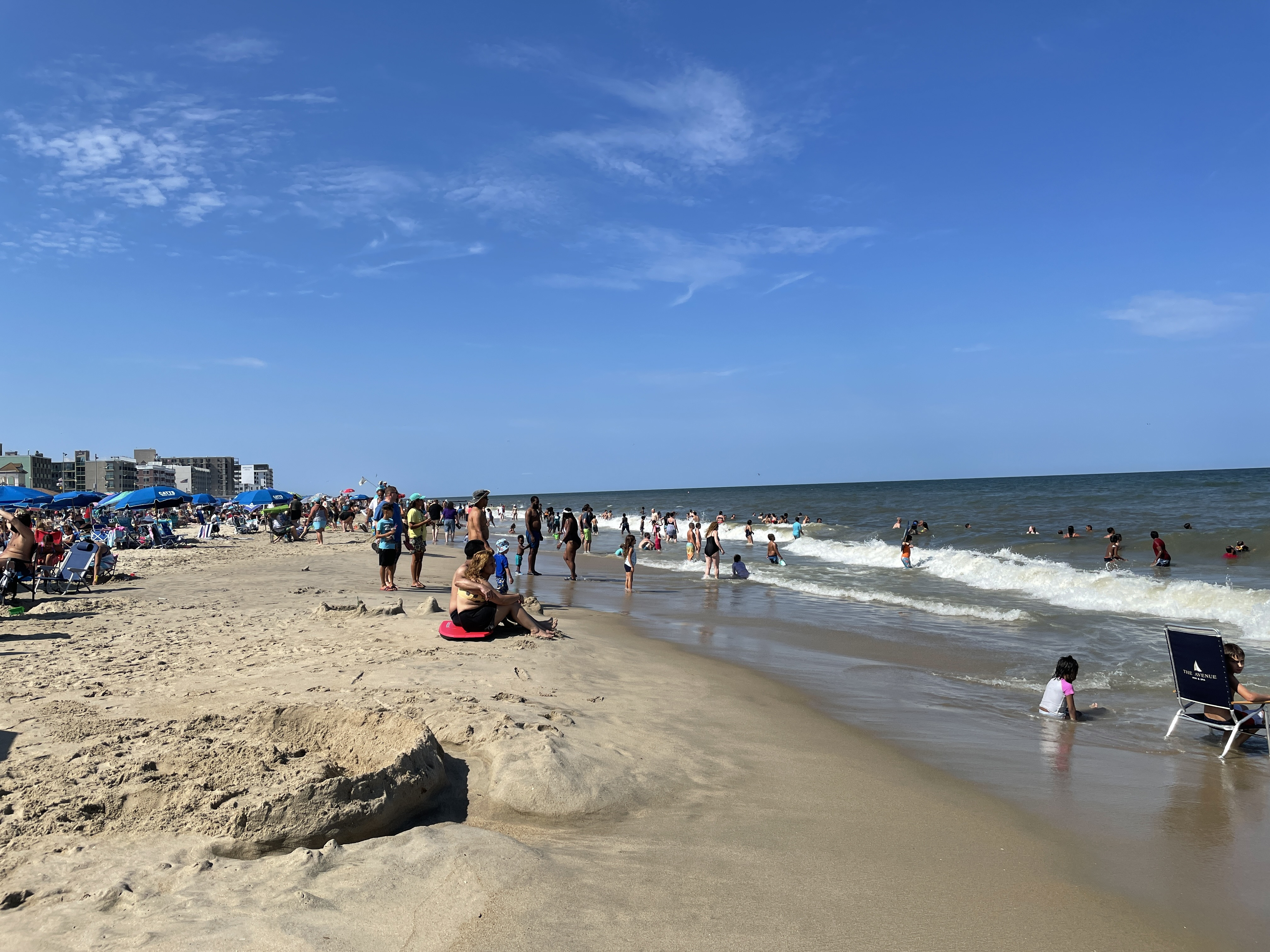
Rehoboth Beach

== List of beaches ==
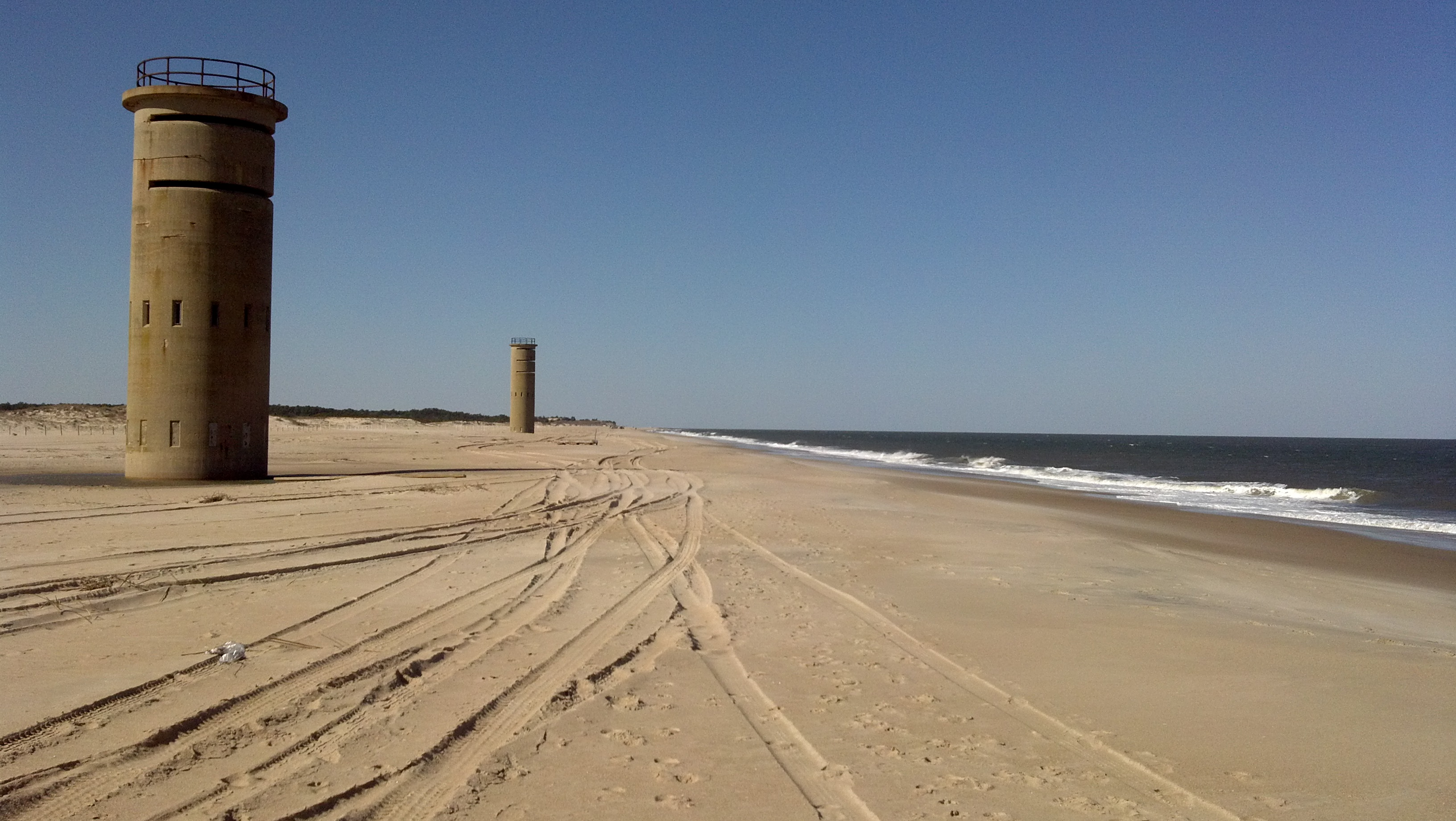
Cape Henlopen State Park

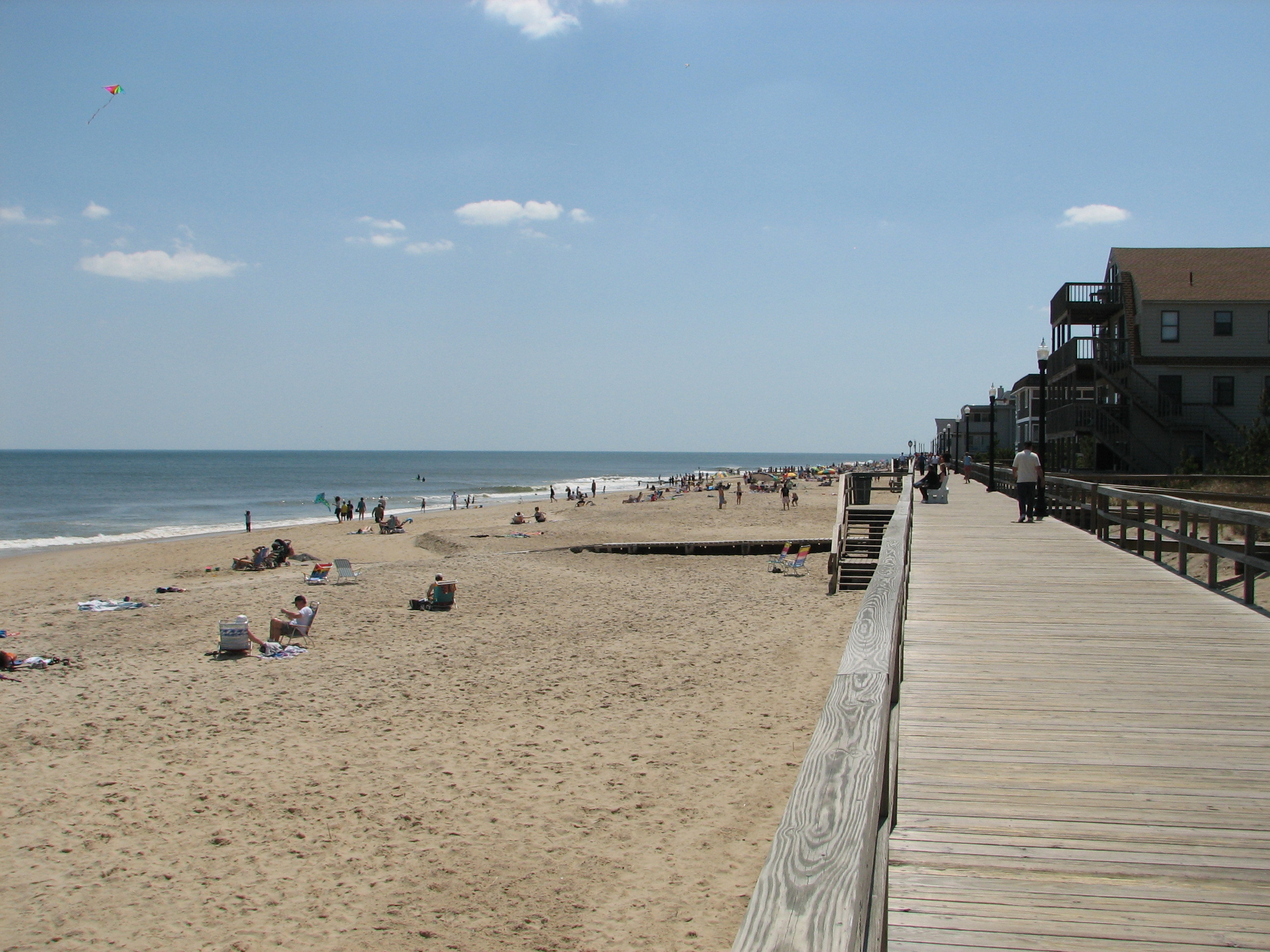
Bethany Beach

Beaches in Delaware from north to south:

- Delaware River / Delaware Bay:
  - Augustine Beach
  - Woodland Beach
  - Fraland Beach
  - Pickering Beach
  - Kitts Hummock
  - Bowers Beach
  - Bennett's Pier Beach
  - Big Stone Beach
  - Slaughter Beach
  - Fowler Beach
  - Primehook Beach
  - Broadkill Beach
  - Lewes (on Delaware Bay)
- Cape Henlopen State Park
- North Shores
- Henlopen Acres
- Rehoboth Beach
- Dewey Beach
- Indian Beach
- Delaware Seashore State Park
  - Tower Beach
  - Coin Beach
- Sussex Shores
- Bethany Beach
- Middlesex Beach (38°31′21″N 75°03′15″W)
- South Bethany
- York Beach (38°30′34″N 75°3′11″W)
- Fenwick Island State Park
- Fenwick Island

== History ==
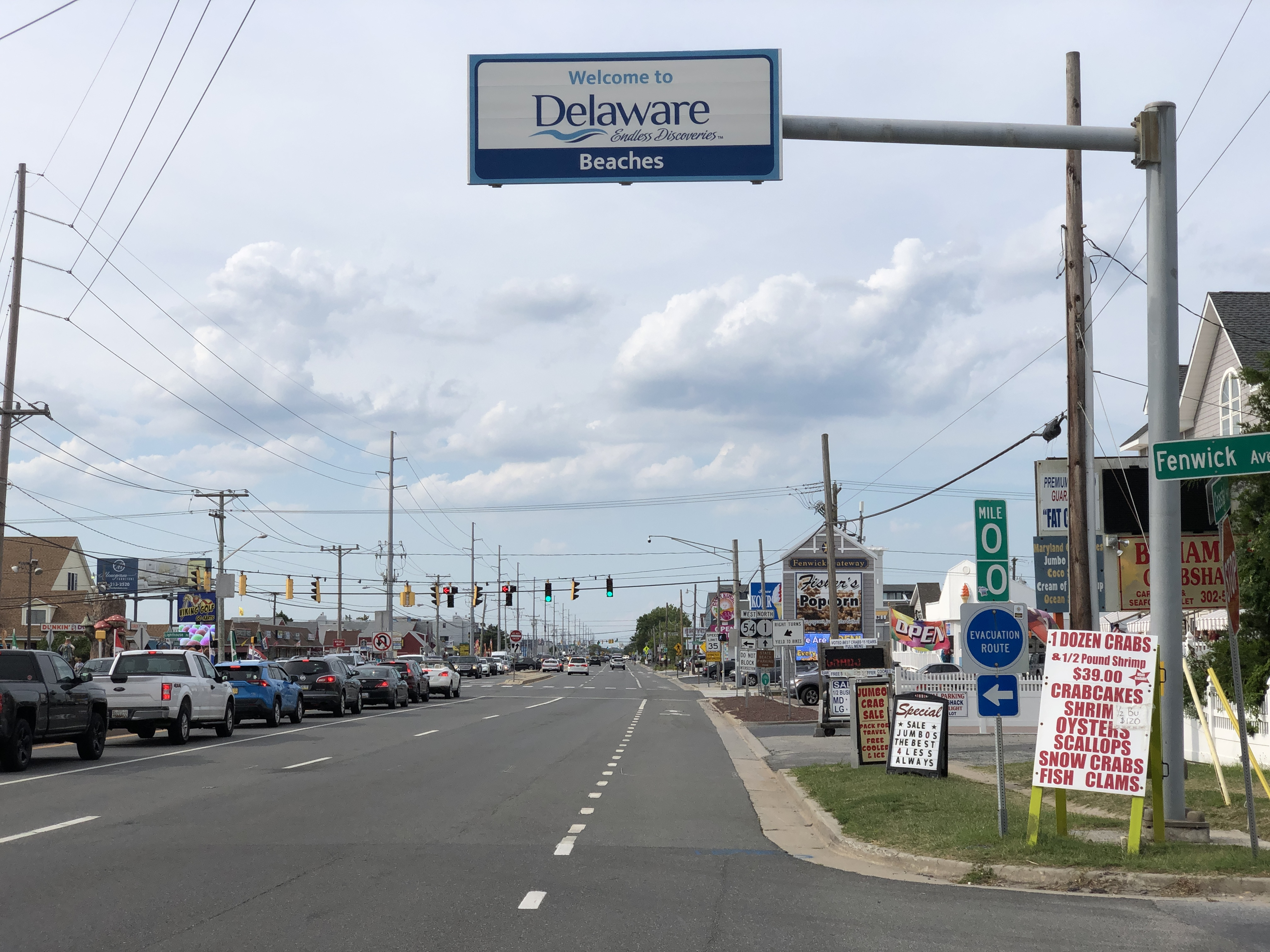
Sign on Delaware Route 1 northbound in Fenwick Island welcoming motorists to the state's beaches

In 2003, the Delaware Senate passed a bill for the coastal area of Delaware to be referred to as the "Delaware Beaches", as Delaware residents refer to their coastline as the "beach" and not the "shore" like the Jersey Shore in New Jersey. The bill called for DelDOT to change signage directing motorists to the beaches from "Shore Points" to "Beaches".

== Demographics ==
The Delaware Beaches area, particularly the Cape Region, tend to be more affluent and populous than western portions of Sussex County. The combined population of all of the ZIP codes in the Delaware Beaches area is about 43,851 (2009). The median household income in 2009 was $77,030.

== Economy ==
According to SeaGrant Delaware, the Delaware Beaches generate $6.9 billion annually and over $711 million in tax revenue.

== See also ==
- List of beaches
- List of beaches in New England
- List of beaches in the United States
