= Poplar Thicket =

Archaeological site in Delaware, United States

- U.S. National Register of Historic Places
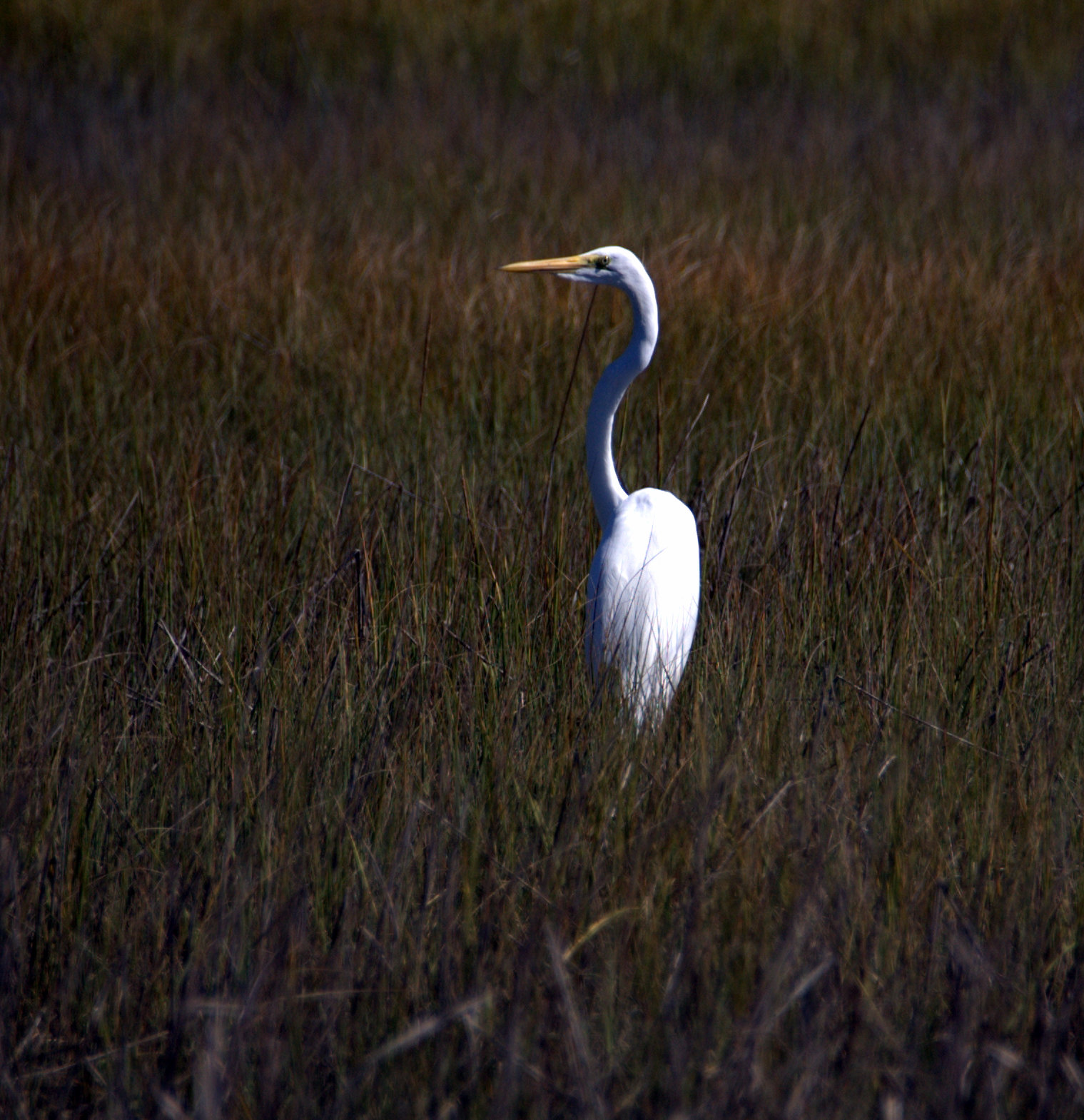

- Location within Delaware Location within the United States
- Location: west of the Indian River inlet on Long Neck, near Bethany Beach, Delaware
- Coordinates: 38°37′12″N 75°8′14″W
- Area: 140 acres (57 ha)
- Built: 1918
- NRHP reference No.: 78003177
- Added to NRHP: December 29, 1978

Poplar Thicket, also known as Marian R. Okie Memorial Wildlife Preserve at Poplar Thicket, is an archaeological site located in Long Neck, Delaware. Poplar Thicket is the name of a farm purchased by L.P. Faucett in 1918. It consists of forest, marshes, and wetlands spread across a quarter-mile of undisturbed Indian River Bayshore. Austin Okie, a grandson of Faucett, donated the property to The Nature Conservancy in October 2007, to serve as a bird refuge. The property was subsequently transferred to the state of Delaware, establishing it as the Marian R. Okie Memorial Wildlife Preserve at Poplar Thicket. The property is administered by the Delaware Department of Natural Resources and Environmental Control and serves as a bird sanctuary, used for conservation education and environmentally-sensitive activities such as bird-watching and walking.

It was listed on the National Register of Historic Places in 1978.

== See also ==
- National Register of Historic Places listings in Sussex County, Delaware
