= Cotton Patch Hills =

Community in Bethany Beach, Delaware, US

Coordinates: 38.5378°N 75.0619°W

Cotton Patch Hills is a community in Bethany Beach, Delaware. Cotton Patch Hills derives its name from the cotton flotsam which spread over the shore dunes after a Spanish merchant vessel ran aground in the 1700s. The vessel contained animal hides, furs, horses, ivory, two elephants, and a giraffe calve.
