= Delaware Seashore State Park =

State park in Delaware, United States

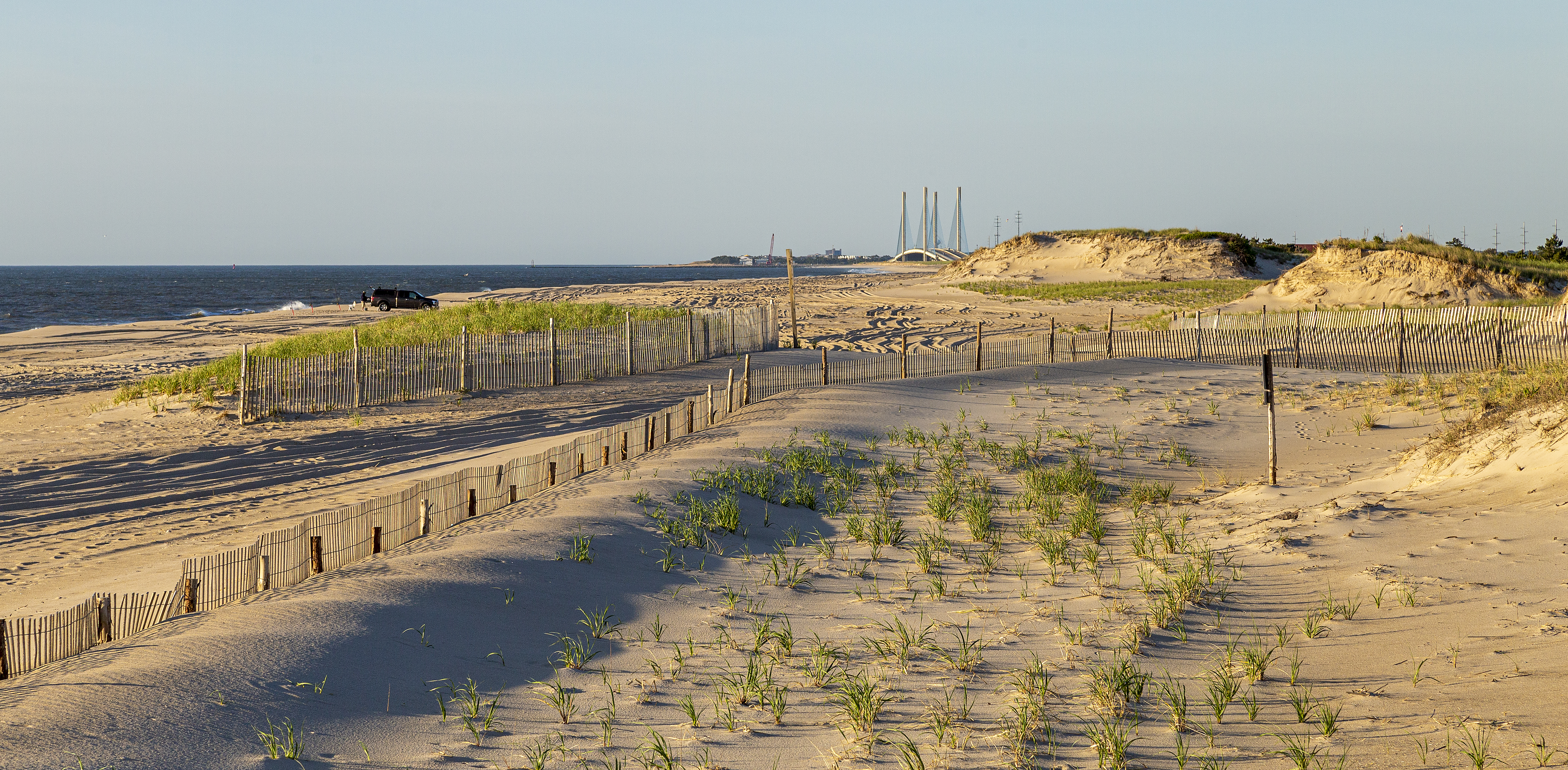
- Beach and dunes at Delaware Seashore State Park north of Indian River Inlet

- Location within Delaware Location within the United States
- Location: Sussex County, Delaware, United States
- Coordinates: 38°36′37″N 75°04′05″W
- Area: 2,722.87 acres (1,101.91 ha)
- Elevation: 7 feet (2.1 m)
- Established: 1965
- Administrator: Delaware Department of Natural Resources and Environmental Control
- Website: Official website

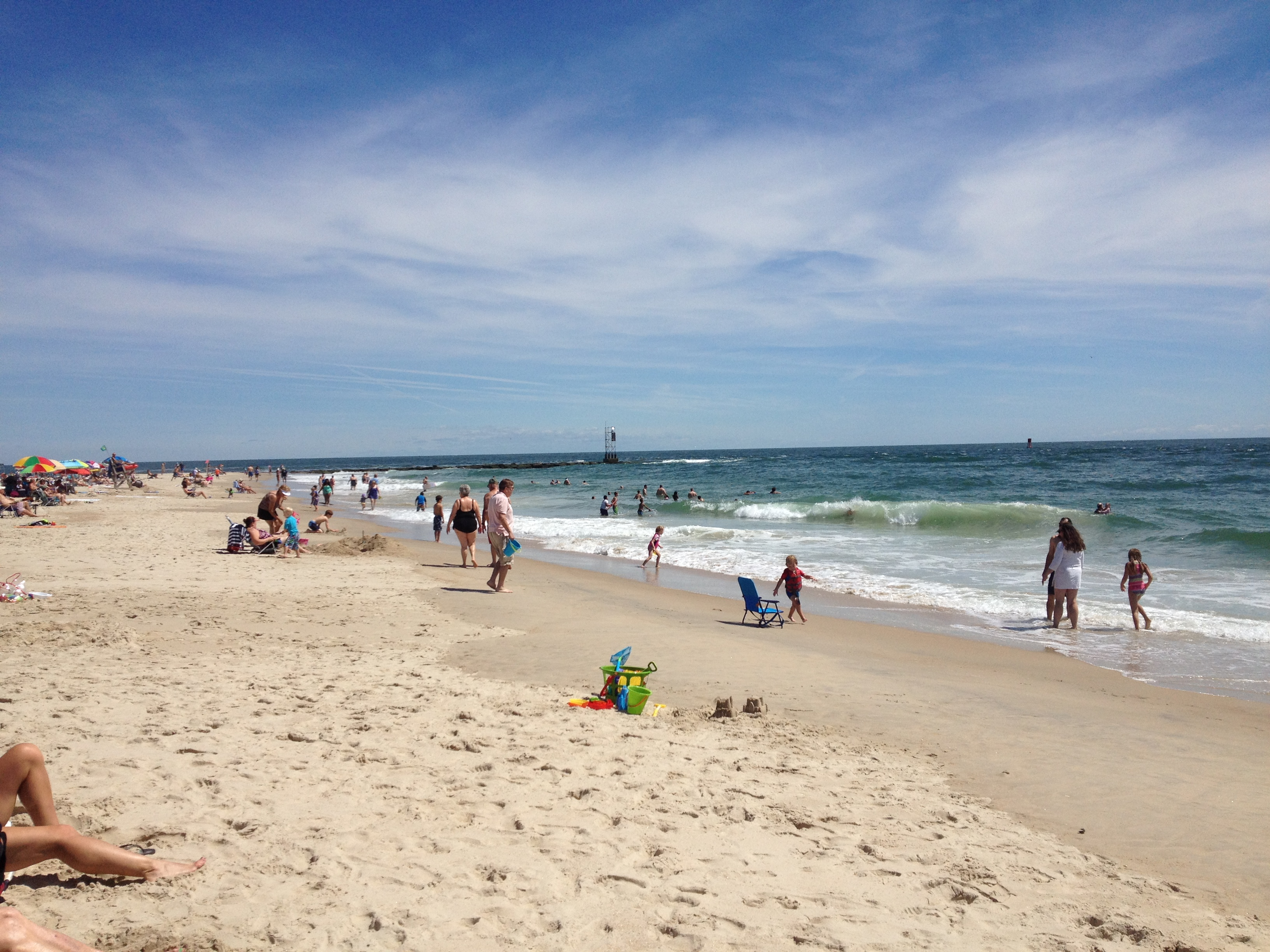
Beach at Indian River Inlet

Delaware Seashore State Park is a public recreation area located near Dewey Beach in Delaware, United States. It is bounded on the east by the Atlantic Ocean and on the west by Rehoboth Bay and Indian River Bay. The park covers 2,722 acres (1,102 ha). It is a major attraction for millions of visitors who come to the Delaware Beaches for water-related activities. Delaware Seashore State Park was created in 1965.

== History ==
The land in Delaware Seashore State Park saw frequent natural changes in the location of the inlet between the inland bays and the Atlantic Ocean. As a result, it was difficult to travel across this stretch of land. In 1939, two jetties were built to stabilize the Indian River Inlet at its present location. Indian River State Park was created by the State Park Commission in 1965, with the name becoming Delaware Seashore State Park in 1967. In 1966, the strip of land between the Little Assawoman Bay to the west and the Atlantic Ocean to the east between South Bethany and Fenwick Island became a separate southern portion of the park. In 1981, the southern section of Delaware Seashore State Park became Fenwick Island State Park.

The Indian River Life-Saving Station was built in 1876 by the United States Life-Saving Service in order to respond to shipwrecks along the Delaware coast. The station is listed on the National Register of Historic Places and is open to the public.

== Recreation ==
Delaware Seashore State Park has 6 miles (9.7 km) of shoreline along the Atlantic Ocean, Rehoboth Bay, and Indian River Bay. The park offers swimming and sunbathing at two ocean swimming areas, which have bathhouses that offer showers and changing rooms, concession stands, and rental of umbrellas, chairs, and rafts.

Fishing and boating are also popular at Delaware Seashore State Park. The park offers surf fishing along the ocean and angling at Indian River Inlet. The park has several dune crossings that allow four-wheel vehicles to access the beach for surf fishing. The state park is also home to the Indian River Marina, located on the north side of the Indian River Inlet.

Delaware Seashore State Park offers a beach for surfing to the north of the Indian River Inlet. The inland bays offer windsurfing and sailing. A boat launch allows access to the bay for boaters. Some areas of the bays allow clamming and crabbing. The park has a nature trail on Burton's Island that offers view of salt marshes and bay islands. The park has two picnic pavilions.

Delaware Seashore State Park offers camping for both tents and recreational vehicles.

Preceded by Indian Beach	Beaches of Delmarva	Succeeded by Sussex Shores
