= Dewey Beach, Delaware =

- Town
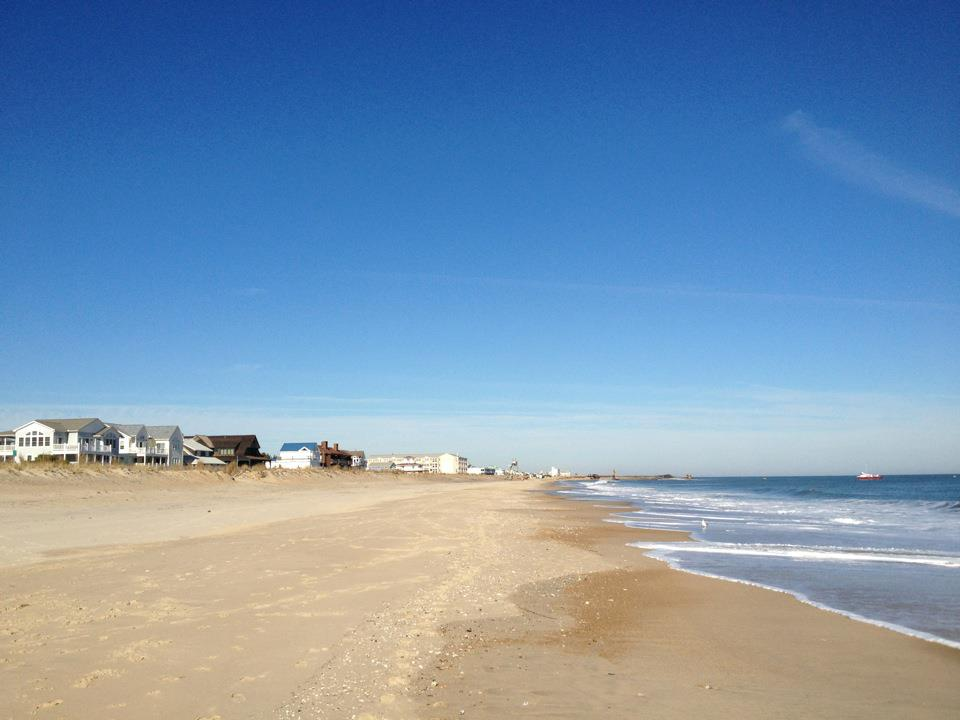

- Flag Seal
- Motto: Dewey Beach, A Way of Life
- Location of Dewey Beach in Sussex County, Delaware.

- Location within the state of Delaware Dewey Beach (the United States)
- Coordinates: 38°41′34″N 75°04′29″W
- Country: United States
- State: Delaware
- County: Sussex
- Incorporated: 1981

Government
  - Type: Mayor-council
  - Mayor: Bill Stevens

Area
  - Total: 0.33 sq mi (0.86 km^{2})
  - Land: 0.33 sq mi (0.86 km^{2})
  - Water: 0 sq mi (0.00 km^{2})
- Elevation: 7 ft (2.1 m)

Population (2020)
  - Total: 353
  - Density: 1,067.3/sq mi (412.07/km^{2})
- Time zone: UTC−5 (Eastern (EST))
  - Summer (DST): UTC−4 (EDT)
- ZIP code: 19971
- Area code: 302
- FIPS code: 10-20900
- GNIS feature ID: 213884
- Website: www.townofdeweybeach.gov

Dewey Beach is an incorporated coastal town in eastern Sussex County, Delaware, United States. As of the 2020 census, Dewey Beach had a population of 353. It is part of the rapidly growing Cape Region and lies within the Salisbury, Maryland-Delaware Metropolitan Statistical Area. In 2011, the NRDC awarded Dewey Beach with a 5-Star rating in water quality. This award was given only to 12 other locations, one being neighboring Rehoboth Beach. Out of the 30 states with coastline, the Delaware Beaches ranked number 1 in water quality in 2011.

== History ==
In 1868, "Rehoboth City" first appeared on a map of Lewes Rehoboth Hundred in Beer's Atlas of Delaware. It is believed that the name was changed to Dewey Beach following the 1898 Battle of Manila (Spanish–American War) when Admiral George Dewey became a national hero. Dewey Beach was incorporated in 1981.

The Rehoboth Beach Life-Saving Station (RBLSS), located at the end of Dagsworthy Street, was commissioned in 1878. It became the Rehoboth Beach Coast Guard Station (RBCGS) in 1915. In 1921 citizens objected to the closing of the station, and it was recommissioned in 1926. The station was decommissioned in 1937 and abandoned in 1946. The original structure was moved to Lewes and became a residence. A replica of the station was built in 1988 which stands today.

== Tourism ==
Dewey Beach lies on a small strip of land between the Atlantic Ocean and Rehoboth Bay and is about one mile long and two blocks wide. Despite its small size and low year-round population of about 300, it is not uncommon for 30,000 to descend upon the town during summer weekends. Numerous bars and restaurants line Coastal Highway (Delaware Route 1), the town's main street.

While it has a reputation as a magnet for partygoers in the summer months, Dewey Beach is also a popular family resort spot, particularly because of its wide, sandy beaches, and many hotels, cottages, and condominiums.

As is the case with most beach areas, Dewey Beach quiets down in the off season.

The town hosts the Dewey Beach Music Conference during the last weekend of September. This event began in 2002 and has been a huge draw for unsigned bands from all over the country.

Another popular Dewey Beach event, which occurs every Columbus Day weekend in October, is Greyhounds Reach The Beach, where thousands of rescued greyhounds and their owners congregate.

Also, the town is the location of the annual East Coast Skimboarding Championships, in mid-August.

In June, recently graduated high school seniors come to Dewey Beach for Senior Week.

Dewey Beach is also a well-known skimboarding destination. Since 2013, it has hosted a stop on the United Skim Tour.

== Geography ==
Dewey Beach is located at 38°41′34″N 75°04′29″W (38.6928899, –75.0746249).

According to the United States Census Bureau, the town has a total area of 0.3 square miles (0.78 km^{2}), all land.

=== Climate ===
The climate in this area is characterized by hot, humid summers and generally mild to cool winters. According to the Köppen Climate Classification system, Dewey Beach has a humid subtropical climate, abbreviated "Cfa" on climate maps.

Climate data for Dewey Beach, Delaware
Month	Jan	Feb	Mar	Apr	May	Jun	Jul	Aug	Sep	Oct	Nov	Dec	Year
Record high °F (°C)	78 (26)	86 (30)	89 (32)	92 (33)	97 (36)	102 (39)	101 (38)	101 (38)	98 (37)	92 (33)	88 (31)	77 (25)	102 (39)
Mean daily maximum °F (°C)	45 (7)	48 (9)	55 (13)	65 (18)	74 (23)	83 (28)	87 (31)	85 (29)	79 (26)	69 (21)	59 (15)	49 (9)	67 (19)
Mean daily minimum °F (°C)	30 (−1)	31 (−1)	37 (3)	46 (8)	55 (13)	65 (18)	70 (21)	69 (21)	63 (17)	52 (11)	43 (6)	34 (1)	50 (10)
Record low °F (°C)	−11 (−24)	0 (−18)	9 (−13)	18 (−8)	32 (0)	40 (4)	47 (8)	47 (8)	37 (3)	26 (−3)	16 (−9)	0 (−18)	−11 (−24)
Average precipitation inches (mm)	3.62 (92)	3.23 (82)	4.40 (112)	3.59 (91)	3.72 (94)	3.39 (86)	4.78 (121)	4.73 (120)	4.04 (103)	3.94 (100)	3.66 (93)	3.85 (98)	46.95 (1,192)
Source: The Weather Channel

== Infrastructure ==
=== Transportation ===
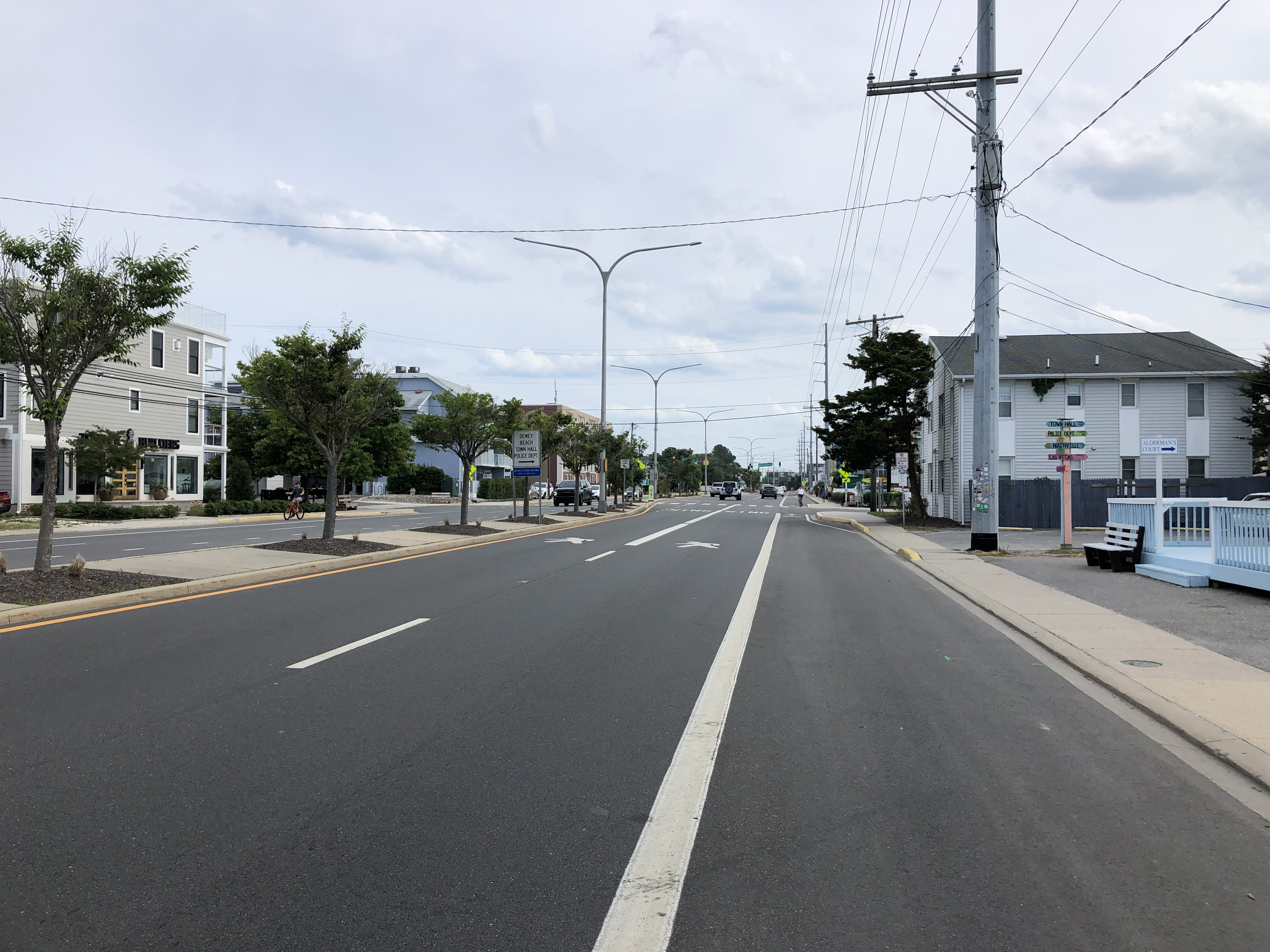
DE 1 southbound in Dewey Beach

Delaware Route 1 (Coastal Highway) serves as the main north–south road in Dewey Beach, heading south along the coast and across the Indian River Inlet Bridge toward Bethany Beach, Fenwick Island, and Ocean City, Maryland and turning northwest to provide access from inland points. Delaware Route 1A (King Charles Avenue) begins at DE 1 in Dewey Beach and heads north into Rehoboth Beach. Between May 15 and September 15, all parking in Dewey Beach is regulated by parking meters or parking permits.

DART First State provides bus service to Dewey Beach in the summer months along Beach Bus Route 208, which heads north to the Rehoboth Beach Park and Ride and the Lewes Transit Center Park and Ride near Lewes and south to the 144th Street Transit Center in Ocean City, Maryland to connect to Ocean City Transportation's Coastal Highway Beach Bus. The route provides connections to other Beach Bus routes and the Route 305 bus from Wilmington at the park and ride lots in Rehoboth Beach and Lewes.

The Jolly Trolley is a private shuttle service that provides frequent transport in Dewey Beach and to neighboring Rehoboth Beach. The service operates daily through the summer tourist season between Memorial Day weekend and Labor Day and on weekends in the shoulder season before Memorial Day and after Labor Day.

BestBus offers intercity bus service to Dewey Beach from Washington Union Station and Dupont Circle in Washington, D.C., and 34th Street in the Midtown Manhattan section of New York City on weekends in the summer months.

Cape Water Tours & Taxi operates a round-trip water taxi service to Dewey Beach from Lewes via the Lewes and Rehoboth Canal on Friday evenings in the summer months, offering access to dining and nightlife in Dewey Beach.

=== Utilities ===
Delmarva Power, a subsidiary of Exelon, provides electricity to Dewey Beach. Sussex County operates the Dewey Beach Water District, which provides water service to the town, and the Dewey Beach Sanitary Sewer District, which provides sewer service to the town. Trash and recycling collection in Dewey Beach is provided under contract by Waste Industries.

== Demographics ==
Historical population
Census	Pop.	Note	%±
1990	204		—
2000	301		47.5%
2010	341		13.3%
2020	353		3.5%
U.S. Decennial Census

As of the census of 2000, there were 301 people, 161 households, and 83 families residing in the town. The population density was 876.6 inhabitants per square mile (338.5/km^{2}). There were 1,369 housing units at an average density of 3,986.9 per square mile (1,539.4/km^{2}). The racial makeup of the town was 91.69% White, 0.33% African American, 0.33% Native American, 3.65% Asian, 2.66% from other races, and 1.33% from two or more races. Hispanic or Latino of any race were 5.32% of the population.

There were 161 households, out of which 9.3% had children under the age of 18 living with them, 44.1% were married couples living together, 5.6% had a female householder with no husband present, and 48.4% were non-families. 40.4% of all households were made up of individuals, and 13.0% had someone living alone who was 65 years of age or older. The average household size was 1.87 and the average family size was 2.45.

In the town, the population was spread out, with 8.3% under the age of 18, 5.6% from 18 to 24, 23.3% from 25 to 44, 34.6% from 45 to 64, and 28.2% who were 65 years of age or older. The median age was 52 years. For every 100 females, there were 106.2 males. For every 100 females age 18 and over, there were 110.7 males.

The median income for a household in the town was $79,471, and the median income for a family was $97,505. Males had a median income of $56,563 versus $39,583 for females. The per capita income for the town was $51,958. None of the families and 1.9% of the population were living below the poverty line, including no under eighteen and 5.8% of those over 64.

== Government ==
Dewey Beach is governed by a Town Council and Mayor. As of 2021, the town's mayor is Bill Stevens

The Town has a full-time police force, whose command staff consists of the Chief of Police and a Lieutenant (assistant chief of police). The department has no "special units" as do some large agencies, but it does have two officers, a sergeant and a corporal, who are qualified as motorcycle officers. In addition, the department is one of only a few in the state to have a full-time communications center (dispatch).

During high-activity periods, the department is augmented by additional police officers who are commissioned for those times, such as the summer. Those officers are fully certified police officers who have the same police authority as year-round officers.

In July 2017, a 73-page lawsuit, which has Town Manager Marc Applebaum, Dewey Beach mayor Dale H. Cooke and commissioners, and Town Solicitor Frederick Townsend listed as defendants, accuses Applebaum of racial discrimination, sexual discrimination, hostile work environment, improper interference with the police department, improper interference with building inspector, improper interference with the beach patrol and improper interference with the Alderman Court.

During the investigation, Marc Appelbaum remained on staff. In August 2017, several bags were shredded and left in dumpsters at locations away from the town hall. Even though several of the accusations were found true and staff intimidation was prevalent, the Town of Dewey Beach separated from Marc Appelbaum. Marc Appelbaum ended up getting $100,000 plus the rest of his salary he would have earned up to March 11, 2018.

== Education ==
Dewey Beach is in the Cape Henlopen School District. It is zoned to Rehoboth Elementary School. Cape Henlopen High School in Lewes is the sole comprehensive high school of the district.

Preceded by Rehoboth Beach	Beaches of Delmarva	Succeeded by Indian Beach
