= Bethany Beach, Delaware =

- Town
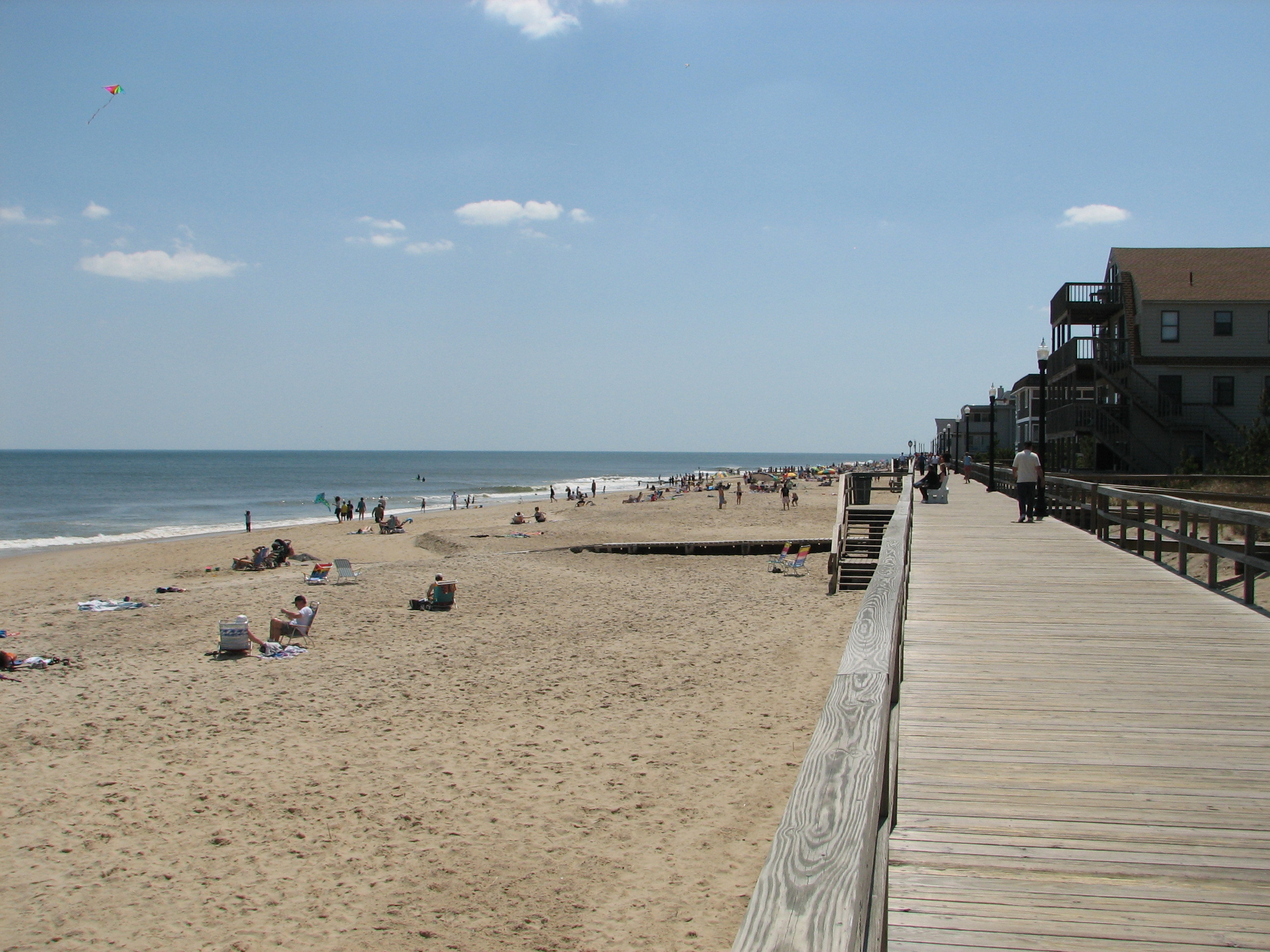
- The Bethany Beach boardwalk in April 2006, prior to the 2008–09 construction of a new dune between it and the Atlantic Ocean.

- Flag Seal

- Location of Bethany Beach in Sussex County, Delaware.

- Location within the state of Delaware Bethany Beach (the United States)
- Coordinates: 38°32′22″N 75°03′19″W
- Country: United States
- State: Delaware
- County: Sussex
- Incorporated: July 1, 1901 (founded), 1909 (incorporated)

Government
  - Type: Council-manager
  - Mayor: Ron Calef

Area
  - Total: 1.16 sq mi (3.01 km^{2})
  - Land: 1.15 sq mi (2.97 km^{2})
  - Water: 0.015 sq mi (0.04 km^{2})
- Elevation: 7 ft (2.1 m)

Population (2020)
  - Total: 954
  - Density: 830.8/sq mi (320.78/km^{2})
- Time zone: UTC−5 (Eastern (EST))
  - Summer (DST): UTC−4 (EDT)
- ZIP code: 19930
- Area code: 302
- FIPS code: 10-05690
- GNIS feature ID: 213638
- Website: www.townofbethanybeach.com

Bethany Beach is an incorporated town in Sussex County, Delaware, United States. As of the 2020 census, Bethany Beach had a population of 954. However, during the summer months some 15,000 more populate the town as vacationers. It is part of the Salisbury, MD-DE Metropolitan Statistical Area.

Bethany Beach, South Bethany and Fenwick Island are popularly known as "The Quiet Resorts". Contributing to Bethany Beach's reputation as a "quiet" place is the presence of Delaware Seashore State Park immediately to the north of the town.

Despite its small size, Bethany Beach contains the usual attractions of a summer seaside resort, including the short Joseph Olson Boardwalk, a broad, sandy beach, motels, restaurants, and vacation homes. Because Bethany Beach does not sit on a barrier island, residential areas continue some distance to the west of the town's limits.

== Geography ==
Bethany Beach is located at 38°32′22″N 75°03′19″W (38.5395564, −75.0551807). The town is bordered to the north by the Delaware Seashore State Park and by Salt Pond, to the east by the Atlantic Ocean, to the south by South Bethany, and to the west by Ocean View.

According to the United States Census Bureau, the town has a total area of 1.2 square miles (3.1 km^{2}), of which 1.1 square miles (2.8 km^{2}) is land and 0.04 square miles (0.10 km^{2}) (1.71%) is water.

=== Beaches ===
The town is bordered to the east completely by free public beaches, all guarded seasonally by professional lifeguards known as the Bethany Beach Patrol (or The Bumblebees). The beach patrol, which consists of 30 members, is on duty daily from Memorial Day weekend to Labor Day and on weekends in September. Just south of the town limits, there is a half-mile area of private beachfront owned by Sea Colony.

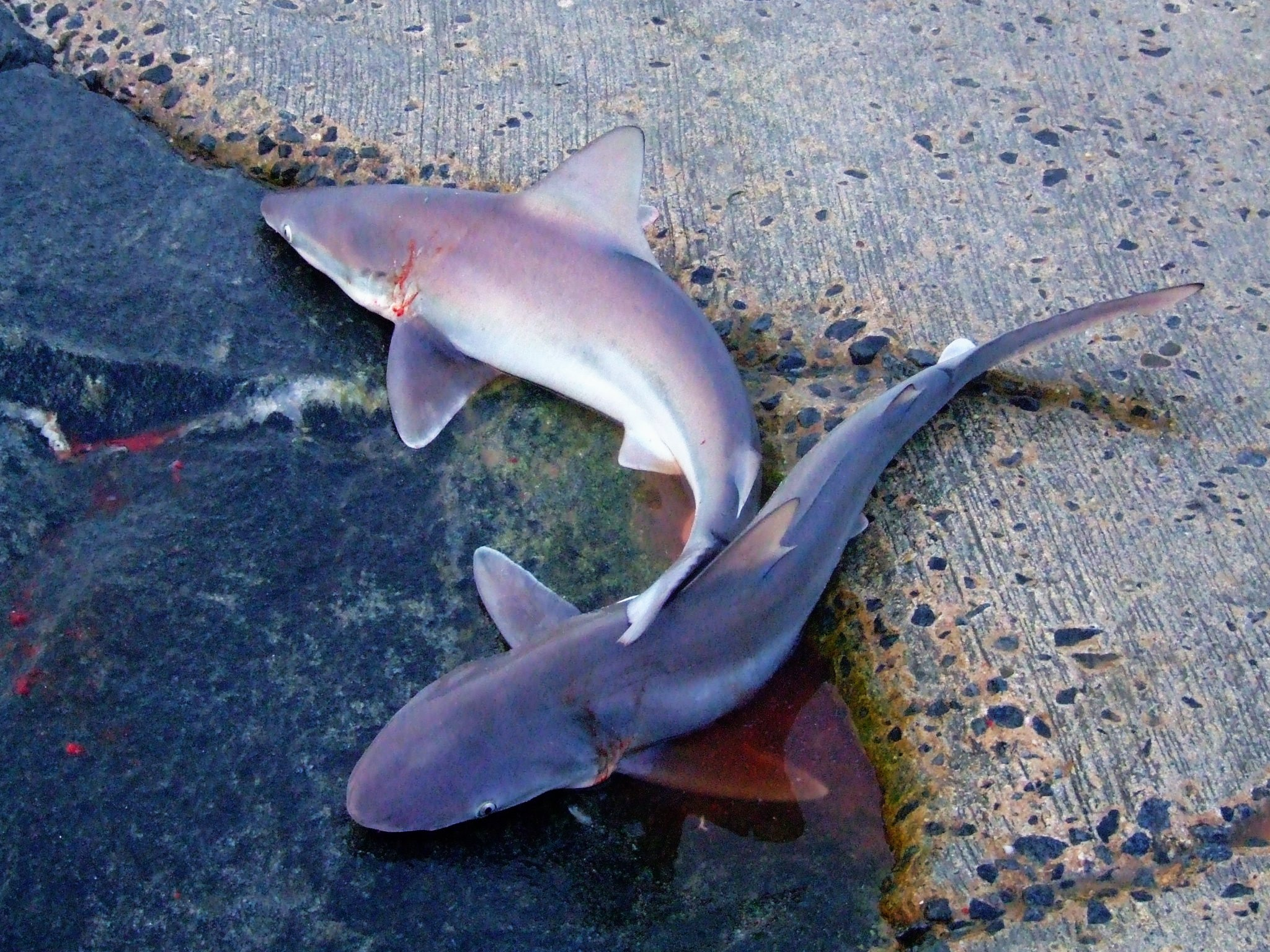
Bethany Beach contains many forms of wildlife, including sand sharks

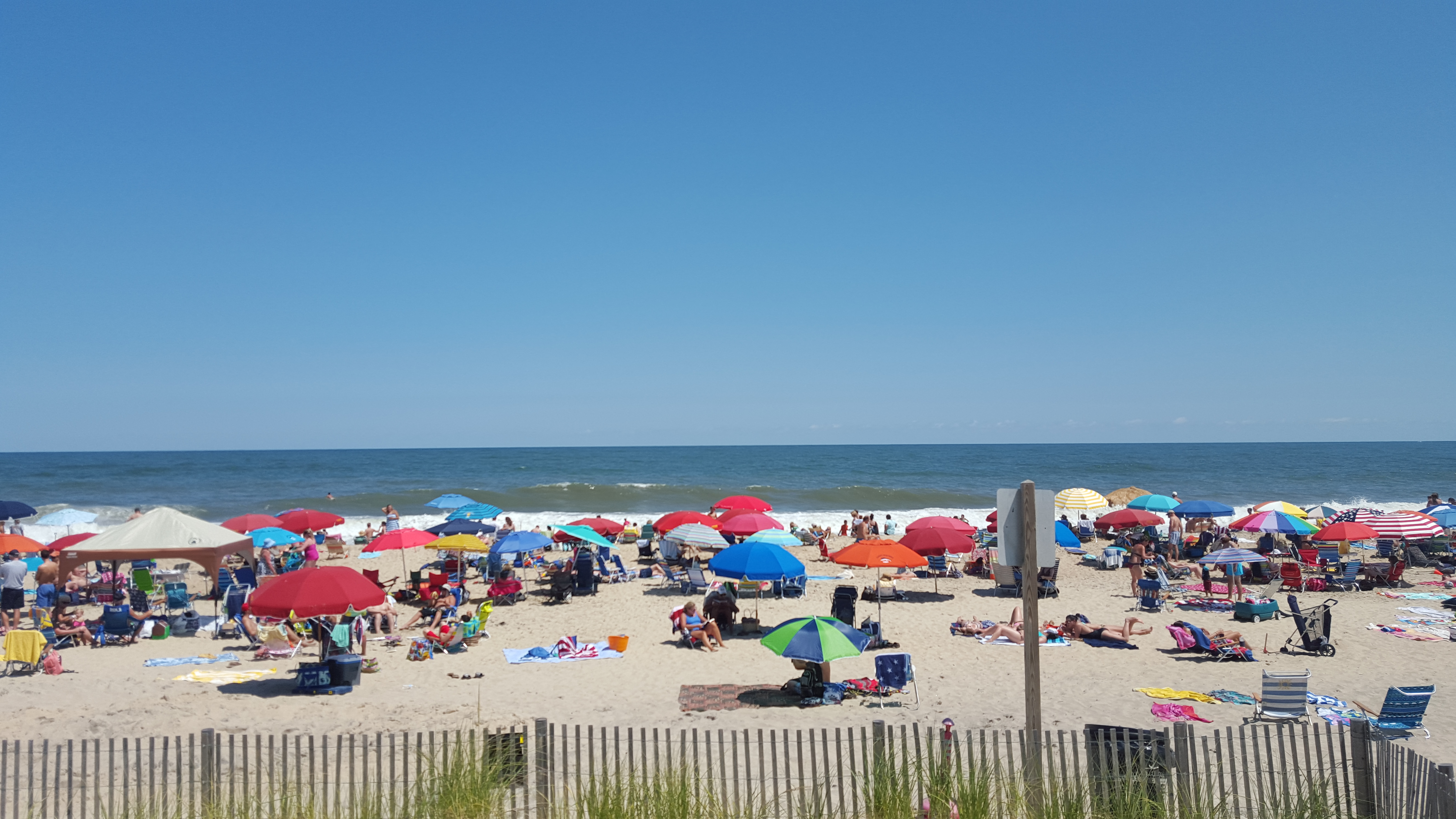
A view of the beach in Bethany Beach

=== Climate ===
The climate in this area is characterized by hot, humid summers and generally mild to cool winters. According to the Köppen Climate Classification system, Bethany Beach has a humid subtropical climate, abbreviated "Cfa" on climate maps.

Climate data for Bethany Beach, Delaware
Month	Jan	Feb	Mar	Apr	May	Jun	Jul	Aug	Sep	Oct	Nov	Dec	Year
Mean daily maximum °F (°C)	44.6 (7.0)	46.2 (7.9)	52.2 (11.2)	62.5 (16.9)	71.1 (21.7)	80.1 (26.7)	85.3 (29.6)	83.5 (28.6)	78.1 (25.6)	68.3 (20.2)	57.7 (14.3)	49.2 (9.6)	64.9 (18.3)
Mean daily minimum °F (°C)	29.6 (−1.3)	30.7 (−0.7)	37 (3)	46.1 (7.8)	55.5 (13.1)	64.9 (18.3)	70.2 (21.2)	68.7 (20.4)	63.3 (17.4)	51.9 (11.1)	41 (5)	34.3 (1.3)	49.4 (9.7)
Average precipitation inches (mm)	3.52 (89)	3.07 (78)	4.26 (108)	3.53 (90)	3.69 (94)	3.67 (93)	4.36 (111)	4.68 (119)	4.32 (110)	4.45 (113)	3.43 (87)	4.18 (106)	47.17 (1,198)
Source: PRISM

=== Communities ===
- Cotton Patch Hills

== Demographics ==
Historical population
Census	Pop.	Note	%±
1910	56		—
1920	56		0.0%
1930	118		110.7%
1940	152		28.8%
1950	190		25.0%
1960	170		−10.5%
1970	189		11.2%
1980	330		74.6%
1990	326		−1.2%
2000	903		177.0%
2010	1,060		17.4%
2020	954		−10.0%
U.S. Decennial Census

As of the census of 2000, there were 903 people, 473 households, and 281 families residing in the town. The population density was 782.4 inhabitants per square mile (302.1/km^{2}). There were 2,376 housing units at an average density of 2,058.6 per square mile (794.8/km^{2}). The racial makeup of the town was 97.90% White, 0.78% African American, 0.11% Native American, 0.22% Asian, and 1.00% from two or more races. Hispanic or Latino of any race were 1.33% of the population.

There were 473 households, out of which 10.1% had children under the age of 18 living with them, 53.1% were married couples living together, 4.9% had a female householder with no husband present, and 40.4% were non-families. 35.7% of all households were made up of individuals, and 17.8% had someone living alone who was 65 years of age or older. The average household size was 1.91 and the average family size was 2.40.

The age distribution is 10.3% under the age of 18, 3.4% from 18 to 24, 15.6% from 25 to 44, 31.5% from 45 to 64, and 39.2% who are 65 years of age or older. The median age is 59 years. For every 100 females, there are 89.3 males. For every 100 females age 18 and over, there are 88.8 males.

The median income for a household in the town is $51,875, and the median income for a family is $67,500. Males have a median income of $41,705 versus $35,909 for females. The per capita income for the town is $41,306. About 2.9% of families and 4.7% of the population are below the poverty line, including 9.6% of those under age 18 and 1.6% of those age 65 or over.

The beach is extremely popular in the summer making it difficult to get a spot on sunny summer days. Bethany Beach is known as a "family beach" as there are not as many bars or other college student attractions.

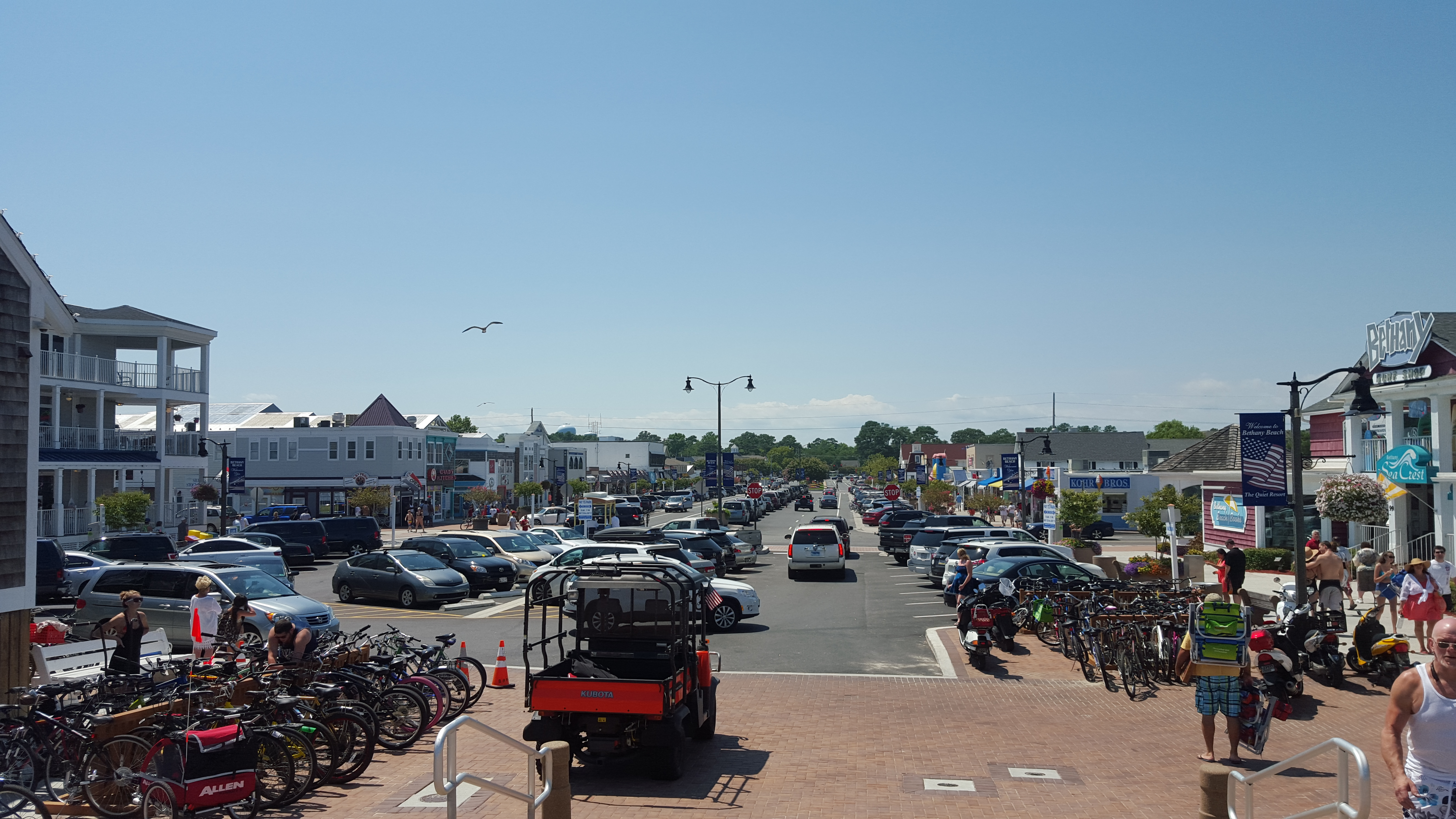
Garfield Parkway in downtown Bethany Beach

== Government ==
=== City council and mayor ===
Bethany Beach is governed by a city council made up of seven resident and non-resident property owners elected to two-year terms. One of them serves as Council President and is considered the mayor of the town. None of the council members are paid. The council tends to err on the side of tradition in governing the town and seeks to maintain Bethany Beach's "Quiet Resort" atmosphere and reputation.

==== Mayors of Bethany Beach ====
Also referred to as Council President:

- 1923–1926 George Townsend
- 1926–1927 John W. Ellis
- 1927–1930 Walter S. Ringler
- 1930–1937 Ebe T. Chandler
- 1937–1938 Carroll R. Jaggar
- 1938–1939 William P. Short Sr.
- 1939–1940 Walter G. Moyle
- 1940–1945 William P. Short Sr.
- 1945–1948 William F. Wilgus
- 1948–1949 James B. Rutter
- 1949–1953 Horace J. VanAuken
- 1953–1954 Edison Gray
- 1954–1956 Charles L. Martin Jr.
- 1956–1960 James Whaley
- 1960–1966 James C. Popham
- 1966–1970 Martin T. Wiegand
- 1970–1971 Ralph K. Graves
- 1971–1972 Tilton D. McNeal
- 1972–1973 William J. Collins
- 1973–1974 Louis Brilliant
- 1974–1977 Sidney A. Bennett
- 1977–1978 Robert C. Maxwell
- 1978–1981 Vernon H. Dibeler
- 1981–1982 William J. Collins
- 1982–1983 Millard P. Rummel
- 1983–1984 Jesse A. Rawley Jr.
- 1984–1991 Dr. Robert Parsons
- 1991–1997 Charles J. Bartlett
- 1997–2005 Joseph F. McHugh
- 2005–2006 Jack Walsh
- 2006–2008 Carol Olmstead
- 2008–2014 Tony McClenny
- 2014–2018 Jack Gordon
- 2018-Present Ron Calef

=== Alderman's Court ===
The town's Alderman's Court consists of two appointed judges. They adjudicate violations of town ordinances.

=== Police department ===
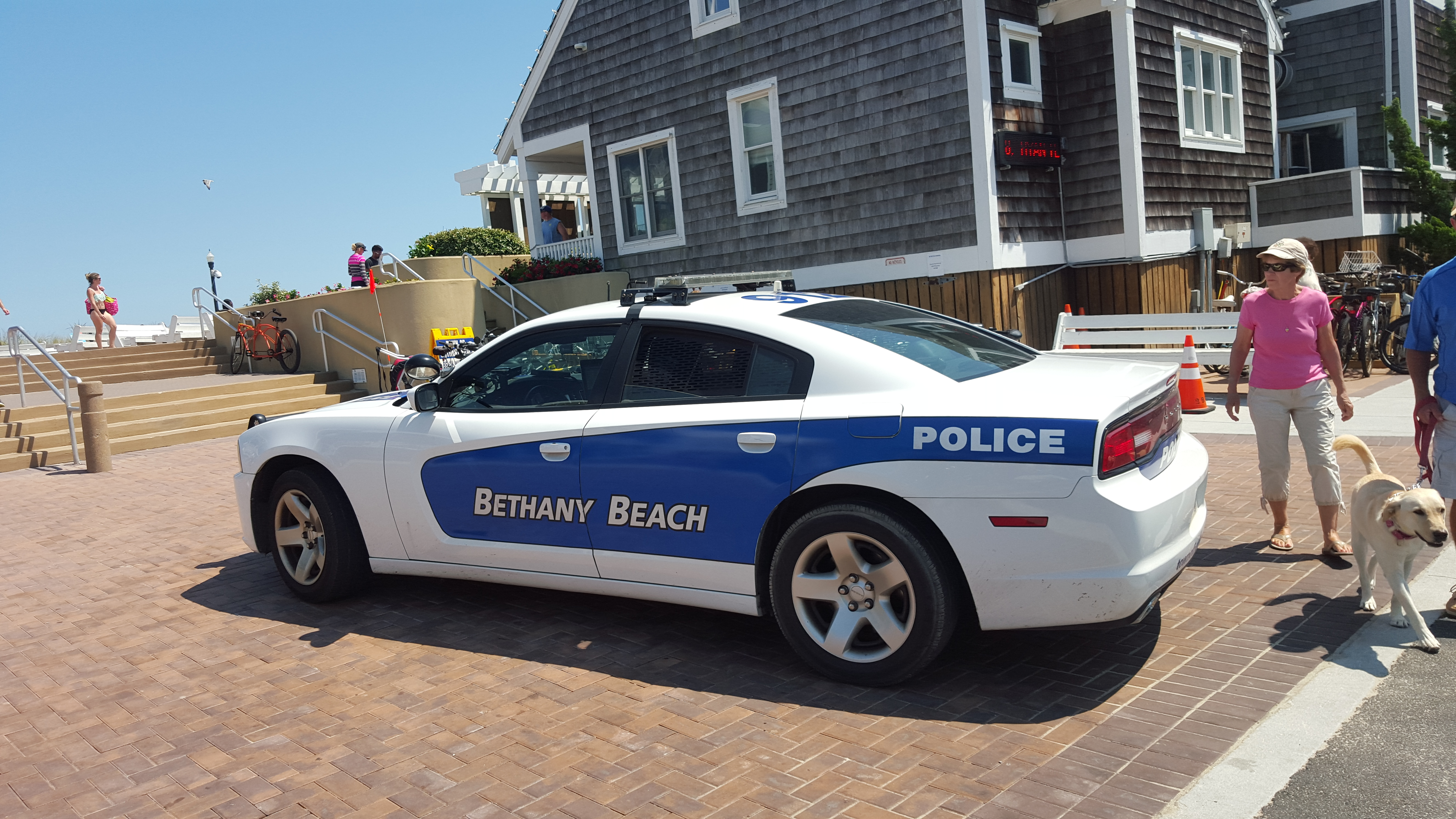
Bethany Beach Police Department car

The Bethany Beach Police Department has a staff of nine full-time officers. During the summer, it also employs 15 to 17 seasonal officers, some of them college students in training. The department operates seven cars, five of them patrol cars, and once won a national award from Law and Order magazine for the design of its patrol cars. The police department maintains a low-key but highly visible presence.

In 2024, Police Chief Michael Redmon and Captain Darin Cathell were dismissed after an audit determined that both had stolen a combined $150,000 for overtime shifts that did not exist.

=== Fire department ===
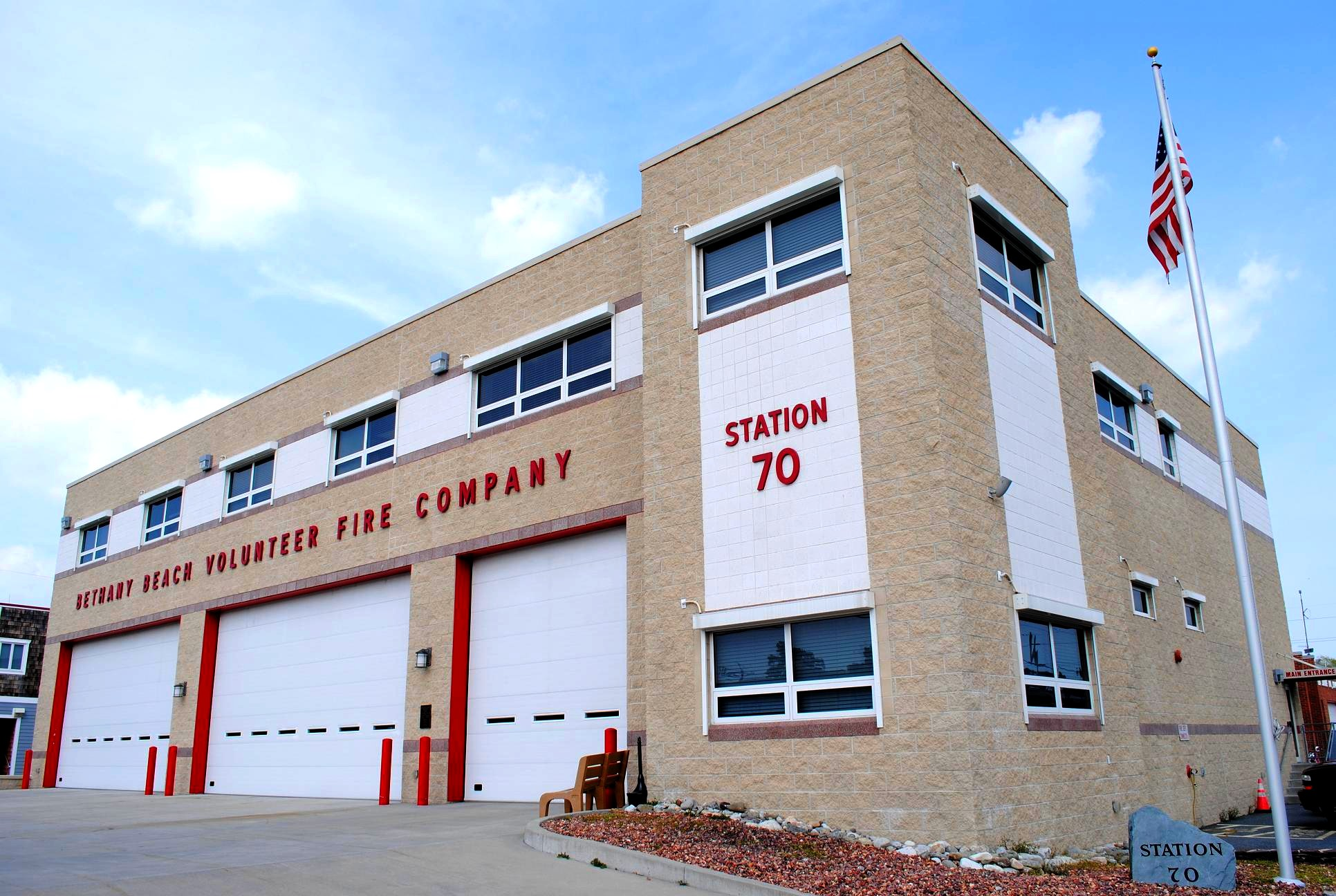
The Bethany Beach Volunteer Fire Department Company

The Bethany Beach Fire Department is a combination fire department that operates two quints, two engines, a rescue pumper, an aerial unit, a brush truck, three ambulances, and multiple other utility pieces.

The fire department serves the entire area south of Indian River Inlet, east of the Assawoman Canal, and north of the Maryland state line at the southern edge of Fenwick Island, Delaware. It has a fire station in Bethany Beach and a substation in Fenwick Island and offers an emergency medical center, operated for it by the Beebe Medical Center of Lewes, Delaware. It cooperates fully with the fire departments of Dagsboro, Frankford, Millville, Rehoboth Beach, Roxana, and Selbyville, Delaware, and Ocean City, Maryland.

The fire department was formed in June 1948 with ten members. It received its first equipment, a single used pumper, later that summer and answered its first call in September 1948. The town purchased property for its fire station in 1949, and the fire department held its first bingo game in March 1957. Its emergency medical center opened in the early 1980s, and its Fenwick Island substation began operations in July 1987.

== Infrastructure ==
=== Transportation ===
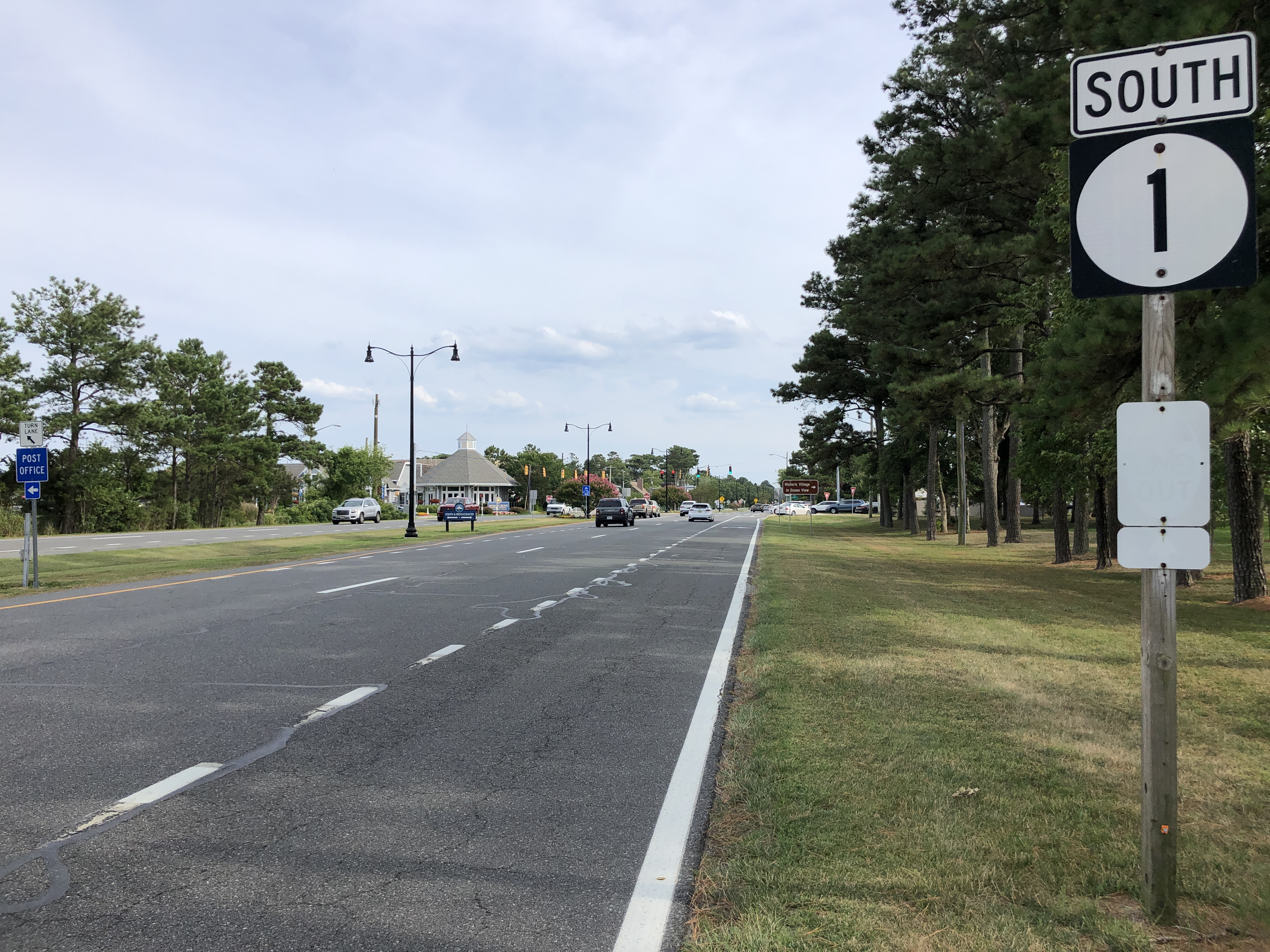
DE 1 southbound in Bethany Beach

The main north–south road in Bethany Beach is Delaware Route 1 (Coastal Highway). This route runs north along the coast through Delaware Seashore State Park, crossing the Indian River Inlet on the Indian River Inlet Bridge, toward Rehoboth Beach, and south along the coast toward Ocean City, Maryland. The main east–west road in Bethany Beach is Delaware Route 26 (Garfield Parkway), which provides access from inland towns to the west such as Ocean View, Millville, and Dagsboro. There are a total of 1,000 public parking spaces in the beach and downtown areas of Bethany Beach, with parking meters in effect or parking permits required between May 15 and September 15. Outside of the public parking spaces, residential parking permits are required on east–west streets between May 15 and September 15; these permits are only available to people who own property in Bethany Beach. Business parking permits are also available for business owners and their employees.

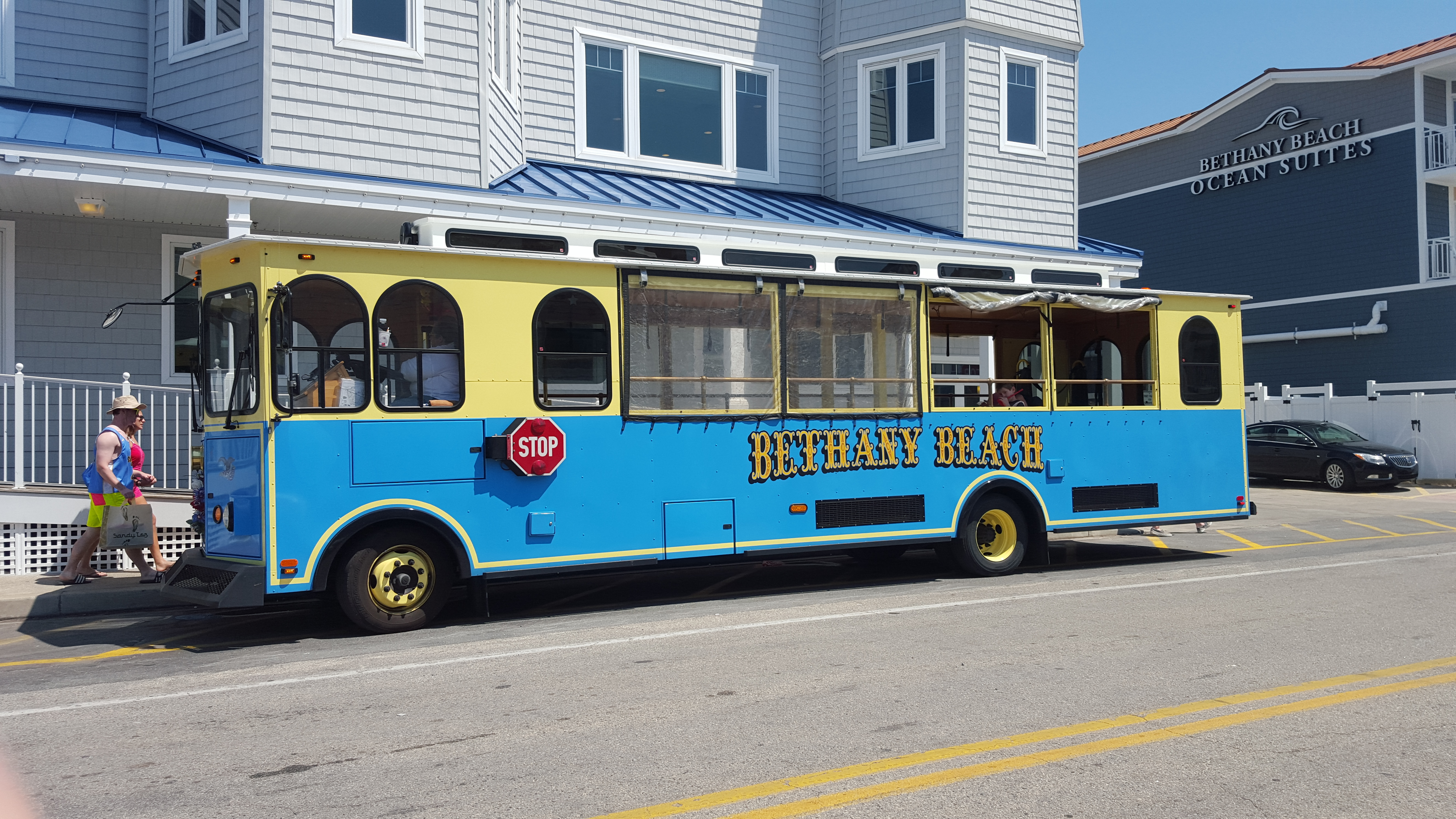
Bethany Beach Trolley

DART First State provides bus service to Bethany Beach in the summer months along Beach Bus Route 208, which heads north to the Rehoboth Beach Park and Ride and the Lewes Transit Center Park and Ride near Lewes to connect to other Beach Bus routes and the Route 305 bus from Wilmington and south to the 144th Street Transit Center in Ocean City, Maryland to connect to Ocean City Transportation's Coastal Highway Beach Bus.

The town operates the Bethany Beach Trolley along two routes between the beach area and the residential western section of the town between Memorial Day weekend and the middle of September. The North Trolley Route runs along Atlantic Avenue and west to the residential areas to the north of Garfield Parkway while the South Trolley Route runs along Atlantic Avenue and west to the residential areas to the south of Garfield Parkway.

=== Utilities ===
Delmarva Power, a subsidiary of Exelon, provides electricity to Bethany Beach. Chesapeake Utilities provides natural gas to the town. The Town of Bethany Beach Water Department provides water to the town, operating a water filtration plant and standpipe, six wells, and a distribution system. Sussex County operates the Bethany Beach Sanitary Sewer District, which provides sewer service to the town. The Town of Bethany Beach Public Works Department provides trash and recycling collection to the town.

== History ==
=== Before 1900 ===
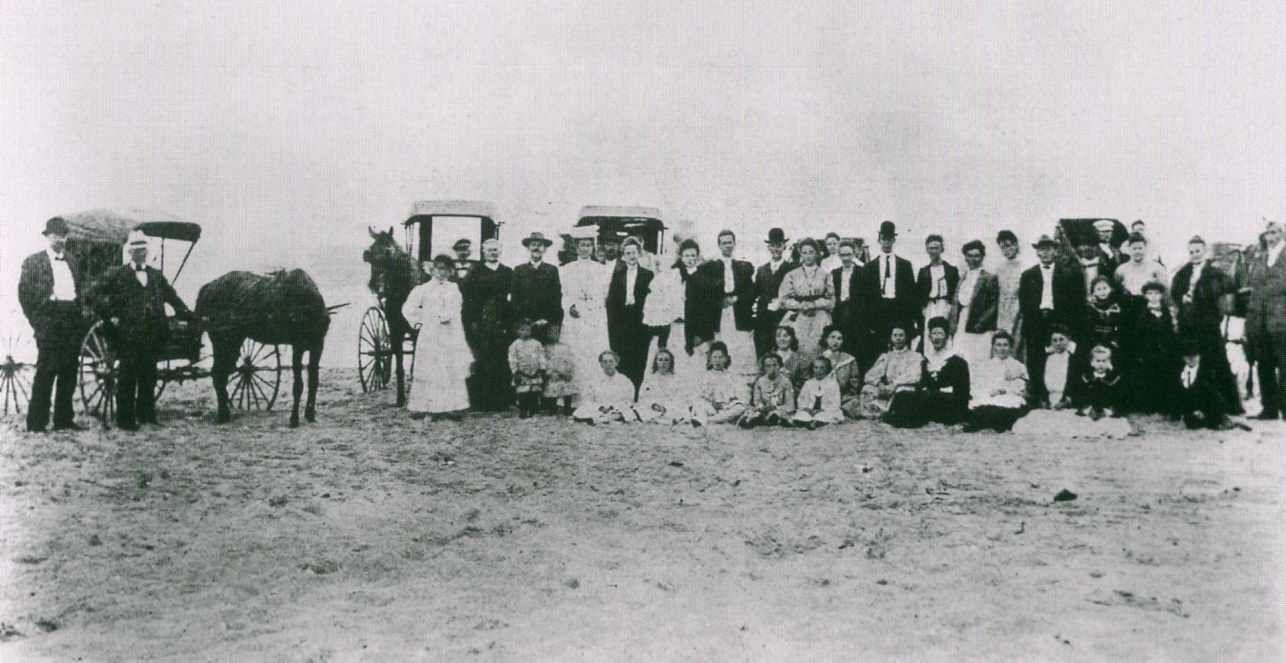
A church group from Ocean View, Delaware, at a fish fry along the uninhabited Atlantic coast east of Ocean View in 1880. Bethany Beach would be founded in this area 21 years later. This may be the first photograph ever taken of what was to become Bethany Beach.

There is a lack of evidence of Native American activity in the Bethany Beach area. Prior to the arrival of European settlers in North America, Native American settlements appear to have been limited to the area north of the Indian River, north of what is now Bethany Beach; even after Europeans pushed the Native Americans—mostly Nanticokes—out of their coastal settlements in the mid-17th century, the Native Americans moved west to settle around Oak Orchard, Delaware, and in the Millsboro, Delaware, area rather than south toward what would become Bethany Beach. However, Native Americans are known to have visited the bays and rivers of the Atlantic coast of Delaware during the summer to fish, and it is possible that this included visits to the Bethany Beach area.

Europeans also did not settle the area prior to 1900, probably because Indian River Inlet cut the area off from their settlements to the north and because the town of Ocean View, founded in 1889 and now Bethany Beach's neighbor to the west, did not expand its boundaries eastward toward the coast.

The portion of Delaware in which Bethany Beach lies was subject to a lengthy legal dispute as to whether the land belonged to the Province of Maryland or the Province of Pennsylvania, Penn vs. Baltimore, that broke out in 1683. While it dragged on, William Penn granted the Delaware Colony its own legislature in 1701, establishing it as a separate colony. The dispute over the boundaries of the three colonies was not resolved until 1759, when the parties to the dispute agreed that the area where Bethany Beach now lies was part of Delaware.

=== The founding of Bethany Beach ===
In 1898, F. D. Powers—a minister at the Vermont Avenue Christian Church (today the National City Christian Church), a congregation of the Disciples of Christ in Washington, D.C.—was serving as president of the annual convention of Washington-area Disciples when he suggested that a Christian meeting place be established on the Atlantic coast of the United States. He envisioned it as analogous to the Chatauqua adult-education summer-camp movement popular in the late 19th and early 20th centuries, and played a key role in selecting the site of what would become Bethany Beach. The Christian Missionary Society endorsed his idea in 1898 and established a committee to study the matter; under his leadership, it recommended the Delmarva Peninsula as a suitable location for such a settlement, and later selected the empty coastal area east of Ocean View owned by the Ocean View landowner Ezekiel Evans as the specific site for the community.

In 1900, the Disciples of Christ held a nationwide contest to name the proposed community, the winner to receive an oceanside lot there. A committee of three men from Scranton, Pennsylvania, was responsible for choosing a name from among the entries; although it considered the names "Wellington" and "Gladmere", it chose the name "Bethany Beach" suggested by H. L. Atkinson of the University of Chicago. Powers supposedly also suggested the name "Bethany Beach", but the committee received Powers' entry two weeks after Atkinson's and thus Atkinson was deemed the winner.

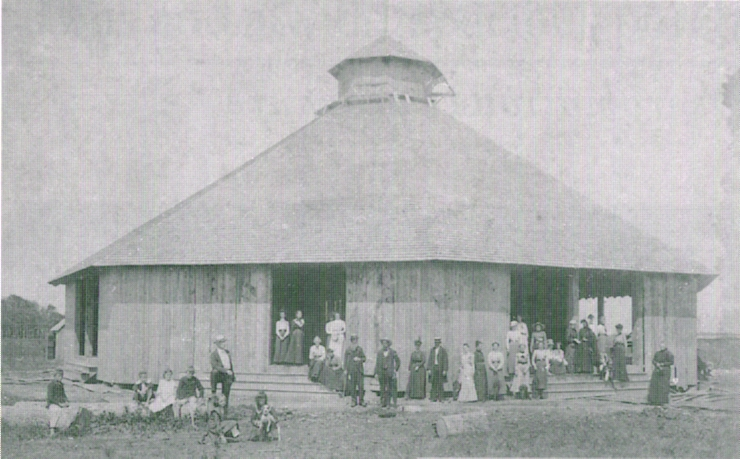
The original Tabernacle in its early years. It stood from 1903 to 1961, and served as Bethany Beach's auditorium and religious and cultural center.

Also in 1900, the Disciples of Christ formed the Bethany Beach Improvement Company, which raised the money to purchase the land for the new town from Evans. Marketing the new community aggressively, the company sold 150 lots in Bethany Beach, mostly to families from Washington, D.C., Pittsburgh, Pennsylvania, and Scranton. It laid out streets and began the construction of the Tabernacle, an octagonal auditorium which was dedicated on July 24, 1901, while still under construction and would serve as the town's central meeting place and cultural center, hosting both church services and entertainment events. The company also made plans to build cottages on the lots it had sold and to establish a railroad branch line passing through Ocean View and Millville that would connect Bethany Beach with the main line to the west at either Dagsboro or Frankford, Delaware, promising that the railroad would begin operations on July 4, 1901; however, the 1901 season came and went with no railroad in operation.

A temporary town government began to operate in 1901. This event is celebrated as the founding of Bethany Beach, although the town would not be incorporated for another eight years.

On July 12, 1901, Bethany Beach's inaugural summer season officially began with a crowd at the incomplete Tabernacle singing a song written especially for the occasion and sung to the tune of "Marching Through Georgia".

=== The financial crisis of 1902–1903 ===
Bethany Beach soon encountered financial problems which threatened to bring the planned town to an end almost before it could begin. Bankers in Georgetown, Delaware, hesitated to loan money for the development of Bethany Beach because they had lost money on the development of Rehoboth Beach to the north. Without sufficient financial backing, the Bethany Beach Improvement Company was unable to act on its plans, and little development occurred in Bethany Beach; basic services were lacking, construction stalled, work on the hoped-for railroad never began, and there was little agreement on how to address the new community's problems. In May 1902 the Christian Missionary Society withdrew its endorsement of Bethany Beach.

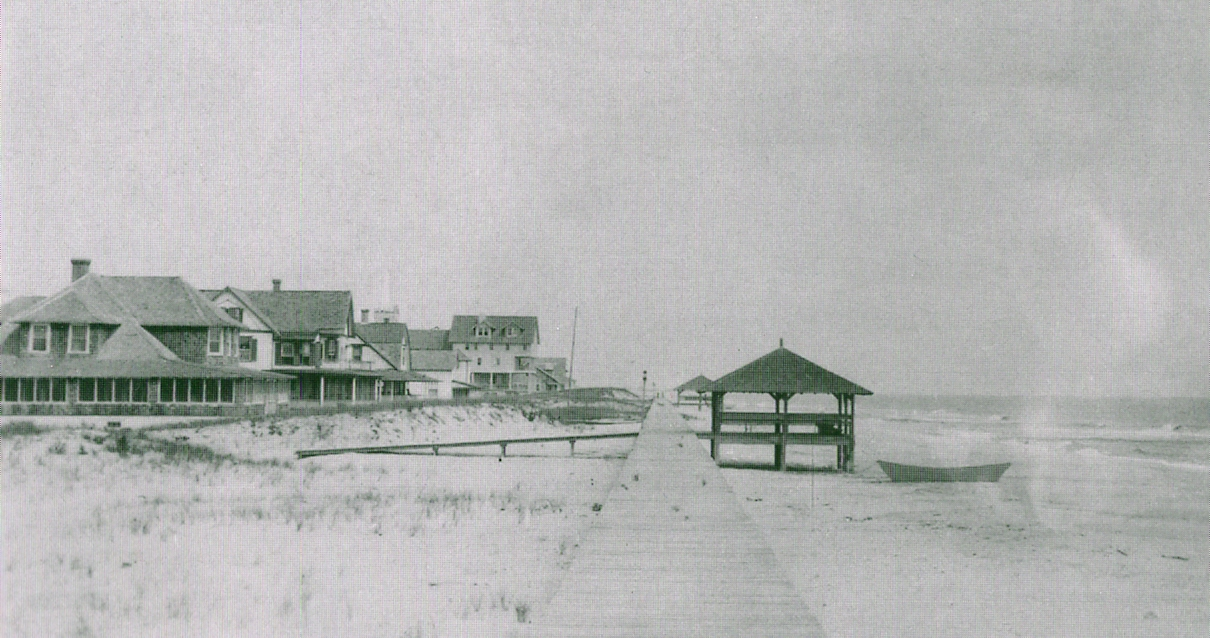
A view looking north of the original, surface-level boardwalk at Bethany Beach that was completed in 1903. It was destroyed by a storm in 1920.

Twenty-three landowners, mostly from the Pittsburgh area, concerned that the value of their Bethany Beach lots would drop, selected a committee to address the situation. The committee studied the problem, communicated with the Christian Missionary Society, and in September 1902 organized a meeting in Washington, D.C., which led to lengthy negotiations about putting Bethany Beach on a firm financial footing. The negotiations dragged on until 1903, when six Pittsburgh-area investors agreed to buy all of the Bethany Beach Improvement Company's stock, selling three shares to a Delaware resident so that there would be at least some local ownership. This put the company on a firm financial footing and allowed the development of Bethany Beach to resume.

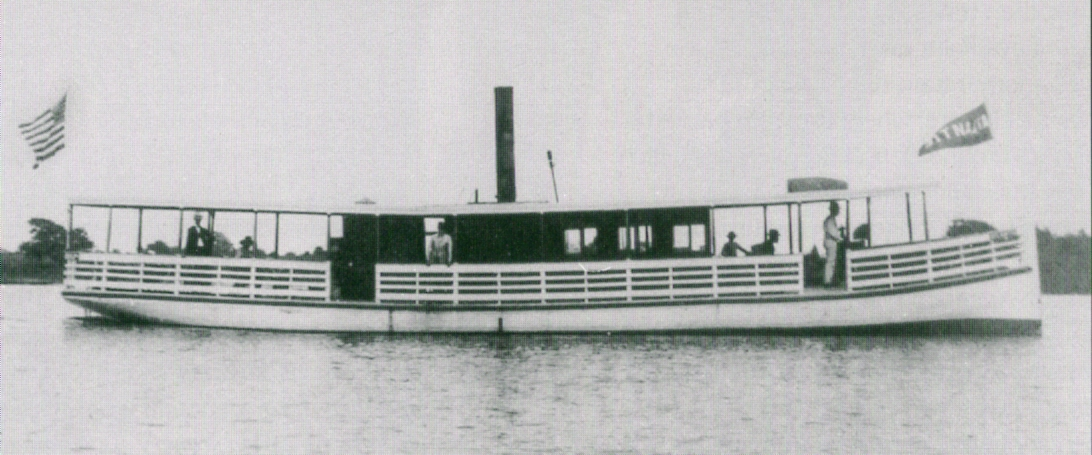
The steamer Atlantic, which until 1910 transported passengers bound for Bethany Beach between Rehoboth Beach, Delaware, and Ocean View, Delaware.

The Christian Missionary Society eventually restored its endorsement of Bethany Beach, and summer programs modeled on the Chatauqua movement began in the town, meeting with modest success. Soon, the Bethany Beach Improvement Company dug a well to provide the town with fresh water. In 1903, the company completed the Tabernacle and built a surface-level boardwalk along the beach.

=== The "Quiet Years" ===
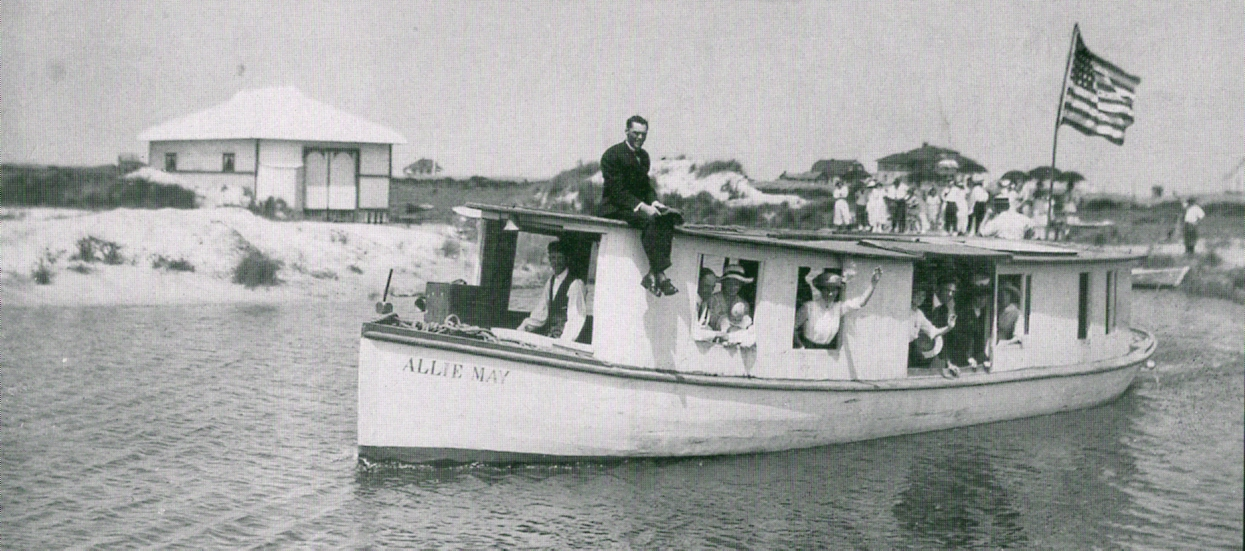
The motorboat Allie May, which transported passengers between Rehoboth Beach and Bethany Beach from 1910 to 1912.

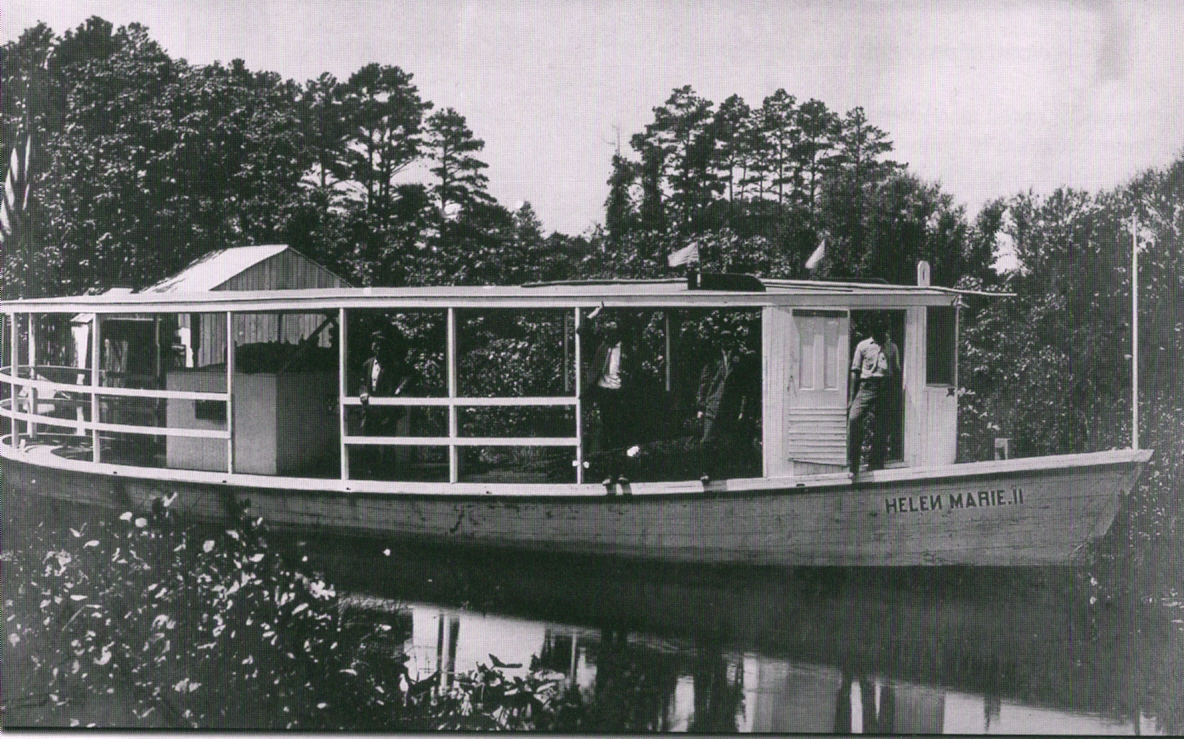
The motorboat Helen Marie II, which replaced the Allie May on the Rehoboth Beach-Bethany Beach run in 1912.

Longtime residents and regular visitors came to refer to Bethany Beach's history prior to the early 1950s as the "Quiet Years". Despite the plans of the town's founders to build one, no railroad ever came to Bethany Beach because traffic was insufficient to make such a railroad profitable, so visitors typically had to travel by train to Baltimore, Maryland, spend the night there, then travel by boat across the Chesapeake Bay to the Delmarva Peninsula and by train across the peninsula to Rehoboth Beach. Until 1910, they then had to take the steamer Atlantic across Rehoboth Bay and Indian River Bay to Ocean View, and then travel by horsedrawn carriage to Bethany Beach. On July 8, 1910, the Loop Canal was completed in Bethany Beach, allowing the motorboat Allie May—replaced in 1912 by the motorboat Helen Marie II—to dock at the town itself. Even with this improvement, however, the trip to Bethany Beach was uncomfortable and exhausting and from anywhere outside Delaware took at least a full day; from Pittsburgh it took two.

Bethany Beach's remote location meant that most beachgoers preferred to visit Rehoboth Beach to the north or Ocean City, Maryland, to the south, both of which they could reach directly by train. The small population of permanent residents of and regular visitors to Bethany Beach came to know one another well, and the town remained a quiet place that contrasted with the busier and more crowded atmosphere of Rehoboth Beach and Ocean City. Throughout the Quiet Years, it was unusual to find more than 20 people on Bethany Beach's wide beach at any one time. Bethany Beach's origin as a Christian community also tended to favor a quieter lifestyle; in its early years, for example, the religious character of Bethany Beach was expressed through the prohibition of non-religious activities on Sunday, although swimming in the ocean was permitted on Sundays between 3:00 and 6:00 pm. Although Bethany Beach became more and more secular and more developed over the years, it retains its "Quiet Resort" reputation to this day.

Many of the property owners during the Quiet Years were from Washington, D.C., and Pittsburgh. Those from Pittsburgh tended to have homes in the northern part of Bethany Beach—at least part of which became known as "Little Pittsburgh" for a time—while Washingtonians tended to build their houses on properties in the southern part of town.

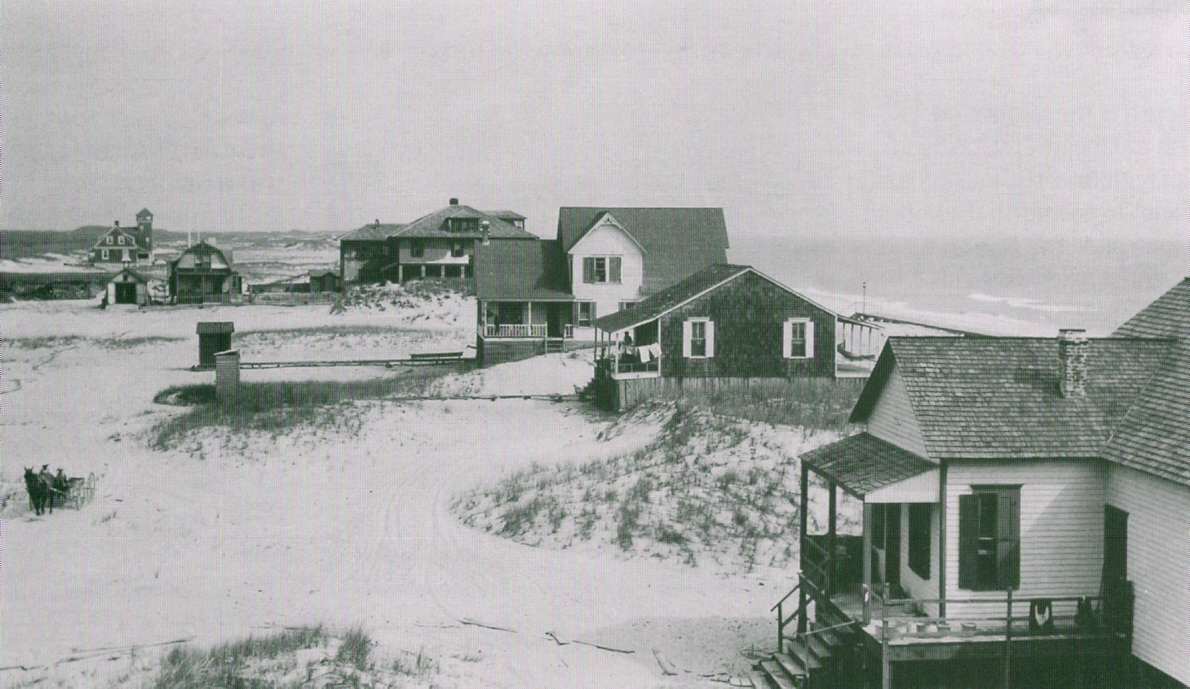
Northern Bethany Beach in the town's early years, with the lifesaving station in the distance. The dark-colored cottage second from right was destroyed by a storm in 1920.

During the Quiet Years, Bethany Beach gradually acquired more and more amenities and its government provided more and more services. The Ocean View Post Office established a branch in Bethany Beach in 1904, though it appears that a regular mail route including the town was not available until 1922. A town newspaper, the Bethany Herald, began publication in 1904; later renamed the Bethany Booster, its name eventually was switched back to Bethany Herald, and it published until the late 1980s. The boardwalk was reconstructed in 1905, a United States Lifesaving Service station began operations in the town in 1907, and the Town of Bethany Beach was incorporated in 1909. The Bethany Beach School was established for students in grades one through six; after the sixth grade they had to attend Lord Baltimore School in Ocean View. The boardwalk underwent yet another reconstruction in 1912.

When the U.S. Lifesaving Service merged with the United States Revenue Cutter Service to form the United States Coast Guard in 1915, the town's lifesaving station became a Coast Guard station. The Delaware National Guard established a summer training camp just north of town in the early 1920s. The Ringler Theater, which showed movies and hosted dance parties, opened on the boardwalk in 1923; generally considered to be the first commercial enterprise on the boardwalk, it became one of the town's major attractions. A privately owned electric lighting plant began operations in 1924, lighting the town hall and street lamps; in 1926, the town bought the plant and began garbage collection. The town's lone bowling alley opened in 1930 and became a popular social attraction, The first restaurant on the boardwalk that was not part of a hotel opened in 1933 and stood until destroyed by a fire in 1953. Bethany Beach's first tennis court was completed in the mid-1930s. A dirt road between Rehoboth Beach and Bethany Beach, the first road between the two towns, opened in 1934.

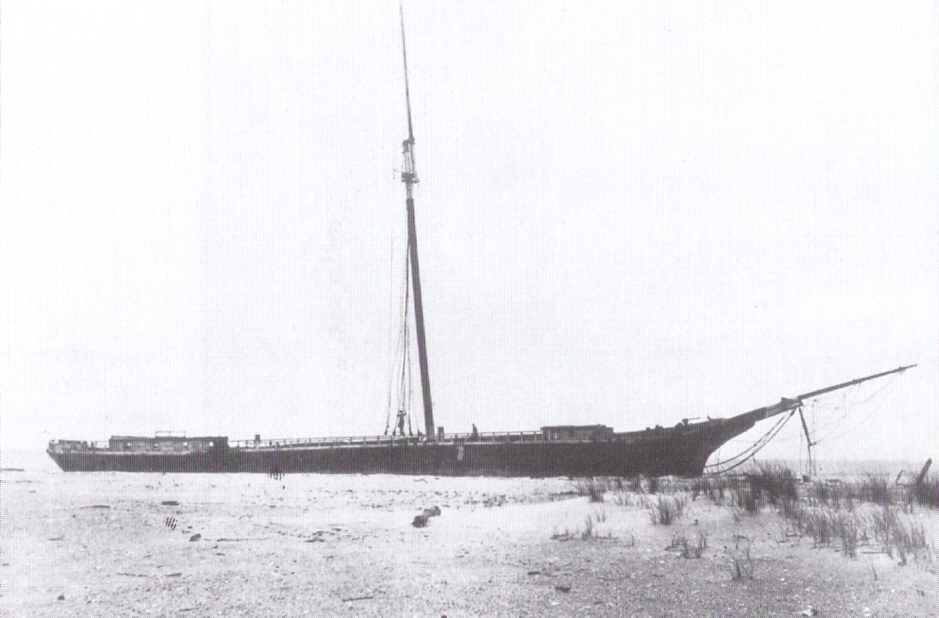
The ship O. D. Witherell aground 3½ miles (5.6 kilometers) south of Bethany Beach on April 21, 1911. Built in 1874, she had been on a voyage from New York City to Philadelphia, Pennsylvania.

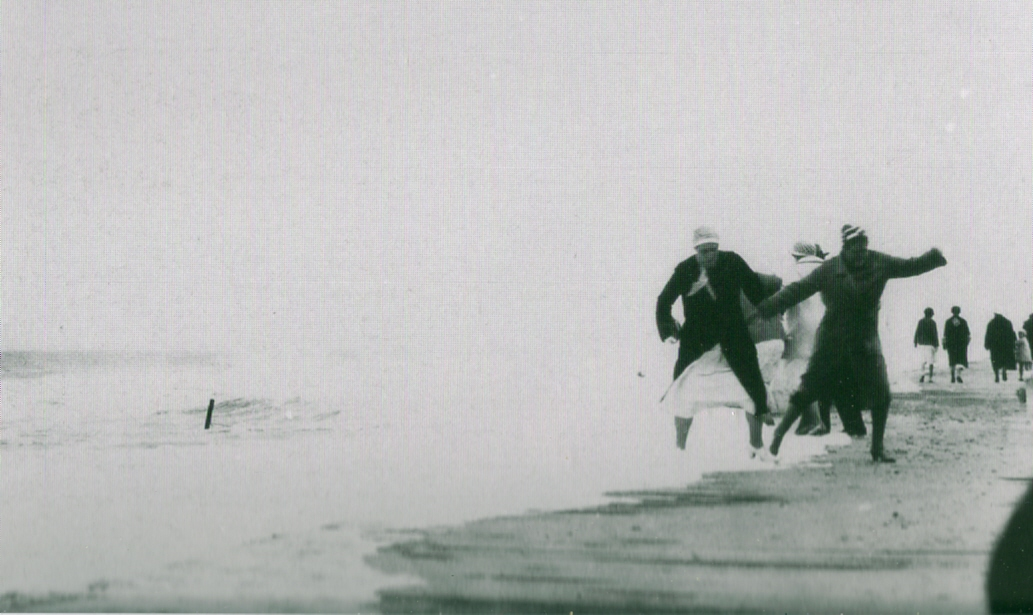
A wave breaks across the original, surface-level boardwalk at Bethany Beach. After the 1920 storm destroyed it, it was replaced by an elevated boardwalk in 1923.

The Quiet Years were not without dramatic events. Shipwrecks had occurred along the Delaware coast for centuries, and were not uncommon in Bethany Beach's area even in the early 20th century. A 1920 storm destroyed some beachfront houses and the original surface-level boardwalk, which soon was replaced by a new, elevated boardwalk. Another damaging storm struck in 1927. The intense 1933 Chesapeake–Potomac hurricane passed through the area in August 1933, causing flooding in Bethany Beach but no deaths anywhere in Delaware.

No church came to Bethany Beach other than that of its founders, the Disciples of Christ, until 1940, when an Episcopalian church opened in the town. A Roman Catholic church opened in Bethany Beach in 1956.

==== World War II era ====
World War II temporarily interrupted the Quiet Years. The United States government took an increasing interest in defending the Delaware coast after war broke out in Europe in 1939 and paved the road from Rehoboth Beach to a point south of Bethany Beach in 1940. The impact of the war on the area increased after the United States entered the war in December 1941: the town was blacked out at night beginning in 1942 to reduce the chance of German submarine attacks on ships offshore, and the beach and boardwalk closed at 9:00 p.m. to make it easier for military personnel to patrol against landings by enemy agents and saboteurs. Many personnel of the various armed forces were billeted in the town or based nearby, German prisoners of war were held in the area, a radar station was built nearby to the west, and the United States Army built a gunnery control tower south of town to support the Coast Artillery guns at Fort Miles on Cape Henlopen. Patrol dogs intended for use along the entire United States East Coast were trained just north of Bethany Beach. Wartime gasoline rationing made frequent short trips to Bethany Beach impractical, and many of the visitors during the war years spent entire summers at Bethany Beach instead.

During the war, a destructive storm struck Bethany Beach in mid-September 1944. It destroyed the Ringler Theater, which was not rebuilt, and badly damaged the boardwalk and the town's pavilion. The boardwalk was rebuilt later that year.

The customary atmosphere of the Quiet Years resumed soon after World War II ended in 1945. By 1946, all Bethany Beach residents received water service. In 1948, the all-volunteer Bethany Beach Fire Department was established, and the town acquired property for a fire station in 1949.

=== Bethany Beach's growth years ===
==== The 1950s and early 1960s ====
In 1952, the first span of the Chesapeake Bay Bridge opened, heralding the end of the Quiet Years and the beginning of accelerated development of the area as a beach resort. The bridge allowed motorists for the first time to drive from Washington, D.C., and Baltimore to the Delmarva Peninsula without a lengthy drive circling around the northern tip of the Chesapeake Bay. This made the Delaware coast a more popular vacation destination, and the development of real estate in and around Bethany Beach began in earnest. A real estate boom began, and was in full swing by the late 1960s; banking flourished in the area. The opening of the bridge's second span in 1973 made access even easier and, if anything, accelerated development further. Bethany Beach residents generally opposed the development of the area sparked by the opening of the bridge, and much political fighting occurred over the various real estate projects proposed for the area. Ultimately, economic pressure to develop the area was too great, and the Quiet Years came to end.

The first development north of Bethany Beach, Sussex Shores, opened in either 1953 or 1958. South of town, the Middlesex Beach community was built in 1958–1959. South Bethany, to the south of Middlesex Beach, considered the first major new development in the area, was built in 1962 and incorporated as a town in its own right in 1969.

In 1961, the original Tabernacle, which had deteriorated badly since its completion 58 years earlier, was demolished.

The most destructive storm in Bethany Beach's history, the Ash Wednesday Storm of 1962, was a surprise nor'easter that struck in March 1962. Created by the combination of what had been two separate storms, the nor'easter arrived on the evening of March 5, with 80-mile-per-hour (129-kilometer-per-hour) winds and 30-foot (9.1-meter) waves. The storm continued through three high tides while the tides were at their monthly peak before abating on March 7. Destruction was widespread; many of the beachfront structures that had stood since Bethany Beach's early decades were destroyed, including the bowling alley and many of the inns and houses, as were the boardwalk and town pavilion. Only one beachfront house in the southern part of town survived. Flood waters penetrated as far inland as Ocean View, and only three houses anywhere in Bethany Beach escaped flooding. Extensive beach erosion occurred, and sand several feet (over a meter) deep buried streets and cars and filled entire rooms in some houses. Damages along the Delmarva Peninsula's Atlantic coastline exceeded $50 million (USD). After the storm, the town rebuilt the boardwalk and put new regulations in place requiring that beach houses be built on 30-foot (9.1-meter) pilings. The 1962 storm had a lasting effect on Bethany Beach. Some longtime residents left Bethany Beach for good, while others noted that much of the old Bethany Beach of the Quiet Years had been destroyed, changing the character of the town forever.

==== 1962–1979 ====
Development of the area resumed after the 1962 storm. A new post office opened in 1965 and the town's first bank in 1966. Construction of Bethany West, a major new development in the western part of Bethany Beach proper, began in 1966–1967. A new town hall and police station opened in 1970.

Plans for a beach and tennis community, Sea Colony, centered on nine high-rise condominiums situated on a private beach between Bethany Beach and South Bethany, began in 1969; these buildings, the Bethany Beach area's first and only high-rises, opened in the early 1970s. The 1,200-townhome Sea Colony West low-rise beach and tennis resort development later was added just inland. Plans for Sea Colony met bitter opposition from longtime Bethany Beach residents, who were dismayed at the thought of high-rises and large crowds in the area; town regulations had been designed to prevent the construction of high-rises within town limits. Opponents of Sea Colony marched in protest and engaged in protracted legal efforts to block construction of the resort, but the property lay outside the town limits and their efforts to block the construction of Sea Colony failed. Sea Colony went on to become a very successful resort.

Bethany Beach installed its first parking meters in 1974, and they have become a major source of seasonal revenue for the town. In 1975, Bethany Beach installed a sewerage system and repaved its roads. A bandstand was built on the boardwalk in 1976, and serves to this day as the venue for musical performances and cultural events. The Bethany Beach-Fenwick Area Chamber of Commerce began operations in 1976.

On December 22, 1976, a sculpture (widely but incorrectly referred to as a "totem pole") created by Hungarian sculptor Peter Toth – who donated at least one sculpture to each of the 50 U.S. states as well as to locations in Canada in his "Trail of the Whispering Giants" project, a tribute to Native Americans – was dedicated at the intersection of Delaware Avenue (Route 1) and Garfield Parkway. The installation of the sculpture was controversial; many residents viewed it as irrelevant to Bethany Beach, where no history of Native American activity has been found. Although opponents of the sculpture suggested that its installation at Oak Orchard, the hub of Nanticoke settlement since the mid-17th century, would be much more appropriate, Toth wanted a more visible location and the sculpture was erected in Bethany Beach. The sculpture was named "Chief Little Owl" in honor of a Nanticoke chief of that name.

==== 1980s and 1990s ====
Given its Christian roots and its secular desire to remain a "Quiet Resort", Bethany Beach historically had resisted the sale of alcoholic beverages within its jurisdiction. In 1982, the State of Delaware granted the Holiday House in Bethany Beach a liquor license, the first to an establishment in the town, prompting a lawsuit by the town and local landowners. Ultimately, Bethany Beach accepted the sale of alcohol, but the town strictly limits the number of bars within town limits, generally limits alcohol sales to restaurants, and permits no sale of alcoholic beverages after 11:30 pm.

In the early 1980s, the Bethany Beach Fire Department offered the town's first emergency medical center, operated for the fire department by the Beebe Medical Center of Lewes, Delaware.

Hurricane Gloria struck Bethany Beach in September 1985, badly damaging the boardwalk.

In July 1987, the Bethany Beach Fire Department opened a substation in Fenwick Island, Delaware, on the coast a few miles south of Bethany Beach. A major beach replenishment project took place in 1989.

On January 4, 1992, a destructive nor'easter struck Bethany Beach with 85-mile-per-hour (137-kilometer-per-hour) winds. It inflicted $250,000 in damage to the boardwalk, severely damaged beachfront structures, flooded eastern Bethany Beach and the fire station, and caused Toth's 1976 sculpture "Chief Little Owl" — which termites already had damaged badly — to lean over dangerously. The remains of Toth's sculpture were removed and donated to the Nanticoke Indian Museum in Millsboro, Delaware. In 1994, a new sculpture created by Dennis Beach and also known as "Chief Little Owl" was installed as a replacement for Toth's 1976 sculpture.

The town's library, the South Coastal Library, opened on January 17, 1994. The town inaugurated a "Concerts at the Beach" program in 1995. On September 11, 1996, Bethany Beach broke ground for its new town hall and community center on what had been the site of its water tower. The building was dedicated on May 24, 1997.

Severe nor'easters struck a week apart in 1998. The first, on January 28, was damaging, but the second, on February 4, was worse, and prompted the evacuation of low-lying areas due to the danger of flooding, those areas not having recovered from the first storm a week earlier. Severe beach erosion resulted from the 1998 storms.

==== Since 2000 ====
By 2000, Dennis Beach's 1994 "Chief Little Owl" sculpture had rotted, and it was removed that year. The creator of the original 1976 sculpture, Peter Toth, crafted a third version of the "Chief Little Owl" sculpture in 2001 using red cedar imported from the Pacific Northwest. Designed to last between 50 and 150 years, it was dedicated on July 15, 2002, in a ceremony in which one of Little Owl's descendants blessed the sculpture in traditional Nanticoke fashion with song, prayer, and tobacco.

In 2001, Bethany Beach celebrated its centennial and completed a new tabernacle.

Over the winter of 2008–2009, the town's beaches underwent a vast beach replenishment program that cost the U.S. federal government approximately $20 million. The dunes put in place with the program are controversial because they reach over the height of the boardwalk, blocking most views of the ocean. Much of the criticism of them came from editorials in newspapers such as the local Delaware Wave and Coastal Point, along with Washington, D.C. media outlets. Remnants of Tropical Storm Ida hit the town in November 2009, destroying most of the dunes, leaving cliffs, making the beach significantly narrower, and revealing old jetties. Losses were estimated to cost the state of Delaware $40 million {USD} and repairs were not made until after the 2010 summer beach season.

By 2011, Bethany Beach had joined a growing number of communities in instituting a smoking ban, covering most of the beach and boardwalk areas.

A nor'easter hit Bethany Beach from October 2 to 4, 2015, and severely eroded the beach and dune and flooded parts of the town, especially in its northern section. A winter storm that struck the town from January 22 to 24, 2016, washed away major sections of what was left of the town's dune and breached it in some places, again causing flooding. In February 2016, officials announced that there was no funding available for replenishment of Bethany Beach's dune and beach during 2016, and that replenishment would not take place until 2017, in accordance with the schedule established before the two storms hit.

== Education ==
Residents are in the Indian River School District.

In "the Quiet Years" Bethany Beach School was established for students in grades one through six; after the sixth grade they had to attend Lord Baltimore School in Ocean View.

== Notable people ==
- Henry Clay Drexler, Medal of Honor recipient
- Liane Hansen, journalist
- Butch Lewis, boxing promoter
- Edward P. Lilly, historian

== Historic sites ==
The Indian River Life Saving Service Station, Poplar Thicket, and the Wilgus Site all are in the vicinity of Bethany Beach and are listed on the National Register of Historic Places.

Preceded by Sussex Shores	Beaches of Delmarva	Succeeded by Middlesex Beach
