= Sussex Shores, Delaware =

Unincorporated community in Delaware, United States

- Unincorporated community
- Location within Delaware Location within the United States
- Coordinates: 38°33′00″N 75°03′26″W
- Country: United States
- State: Delaware
- County: Sussex
- Elevation: 10 ft (3.0 m)
- Time zone: UTC-5 (Eastern (EST))
  - Summer (DST): UTC-4 (EDT)
- ZIP code: 19930
- Area code: 302
- GNIS feature ID: 214709

Sussex Shores is an unincorporated community in Sussex County, Delaware, United States. Sussex Shores is located along the Atlantic Ocean and Delaware Route 1, north of Bethany Beach and south of Delaware Seashore State Park. Sussex Shores was built in the 1950s and was the first of several developments built to the north of Bethany Beach.

Preceded by Delaware Seashore State Park	Beaches of Delmarva	Succeeded by Bethany Beach
