= Indian River (Delaware) =

River in Delaware, United States

Coordinates: 38.59163°N 75.15972°W

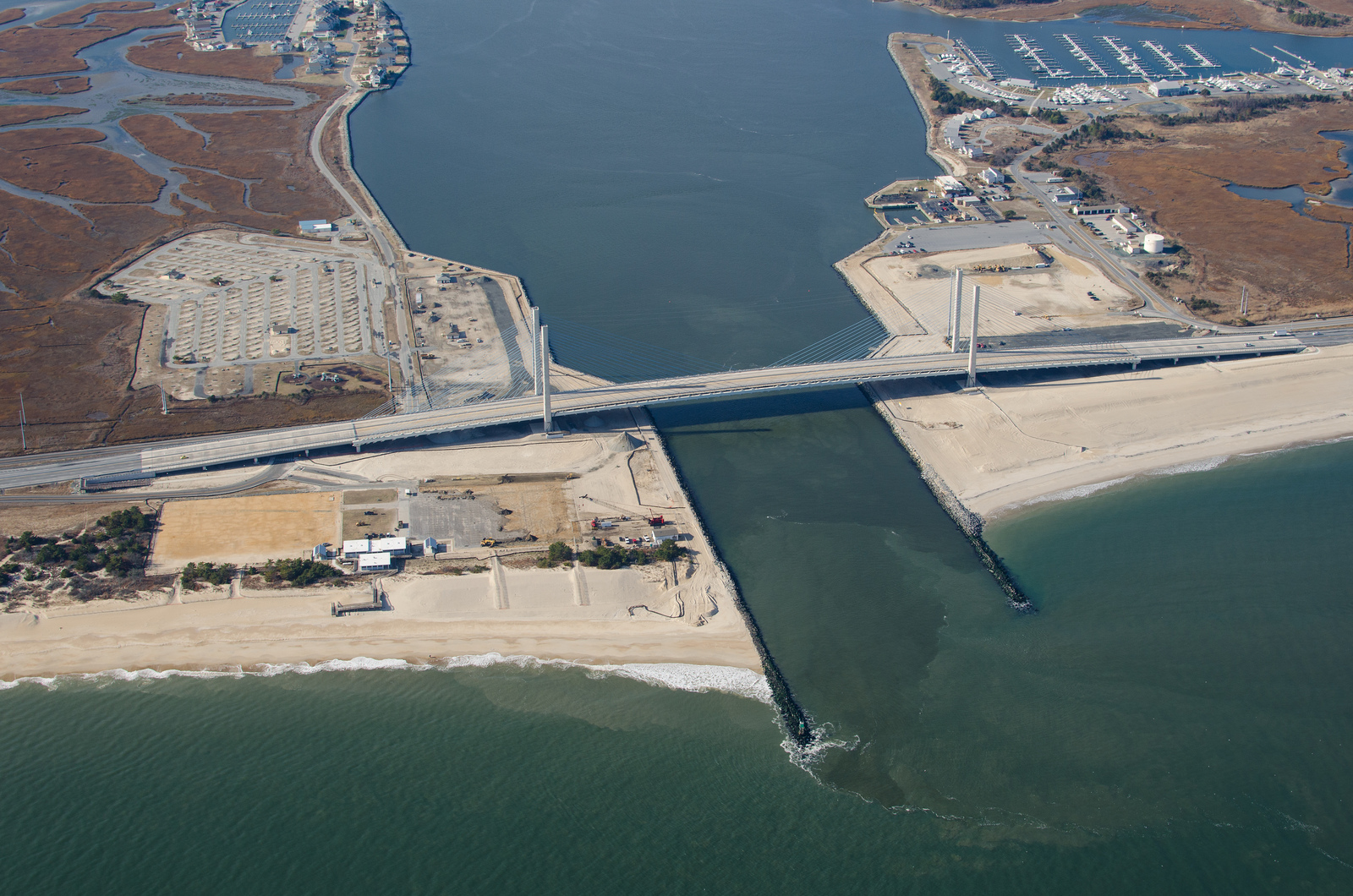
Indian River Inlet, spanned by the Indian River Inlet Bridge that opened in 2012, photographed from over the Atlantic Ocean at an altitude of 2,000 feet (610 meters) looking west toward Indian River Bay.

The Indian River is a river and estuary, approximately 15 mi (24 km) long, in Sussex County in southern Delaware in the United States. The river is named after a Native American reservation that was located on its upper reaches.

The Indian River rises approximately 2 miles (3.2 km) southwest of Georgetown and flows east, past Millsboro, its head of navigation. It enters Indian River Bay, an inlet of the Atlantic Ocean south of Cape Henlopen. The lower 6 miles (9.7 km) of the river form a navigable tidal estuary stretching westward from Indian River Bay, which is protected from the open ocean by two sand bar peninsulas. East of the bay is its mouth, the Indian River Inlet.

Until 1928, the Indian River Inlet was a natural waterway that shifted up and down a two-mile (3.2 km) stretch of the coast. Dredging kept the inlet open in its current location between 1928 and 1937. In 1938 the United States Army Corps of Engineers built jetties that hold it in place to improve operations for river users.

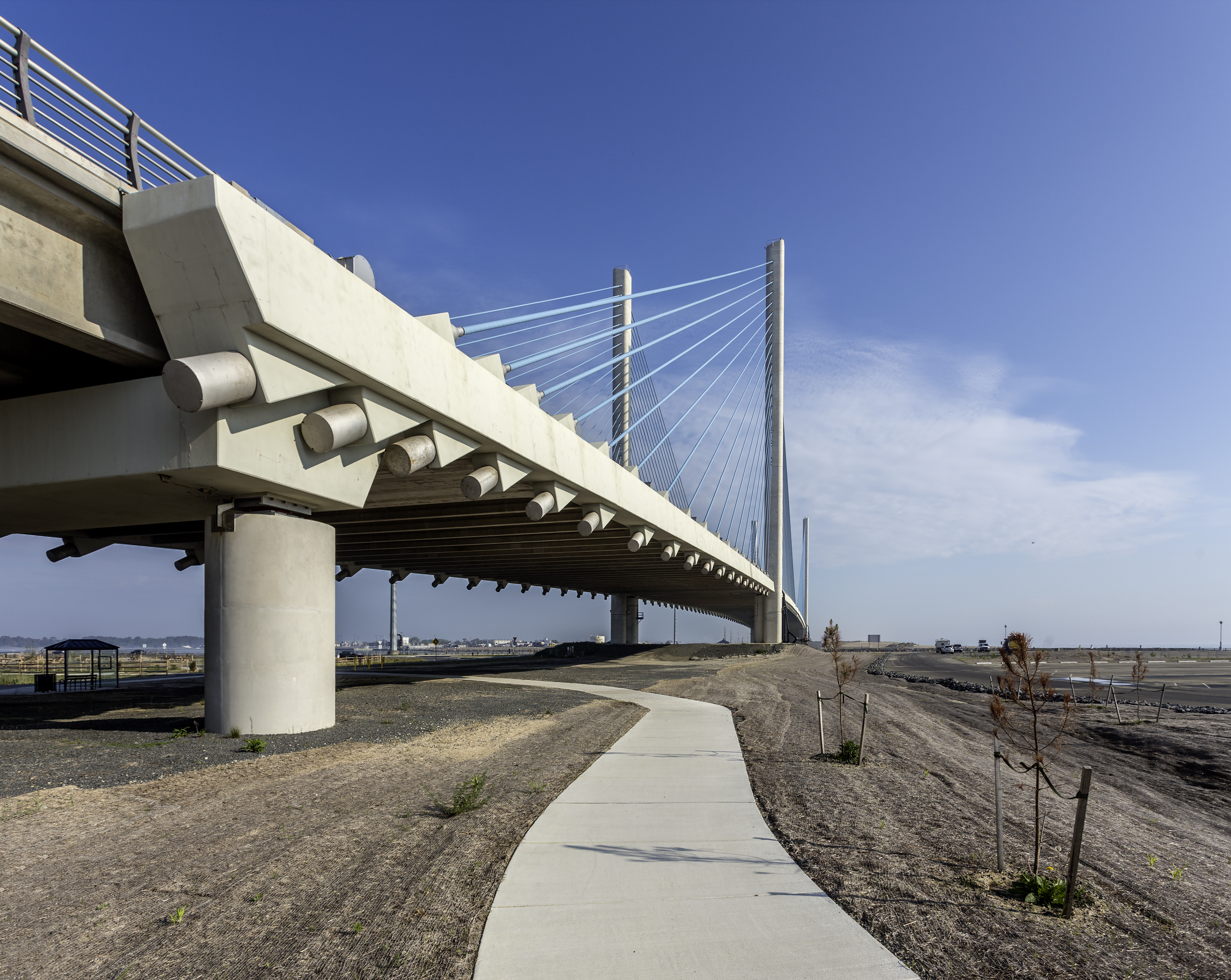
The Indian River Inlet bridge, looking north

Roads cross the river in three places, at U.S. Route 113 (in Millsboro), Delaware Route 24/Delaware Route 30 (also in Millsboro), and Delaware Route 1 (at Indian River Inlet in the Delaware Seashore State Park).

With the Indian River Inlet in a fixed place beginning in 1928, it became possible to build a bridge to span it. In 1933 Ocean Highway was completed (the present-day Delaware Route 1 and now known as Coastal Highway) between Rehoboth Beach and Bethany Beach.

Following that, Delaware built a span to connect the northern and southern segments of the highway. Since 1934, six bridges have spanned the inlet, all known informally as the Indian River Inlet Bridge. All but the first officially were named the Charles W. Cullen Bridge. The current Indian River Inlet Bridge opened in 2012.

== See also ==
- List of Delaware rivers
