= Indian Beach, Delaware =

Unincorporated community in Delaware, United States

- Unincorporated community
- Location within Delaware Location within the United States
- Coordinates: 38°41′08″N 75°4′24″W
- Country: United States
- State: Delaware
- County: Sussex
- Elevation: 3 ft (0.91 m)
- Time zone: UTC-5 (Eastern (EST))
  - Summer (DST): UTC-4 (EDT)
- Area code: 302
- GNIS feature ID: 216121

Indian Beach is an unincorporated community in Sussex County, Delaware, United States. Indian Beach is located on the Atlantic Ocean and Delaware Route 1, south of Dewey Beach.

Preceded by Dewey Beach	Beaches of Delmarva	Succeeded by Delaware Seashore State Park
