= List of museums in Delaware =

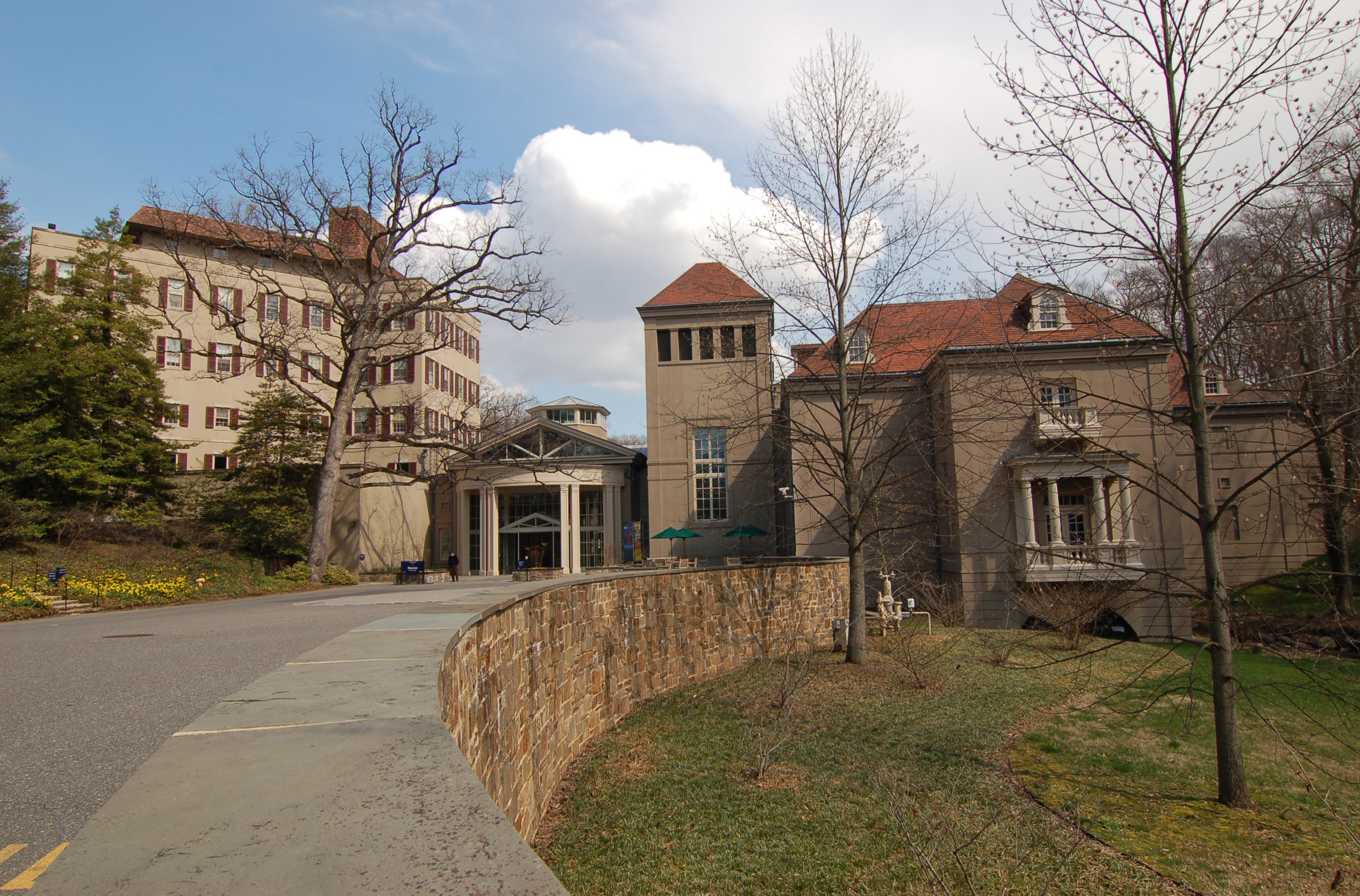
Winterthur Museum, Garden and Library

This list of museums in Delaware contains museums which are defined for this context as institutions (including nonprofit organizations, government entities, and private businesses) that collect and care for objects of cultural, artistic, scientific, or historical interest and make their collections or related exhibits available for public viewing.

== Current museums ==
Name	Location	County	Area of study	Summary
Air Mobility Command Museum	Dover Air Force Base	Kent	Military	Military airlift and air refueling aircraft
Amstel House	New Castle	New Castle	Historic house	Operated by the New Castle Historical Society, 1730s Georgian mansion linked to many of the town’s prominent colonial families
Anna Hazzard Museum	Rehoboth Beach	Sussex	History	1890s camp meeting history
Barratt's Chapel and Museum	Frederica	Kent	Religious	1780 Methodist chapel and museum about history of Methodism
Bethany Beach History Museum	Bethany Beach	Sussex	Local history	website, located in Bethany Town Hall
Bethel Heritage Museum	Bethel	Sussex	Open air	Historic village
Biggs Museum of American Art	Dover	Kent	Art	American fine and decorative arts, part of First State Heritage Park
Blue Ball Barn	Wilmington	New Castle	Art	A.I. du Pont barn with state collection of folk art, located in Alapocas Run State Park
Bridgeville Historical Society Museum	Bridgeville	Sussex	Local history	
Cannonball House Maritime Museum	Lewes	Sussex	Maritime	website, maritime artifacts, operated by the Lewes Historical Society
Center for the Creative Arts	Yorklyn	New Castle	Community art	website, community instruction center with 410 Gallery of local art
Coverdale Farm Preserve	Greenville	New Castle	Farm	website, 19th-century operating farm and preserve, operated by the Delaware Nature Society
Days Gone By Museum	Seaford	Sussex	Local history	Local history, antique tractors, carpenter's tools and other artifacts
Delaware Agricultural Museum and Village	Dover	Kent	Agriculture	website, includes Loockerman Landing Village, a representation of a rural village in 1890s with a store, farmhouse, schoolhouse and other building; farm equipment and tools, collection of carved folk art farm scenes, local art exhibits
Delaware Art Museum	Wilmington	New Castle	Art	Contains over 12,000 works focusing on American art and illustration from the 19th to the 21st century as well as the English Pre-Raphaelite movement of the mid-19th century
Delaware Aviation Museum	Georgetown	Sussex	Aviation	website, located at Delaware Coastal Airport, features WWII aviation artifacts, memorabilia and displays
Delaware Center for the Contemporary Arts	Wilmington	New Castle	Art	Presents nearly 30 exhibitions annually of regionally, nationally, and internationally recognized contemporary artists
Delaware Center for Horticulture	Greenville	New Castle	Natural history	Community horticulture resource organization with public gardens, library and art gallery
Delaware Children's Museum	Wilmington	New Castle	Children's	website, located on Wilmington Riverfront
Delaware History Museum	Wilmington	New Castle	History	Operated by the Delaware Historical Society, cultural and historical Delaware exhibits, including everyday life artifacts, costumes, children's toys, regional decorative arts, and paintings
Delaware Mineralogical Society	Wilmington	New Castle	Natural history	Non-profit organization promoting education in earth science and lapidary art, annual show first full weekend in March hosting museum and educational exhibits
Delaware Museum of Nature and Science	Greenville	New Castle	Natural history	Features collections of seashells, birds, and bird eggs, exhibits on dinosaurs, mammals, and Charles Darwin
Delaware Sports Museum and Hall of Fame	Wilmington	New Castle	Hall of fame – sports	Over 150 years of Delaware sports history, located at Frawley Stadium
Delaware Legislative Hall	Dover	Kent	History	State capitol building, open for guided tours
Dinker-Irvin Cottage Museum	Bethany Beach	Sussex	Historic house museum	website, early 1900s
Delaware State Police Museum	Dover	Kent	Law enforcement	website, history of the Delaware State Police, badges, uniforms, vehicles
Delaware Visitor Center and Galleries	Dover	Kent	Local history	Delaware history and culture, part of First State Heritage Park
Delmar Depot Railroad and Military Museum	Delmar	Sussex	Railroad	
Discover Sea Shipwreck Museum	Fenwick Island	Sussex	Maritime	website, shipwreck and recovered artifacts both regional and worldwide
Dutch House (New Castle, Delaware)	New Castle	New Castle	Historic house	website, operated by the New Castle Historical Society, 17th-century early Delaware settlers' house
Elsie Williams Doll Collection	Georgetown	Sussex	Doll	website, located at Delaware Technical Community College (Jack F. Owens Campus), Stephen J. Betze Library; over 600 dolls from around the world
Fenwick Island Light	Fenwick Island	Sussex	Lighthouse	Small museum of the history of the lighthouse
First Presbyterian Church	Wilmington	New Castle	History	18th-century Presbyterian church, operated by The National Society of the Colonial Dames of America
Fort Delaware	Pea Patch Island	New Castle	Military	Historic fort with living history demonstrations
Georgetown Train Station	Georgetown	Sussex	Railroad	website, operated by the Historic Georgetown Association, restored 19th-century train station with model railroad layout
Governor Ross Mansion & Plantation	Seaford	Sussex	Historic house	Operated by the Seaford Historical Society; 1850s-period Victorian Italianate mansion with a slave quarter
Greenbank Mill	Wilmington	New Castle	Living	Includes the gristmill restoration, Madison Factory textile mill, Philips House, and the 19th-century farm with heritage livestock
Hagley Museum & Library	Wilmington	New Castle	History	Exhibits the unfolding history of American enterprise and is the site of the gunpowder works founded by E.I. du Pont in 1802
Hale-Byrnes House	Stanton	New Castle	Historic house	1750 historic house
Harrington Historical Society Museum	Harrington	Kent	Local history	Local memorabilia; also operates the Harrington Tower Railroad Museum nearby with a railroad tower, caboose and watchman’s hut
Harry Levin Center for Pharmacy & History	Smyrna	Kent	Medical	website, pharmacy history center started by founder of Happy Harry's drug stores and run by Delaware Pharmacists Society
Historic Houses of Odessa	Odessa	New Castle	Historic house	website, enclave of 18th- and early 19th-century buildings which includes the Corbit-Sharp House (c. 1774), Wilson-Warner House (c. 1769), Collins-Sharp House (c. 1700), Brick Hotel (c. 1822), and Odessa Bank (c. 1853)
Indian River Lifesaving Station Museum	Rehoboth Beach	Sussex	Maritime	Located in Delaware Seashore State Park
Iron Hill Museum	Newark	New Castle	History / Natural history	Former one-room schoolhouse built by the du Pont family in 1923; collections include rocks, minerals, floral and faunal specimens, archeological and historical displays, mounted birds and iron exhibits
John Bell House	Dover	Kent	Local history	Interpretive center for the First State Heritage Park
John Dickinson Plantation	Dover	Kent	Historic house	18th-century home of John Dickinson
Johnson Victrola Museum	Dover	Kent	Biographical	Part of First State Heritage Park, exhibits about Eldridge Reeves Johnson, founder of the Victor Talking Machine Company, including phonographs, recordings, memorabilia, trademarks, objects and paintings that highlight the development of the sound-recording industry
Laurel Heritage Museum	Laurel	Sussex	Local history	website, operated by the Laurel Historical Society in a restored trail station, also the Cook House Museum by appointment
Lewes Historical Society Complex	Lewes	Sussex	Open air	website, nine historic properties: Burton-Ingram House, Lewes Life-Saving Station Museum, Doctor's Office, Early Plank House, Ellegood House, Midway School #178, Rabbit's Ferry House, Thompson's Country Store
Lightship Overfalls	Lewes	Sussex	Maritime	Historic lightship museum
Marshall Steam Museum	Yorklyn	New Castle	Transportation	Part of Auburn Valley State Park, includes Stanley Steamer cars, electric cars, Packards, miniature railroad, locomotives, local history displays, Marshall Family Mansion
Marvel Carriage Museum	Georgetown	Sussex	Transportation	website, collection of antique carriages as well as many original, restored buildings, Victrolas, ephemera, photographs, telephones, furniture and many more items related to Georgetown; open by appointment; operated by the Georgetown Historical Society
Messick Museum	Harrington	Sussex	Agriculture	website, includes antique John Deere tractors, antique machinery, automobiles, tools, toys and farming memorabilia
Milford Museum	Milford	Sussex	Local history	website; model ships; silver collection of coins, spoons, and novelties; early settlement of Milford; the city's variety of architecture; prominent citizens; artifacts; photographs; and historical memorabilia
Milton Historical Society Museum	Milton	Sussex	Local history	website, history of Milton and the Broadkill Hundred, art gallery
Museum of Business History & Technology	Wilmington	New Castle	History	website, history about innovations in business technology, open by appointment
Nanticoke Indian Museum	Millsboro	Sussex	Native American	website, history of the Nanticoke Indian Association, jewelry, pottery, spears, arrow points, artifacts
Nemours Mansion and Gardens	Wilmington	New Castle	Mansion	A.I. duPont's mansion and French chateau-style grounds
Newark Historical Society Museum	Newark	New Castle	Local history	website, history of Newark and Delaware, museum open Sunday afternoons on a seasonal basis
New Castle Court House Museum	New Castle	New Castle	History	One of the oldest surviving court houses in the United States, exhibits about Delaware's colonial court and assembly, Delaware's Underground Railroad and abolitionists, and the early system of law and government
Old State House	Dover	Kent	History	Delaware's old state capitol building, restored for 18th-century appearance
Old Library Museum	New Castle	New Castle	Local history	website, operated by the New Castle Historical Society, changing exhibits of local history
Old Swedes Church	Wilmington	New Castle	History	Church building constructed in 1698–1699
Old Town Hall	Wilmington	New Castle	Historic site	Open by appointment with the Delaware Historical Society, the hall housed the city's meeting chambers, offices and jail
Paul R. Jones Collection of African American Art	Newark	New Castle	Art	Works by African American artists, part of the University of Delaware
Parson Thorne Mansion	Milford	Kent	Historic house	Operated by the Milford Historical Society
Pencader Heritage Museum	Newark	New Castle	Local history	website, operated by the Pencader Heritage Area Association
Read House & Gardens	New Castle	New Castle	Historic house	1801 mansion with 22 rooms, operated by the Delaware Historical Society
Rehoboth Art League	Rehoboth Beach	Sussex	Art	website, institution founded by Louise C. Corkran
Rehoboth Beach Museum	Rehoboth Beach	Sussex	Local history	website, operated by the Rehoboth Beach Historical Society
Robinson House	Claymont	New Castle	Historic house	1723 house, home of the Claymont Historical Society and the Darley Society
Rockwood Museum and Park	Wilmington	New Castle	Historic house	Restored Gilded Age mansion and historic landscape garden, located in Rockwood Park
Seaford Fire Museum	Seaford	Sussex	Firefighting	website, fire memorabilia related to the history of the Seaford Volunteer Fire Department
Seaford Museum	Seaford	Sussex	Local history	website, operated by the Seaford Historical Society
Smyrna Museum	Smyrna	Kent	Local history	website, operated by the Duck Creek Historical Society, period rooms, history of The Barracks, now the museum
Star Hill Museum	Camden	Kent	African American	Former AME church, site on the Underground Railroad, reproduction inventions by African-Americans, African artifacts, utensils used in daily slave life
Treasures of the Sea Exhibit	Georgetown	Sussex	Maritime	website, located at Delaware Technical Community College (Jack F. Owens Campus), Stephen J. Betze Library; artifacts from the shipwreck Nuestra Señora de Atocha
University Gallery	Newark	New Castle	Art	Part of the University of Delaware, photographs, prints, drawings, paintings and ceramics
University of Delaware Mineralogical Museum	Newark	New Castle	Geology	Part of the University of Delaware, minerals, petrified wood, meteorites, DuPont collection of gemstones
Willingtown Square	Wilmington	New Castle	Historic houses	Operated by the Delaware Historical Society, collection of four historic buildings, dating from 1748 to the early 19th century, which can be viewed from the outside, and changing local history exhibits in the Willingtown Square Gallery
Winterthur Museum, Garden and Library	Wilmington	New Castle	History	950 acres (3.8 km^{2}) with gardens, estate mansion with 175 period-room displays, museum galleries of fine and decorative arts, including American furniture, silver and metalwork, textiles and needlework, ceramics, glass, clock and woodworking shop displays
Woodburn	Dover	Kent	Historic house	Official residence of the governor of Delaware, dates back to 1798
Zwaanendael Museum	Lewes	Sussex	History	Honors the 300th anniversary of Delaware's first European settlement, founded in 1631; local history exhibits

== Proposed museums ==
Name	Location	County	Area of study	Summary
Afro-American Historical Society of Delaware	Wilmington	New Castle	African American	Proposed at Allied Kid Leather building in East Wilmington
Delaware Military Museum	Delaware City	New Castle	Military museum	website, proposed at Burton Hall building at Fort DuPont

== Defunct museums ==
- Delaware Archaeology Museum, Dover, website
- Delaware Toy & Miniature Museum, Wilmington; closed in 2007 due to financial difficulty
- First USA Riverfront Arts Center, Wilmington; closed amid legal dispute in 1999; converted to Chase Convention Center
- Museum of the American Road, New Castle; moved to New London, Connecticut
- Museum of Small Town Life, Dover
- Velocipede Museum, New Castle

== See also ==
- Botanical gardens in Delaware
- Forts in Delaware
- Historic landmarks in Delaware
- Houses in Delaware
- Nature Centers in Delaware
- Observatories in Delaware
- Registered Historic Places in Delaware
