= Bellanca Airfield Museum =

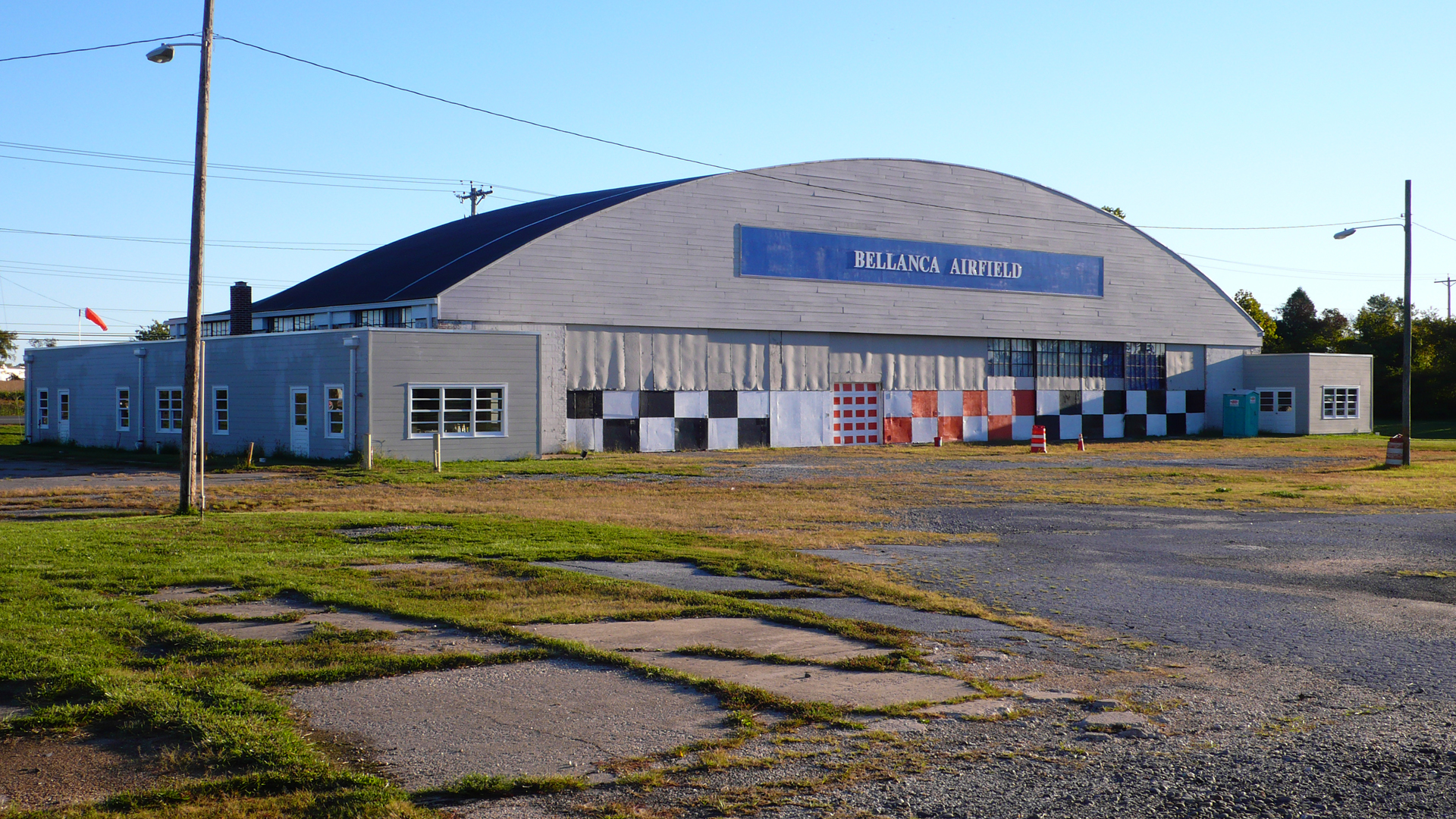
- Museum hangar

- Location within Delaware
- Location: New Castle, Delaware
- Coordinates: 39.6643°N 75.5868°W
- Type: Aviation museum
- Website: www.bellancamuseum.org

The Bellanca Airfield Museum is an aviation museum located in New Castle, Delaware focused on the history of Bellanca Airfield.

== History ==
After Bellanca Airfield closed in 1954, it the land was slowly taken over until the only remaining original building was a 1936-built hangar formerly operated by Air Service, Inc. Following an announcement by the owners of the hangar that it would be demolished unless an organization came forward to restore it, the Friends of Bellanca Airfield was formed in March 2003. Seven months later, during a 75th anniversary celebration for the former airport, the state announced a matching grant for the building's restoration. Two years later, in October 2005, the group received another grant from the Save America's Treasures program and the hangar was placed on the National Register of Historic Places. In November 2008, it acquired two Cruisemasters for restoration. By 2009, the group had replaced the roof, repainted the exterior and rebuilt an adjacent office space. Despite a slow down in fundraising, work continued and a partnership was formed with a non-profit organizing restoration vacations in 2011.

The museum received a Cruisair Senior from the National Air and Space Museum in 2014.

By 2015, the museum had changed its name to the Bellanca Airfield Museum.

The sole Bellanca Skyrocket II was donated by the Delaware Aviation Museum in 2020.

== Facilities ==
The museum is located inside a 7,800 sq ft (720 m^{2}) hangar with an adjacent 1,600 sq ft (150 m^{2}) office space. The structure was built to replace a previous hangar at the same location that burned down in 1936. It was not part of the Bellanca factory, but was operated by Air Service, Inc. (Note: The factory was demolished in 2001.)

A media center is located at the museum.

== Exhibits ==
Exhibits at the museum include a display with the members of the Delaware Aviation Hall of Fame.

== Collection ==
- 1911 Bellanca Monoplane – replica
- Bellanca 14-13-2 Cruisair Senior
- Bellanca 19-25 Skyrocket II
