= The Delaware Contemporary =

Museum in Wilmington, Delaware

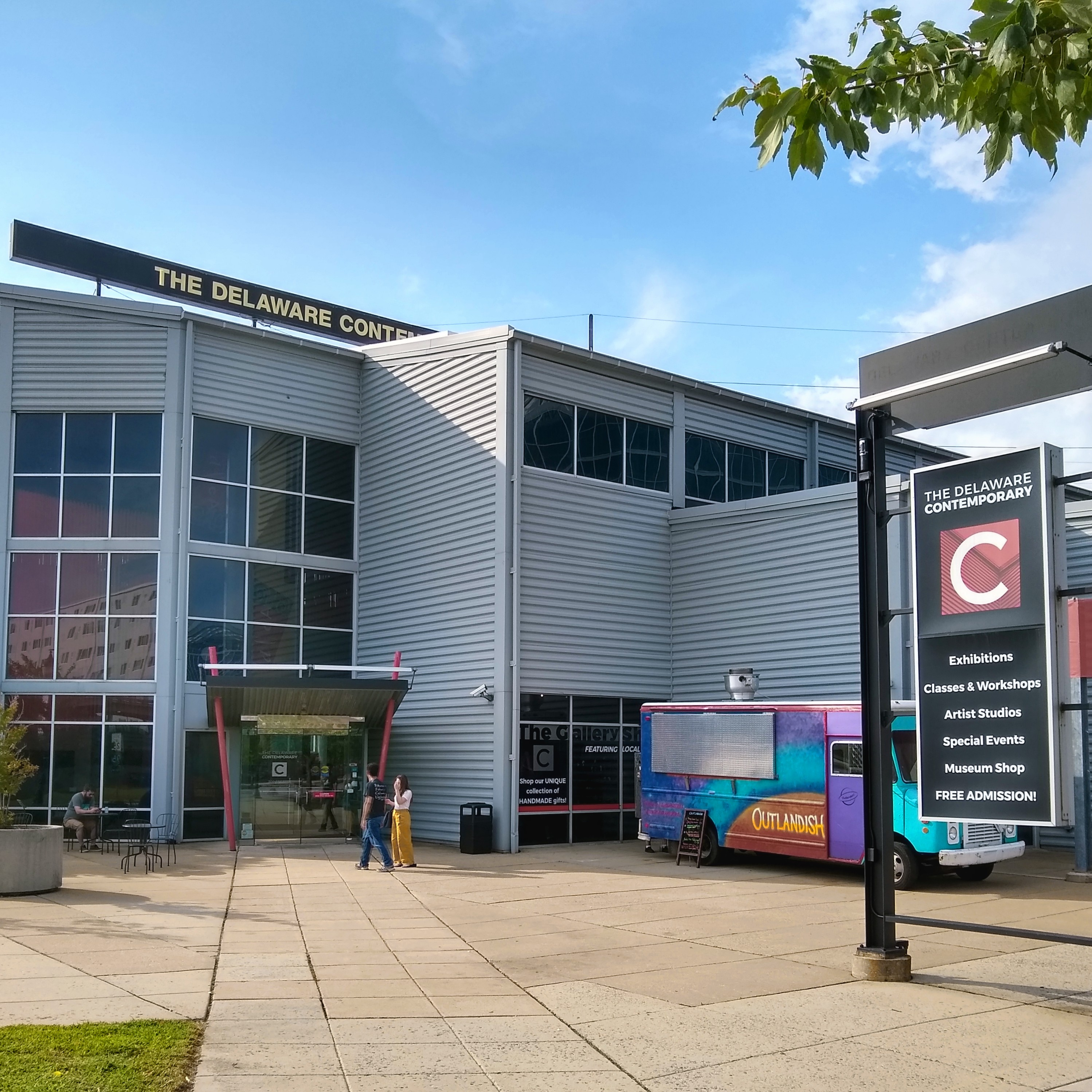
- The Delaware Contemporary as seen August 2019

- Location in Delaware The Delaware Contemporary (the United States)
- Established: 1979
- Location: 200 S. Madison St., Wilmington, Delaware
- Coordinates: 39.738907°N 75.560038°W
- Type: Contemporary Art
- Directors: Leslie Shaffer, Executive Director
- Curator: Chase Dougherty
- Public transit access: DART First State bus: 12
- Website: www.decontemporary.org

The Delaware Contemporary is Delaware's only contemporary art museum. Founded in 1979 as the Delaware Center for Contemporary Arts (DCCA) it rebranded to its current name in 2015. It is a non-collecting museum focused on work by local, regional, as well as national and international artists.

The Delaware Contemporary moved to the Riverfront in Wilmington, Delaware in 2000. The 33,000-square-foot building includes seven galleries, 26 art studios, an auditorium, a classroom, a museum shop, and administrative offices. In 2008, it ceased charging admission to view the galleries to offer families more affordable cultural choices during the Great Recession.

== See also ==
- Delaware Art Museum
- List of museums in Delaware
- University Museums at the University of Delaware
