= Yvonne Edwards Tucker =

American artist

- Born: Yvonne Edwards; January 19, 1941 (age 85); Chicago, Illinois, U.S.
- Education: South Side Community Art Center; Art Institute of Chicago; University of Illinois Urbana-Champaign; University of California, Los Angeles; Otis Art Institute

Yvonne Edwards Tucker, also known as Yvonne Edwards–Tucker (born 1941) is an American artist, known as a potter, sculptor, and educator. She has taught at Florida A&M University in Tallahassee since 1973.

== About ==
Yvonne Edwards is African-American and was raised in the South Side area of Chicago, Illinois. She was born to the accountant James Cecil Edwards and the educator Leatrice Johnson Edwards. She studied in her early youth at the South Side Community Art Center, and Art Institute of Chicago. She continued her art studies into college and graduated in 1962 from University of Illinois at Urbana–Champaign. While attending University of Illinois at Urban–Champaign she took her first ceramics course and met her future husband, Curtis Tucker (1939–1992).

Tucker began her graduate studies at University of California, Los Angeles (UCLA) between 1962 and 1964, and later transferred to nearby Otis Art Institute to study ceramics where she graduated with a MFA degree in 1968. She studied with Helen Watson, Charles White, Joseph Mugnaini, Herman "Kofi" Bailey, and Michael Frimkess.

Together husband and wife team, Yvonne and Curtis collaborated on sculptures for over 20 years, until his death in 1992. They moved to Tallahassee, Florida in 1968. Together they developed a new technique called "Afro-Raku", combining contemporary, Native American, Eastern Asian, and African traditional ceramics methods.

== Artistic style and inspiration ==
Tucker utilizes semi-abstract, organic shapes to make up ceramic sculptures. The artist uses anthropomorphic forms that call to mind faces and body parts, imbuing a sense of mystery and power. Her studies of African and American Indian pit-firing techniques give her ceramic pieces shiny, burnished surfaces and a heavy use of the color black. The glazed works contrast with the burnished forms to create a sense of living forms created from simple mediums and practices.

The artist has said of her work: "The sculptural possibilities of utilitarian objects; pottery which reflects earthiness, mystery, and the spirituality of Man. In an effort to find the right balance between serenity and power, I gravitated inward toward my intuitive nature as well as outward toward African, Oriental, and American Indian cultures for inspiration."

== Honors and awards ==
- Anonymous Award for Ceramics, Otis Art Institute 50th Anniversary Exhibition, 1969
- Blue Ribbon, Clay Glaze Miami, 1970
- Best in Show, Clay Works, 1972
- Best in Show Award, Florida International University First Annual Art Fair, 1973
- Honorable Mention, Space Coast Art Festival 1974
- Top Honors in Ceramics, North Florida Fair 1975
- African-American Institute and Howard University, Educators to Africa Grant, 1975
- National Endowment for the Humanities, Summer Seminar for College Teachers, 1978
- Fine Arts Council of Florida Mini-Grant, 1979

== See also ==
- List of African-American visual artists
