= John Haslet =

American clergyman and soldier

- Born: c. 1727; Burnfoot, Ireland
- Died: 3 January 1777 (aged c. 50) Princeton, New Jersey, United States
- Allegiance: 1758 (Great Britain); 1776 (United Colonies); 1776-1777 (United States)
- Service years: 1758, 1776-1777
- Conflicts: French and Indian War; Forbes Expedition; American Revolutionary War; Battle of Long Island; Battle of White Plains; Battle of Trenton; Battle of Princeton †
- Education: University of Glasgow
- Children: Joseph, 1 other son and 2 daughters

John Haslet (c. 1727 – 3 January 1777) was an American Presbyterian clergyman and soldier from Milford, in Kent County, Delaware. He was a veteran of the French and Indian War and an officer of the Continental Army in the American Revolution, serving as the first Colonel of the 1st Delaware Regiment. He was killed in action at the Battle of Princeton.

== Early life and family ==
Haslet was born in Straw, Burnfoot, County Londonderry, in Ulster, Ireland, around 1727, son of Joseph and Ann Dykes Haslet. As the eldest son, he attended the University of Glasgow in Scotland, earned his degree in divinity in 1749 and was ordained a Presbyterian minister at Ballykelly, County Londonderry, in 1752. Around 1750, he married Shirley Stirling, daughter of the Presbyterian minister from Walworth, Ballykelly. They had a daughter Mary, called Polly, born around 1752. Shirley most likely died in childbirth, as Polly was raised by her uncle, Samuel Haslet and followed her father to America in 1765.

By 1764, he had settled near Milford, Delaware, and married Jemima Molleston, the widow of John Brinkle and sister of Henry Molleston. Records of the Presbyterian Historical Society of America do not show him as a preacher in America; rather he is commonly referred to as "doctor" Haslet, reference to his medical practice. In 1767, he bought a tract of land called "Longfield", now inside the northern limits of Milford just off Roosa Road. They had four children together, Ann, Jemima, John, and Joseph.

== French and Indian War ==
Arriving in North America in 1757, he served in the French and Indian War as a captain in the Pennsylvania militia. He was part of the Forbes Expedition that captured Fort Duquesne in November 1758. He wrote a letter describing the condition of the fort.

== American Revolutionary War ==
In response to the request of the Continental Congress, the Lower Counties Assembly raised the 1st Delaware Regiment, placing Haslet at its command on 19 January 1776, with the rank of colonel. Known as the "Delaware Continentals" or "Delaware Blues", they were from the second smallest state, but at some 800 men, were the largest battalion in the army. David McCullough in 1776 describes them as turned out in handsome red trimmed blue coats, white waistcoats, buckskin breeches, white woolen stockings, and carrying fine, 'lately imported' English muskets. Raised in early 1776, they went from north in July and August 1776, arriving in time to engage in the entire sequence of events surrounding the British capture of New York in 1776.

At the Battle of Long Island, the Delaware Regiment fought with Colonel William Smallwood's Marylanders. Many thought these were the two best regiments in the Continental Army. They fought under the command of Brigadier General William Alexander, Lord Stirling, and were responsible for holding the Gowanus Road, the far right of the Continental Army line. They were immediately south of Brooklyn, with New York Harbor to their right. On 27 August 1776, the British sent much of their army well to the east, and under cover of darkness, easily turned the left flank of the Continental Army. Only on the right did the American's hold their own. McCullough again relates how Haslet later described "how his 'Delawares' stood with 'determined countenance', on them all the while, and the enemy, 'though six times their number', not daring to attack". But they were nearly surrounded and, once ordered to leave, could only undertake a harrowing retreat by wading and swimming across Gowanus Bay. When the fighting began, Haslet was attending a court martial in Manhattan, but returned to the regiment in time for some of the fighting.

Retreating across Westchester County, Haslet's men won a victory over a corps of Loyalists at Mamaroneck, New York. At White Plains on 28 October 1776, the Delaware Regiment again fought with Colonel William Smallwood's Marylanders, reinforcing militia placed on the strategic Chatterton's Hill. The local militia fled under the British attack, but Haslet and Smallwood fought on until, at last, they too yielded the ground. The Battle of White Plains was another British victory, but because of the difficulty in taking Chatterton's Hill, the price was great and the reward to the British was little.

With expiring enlistments leaving fewer than 100 men remaining in his regiment, Haslet crossed the Delaware with Washington and joined the attack at the Battle of Trenton on the morning of 26 December 1776. However, on 3 January 1777, in a skirmish at the beginning of the Battle of Princeton, with General Hugh Mercer down and wounded, Haslet tried to rally Mercer's brigade and was himself shot in the head and killed instantly. Nevertheless, they did rally and a surprising victory was won to complement the earlier one at Trenton. The "corps of loyalists" he defeated at Mamaroneck was led by the famous native fighter Robert Rogers. Legend has it that Washington wept over his corpse on the battlefield and notes by Washington's stepson confirm that Washington did come across Haslet's body at Princeton, but does not mention any shedding of tears.

== Legacy ==
Haslet was first buried at the First Presbyterian Church cemetery in Philadelphia. By an act of the Delaware General Assembly on 1 July 1841, his remains were disinterred and moved to the Presbyterian Cemetery in Dover, Delaware. In 2001, the State of Delaware dedicated a monument to honor him at Battle Monument Park in Princeton, New Jersey.

John Haslet was perhaps the best soldier Delaware had to offer, and the next best soldier, his good friend Caesar Rodney, rushed to the Continental Army to try and fill his place. Haslet was succeeded as colonel by David Hall as Rodney returned home to be Delaware's wartime Governor, but the regiment Haslet had built remained among the finest in the Continental Army until it was virtually destroyed at the Battle of Camden in 1780.
