= Bellanca Skyrocket II =

1970s prototype American airplane

19-25 Skyrocket II
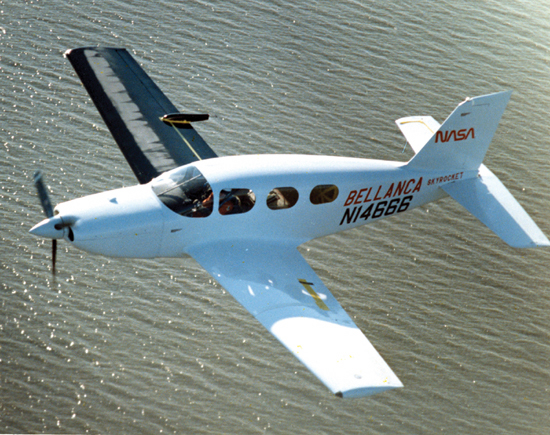
- Skyrocket II under aerodynamic evaluation by NASA.

General information
- Type: Utility aircraft
- Manufacturer: Bellanca Aircraft Engineering Inc.

History
- Manufactured: 1
- First flight: March 1975

The Bellanca 19-25 Skyrocket II was a prototype light airplane built in the United States in the 1970s. Despite its advanced design and exceptionally good performance, it never achieved certification or entered production.

== Development ==
The aircraft was the result of Giuseppe Bellanca's son, August Thomas Bellanca. Bellanca formed the Bellanca Aircraft Engineering Inc. company in Scott Depot, West Virginia to develop a new design conceived in 1957. The Skyrocket II was a six-seat, low-wing cantilever monoplane of conventional layout with retractable tricycle landing gear. It was made of composite materials, an advanced feature for its time, and test flying proved it to be fast. In 1975, within months of its first flight, the prototype claimed five world airspeed records for piston aircraft in its class. Three still stand in 2022:

Class C-1c (takeoff weight 1000 to 1750 kg): average 296 miles/hour on a 500-km circuit

Class C-1d (weight 1750 to 3000 kg): average 326 mph on a 500-km circuit and 314 mph on a 1000-km circuit

The aircraft attracted the attention of NASA, which conducted an aerodynamic analysis of the design, investigating natural laminar flow as a factor of its high performance.

Plans to produce the aircraft commercially were scrapped due to the downturn in the civil aviation market in the United States in the early 1980s. In the mid-1990s, the design was developed into a kit and sold as the Skyrocket III to help fund a new certification programme. The Skyrocket III features greater speed, payload and range and was re-engineered for modular construction. By 1998 eleven kits had been delivered, but it is uncertain if any were completed and flown.

== Surviving aircraft ==
The prototype Skyrocket II was displayed at the Delaware Aviation Museum in Georgetown, Delaware, but later moved to the Bellanca Airfield Museum in New Castle, Delaware.

== Specifications (Skyrocket II) ==
Data from Jane's All The World's Aircraft 1976–77.

General characteristics

- Crew: one
- Capacity: five passengers
- Length: 27 ft 5.6 in (8.372 m) Tip of spinner to tail
- Wingspan: 34 ft 10.7 in (10.635 m)
- Height: 9 ft 3 in (2.82 m)
- Wing area: 182.6 sq ft (16.96 m^{2})
- Aspect ratio: 6.667
- Airfoil: NACA 63_{2}215
- Empty weight: 2,300 lb (1,043 kg)
- Max takeoff weight: 4,100 lb (1,860 kg)
- Powerplant: 1 × Continental GTSIO-520-F air-cooled flat-six, 435 hp (324 kW)
- Propellers: 3-bladed

Performance

- Maximum speed: 331 mph (533 km/h, 288 kn) at 29,000 ft (8,800 m)
- Cruise speed: 255 mph (410 km/h, 222 kn) at 15,000 ft (4,600 m), 65% power
- Stall speed: 65 mph (105 km/h, 56 kn) flaps down
- Range: 1,465 mi (2,358 km, 1,273 nmi)
- Service ceiling: 30,000 ft (9,100 m)
- Rate of climb: 1,900 ft/min (9.7 m/s)
- Wing loading: 24.45 lb/sq ft (119.4 kg/m^{2})
- Power/mass: 0.106
