= Delaware State Museum Buildings =

- U.S. National Register of Historic Places
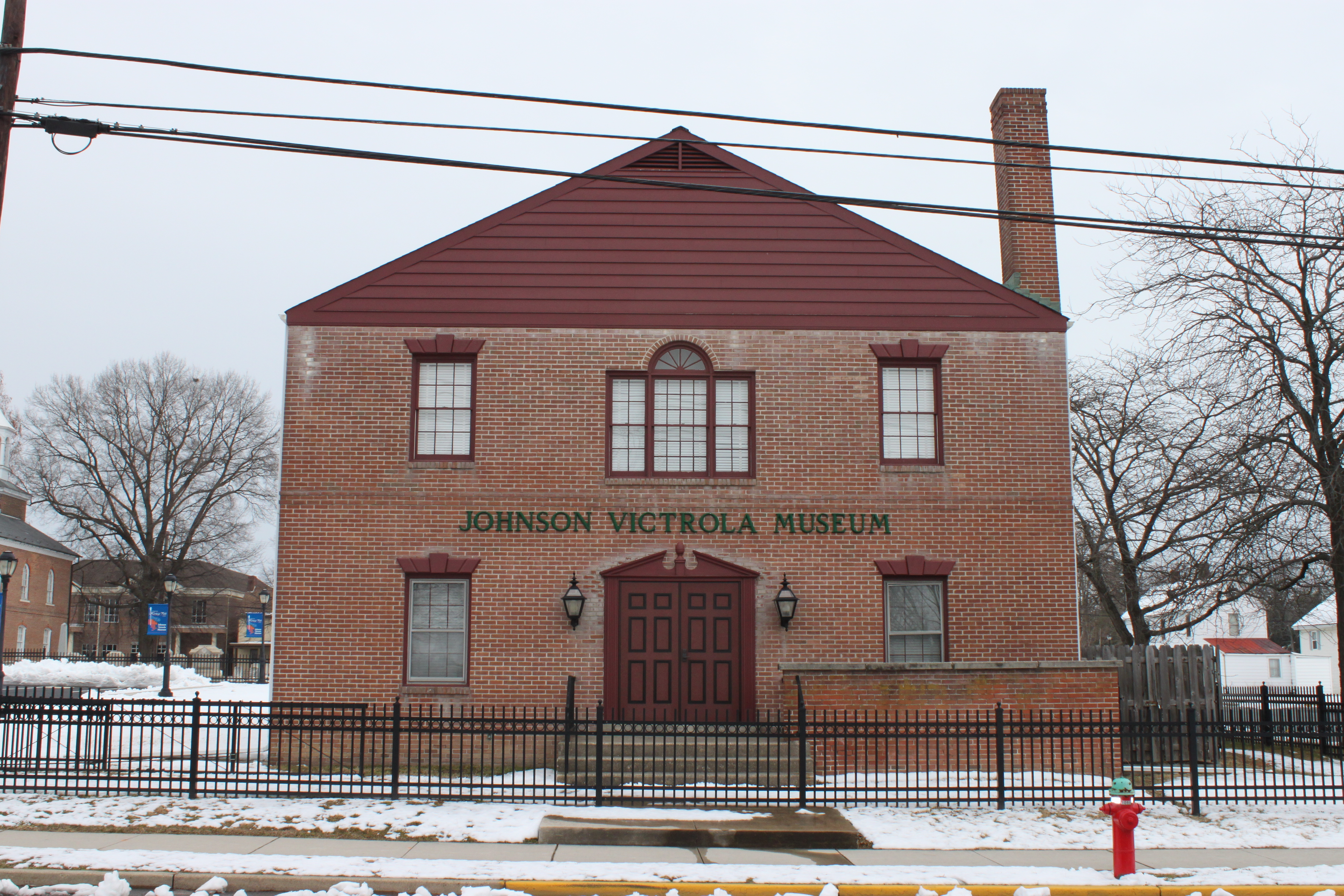
- Johnson Victrola Museum, January 2011

- Location within Delaware Location within the United States
- Location: 316 S. Governors Ave., Dover, Delaware
- Coordinates: 39°9′22″N 75°31′39″W
- Area: 2.6 acres (1.1 ha)
- Built: 1790
- Architectural style: Georgian, Federal
- NRHP reference No.: 72000278
- Added to NRHP: February 1, 1972

Delaware State Museum Buildings, also known as Old Presbyterian Church Complex, is a historic museum complex located in Dover, Delaware. The complex consists of four buildings. They are the Old Presbyterian Church, brick chapel (1880), brick gas plant office building, and the Georgian-style Eldridge Reeves Johnson Memorial Building. The Old Presbyterian Church was built in 1790, and is a two-story, three bay square brick early Federal style meeting house. Buried in the adjacent cemetery are a number of prominent Delawareans including John M. Clayton (1796–1856) and John Haslet (c. 1727–1777). The Eldridge Reeves Johnson Memorial Building houses the Johnson Victrola Museum.

It was added to the National Register of Historic Places in 1972.

== Description ==
The Delaware State Museum is located on the designated Meeting House Square in Dover, which was originally established in 1717. It encompasses four buildings, each with its own unique history and architectural features.

The first building, known as Building No. 1, is the Old Presbyterian Church. Built in 1790, the structure stands as a remarkable illustration of an early Federal brick meetinghouse. With a three-bay width and a nearly square shape, this two-story building also features an attic and a belfry that houses an enclosed stairwell, which is an unusual characteristic. Although the octagonal cupola that once protected the bell was removed in the nineteenth century, leaving a truncated tower, it has since been restored. The exterior remains true to its original condition, while the interior boasts impressive paneling, the distinctive staircase mentioned earlier, and a spacious gallery with a railing. These original elements have been preserved and incorporated into the structure's adaptation as a museum. Additionally, a box pew from the past was discovered in storage and has been reinstalled as an exhibit. The Old Presbyterian Church still retains its well-maintained burial ground, adding to its historical significance.

Building No. 2 is a brick chapel built in 1880. Its exterior and high Gothic ceiling have remained unaltered, representing a well-preserved architectural style.

On the other hand, Building No. 3 does not belong to the church complex but rather served as the office for a gas plant that occupied half of the block during the late nineteenth and early twentieth centuries. This sturdy one-story brick building, also from the late nineteenth century, stands independently within the museum premises.

Lastly, Building No. 4, named the Eldridge Reeves Johnson Memorial Building, is a recently constructed structure featuring an attractive Georgian design.

The Delaware State Museum, along with its accompanying parking lot, now occupies the entire block bordered by Governors Avenue, Bank Lane, North Street, and New Street. The surrounding neighborhood, which was predominantly commercial and interspersed with deteriorating housing, has experienced a gradual revitalization since the demolition of the gas works in approximately 1955. The ongoing improvement is further accelerated by the construction of a well-designed city police headquarters in close proximity and the scheduled development of a Federal Building directly across the street.

== Significance ==
The Old Presbyterian Church stands as a remarkable representation of religious architecture from the Federal period. For 134 years, it served as the first congregation of its denomination in Kent County, playing a vital role in the ethical and educational advancement of the town and county since 1714. The churchyard is the final resting place of distinguished individuals, including John M. Clayton (1796–1856), a renowned jurist, statesman, and former United States Secretary of State. Another notable figure buried here is Colonel John Haslet, who commanded the Delaware Battalion during the Revolution until his demise at the Battle of Trenton in January 1777.

During the pastorate of Rev. John Miller (d. 1791), the present Museum Building No. 1 was constructed, and it was later briefly succeeded by his son Rev. Samuel Miller, who went on to become a distinguished professor at Princeton. This building hosted a state constitutional convention in 1831, while an earlier convention in 1791–92, featuring the influential figure of John Dickinson, may have also taken place there.

Moving on to Buildings No. 2 and 3, though they lack the architectural significance of the Church, they still serve as fine examples of a small town church edifice and a small industrial building from the later nineteenth century. Together, the three units house numerous exhibits that offer insight into various aspects of Delaware life and history, attracting several thousand visitors each year. Notably, the Johnson Building is dedicated to showcasing the history of sound recording as pioneered by the Victor Talking Machine Company.

== See also ==
- Delaware lunar sample displays
