= Indian River Life-Saving Station =

- Indian River Life Saving Service Station
- U.S. National Register of Historic Places
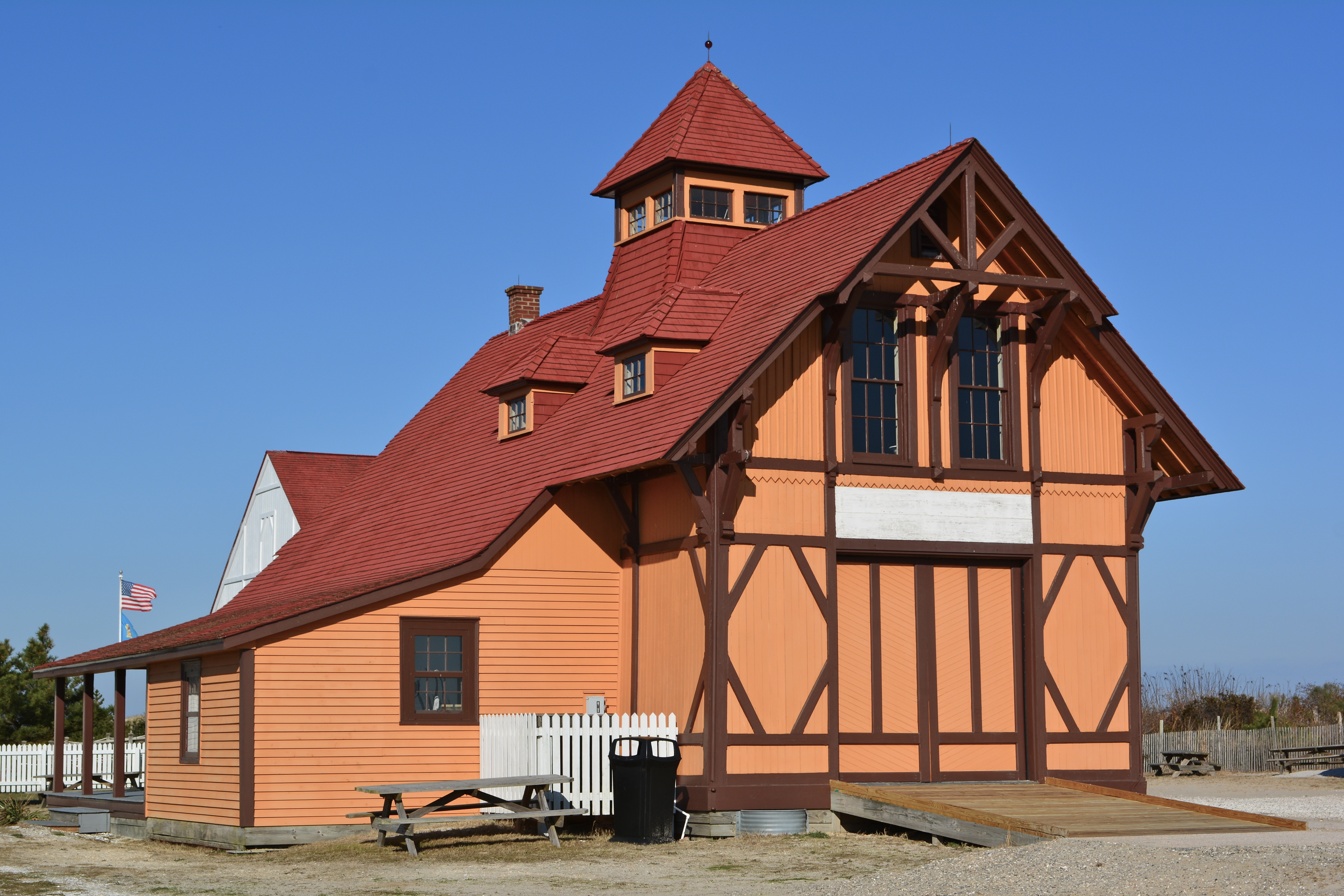

- Location within Delaware Location within the United States
- Nearest city: Rehoboth Beach, Delaware
- Coordinates: 38°38′1″N 75°4′3″W
- Area: less than one acre
- Built: 1880
- NRHP reference No.: 76000582
- Added to NRHP: September 29, 1976

The Indian River Life-Saving Station was established between Bethany Beach and Rehoboth Beach, Delaware in 1880 to rescue mariners shipwrecked along the Delaware coast, as part of the United States Life-Saving Service. It was designed in 1874 as a 1 1/2-story board-and-batten frame structure with decorative brackets supporting overhanging eaves in a version of the Queen Anne style. It sheltered a surfboat which could be quickly rolled out through double doors facing the beach and down a ramp to the water. The main station house remains of what was once a complex that included a barn, stable, meat house, feed house and privy. An auxiliary boathouse stood about a mile to the south. The original plans for the station survive.

The facility was moved back from the water's edge due to coastal erosion. In 1915, the United States Life-Saving Service merged with the Revenue Cutter Service to form the United States Coast Guard. The station was converted to a Coast Guard station and occupied until the Ash Wednesday Storm of 1962, which left it partially buried in sand. A new Coast Guard station was built nearby in 1964. The original station was restored by the Delaware Seashore Preservation Foundation, and is now operated as the Indian River Life-Saving Station Museum by Delaware State Parks, as part of Delaware Seashore State Park.

The Indian River Life Saving Service Station was placed on the National Register of Historic Places on September 29, 1976.

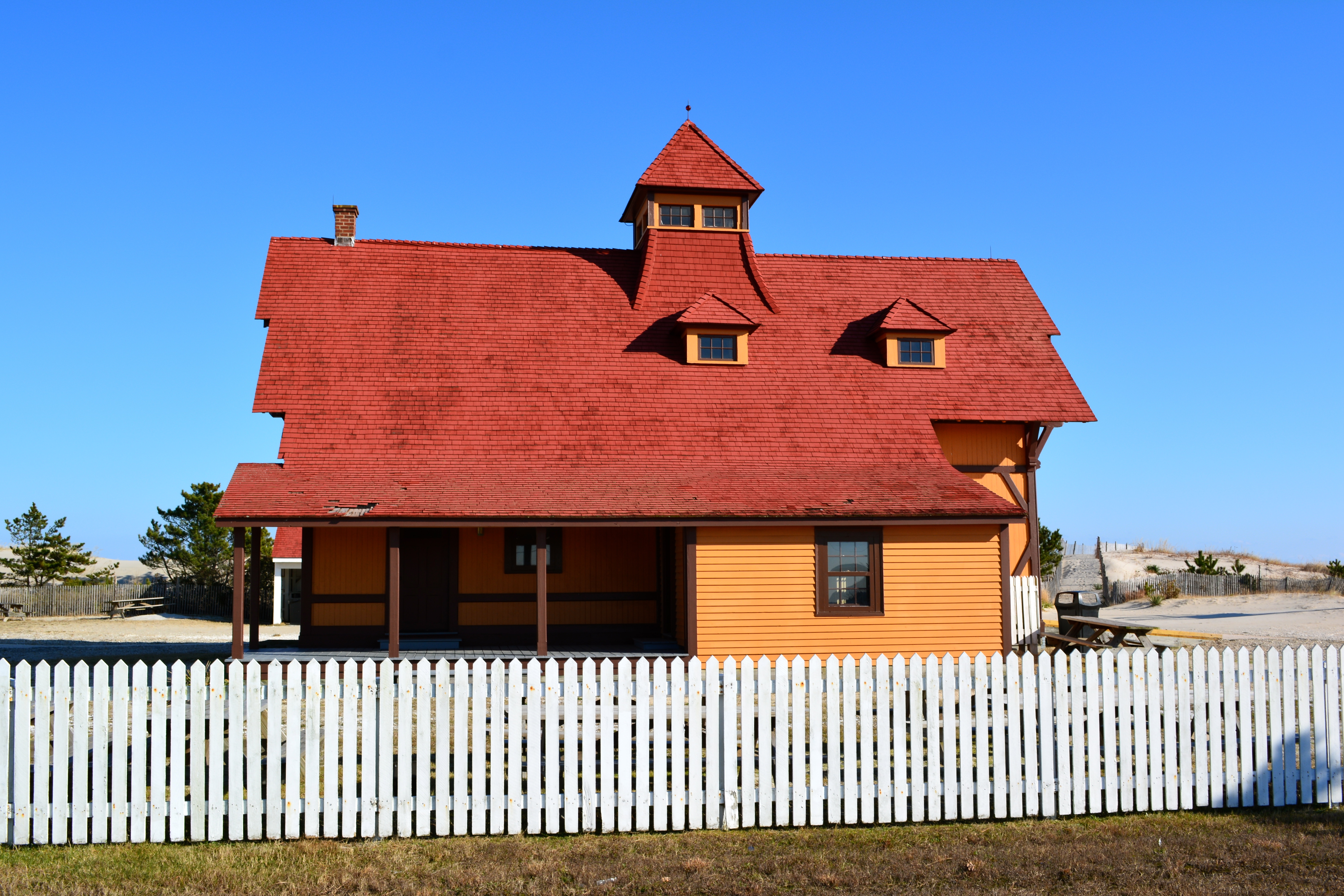

== See also ==
- List of museums in Delaware
- United States Coast Guard History and Heritage Sites
- National Register of Historic Places listings in Sussex County, Delaware
