= First State Heritage Park =

State park in Delaware, United States

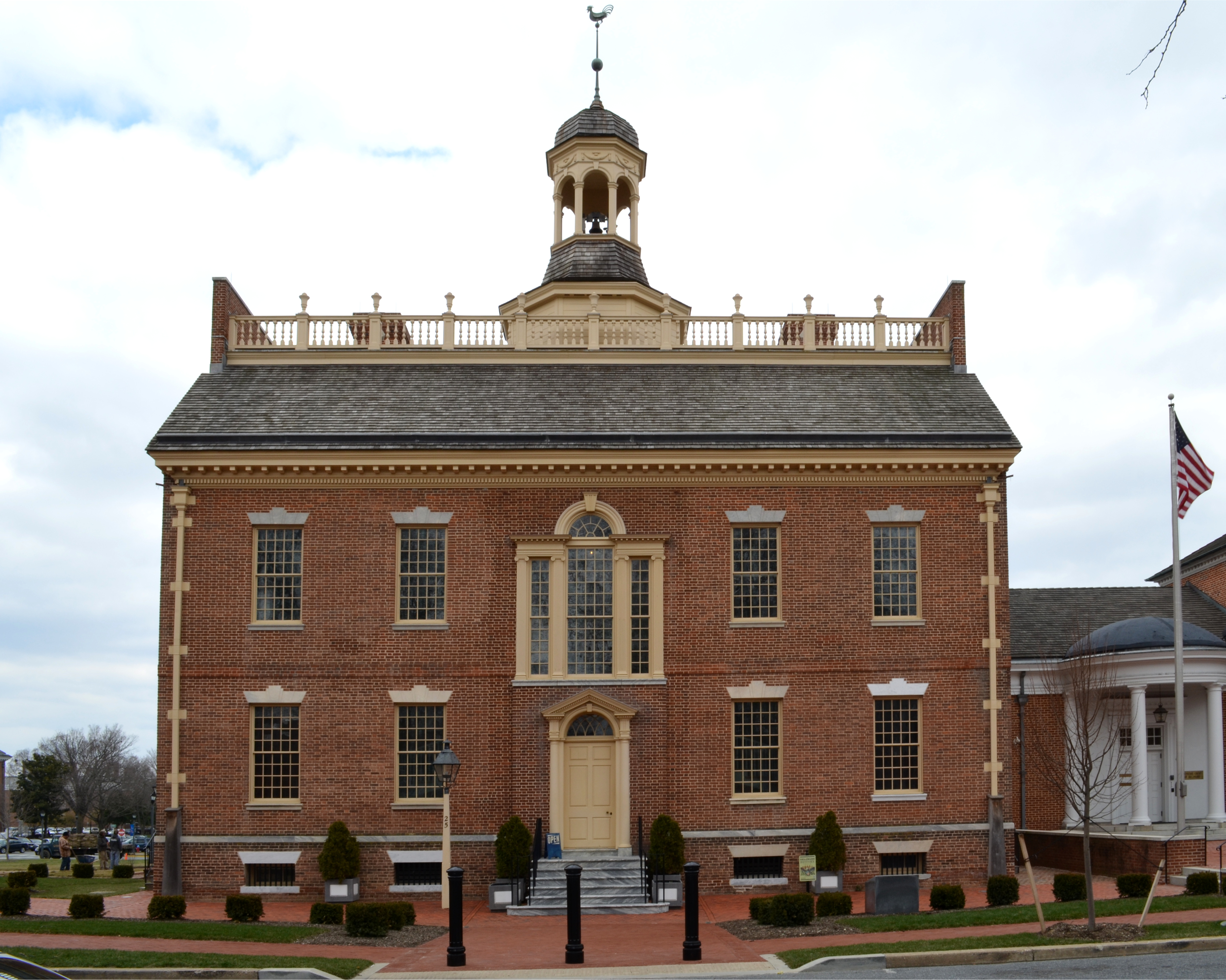
- Old State House

- Location within Delaware Location within the United States
- Location: Dover, Delaware, United States
- Coordinates: 39°09′29″N 75°31′29″W
- Elevation: 36 ft (11 m)
- Established: 2004
- Administrator: Delaware Department of Natural Resources and Environmental Control
- Website: Official website

First State Heritage Park is an urban "park without boundaries" linking historic and cultural sites in Dover, Delaware, the city that has been the seat of state government since 1777. The park is a partnership of state and city agencies under the leadership of Delaware State Parks. Delaware was the first state to ratify the United States Constitution.

== Historic and cultural sites ==
The sites of the park highlight Delaware's role as the First State. They were organized as a state park in 2004 by Governor Ruth Ann Minner, as a partnership between the Delaware Economic Development Office, the Delaware Department of State, and the Delaware Department of Natural Resources and Environmental Control.

The sites of the park are First State Heritage Park Welcome Center and Galleries, the Old State House, Delaware Legislative Hall, John Bell House, Delaware Public Archives, Johnson Victrola Museum, Delaware Governor's Mansion, and the Biggs Museum of American Art.

=== Welcome Center and Galleries ===
Located within the Delaware Public Archives building adjacent to Legislative Hall, the First State Heritage Park Welcome Center & Galleries serves as an entrance portal to Delaware's state capital and the historic city of Dover.

=== The Old State House ===
The Old State House served as the state's first permanent capitol building from 1791 until 1932. It is located on Dover's historic green. The Old State House originally housed Delaware's state government and the government of Kent County. The Old Statehouse was listed on the National Register of Historic Places in 1971.

The State House has undergone several expansions and renovations since it opened in 1791. It was originally built in a Georgian architecture style. The state house was remodeled in 1873 to reflect a Victorian style and restored in 1976 to its original appearance. Extensive renovations of the State House also took place in 2007.

=== Delaware Legislative Hall ===
Legislative Hall is the state capitol building. It houses offices and the assembly room for the Delaware State Legislature. Legislative Hall has served as the main legislative building since 1933.

=== John Bell House ===
The John Bell house is a one-room home that historians believe was built as a workshop with an original footprint of 16 feet by 25 feet, with a small basement and attic. During restoration efforts that started in 2010, the date of 1743 was found punched into a stud with an awl, but the building is believed to be older than that. Prior to the restoration the building had additions added and used as law offices for George Valentine Massey and Nathaniel B. Smithers, as well as a post office from 1818 to 1825 before it was acquired by the state of Delaware.

=== Delaware Public Archives ===
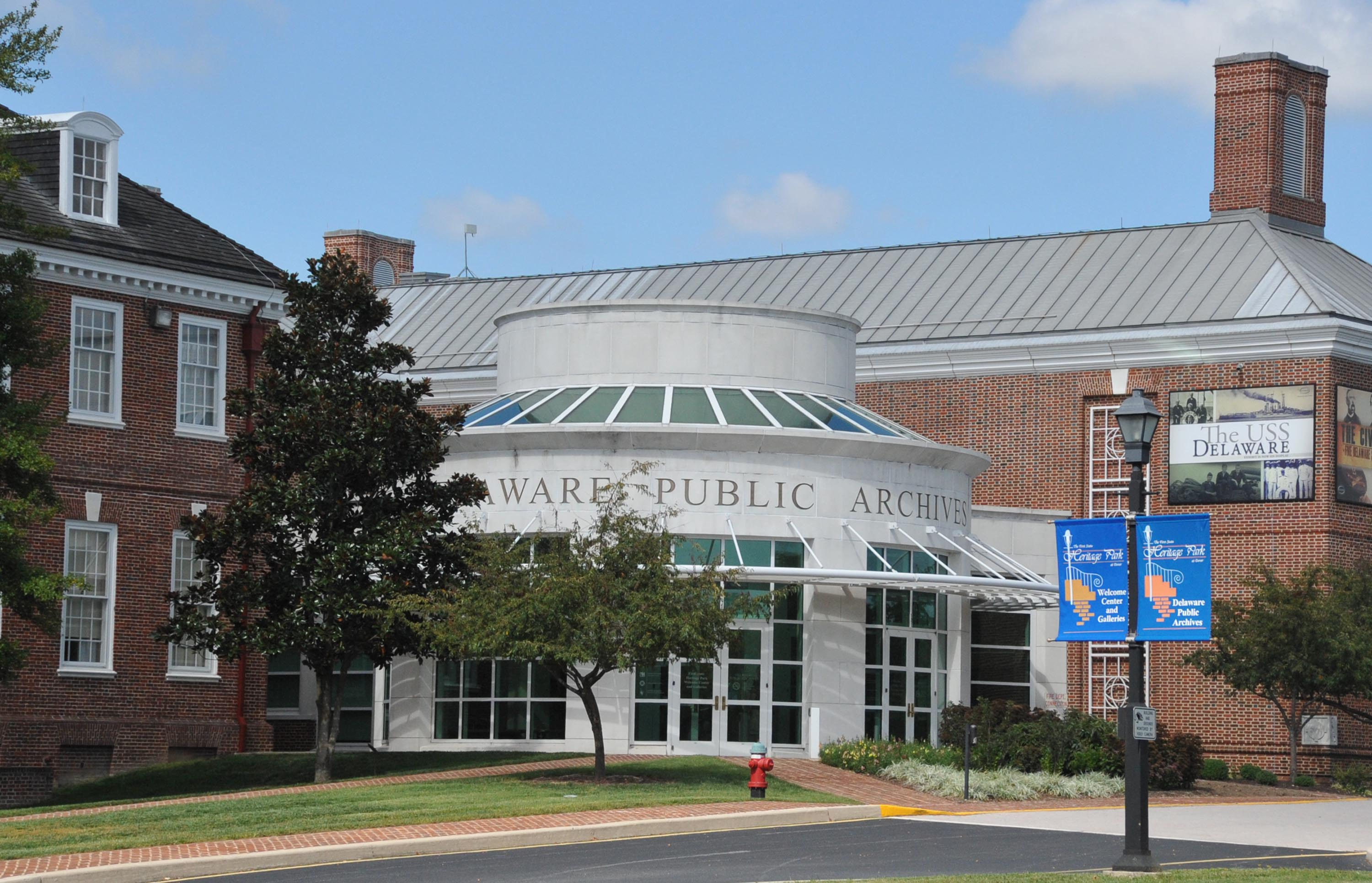
Delaware Public Archives

The Delaware Public Archives building houses an extensive collection of materials dating from the 17th century to today and a public research room.

=== Johnson Victrola Museum ===
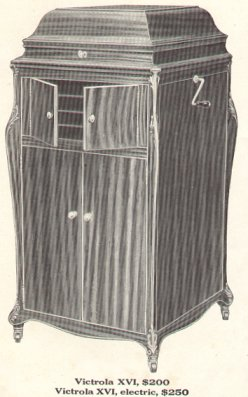
The Victrola developed by Eldridge R. Johnson.

The Johnson Victrola Museum was built in honor of Eldridge R. Johnson, founder of the Victor Talking Machine Company. Exhibits at the museum include paintings, objects, memorabilia, and trademarks that highlight the development of the sound recording industry. The museum is part of the Delaware State Museum Buildings complex, listed on the National Register of Historic Places in 1972.

=== Biggs Museum of American Art ===
The Biggs Museum of American Art houses a permanent collection of American fine and decorative arts as well as changing exhibitions throughout the year.

=== Woodburn and Hall House ===
Woodburn, the official residence of Delaware's Governor, Hall House, the Governor's guest house; and their gardens offer regular tours.
