= Paul R. Jones =

American activist (1928–2010)

Paul Raymond Jones (June 1, 1928 – January 26, 2010) was an American collector of African American art.

Jones, one of five children of Will and Ella Jones, grew up in Muscoda, a Tennessee Coal, Iron and Railroad Company mining camp near Bessemer, Alabama. After his mother formed a favorable impression of Northern schools while visiting the 1939 New York World's Fair, he was sent off to continue his education there. He returned to Alabama during high school and attended Alabama State University on scholarship. He was elected president of his freshman class and played on the Bulldogs football team. After two years he decided to pursue the study of law. He transferred to Howard University in Washington D. C. to complete his undergraduate studies. His application to the University of Alabama Law School in 1949 was officially discouraged on the basis of race. He completed a year of graduate work at Howard before returning to Bessemer.

In the 1960s, Jones was part of the "Birmingham Interracial Committee" of the "Jefferson County Coordinating Council for Social Forces" and later worked for the United States Department of Justice on Civil Rights issues and later the Department of Housing and Urban Development, where he was recognized for his work on the Model Cities Program. He also served as deputy director of the Peace Corps in Thailand.

In the early 1960s, Jones was inspired by the annual African-American art shows organized by Hale Woodruff at Atlanta University. He began collecting works by African-American artists, often befriending the younger artists from whom he purchased works. He hosted receptions at his home to encourage colleagues to purchase art and put pressure on galleries and museums to recognize African-American artwork.

Jones eventually amassed an important collection with over 2,000 pieces. A selection of his collection made its public debut in a 1993 exhibition at the University of Delaware. In 2001 Jones donated hundreds of the more valuable works to that University with several stipulations for how the school should leverage it to provide more opportunities for black students and art professionals. In 2008 he donated most of his remaining collection, 1,700 works, to the University of Alabama.

Jones, who lived in Atlanta, died in January 2010. He was survived by a son.
