= Bellanca Airfield =

Historic airfield in Delaware, US

- Air Service, Inc. Hangar at Bellanca Airfield
- U.S. National Register of Historic Places
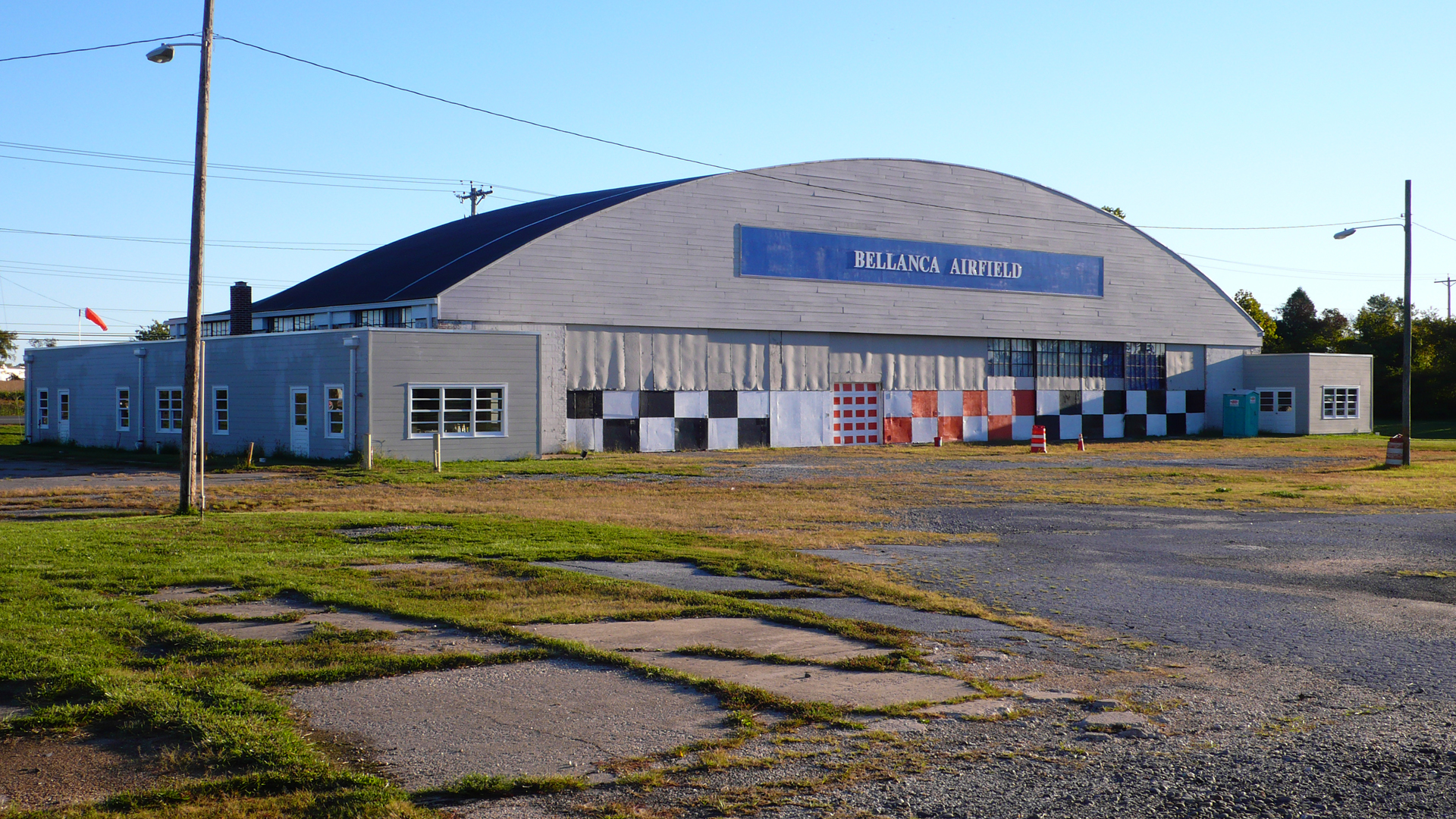
- Air Service, Inc. Hangar in 2012

- Location within Delaware Location within the United States
- Location: 2 Centerpoint Blvd., New Castle, Delaware
- Coordinates: 39.664307°N 75.586928°W
- Area: 2.7 acres (1.1 ha)
- Built: 1936
- Built by: James Mullens; John E. Healy & Sons
- Architectural style: Aircraft Hangar
- NRHP reference No.: 05000601
- Added to NRHP: June 15, 2005

The Bellanca Airfield was an airfield, aircraft plant, and service hangar built in 1928 by Giuseppe Bellanca and Henry B. DuPont in New Castle, Delaware, United States. Located off Route 273 near the Delaware River, the plant produced approximately 3000 aircraft before closing in 1954.

The only surviving part of the airfield is the former Air Service, Inc. hangar, which was listed on the National Register of Historic Places in 2005.

== History ==
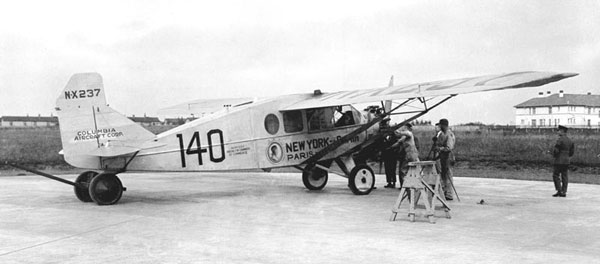
Wright-Bellanca WB-2 Columbia

Bellanca immigrated from Italy in 1912 and continued his passion for aircraft design in the United States. His aircraft achieved numerous endurance and efficiency records. His $25,000 Wright-Bellanca WB-2 monoplane, Columbia, had been the first choice of Charles Lindbergh for his trans-Atlantic flight. On April 25, 1927, Clarence Chamberlin and Bert Acosta set the world endurance record for aircraft, staying aloft circling New York City for 51 hours, 11 minutes, and 25 seconds and covering 4,100 miles, more than the 3,600 mile from New York to Paris. Time magazine reported on April 25, 1927:

Engineer Giuseppe M. Bellanca of the Columbia Aircraft Corporation had conditioned an elderly yellow-winged monoplane with one Wright motor, and scouted around for pilots. Lieut. Leigh Wade, round-the-world flyer, declined the invitation, saying Mr. Bellanca's plans were too stunt-like, not scientific. Shrugging, Mr. Bellanca engaged Pilots Clarence Duncan Chamberlin and burly Bert Acosta, onetime auto speedster, to test his ship's endurance. Up they put from Mitchel Field, Long Island, with 385 gallons of ethylated (high power) gasoline. All day they droned back and forth over suburbia, circled the Woolworth Building, hovered over Hadley Field, New Jersey, swung back to drop notes on Mitchell Field. All that starry night they wandered slowly around the sky, and all the next day, and through the next night, a muggy, cloudy one. Newsgatherers flew up alongside to shout unintelligible things through megaphones. Messrs. Acosta and Chamberlain were looking tired and oil-blobbed. They swallowed soup and sandwiches, caught catnaps on the mattressed fuel tank, while on and on they droned, almost lazily (about 80 m.p.h.) for they were cruising against time. Not for 51 hours, 11 minutes, 25 seconds, did they coast to earth, having broken the U.S. and world's records for protracted flight. In the same time, conditions favoring, they could have flown from Manhattan to Vienna. They had covered 4,100 miles. To Paris it is 3,600 miles from Manhattan. Jubilant, Engineer Bellanca's employers offered competitors a three-hour headstart in the race to Paris. The Bellanca monoplane's normal cruising speed is 110 m.p.h. She would require only some 35 hours to reach Paris—if she could stay up that long again.

Lindbergh had been unable to get the plane, and commissioned the Ryan Airline Company of San Diego to build the Spirit of St. Louis to his own design. Two weeks after Lindbergh's flight, the Columbia flew non-stop from New York City to Berlin, Germany, a trip of 3,911 miles compared to the 3,600 mile route Lindbergh made from New York City to Paris to capture the Orteig Prize.

The Air Service, Inc. Hangar at Bellanca Airfield was built about 1936, and is built predominately of concrete block with brick detailing at door openings and at the locations of the piers that support the wood roof trusses. It measures 60 feet by 180 feet, and is the only surviving piece of aviation history left at the former Bellanca Airfield.

== See also ==
- Bellanca Airfield Museum
- National Register of Historic Places listings in northern New Castle County, Delaware
