= Edward L. Loper Sr. =

American painter

- Loper circa 1947.
- Born: Edward Leroy Loper; April 7, 1916; Wilmington, DE
- Died: October 11, 2011 (aged 95); Wilmington, DE
- Education: Barnes Foundation
- Known for: Painting
- Movement: Impressionism; Colourist painting
- Spouse(s): Viola Virginia Cooper (1935-44); Claudine Bruton (1945-1986); Janet Neville-Loper (1986-2011)
- Children: 3

Edward Leroy Loper Sr. (April 7, 1916 – October 11, 2011) was an African American artist and teacher from Delaware, best known for his vibrant palette and juxtaposition of colors. He taught painting for almost 70 years.

== Early life and education ==
Loper was born to a poor family on the east side of Wilmington, Delaware, in a racially mixed section known as Frogtown. At the time of his birth, his mother was 16. Loper was raised primarily by his maternal grandmother. Growing up, he did not receive formal artistic training. He attended Howard High School, where he was an All-State football and basketball player. At the time, this was the only high school in Delaware that African Americans were allowed to attend. After graduating from high school in 1934, he had to forego an athletic scholarship at Lincoln University in Pennsylvania to start working in order to help his family financially.

== Career ==
My Father The Bishop Oil on canvas, 48" x 36", 1975 University of Delaware

=== Artist beginnings ===
In 1936, during the Great Depression, Loper started working in Delaware for the Works Progress Administration (WPA), rendering drawings of decorative art for the Index of American Design, a large archive of folk art images based in Washington, DC. The job required him to illustrate images of objects in American design such as toys and furniture. He produced 113 of them in total. He later credited the job with giving him his start as an artist. Three of his renderings (a Windsor chair, a toy bank and a cast-iron fire screen) were later included in the Index of Modern Design's 2002 exhibition, Drawing on America's Past: Folk Art, Modernism and the Index of American Design. The index is currently housed at the National Gallery of Art in Washington, DC.

Loper was encouraged to paint by his WPA co-worker Walter Pyle, the nephew of illustrator and author Howard Pyle. Loper began studying Howard Pyle's work at the Wilmington Public Library. He began taking the train to the Philadelphia Museum of Art on weekends, studying painting's great masters; self-taught, he slowly developed his own style and technique. He was employed by the Works Progress Administration Art Project from 1936–41, and at the Allied Kid leather tanning factory until 1947, at which point he became a full-time artist and teacher.

=== Painting ===
In 1937, Loper became the first African American to have a painting accepted by the Wilmington Society of the Fine Arts (now the Delaware Art Museum). His painting After a Shower, a depiction of Wilmington on a stormy night, won honorable mention at a 1938 exhibition of the Wilmington Society of the Fine Arts, and was later purchased by the society for its permanent collection. He was profiled in Howard University professor Alain Locke's landmark 1940 book The Negro in Art. In 1941, he exhibited a painting at the University of Delaware. At the time, African Americans were not allowed to attend the university.

In the 1940s, Loper painted mostly landscapes and cityscapes of his neighborhood in Wilmington, in vivid colors. By the early 1950s, with a growing appreciation of the works of Pablo Picasso, Loper had transitioned from creating self-described mood paintings to concentrating on color and shapes, including experimenting with a kind of kaleidoscopic cubism, refracting subjects into planes as if seen through shards of glass.

Loper's artistic direction was solidified in 1963, after he was invited to attend classes at the Barnes Foundation in Merion, Pennsylvania, established by Albert C. Barnes in 1922 and home to one of the world's largest private art collections. He was first invited to study there when he met Barnes in 1946, but declined the original offer, as he was recently married with young children to care for. He was taught by Violette de Mazia to carefully analyze classical techniques at the Barnes Foundation from 1963 to 1968. When he saw Paul Cézanne's The Boy in the Red Vest, it changed the way he thought about color, having a major effect on the use and juxtaposition of color in his work. He was heavily influenced by his study of the art at the Barnes Foundation. Loper's work of the 1960s and beyond became more dramatically structured, colorful and refracted than his earlier work.

The Delaware Art Museum organized Loper's first retrospective in 1996, Edward L. Loper: From the Prism's Edge, covering 60 years of his work. In 2007, the University of Delaware presented The Art of Edward Loper, Sr.: On the Path of the Masters, a comprehensive retrospective.

=== Teaching ===
34 St. Pierre, Quebec Oil on canvas, 36" x 30", 1980 Private collection, Austin, TX

Loper started teaching painting in 1940. Starting in the late 1940s, to escape some of the racism he experienced at home, he began traveling to Quebec City in Canada, where he would paint boldly-colored cityscapes. He began taking his students there every summer starting in the 1960s. Over the years he would teach at the Allied Kid Company, Delaware Art Museum, Delaware College of Art and Design, Lincoln University, Jewish Community Center in Wilmington, and finally, classes at his studio. As a teacher, Loper was known for his charismatic, intense and demanding demeanor.

== Legacy ==
Following his death, Delaware Today wrote of Loper, "Few local painters have achieved his level of recognition and influence, here and beyond, or have been as beloved by so many students." On November 1, 2011, Delaware senators Thomas R. Carper and Christopher A. Coons memorialized Loper as part of the Congressional Record. Carper stated that Loper's "talent for color broke the mold of his time, and his passion for teaching others to see through color was unsurpassed," adding that he "changed the landscape for black artists and paved the way for others who came after him."

The University of Delaware inherited all of Loper's work in his possession at the time of his death. His paintings are in the permanent collections of the University Museums at the University of Delaware's Paul R. Jones Collection of African-American Art, National Gallery of Art, Smithsonian American Art Museum, Philadelphia Museum of Art, Pennsylvania Academy of the Fine Arts, Delaware Art Museum, Howard University, Corcoran Gallery of Art, Wilmington Society of the Fine Arts, Clark-Atlanta University Collection of African-American Art, Biggs Museum in Delaware, Christina Cultural Arts Center, Muscarelle Museum of Art, and the Museum of African American Art in Tampa, Florida. A Loper painting hangs in the Delaware governor's mansion, and two of Loper's paintings hung in Vice President Joe Biden's official residence at Number One Observatory Circle in Washington, DC.

An oral history interview with Loper conducted on March 26, 1964 is housed at the Smithsonian Institution's Archives of American Art. Also in the archives are his papers from 1965 to 1988, and an oral history interview from May 12, 1989. Edward Loper: Prophet of Color, a 35-minute documentary created for Teleduction, won a Mid-Atlantic Emmy Award for Outstanding Documentary Program in 2000. In 2013, the Hagley Museum and Library produced a 22-minute documentary, Edward Loper: African American Painter, based on a 1998 interview with the artist.

== Personal life ==
Loper lived in Wilmington, Delaware for his entire life. He and his first wife, Viola Virginia Cooper, married in 1935. She died from a ruptured ectopic pregnancy in 1944. They had three children. In 1945, he married Claudine Bruton. They later divorced. He and Janet Neville were married in 1986, and were together until his death in 2011. Loper's son, Edward Loper Jr., is also an accomplished painter.

In 1950, Loper designed and built a three-bedroom ranch house in Wilmington. The Lopers bought the parcel of land for $100 in 1941. In designing the house, he was influenced by Frank Lloyd Wright and Japanese architecture. In the living room, Loper painted a wall mural of female figures. The garage was converted into a studio, where Loper gave weekly art lessons in his later years.

== Exhibitions (selected) ==
- Whyte Gallery, Washington, DC, 1938
- Solo exhibition, Howard High School, Wilmington, DE, 1939
- Art of the American Negro (1851-1940), American Negro Exposition, Chicago, IL, 1940
- Solo exhibition, University of Delaware, 1941
- Solo exhibitions, Carlen Gallery, Philadelphia, PA, 1941, 1947
- The Negro Artist Comes of Age, Albany Institute of History and Art, Albany, NY, 1945
- Two-man exhibition with Andrew Wyeth, University of Delaware, Newark, DE, 1949
- Solo exhibition, Warehouse Gallery, Arden, DE, 1957
- Paintings and Sculpture by Frank DelleDonne, Edward Loper, and Charles Parks, Wilmington Society of Fine Arts, 1960
- Solo exhibition, Baltimore Museum of Art, Baltimore, MD, 1965
- Solo exhibition, Little Studio, New York, NY, 1967
- Solo exhibition, West Chester University, West Chester, PA, 1969
- Edward Loper Sr./Edward Loper Jr. exhibition, Delaware Art Museum, 1971
- Solo exhibition, La Galerie Zanettin, Quebec City, Quebec, 1980
- Solo exhibition, Hardcastle Gallery, Wilmington, DE, 1990
- A Tribute to the Teacher, Christina Cultural Center, Wilmington, DE, 1995
- Edward L. Loper: From the Prism's Edge, Delaware Art Museum, Wilmington, DE, 1996
- Drawing on America's Past: Folk Art, Modernism and the Index of American Design, Index of Modern Design, Washington, DC, 2002
- African-American Art: 20th Century Masterworks, VII, Michael Rosenfeld Gallery, New York, NY, 2000
- The Art of Edward Loper, Sr.: On the Path of the Masters, University Museums at the University of Delaware, Newark, DE, 2007
- The Edward L. Loper, Sr. Collection: A Centennial Exhibition, University Museums at the University of Delaware, Newark, DE, 2016
- The Loper Tradition: Paintings by Edward Loper, Sr. and Edward Loper, Jr., Delaware Art Museum, 2019.

== Honors and awards ==
- Honorable mention, Annual Delaware Show, Wilmington Society of Fine Arts, 1937
- Second place award, Twelfth Street Garden, Clark Atlanta University, 1942
- Honorable mention, Annual Delaware Show, Wilmington Society of Fine Arts, 1943
- Yarnell Abbott prize, Philadelphia Art Alliance, Philadelphia, PA, 1944
- First prize, Under the Highline, Wilmington Society of Fine Arts, 1947
- Outstanding Delaware Black Citizen Award, University of Delaware, 1980
- Achievement Award, Christina Cultural Arts Center, 1986
- Outstanding Black Delawarean, Delaware State College, 1986
- Edward Loper Sr. Day, Delaware, April 7, 1996
- Governor's Award for the Arts, Delaware State Arts Council, 1998
- Honorary Doctorate of Fine Arts, Delaware State University, 1998
- Art Educators of Delaware Honoree, Delaware Art Museum, Wilmington, Delaware, 2001
- Honorary Degree of Humanities, University of Delaware, 2004
- Lifetime Achievement Award, NAACP, 2004
- Ambassador of Goodwill Award, City of Wilmington, DE, 2004

== Bibliography ==
=== Art books ===
- Edward L. Loper: From the Prism's Edge (Delaware Art Museum, 1996)
- The Art of Seeing: Selected Masterworks of Edward L. Loper, Sr. (Asgard Press, 1999)
- The Art of Edward L. Loper, Sr.: On the Path of the Masters (University Museums of the University of Delaware, 2007)

=== Biography ===
- Marilyn A. Bauman, The Prophet of Color: A Disciple's Reflections (APU Publishing Group, 1999)
- Brian Scott Miller, Edward L. Loper, Sr., Artist and Educator: An Oral History (Kent State University Master's Thesis, 1998)

== Filmography ==
- Edward Loper: Prophet of Color (dir. Sharon Baker, 35 minutes, 1999)
- Edward Loper: African American Painter (dir. Alonzo Crawford, 22 minutes, 2013)
