= Dinker-Irvin House =

Historic house in Delaware, United States

- U.S. National Register of Historic Places
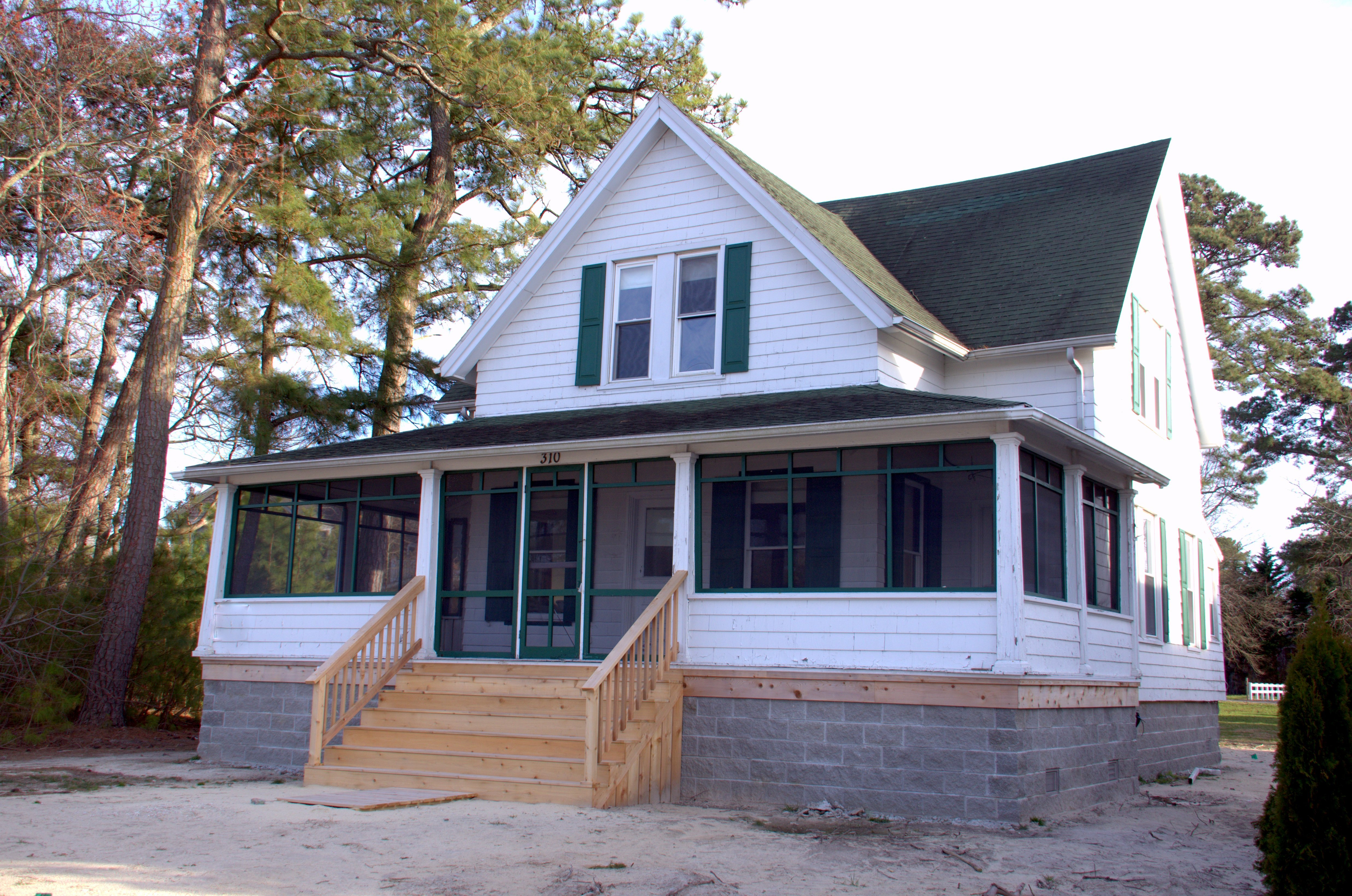

- Location within Delaware Location within the United States
- Location: 310 Garfield Pkwy. Extended, Bethany Beach, Delaware
- Coordinates: 38°32′17″N 75°3′37″W
- Built: 1904
- NRHP reference No.: 100001259
- Added to NRHP: July 3, 2017

The Dinker-Irvin House is a historic house museum at 310 Garfield Parkway Extended in Bethany Beach, Delaware. Built in 1904 by William A. Dinker, it is one of the oldest early 20th-century summer cottages in the community. Between 1922 and 1925 it served as the community post office, and is the only public-use building from that era to survive. It has twice been moved, once over a property dispute, and in 2007 due to road works. The house has been acquired by the city, with plans to convert it into a museum.

The house was added to the National Register of Historic Places in 2017. In 2022, the "Dinker-Irvin Cottage Museum" opened to the public focusing on the early 1900s.

== See also ==
- List of museums in Delaware
- National Register of Historic Places listings in Sussex County, Delaware
