= Burnfoot, County Londonderry =

Village in County Londonderry, Northern Ireland

Coordinates: 54.969535°N 6.939082°W

Burnfoot
- Location within Northern Ireland
- Population: 195 (2001 Census)
- District: Causeway Coast and Glens
- County: County Londonderry
- Country: Northern Ireland
- Sovereign state: United Kingdom
- Post town: LIMAVADY
- Postcode district: BT
- Dialling code: 028
- Police: Northern Ireland
- Fire: Northern Ireland
- Ambulance: Northern Ireland
- UK Parliament: East Londonderry
- NI Assembly: East Londonderry

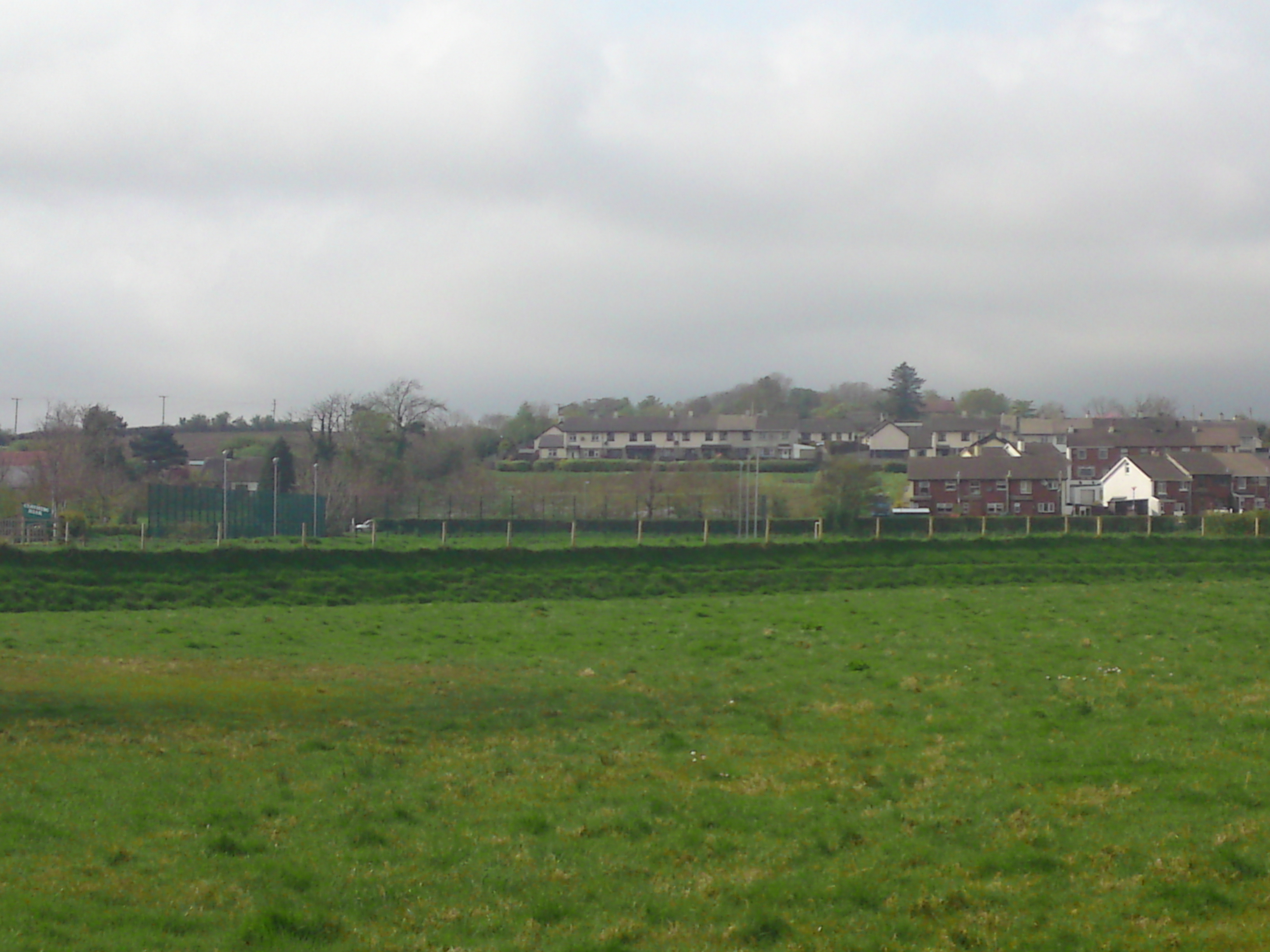
Burnfoot

Burnfoot is a small village within the townland of Bonnanaboigh in County Londonderry, Northern Ireland.

== Features ==
It is beside the River Roe, with the greater part of the built up area on the western side of Drumrane Road. The village has a good range of social, educational and recreational facilities, but commercial services are limited.

It has quite a large village shop, football fields and a primary school plus Orange Hall. Burnfoot has two churches, Bovevagh Church of Ireland (St. Eugenius) and Camnish Presbyterian Church. The Church of Ireland are currently developing a new parish centre for the development of the parish. Burnfoot has its own community hall and youth clubs such as the Girls Brigade. It has had a housing development called Rosebrook which added at least 15 houses to the area, making the population now about 250. In 2010 a man appeared in court charged with provocative behaviour after removing a loyalist flag from a lamppost in the area. The judge stated he should be commended for his actions.

== Ameneties ==
Burnfoot contains a fishing trail that Causeway Coast and Glens Borough Council stated they were looking to extend to Dungiven. Burnfoot contains Bovevagh Old Church, a former medieval church that was built upon an older monastery that was believed to have been founded by St Columba in 557. There was a wooden church until 1100 when it burned down and was rebuilt in stone. It was in use as a parish church until the 19th century and had its own erenaghs until the 17th century.

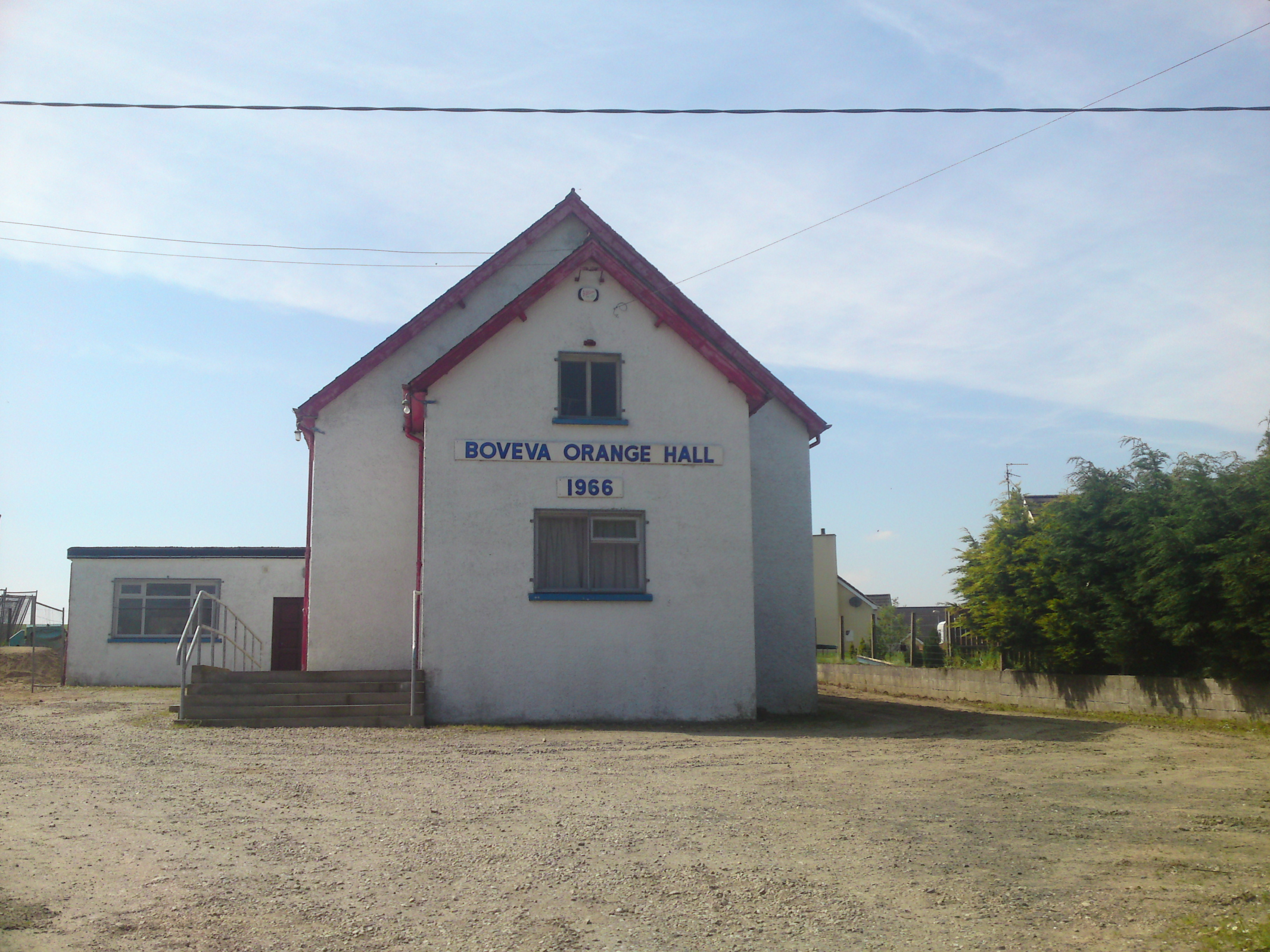
Boveva Orange Hall

== Transport ==
The village has good road links via Dungiven, but has limited public transport connections.

== Education ==
Drumrane Primary School ( An amalgamation of Dungiven PS Largy PS, and Burnfoot PS, which is situated beside the old Burnfoot Primary School in Burnfoot.

== Sport ==
Burnfoot United F.C. football club, founded in 1975, plays in the Coleraine and District Junior Premier League.

== See also ==
- List of villages in Northern Ireland
