= Herman Bailey =

American illustrator (1931–1981)

Herman "Kofi" Bailey
- Bailey's signature
- Born: Herman Bailey; November 28, 1931; Chicago, Illinois
- Died: April 27, 1981 (aged 49)
- Education: Alabama State College, University of Southern California
- Movement: Pan-Africanism
- Patrons: Maya Angelou, James Early, Samella Lewis

Herman "Kofi" Bailey (also known as Kofi X) (1931–1981) was an African-American artist. He was best known for his conté and charcoal drawings reflecting of the African-American experience.

== Personal life ==
Born in Chicago, Illinois, Bailey grew up in Los Angeles, California. He received his education from Alabama State College and then attended Howard University where he studied under Alain Locke, Sterling Brown and James A. Porter. He obtained his MFA at the University of Southern California. At Alabama he received commissions for large paintings and murals as a student. He was described as a "black bohemian" at the time, often seen wearing a beret, talking jive, carrying a bottle "in one pocket" and talking about music and art.

While living in Atlanta his studio space was located at the Institute of the Black World's second building. He lived at Paschal's Motor Lodge Hotel, where if he was unable to make rent he would trade artwork with one of the Paschal brothers in exchange. Bailey spoke with slurred speech, which was due to his heavy use of drugs and alcohol. Bailey was described as taking pills then drinking, spending his money on "a full pint of scotch" or vodka. Herman "Kofi" Bailey died in 1981 in Atlanta, Georgia.

== Professional career ==
Kofi Bailey's art revealed the historical antecedents of black freedom struggles and emphasized the people-centered force of the black political and cultural movements of that period.

— James Early, 1998

His work and illustrations have been described as "... Combining both geometric and figural elements, he often used massive shapes to surround the sensitively rendered figures that serve as focal points for most of his compositions." Geometric forms are often make up the background, as if to appear emerging from it. Bailey usually used charcoal or conté as a medium, experimenting with oil and acrylic painting as well. Sometimes he used three to four mediums in an artwork and color often took a secondary role in his work, preferring to rely on earth tones.

Bailey was influenced by artists such as Goya, Rico Lebrun, Jacob Lawrence and Charles White. He described himself in 1967 as a "representational" artist "rather than "abstract" because his work is committed to the masses who, he feels, "want to see art that deals with man, art which tries to express the varying moods of man; and man is my principal concern.""

In 1967 Bailey was artist-in-residence at Spelman College which held an exhibition about Bailey's work that was created while he was living in Ghana in 1962–1966.

=== Political and racial themes ===
Poster created by Bailey for Martin Luther King Jr.'s Poor People's Campaign, 1968

His artwork often reflected influences of Pan-Africanism. Portraits of Kwame Nkrumah often appeared, with Nkrumah, then President of Ghana, depicted as a heroic figure in front of a black star. While living in Ghana he served as an art teacher and the artist-in-residence to Nkrumah until the leader was deposed in 1966. Bailey also covered other areas of the African-American experience such as Black Power, anticolonialism, and African-American civil rights.

Black women and children often made frequent appearances as well. These socially aware and often politically charged artworks reflected the racism experienced by Africans and African Americans primarily in the 20th century. The stark contrast of the black inks or charcoals on white paper at times dramatizes the conflicts of blacks and whites. His work is commonly found in art and literature about the Civil Rights Movement .

While living in Atlanta he created posters for the H. Rap Brown Center, a venue that was frequented by members of the Student Nonviolent Coordinating Committee (SNCC). Eventually he would create posters for and serve as newsletter illustrator for the SNCC. After the Six-Day War, which Israel won, SNCC launched an anti-Zionist campaign featuring anti-Semitic images. Bailey created an illustration featuring an Israeli firing squad shooting a group of Arabs with a caption reading: "This is the Gaza Strip, Palestine, not Dachau, Germany". While some SNCC officers distanced themselves from the article and image, SNCC's pro-Palestinian stand cut support from many Jewish organizations.

Bailey continued to create at times controversial comics for SNCC including depictions of Moshe Dayan, generally believed to be stereotyping of Jewish financial dominance and by others as showing the financial dependencies between the US and Israeli military's. The Palestine Problem, another comic by Bailey during this time, connects United States racial violence, military imperialism in Vietnam and the Arab world, and the Afro-Arab freedom struggle. According to the Los Angeles Times, his graphic of a white hand holding a Star of David with a dollar sign, which was tightening the nooses around the necks of an African-American and an Arab man, was used in an infographic by Harvard Palestinian solidarity activists in February 2024.

=== Reception ===
James Early cites Kofi's work as a major influence, describing the illustrations by Bailey as "among the great, energizing artistic expressions created in the crucible of social justice activism and organizing that was Atlanta in the 1960s." Artist and art historian Floyd Coleman described Bailey as a rule breaker: "Although he didn't follow the rules he was committed to the struggle of African Americans and set a standard in his work that many of us tried to emulate." Carmen Riddle described Bailey as "a genius, a pure genius at his art."

== Notable collections ==
- California African American Museum
- Hampton University
- National Museum of African American History and Culture
- National Civil Rights Museum
- Spelman College
- University Museums at the University of Delaware

== Notable exhibitions ==
- Black Power/Black Art: and the struggle continues: Political Imagery from the Black Arts Movement of the 1960s and 1970s, 1994, San Francisco State University, San Francisco
- African American Art in Atlanta: Public and Corporate Collections, 1984, High Museum of Art, Atlanta
- TCB, 1971, National Center of Afro-American Artists, Boston
