= Delaware Governor's Mansion =

Historic house in Delaware, United States

- Governor's House
- U.S. National Register of Historic Places
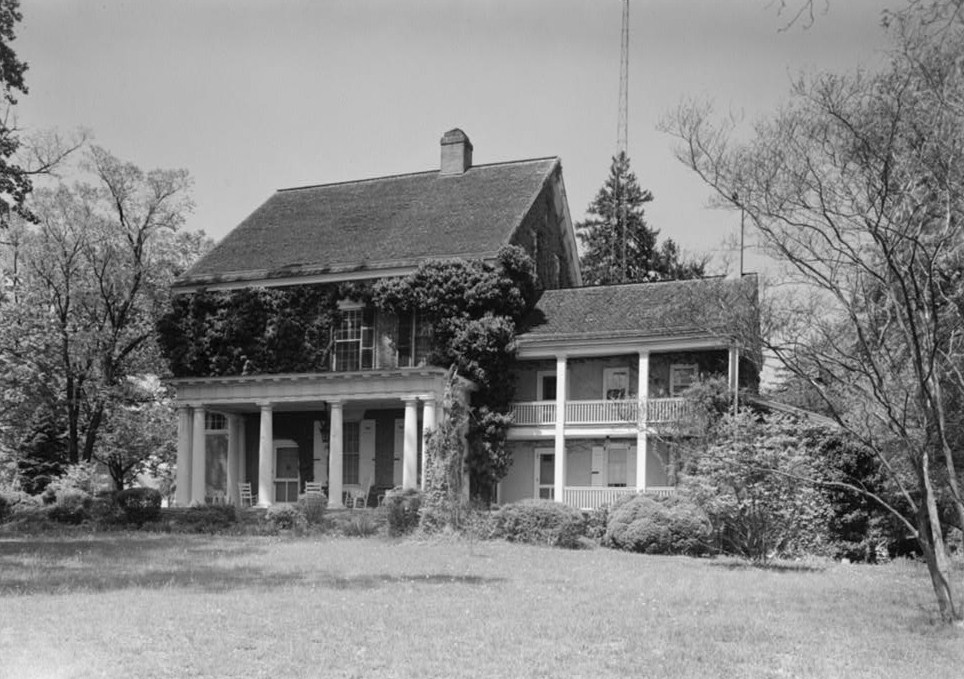

- Location within Delaware Location within the United States
- Location: Kings Hwy., Dover, Delaware
- Coordinates: 39°9′41″N 75°31′25″W
- Area: 0.1 acres (0.040 ha)
- Built: 1790
- Architect: Hillyard, Charles
- Architectural style: Middle Georgian
- NRHP reference No.: 72000279
- Added to NRHP: December 5, 1972

The Delaware Governor's Mansion, also known as Woodburn or Governor's House, is the official residence of the governor of Delaware and the governor's family. It is located in Dover, and was listed on the National Register of Historic Places as "Governor's House" in 1972.

== History ==
The land Woodburn stands upon was granted to David Morgan and his heirs in 1684 by the Swedish crown. In the 1780s, Charles Hillyard III purchased the land at a sheriff's sale for $110. In 1790, he constructed the home that would be called Woodburn.

The house was inherited by Mary, Hillyard's daughter, and her husband, Martin W. Bates. Bates was a doctor, merchant, lawyer, and a U.S. Senator. In 1820 Bates leased Woodburn to the Governor, Jacob Stout, the first time Woodburn was used as the executive's residence.

Bates sold the house in 1825 to Daniel and Mary Cowgill. Cowgill, devoted abolitionist and a Quaker, freed his family's slaves and allowed them to meet in the great hall at Woodburn. The house remained in the family for years until it was sold in 1912 to Daniel O. Hastings. In his ownership the brick front porch, pillars on the south facade, a reflecting pool and numerous interior modifications were completed. He sold the house in 1918 to retired Philadelphia dentist Frank Hall, who also completed more renovations of the interior. In Hall's residency, a young guest named Jessica Irby visited the house; she would later live in the house as the wife of a governor of Delaware.

Upon the Hall's death in 1953, there was a proposal to secure the house as the governor's mansion but it was disapproved by the legislature. The property was divided in two, with a school purchasing the majority of the land and Thomas Murray purchasing the house and a surrounding acre and a half.

The proposal of a residence for the governor was revived in 1965 when Governor Charles L. Terry, Jr. and his wife, Jessica Irby-Terry, secured Woodburn for the state. The house was refurbished by Mrs. Terry with period pieces dating from the house's construction. The decoration was completed a year later, and an open house was held in February 1966. Woodburn has served as the official residence ever since.

== Appearance ==
=== Exterior ===
The two-story brick home is in the Flemish bond pattern and has endured more than 200 years. The main section of the house has three bays with the main entrance on the far right. The large Dutch door and original wrought-iron strap hinges and iron lock box allow the door to swing open with little effort. The door is surmounted by a large fanlight inside a projecting pediment. The double sash, 9 panel windows are framed by sandstone blocks above and below and wooden dog-head shutters. A brick chimney projects through the sloped roof. The wing has slightly smaller windows with a basement entryway.

== Significance ==
The Governor's House holds architectural significance as an exemplary surviving specimen of high-quality 18th century residences in Delaware. It has been diligently preserved as an essential component of the State museum system, which aims to showcase representative Delaware houses from different eras and socioeconomic strata.

Charles Hillyard (1759–1814), the builder of this historic structure, belonged to the fourth generation of a prosperous landowning family that actively participated in the government, social, and economic affairs of Kent County, Delaware. The lineage's progenitor, Charles Hillyard, obtained a warrant in 1683 for a substantial landholding spanning 3,000 acres. The sole surviving proof of the Proprietor's visit to the town is a document signed in Dover.

Supported by local tradition, geographical circumstances, and the owner's known abolitionist views, this house is believed to have served as a stop on the renowned "Underground Railroad." In George Alfred Townsend's novel, The Entailed Hat (published in 1884), it is depicted as the site of an attempted abduction by Patty Cannon's gang. This widely-known novel has fostered a tradition asserting that Mrs. Cannon discharged a gunshot through the north door.

Furthermore, since 1965, the Governor's House has acquired additional significance as the official residence of Delaware's governors.

Over the years, this house has been home to notable Delaware families. Charles Hillyard, the original builder, was the son-in-law of William Killen, Delaware's first Chancellor.

Additionally, this historic dwelling once served as the residence of Mrs. Vera Davis, Delaware's pioneering female legislator.
