= University Museums at the University of Delaware =

Collection of museums in Newark, Delaware, United States

University Museums
- Location in Delaware University Museums at the University of Delaware (the United States)
- Location: University of Delaware, Newark, Delaware, USA
- Coordinates: 39.679111°N 75.752167°W
- Type: Art, African American art, Natural history
- Website: www.udel.edu/museums

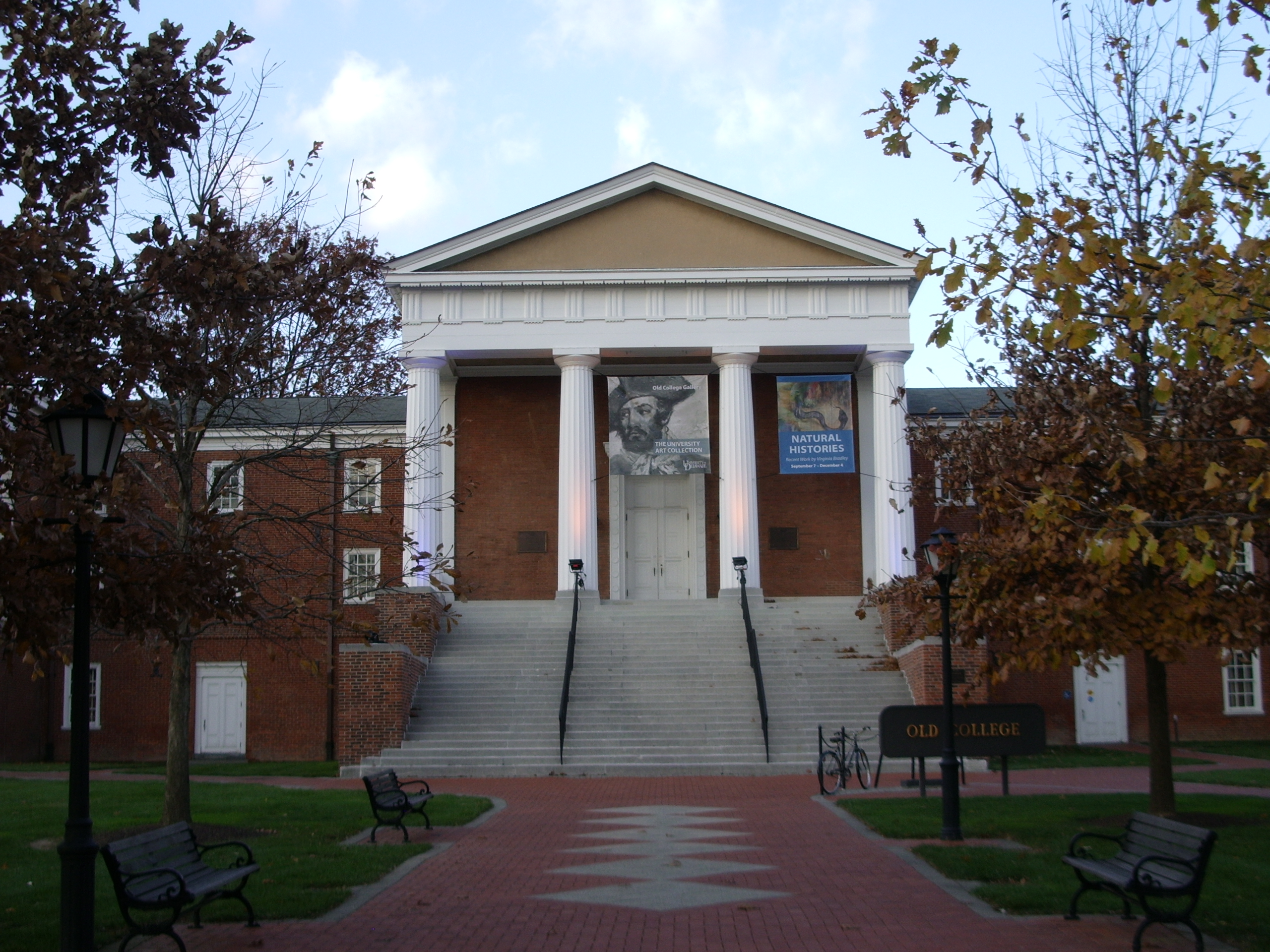
The Old College Gallery, University Museums, Newark, DE

The University Museums at the University of Delaware is the collective name for the University of Delaware's collections of American art, minerals, and Pre-Columbian ceramics.

The museums are open to the public and are used as laboratories by University of Delaware students enrolled in the Curatorial Apprenticeship Program. The collections are used in teaching a variety of subjects ranging from geology, to African American studies and art history.

== University Gallery ==
The University Gallery, housed in the "Old College" building on the north campus, contains more than 10,000 works. One feature of the collection is its extensive holdings of vintage and contemporary photographs, including comprehensive surveys of the works of Gertrude Käsebier and Clarence Hudson White. Other notable collections include Pre-Columbian and Native American ceramics from the Moche and Pueblo cultures; and a number American prints and drawings from the 19th century to the present.

In 2007 the University Gallery took charge of the University of Delaware collection with notable works by Howard Pyle, Stanley Arthurs, Frank Schoonover and N. C. Wyeth of the Brandywine School.

== Mechanical Hall ==
The Mechanical Hall was renovated in 2004 to house the Paul R. Jones Collection of African American Art, donated by Atlanta, Georgia art collector Paul R. Jones. Jones' gift of several hundred important works from his personal collection was the outgrowth of a relationship that University of Delaware professor William Homer established in the early 1990s. The University Gallery mounted an exhibition of artwork from his collection in 1993. After negotiations regarding the conservation of the work and its pedagogical use, including outreach to historically black colleges and universities, Jones effected the gift in 2001.

The Jones collection is considered the most comprehensive collection of 18th, 19th and 20th century African American art and includes important works by Kofi Bailey, Romare Bearden, Selma Burke, Elizabeth Catlett, Robert Colescott, David Driskell, David Hammons, Lonnie Holley, Wifredo Lam, Jacob Lawrence, Hughie Lee-Smith, Edward L. Loper, Sr., Eugene J. Martin and P. H. Polk.

== Mineralogical Museum ==
The Mineralogical Museum was created in 1964 with the gift of Irénée du Pont's personal collection of mineral specimens, which he had acquired from George Frederick Kunz in 1919.

The collection, which now resides in Penny Hall, includes numerous examples of minerals from exhausted mines, including a tourmaline from the Himalaya Mine in San Diego, California and copper ore from the Quincy Mine on Keweenaw Peninsula in Michigan.
