= Delaware Aviation Museum =

- Location within Delaware
- Established: 2004
- Location: Georgetown, Delaware
- Coordinates: 38.6890°N 75.3656°W
- Type: Aviation museum
- Founders: Sean Carroll; Larry Kelley; John Kenny
- Website: www.delawareaviationmuseum.org

The Delaware Aviation Museum is an aviation museum located at Delaware Coastal Airport in Georgetown, Delaware.

== History ==
=== Background ===
In 1957, Larry Kelley began helping his uncle restore a UC-78. Years later he purchased the same aircraft.

=== Establishment ===
The Delaware Aviation Museum Foundation was co-founded by Sean Carroll, Larry Kelley and John Kenny in 2004. After receiving a lease for a 10,000 sq ft (930 m^{2}) hangar, Carroll moved his restoration company, Kimble's Aviation Services, to the airport. The museum was set up in an adjacent control tower and terminal building.

== Facilities ==
The Jeffrey L. Ethell Aviation Library at the museum holds a collection of 3,000 books that belonged to the author.

== Collection ==
=== Aircraft ===
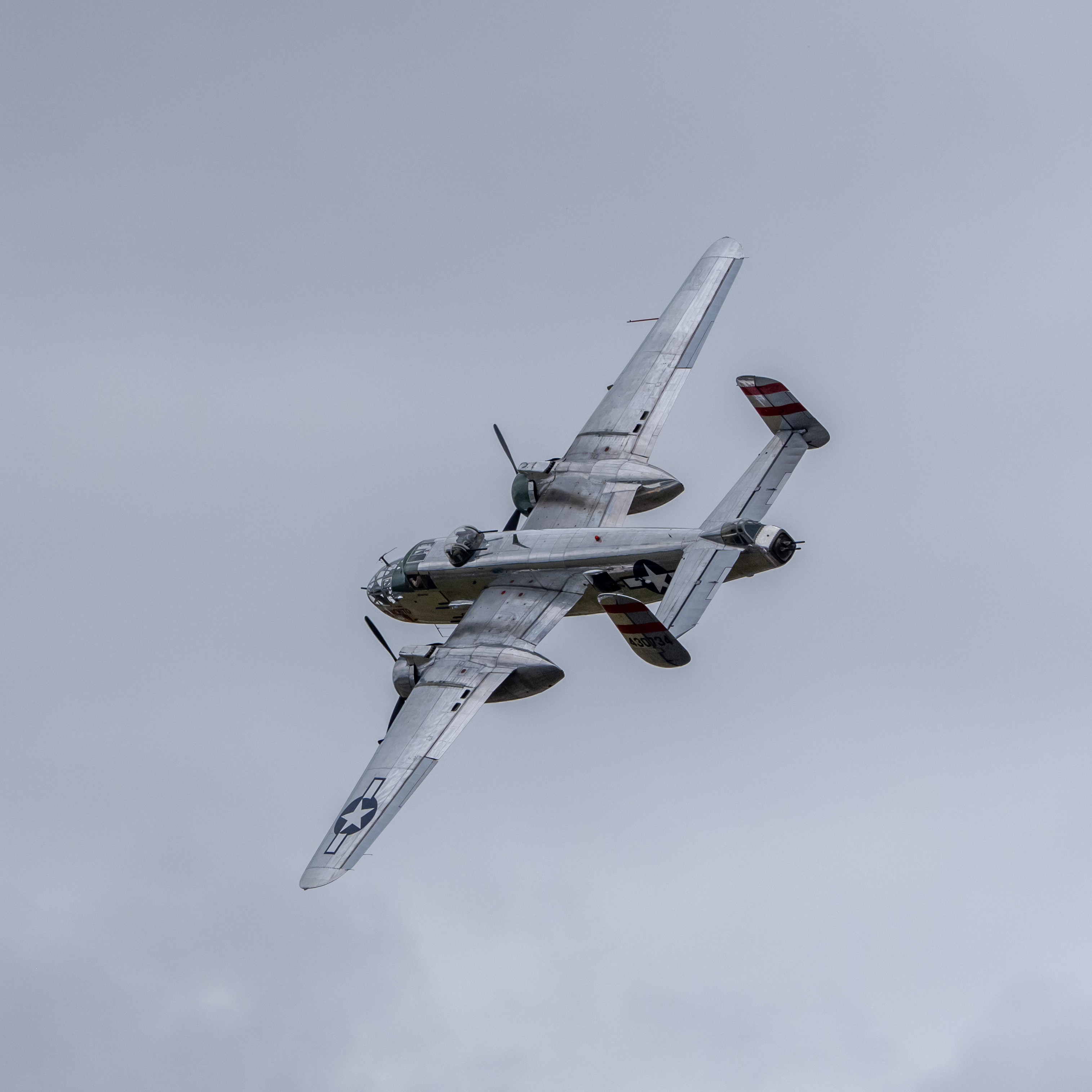
The museum's B-25 at the Wings Over North Georgia Air Show in 2020

- Aeronca L-16
- Cessna O-1 Bird Dog
- Cessna UC-78 Bobcat
- de Havilland DH.82A Tiger Moth
- de Havilland DH.82C Tiger Moth
- de Havilland Canada DHC-1 Chipmunk
- de Havilland Canada DHC-1 Chipmunk
- de Havilland Canada DH.82C Tiger Moth
- ERCO Ercoupe
- North American B-25J Mitchell
- Piper J3C Cub
- Piper J4F Cub Coupe
- North American L-17A Navion

=== Ground vehicles ===
- BSA M20
- Jeep

== Events ==
The museum holds an annual Wings & Wheels Fall Festival.

== Programs ==
The foundation offers rides in three of its aircraft. It also offers flight training in three of its aircraft.
