= Politics of Delaware =

Politics of a U.S. state

Gubernatorial election results
Year	Democratic	Republican
1952	47.9% 81,772	52.1% 88,977
1956	48.1% 85,047	52.0% 91,965
1960	51.7% 100,792	48.3% 94,043
1964	51.4% 102,797	48.7% 97,374
1968	49.5% 102,360	50.5% 104,474
1972	51.3% 117,274	47.9% 109,583
1976	42.5% 97,480	56.9% 130,531
1980	28.5% 64,217	70.7% 159,004
1984	44.5% 108,315	55.5% 135,250
1988	29.3% 70,236	70.7% 169,733
1992	64.7% 179,365	32.8% 90,725
1996	69.5% 188,300	30.5% 82,564
2000	59.2% 191,695	39.8% 128,603
2004	50.9% 185,548	45.8% 167,008
2008	67.5% 266,861	32.0% 126,662
2012	69.3% 275,993	28.6% 113,793
2016	58.3% 248,404	39.2% 166,852
2020	59.5% 292,903	38.6% 190,312
2024	56.1% 279,585	43.9% 209,050

Due to the state's small size (45th of 50 by population in 2022), the politics of Delaware tend to be less convoluted and controversial than those in neighboring states. Nonetheless, Delaware's political status quo reflects the state's long history of political clout dating from the earliest days of the United States, some of which remains today. Historically, the state was considered a swing state, as it voted for the national winner all but twice between 1896 and 1996; the only exceptions being 1916 and 1948. However, in the 21st century, the state has become strongly Democratic and provided double-digit wins to Democrats since 2008. The 2008 election saw Democrat Barack Obama with a 25.0% margin of victory, the best-ever result for a Democratic presidential candidate in the state's history. Obama's large margin of victory was aided by his running mate, Joe Biden, a longtime U.S. senator from the state and the first Delawarean to appear on a national presidential ticket. Biden later went on to become the first Delawarean elected president in 2020.

== Major issues ==
A heavily Democratic state, progressivism and social liberalism are generally concentrated in the northern part of the state, and conservatism is more prevalent in the less heavily populated central and southern regions. Some of the wealthiest neighborhoods around Wilmington (in the north) as well as a few of the more progressive beach towns (in the south) serve as exceptions to this general trend. Politicians of both major parties tend to vote consistently in favor of big business, an important sector of Delaware's economy. Despite this, economically progressive measures such as Medicare for All and the state's $15 an hour minimum wage remain popular.

Matters of perennial statewide debate tend to include taxation (which runs relatively low compared to other northeastern states); the needs and demands of Delaware's massive business community; education (Delaware's educational spending per student remains low); increasing stress on the environment; urban development and sprawl; the needs of an increasingly diverse population; large income disparities between wealthy and disadvantaged areas; and a perceived disconnect between the rural central and southern areas of the state and Wilmington and the urbanized corridor in the north, home to the bulk of the state's population.

== National politics ==
Delaware's situation with respect to the Presidential Primary Election changed between 2000 and 2008. Delaware's Primary is held "on the first Tuesday in February in the calendar year of a presidential election." In 2000, Delaware was the sole state to have a primary on February 1, while in 2004 it was one of five states with primaries on February 3. In the 2008 primaries, Delaware shared February 5 with 23 other states on "Super Tuesday (2008)", the largest group of simultaneous primary races in the history of the United States. Being the first Primary in the nation increases the influence of a state disproportionately in determining who the contestants will be in the general presidential election. However, as other states change the dates of their primaries, influence is inevitably decreased.

== Federal representation ==
Delaware's senators in the United States Senate are Chris Coons and Lisa Blunt Rochester, both Democrats, serving since 2010 and 2025, respectively. Delaware's at-large representative in the United States House of Representatives is Sarah McBride, a Democrat.

Delaware is part of the United States District Court for the District of Delaware in the federal judiciary. The district's cases are appealed to the Philadelphia-based United States Court of Appeals for the Third Circuit.

== Party registration ==
Party registration as of January 1, 2024 (Note: Parties that make up less than 5% of total registered voters are not shown.)
Party	Total voters	Percentage
Democratic	353,229	45.93%
Republican	206,596	26.87%
No party	171,251	22.27%
Delaware Independent	10,575	1.38%
Other	27,327	3.55%
Total	768,978	100%

== Presidential elections ==
United States presidential election results for Delaware
Year	Republican / Whig		Democratic		Third party(ies)	
Year	No.	%	No.	%	No.	%
1832	4,276	50.99%	4,110	49.01%	0	0.00%
1836	4,736	53.24%	4,154	46.70%	5	0.06%
1840	5,967	54.99%	4,872	44.89%	13	0.12%
1844	6,271	51.20%	5,970	48.75%	6	0.05%
1848	6,440	51.80%	5,910	47.54%	82	0.66%
1852	6,293	49.66%	6,318	49.85%	62	0.49%
1856	310	2.12%	8,004	54.83%	6,284	43.05%
1860	3,822	23.72%	1,066	6.61%	11,227	69.67%
1864	8,155	48.19%	8,767	51.81%	0	0.00%
1868	7,614	41.00%	10,957	59.00%	0	0.00%
1872	11,129	51.00%	10,205	46.76%	488	2.24%
1876	10,752	44.55%	13,381	55.45%	0	0.00%
1880	14,148	48.03%	15,181	51.53%	129	0.44%
1884	12,953	43.20%	16,957	56.55%	74	0.25%
1888	12,950	43.51%	16,414	55.15%	400	1.34%
1892	18,077	48.55%	18,581	49.90%	577	1.55%
1896	20,450	53.18%	16,574	43.10%	1,432	3.72%
1900	22,535	53.67%	18,852	44.90%	602	1.43%
1904	23,705	54.05%	19,347	44.11%	804	1.83%
1908	25,014	52.10%	22,055	45.94%	938	1.95%
1912	15,998	32.85%	22,631	46.48%	10,065	20.67%
1916	26,011	50.20%	24,753	47.78%	1,046	2.02%
1920	52,858	55.71%	39,911	42.07%	2,106	2.22%
1924	52,441	57.70%	33,445	36.80%	4,999	5.50%
1928	68,860	65.03%	36,643	34.60%	388	0.37%
1932	57,073	50.55%	54,319	48.11%	1,509	1.34%
1936	57,236	44.85%	69,702	54.62%	665	0.52%
1940	61,440	45.05%	74,599	54.70%	335	0.25%
1944	56,747	45.27%	68,166	54.38%	448	0.36%
1948	69,588	50.04%	67,813	48.76%	1,672	1.20%
1952	90,059	51.75%	83,315	47.88%	651	0.37%
1956	98,057	55.09%	79,421	44.62%	510	0.29%
1960	96,373	49.00%	99,590	50.63%	720	0.37%
1964	78,078	38.78%	122,704	60.95%	538	0.27%
1968	96,714	45.12%	89,194	41.61%	28,459	13.28%
1972	140,357	59.60%	92,283	39.18%	2,876	1.22%
1976	109,831	46.57%	122,596	51.98%	3,407	1.44%
1980	111,252	47.21%	105,754	44.87%	18,662	7.92%
1984	152,190	59.78%	101,656	39.93%	726	0.29%
1988	139,639	55.88%	108,647	43.48%	1,605	0.64%
1992	102,313	35.31%	126,054	43.51%	61,368	21.18%
1996	99,062	36.54%	140,355	51.78%	31,667	11.68%
2000	137,288	41.90%	180,068	54.96%	10,266	3.13%
2004	171,660	45.74%	200,152	53.34%	3,458	0.92%
2008	152,374	36.93%	255,459	61.91%	4,783	1.16%
2012	165,484	39.98%	242,584	58.61%	5,853	1.41%
2016	185,127	41.71%	235,603	53.09%	23,084	5.20%
2020	200,603	39.77%	296,268	58.74%	7,475	1.48%
2024	214,351	41.79%	289,758	56.49%	8,803	1.72%

== See also ==
- Political party strength in Delaware
