= United States presidential elections in Delaware =

Presidential elections in Delaware
- Number of elections: 60
- Voted Democratic: 24
- Voted Republican: 20
- Voted Whig: 4
- Voted Democratic-Republican: 4
- Voted Federalist: 6
- Voted other: 2 (Note: George Washington, 1788-89, 1792.)
- Voted for winning candidate: 40
- Voted for losing candidate: 19

Following is a table of United States presidential elections in Delaware, ordered by year. Since its admission to statehood in 1787, Delaware has participated in every U.S. presidential election.

Winners of the state are in bold. The shading refers to the state winner, and not the national winner.

== Elections from 1864 to present ==
View source data.

Year	Winner (nationally)	Votes	Percent	Runner-up (nationally)	Votes	Percent	Other national candidates (Note: For purposes of these lists, other national candidates are defined as those who won at least one electoral vote, or won at least ten percent of the vote in multiple states.)	Votes	Percent	Electoral votes	Notes
2024	Donald Trump	214,351	41.79	**Kamala Harris**	289,758	56.49	—			3	
2020	**Joe Biden**	296,268	58.74	Donald Trump	200,603	39.77	—			3	
2016	Donald Trump (Note: Won the electoral college while losing the popular vote)	185,127	41.71	**Hillary Clinton**	235,603	53.09	–			3	
2012	**Barack Obama**	242,584	58.61	Mitt Romney	165,484	39.98	–			3	
2008	**Barack Obama**	255,459	61.94	John McCain	152,374	36.95	–			3	
2004	George W. Bush	171,660	45.75	**John Kerry**	200,152	53.35	–			3	
2000	George W. Bush	137,288	41.90	**Al Gore**	180,068	54.96	–			3	
1996	**Bill Clinton**	140,355	51.80	Bob Dole	99,062	36.58	Ross Perot	28,719	10.60	3	
1992	**Bill Clinton**	126,054	43.52	George H. W. Bush	102,313	35.78	Ross Perot	59,213	20.45	3	
1988	**George H. W. Bush**	139,639	55.88	Michael Dukakis	108,647	43.48	–			3	
1984	**Ronald Reagan**	152,190	59.78	Walter Mondale	101,656	39.93	–			3	
1980	**Ronald Reagan**	111,252	47.21	Jimmy Carter	105,754	44.87	John B. Anderson	16,288	6.91	3	
1976	**Jimmy Carter**	122,596	51.98	Gerald Ford	109,831	46.57	–			3	
1972	**Richard Nixon**	140,357	59.60	George McGovern	92,283	39.18	–			3	
1968	**Richard Nixon**	96,714	45.12	Hubert Humphrey	89,194	41.61	George Wallace	28,459	13.28	3	
1964	**Lyndon B. Johnson**	122,704	60.95	Barry Goldwater	78,078	38.78	–			3	
1960	**John F. Kennedy**	99,590	50.63	Richard Nixon	96,373	49.00	–			3	
1956	**Dwight D. Eisenhower**	98,057	55.09	Adlai Stevenson II	79,421	44.62	T. Coleman Andrews/ Unpledged Electors (Note: Was allied with a slate of unpledged electors in Louisiana, Mississippi and South Carolina)	–		3	
1952	**Dwight D. Eisenhower**	90,059	51.75	Adlai Stevenson II	83,315	47.88	–			3	
1948	Harry S. Truman	67,813	48.76	**Thomas E. Dewey**	69,588	50.04	Strom Thurmond	–		3	
1944	**Franklin D. Roosevelt**	68,166	54.38	Thomas E. Dewey	56,747	45.27	–			3	
1940	**Franklin D. Roosevelt**	74,599	54.70	Wendell Willkie	61,440	45.05	–			3	
1936	**Franklin D. Roosevelt**	69,702	54.62	Alf Landon	57,236	44.85	–			3	
1932	Franklin D. Roosevelt	54,319	48.11	**Herbert Hoover**	57,073	50.55	–			3	
1928	**Herbert Hoover**	68,860	65.03	Al Smith	36,643	34.60	–			3	
1924	**Calvin Coolidge**	52,441	57.70	John W. Davis	33,445	36.80	Robert M. La Follette	4,979	5.48	3	
1920	**Warren G. Harding**	52,858	55.71	James M. Cox	39,911	42.07	Parley P. Christensen	93	0.10	3	
1916	Woodrow Wilson	24,753	47.78	**Charles E. Hughes**	26,011	50.20	–			3	
1912	**Woodrow Wilson**	22,631	46.48	Theodore Roosevelt	8,886	18.25	William H. Taft	15,998	32.85	3	
1908	**William H. Taft**	25,014	52.10	William Jennings Bryan	22,055	45.94	–			3	
1904	**Theodore Roosevelt**	23,705	54.05	Alton B. Parker	19,347	44.11	–			3	
1900	**William McKinley**	22,535	53.67	William Jennings Bryan	18,852	44.90	–			3	
1896	**William McKinley**	20,450	53.18	William Jennings Bryan	16,574	43.10	–			3	
1892	**Grover Cleveland**	18,581	49.90	Benjamin Harrison	18,077	48.55	James B. Weaver	–	–	3	
1888	Benjamin Harrison	12,950	43.51	**Grover Cleveland**	16,414	55.15	–			3	
1884	**Grover Cleveland**	16,957	56.55	James G. Blaine	12,953	43.20	–			3	
1880	James A. Garfield	14,148	48.03	**Winfield S. Hancock**	15,181	51.53	James B. Weaver	129	0.44	3	
1876	Rutherford B. Hayes	10,752	44.55	**Samuel J. Tilden**	13,381	55.45	–			3	
1872	**Ulysses S. Grant**	11,129	51.00	Horace Greeley	10,205	46.76	–			3	
1868	Ulysses S. Grant	7,614	41.0	**Horatio Seymour**	10,957	59.0	–			3	
1864	Abraham Lincoln	8,155	48.2	**George B. McClellan**	8,767	51.8	–			3	

== Election of 1860 ==
The election of 1860 was a complex realigning election in which the breakdown of the previous two-party alignment culminated in four parties each competing for influence in different parts of the country. The result of the election, with the victory of an ardent opponent of slavery, spurred the secession of eleven states and brought about the American Civil War.

Year	Winner (nationally)	Votes	Percent	Runner-up (nationally)	Votes	Percent	Runner-up (nationally)	Votes	Percent	Runner-up (nationally)	Votes	Percent	Electoral votes
1860	Abraham Lincoln	3,822	23.7	Stephen A. Douglas	1,066	6.6	**John C. Breckinridge**	7,339	45.5	John Bell	3,888	24.1	3

== Elections from 1828 to 1856 ==
Year	Winner (nationally)	Votes	Percent	Runner-up (nationally)	Votes	Percent	Other national candidates	Votes	Percent	Electoral votes	Notes
1856	**James Buchanan**	8,004	54.83	John C. Frémont	310	2.12	Millard Fillmore	6,275	42.99	3	
1852	**Franklin Pierce**	6,318	49.85	Winfield Scott	6,293	49.66	John P. Hale	62	0.49	3	
1848	**Zachary Taylor**	6,440	51.80	Lewis Cass	5,910	47.54	Martin Van Buren	82	0.66	3	
1844	James K. Polk	5,970	48.75	**Henry Clay**	6,271	51.20	-			3	
1840	**William Henry Harrison**	5,967	54.99	Martin Van Buren	4,872	44.89	-			3	
1836	Martin Van Buren	4,154	46.70	**William Henry Harrison**	4,736	53.24	various (Note: Three other candidates ran and received electoral votes nationally as part of the unsuccessful Whig strategy to defeat Martin Van Buren by running four candidates with local appeal in different regions of the country. The others were Hugh Lawson White, Daniel Webster, and Willie Person Mangum. None of these candidates appeared on the ballot in Delaware.)	no ballots		3	
1832	Andrew Jackson	4,110	49.01	**Henry Clay**	4,276	50.99	William Wirt	no ballots		3	
1828	Andrew Jackson	no popular vote		**John Quincy Adams**	no popular vote		-			3	

== Election of 1824 ==
The election of 1824 was a complex realigning election following the collapse of the prevailing Democratic-Republican Party, resulting in four different candidates each claiming to carry the banner of the party, and competing for influence in different parts of the country. The election was the only one in history to be decided by the House of Representatives under the provisions of the Twelfth Amendment to the United States Constitution after no candidate secured a majority of the electoral vote. It was also the only presidential election in which the candidate who received a plurality of electoral votes (Andrew Jackson) did not become president, a source of great bitterness for Jackson and his supporters, who proclaimed the election of Adams a corrupt bargain.

Year	Winner (nationally)	Votes	Percent	Runner-up (nationally)	Votes	Percent	Runner-up (nationally)	Votes	Percent	Runner-up (nationally)	Votes	Percent	Electoral votes	Notes
1824	Andrew Jackson	no popular vote	-	John Quincy Adams	no popular vote	-	Henry Clay	no popular vote	-	**William H. Crawford**	no popular vote	-	3	Electoral votes split 2 (Crawford) to 1 (Adams).

== Elections from 1788-1789 to 1820 ==
In the election of 1820, incumbent President James Monroe ran effectively unopposed, winning all 4 of Delaware's electoral votes, and all electoral votes nationwide except one vote in New Hampshire. To the extent that a popular vote was held, it was primarily directed to filling the office of vice president.

In elections from 1792 to 1816, Delaware did not conduct a popular vote. Each Elector was appointed by the state legislature.

Year	Winner (nationally)	Runner-up (nationally)	Electoral votes	Notes
1820	**James Monroe**	-	4	Monroe effectively ran unopposed.
1816	James Monroe	**Rufus King**	3	One elector failed to cast their vote.
1812	James Madison	**DeWitt Clinton**	4	
1808	James Madison	**Charles C. Pinckney**	3	
1804	Thomas Jefferson	**Charles C. Pinckney**	3	
1800	Thomas Jefferson	**John Adams**	3	
1796	**John Adams**	Thomas Jefferson	3	
1792	**George Washington**	-	3	Washington effectively ran unopposed.
1788-89	**George Washington**	-	3	Washington effectively ran unopposed.

== See also ==
- Elections in Delaware
