= 1808 United States presidential election in Delaware =

- November 4 – December 7, 1808
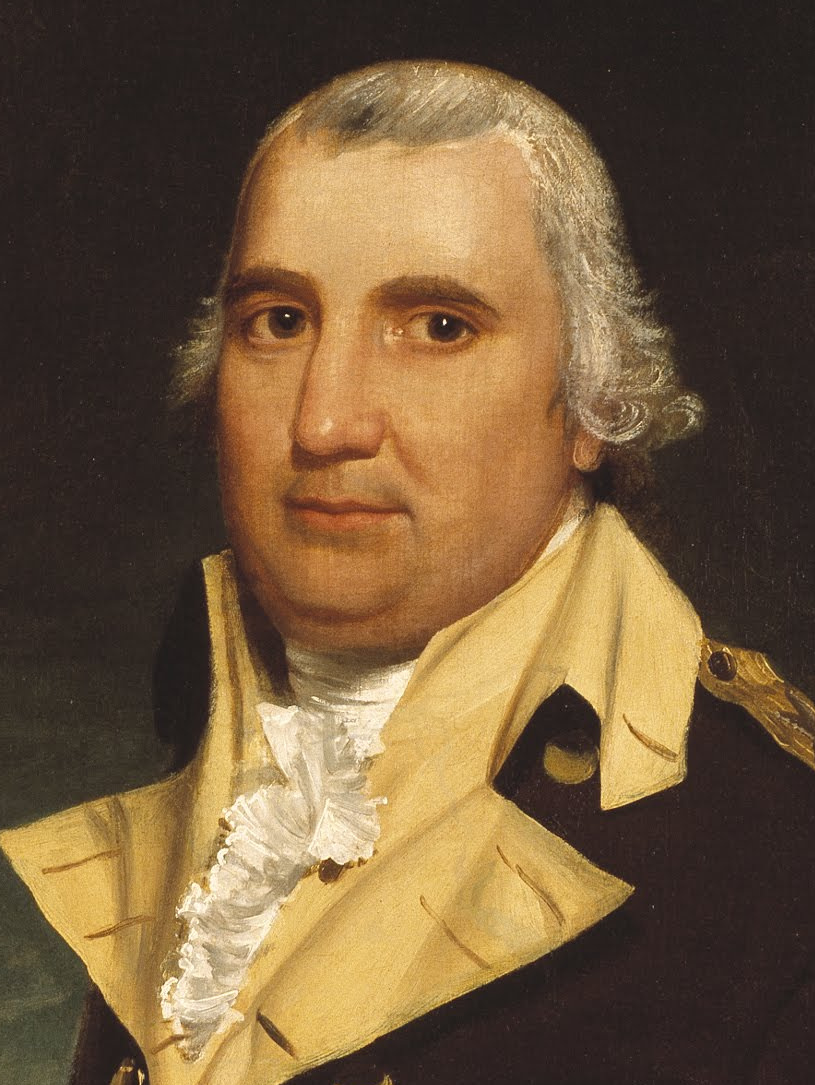

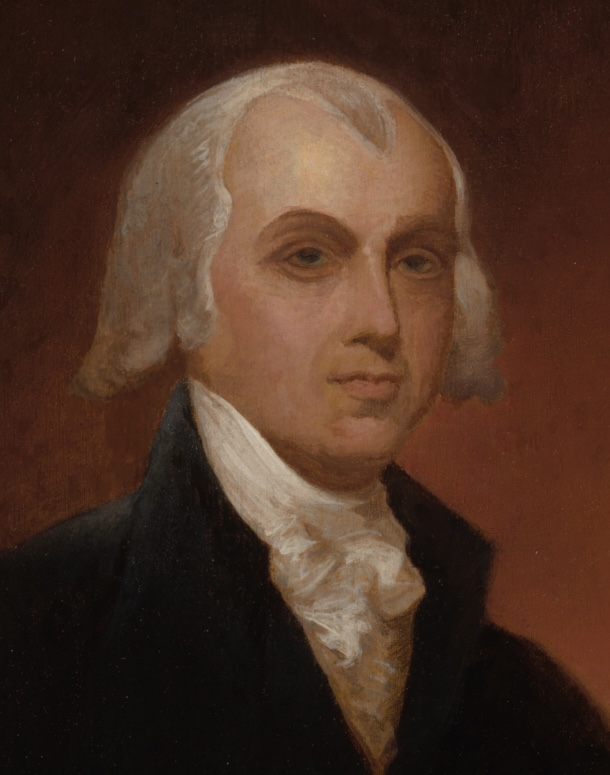
Nominee	Charles Cotesworth Pinckney	James Madison
Party	Federalist	Democratic-Republican
Home state	South Carolina	Virginia
Running mate	Rufus King	George Clinton
Electoral vote	3	0

The 1808 United States presidential election in Delaware took place between November 4 and December 7, 1808, as part of the 1808 United States presidential election. Voters chose three representatives, or electors to the Electoral College, who voted for President and Vice President.

Delaware cast three electoral votes for the Federalist candidate Charles Cotesworth Pinckney over the Democratic-Republican candidate James Madison. These electors were elected by the Delaware General Assembly, the state legislature, rather than by popular vote. The three electoral votes for Vice president were cast for Pinckney's running mate Rufus King from New York.

== Results ==
1808 United States presidential election in Delaware
Party	Candidate	Votes	Percentage	Electoral votes
Federalist	Charles Cotesworth Pinckney	–	–	3
Democratic-Republican	James Madison	–	–	0
Totals		–	–	3

== See also ==
- United States presidential elections in Delaware
