= 1804 United States presidential election in Delaware =

- November 12, 1804
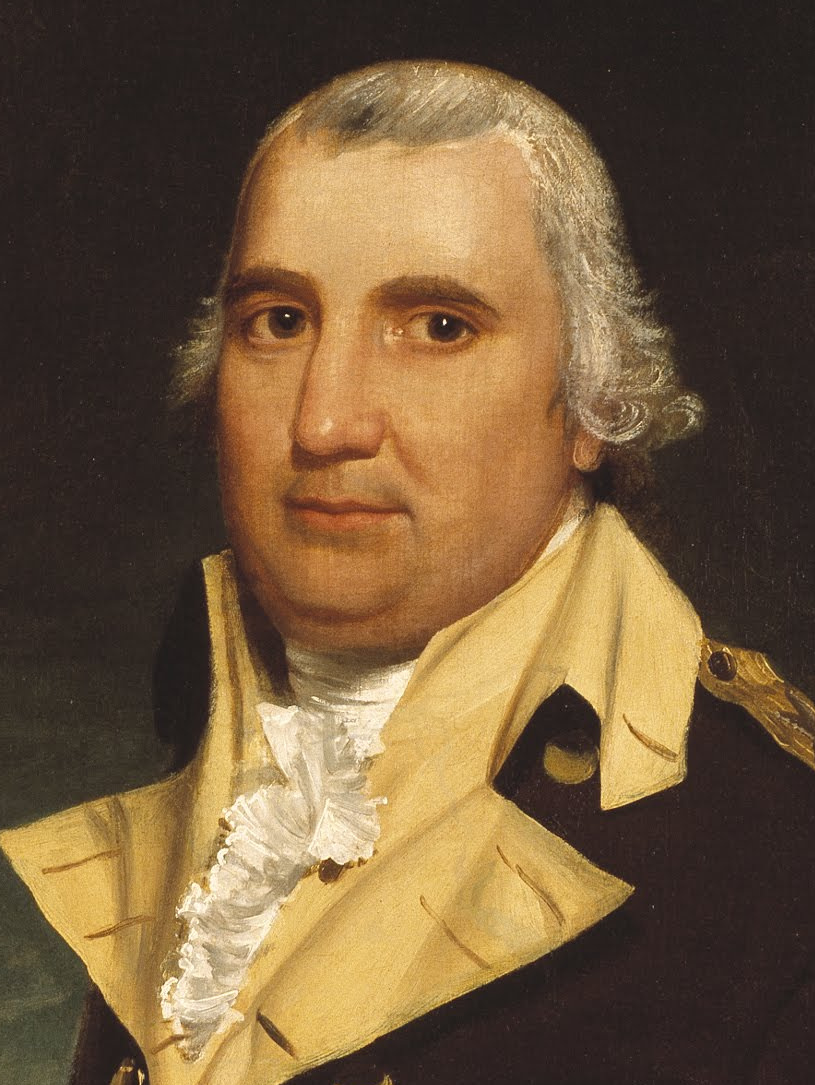

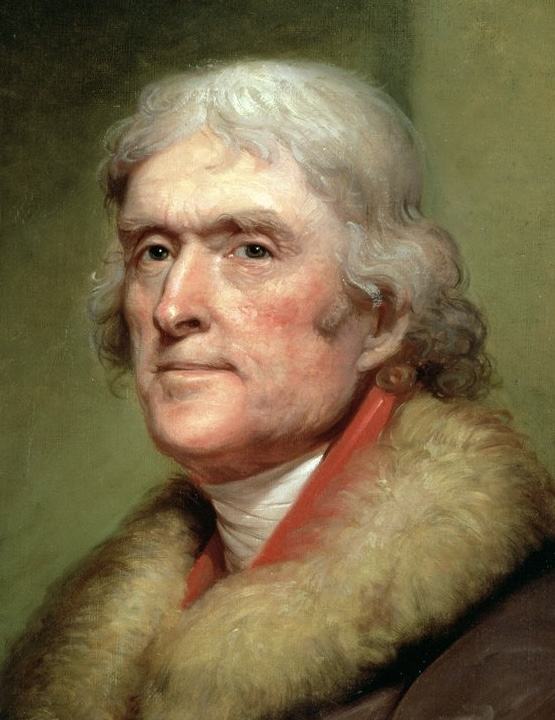
Nominee	Charles Cotesworth Pinckney	Thomas Jefferson
Party	Federalist	Democratic-Republican
Home state	South Carolina	Virginia
Running mate	Rufus King	George Clinton
Electoral vote	3	0
Legislative vote	18	5
Percentage	78.2%	21.7%
President before election
Thomas Jefferson
Democratic-Republican
Elected President
Thomas Jefferson
Democratic-Republican

A presidential election was held in Delaware on November 12, 1804, as part of the 1804 United States presidential election. The Federalist Party's ticket defeated the Democratic-Republican Party's ticket in the Delaware General Assembly. The Federalist electors voted for former U.S. minister to France Charles Cotesworth Pinckney and former U.S. minister to Great Britain Rufus King over the incumbent president Thomas Jefferson and the former New York governor George Clinton.

Jefferson won the national election in a landslide. Delaware was one of two states to back the losing Federalist candidates, in addition to Connecticut and two single-member districts in Maryland.

== General election ==
1804 United States presidential election in Delaware
Party	Candidate	Votes
Federalist	Maxwell Bines	18
Federalist	Thomas Fisher	18
Federalist	George Kennard	18
Democratic-Republican	John Fisher	5
Democratic-Republican	Joseph Haslet	5
Democratic-Republican	George Read Jr.	5
Total		23

== See also ==
- United States presidential elections in Delaware

== Bibliography ==
- Dauer, Manning Julian (2002). "Election of 1804". In Schlesinger, Arthur M. Jr.; Israel, Fred L. (eds.). History of American Presidential Elections, 1789–2001. Vol. 1. Philadelphia: Chelsea House Publishers. pp. 159–82.
- Lampi, Philip J. (2012). "Delaware 1804 Electoral College". A New Nation Votes. American Antiquarian Society.
