= 1824 United States presidential election in Delaware =

- October 26 – December 2, 1824
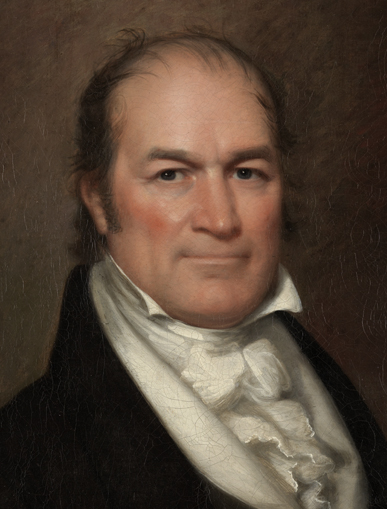

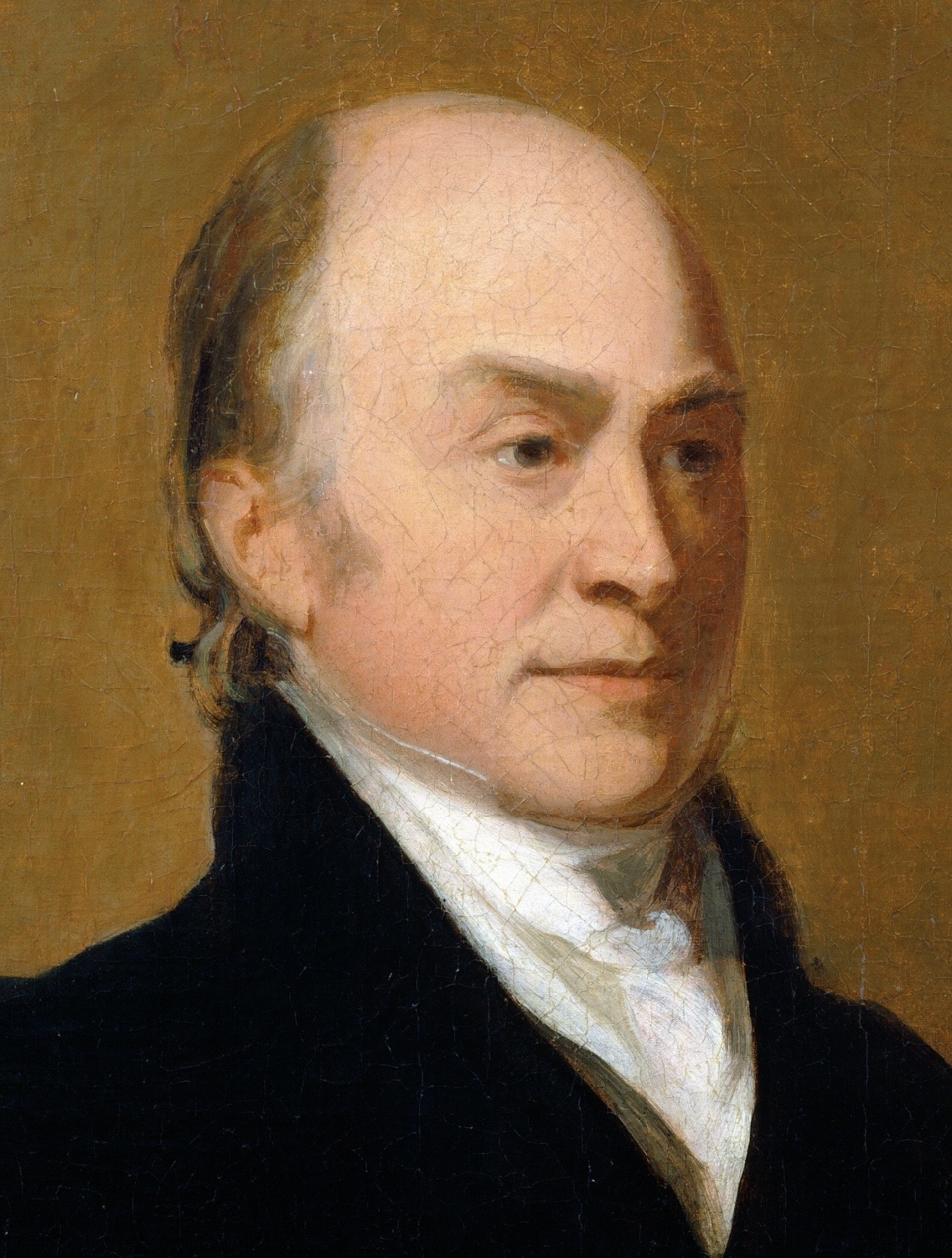
Nominee	William H. Crawford	John Quincy Adams
Party	Democratic-Republican	Democratic-Republican
Home state	Georgia	Massachusetts
Running mate	Nathaniel Macon	John C. Calhoun
Electoral vote	2	1
President before election
James Monroe
Democratic-Republican
Elected President
John Quincy Adams
Democratic-Republican

The 1824 United States presidential election in Delaware took place between October 26 and December 2, 1824, as part of the 1824 United States presidential election. Voters chose three representatives, or electors to the Electoral College, who voted for President and Vice President.

During this election, the Democratic-Republican Party was the only major national party, and four different candidates from this party sought the Presidency. Delaware cast two electoral votes for William H. Crawford and one for John Quincy Adams.

== Results ==
1824 United States presidential election in Delaware
Party	Candidate	Votes	Percentage	Electoral votes
Democratic-Republican	William H. Crawford			2
Democratic-Republican	John Quincy Adams			1
Democratic-Republican	Henry Clay			0
Democratic-Republican	Andrew Jackson			0
Totals				3

== See also ==
- United States presidential elections in Delaware
