= 1812 United States presidential election in Delaware =

- October 30 – December 2, 1812
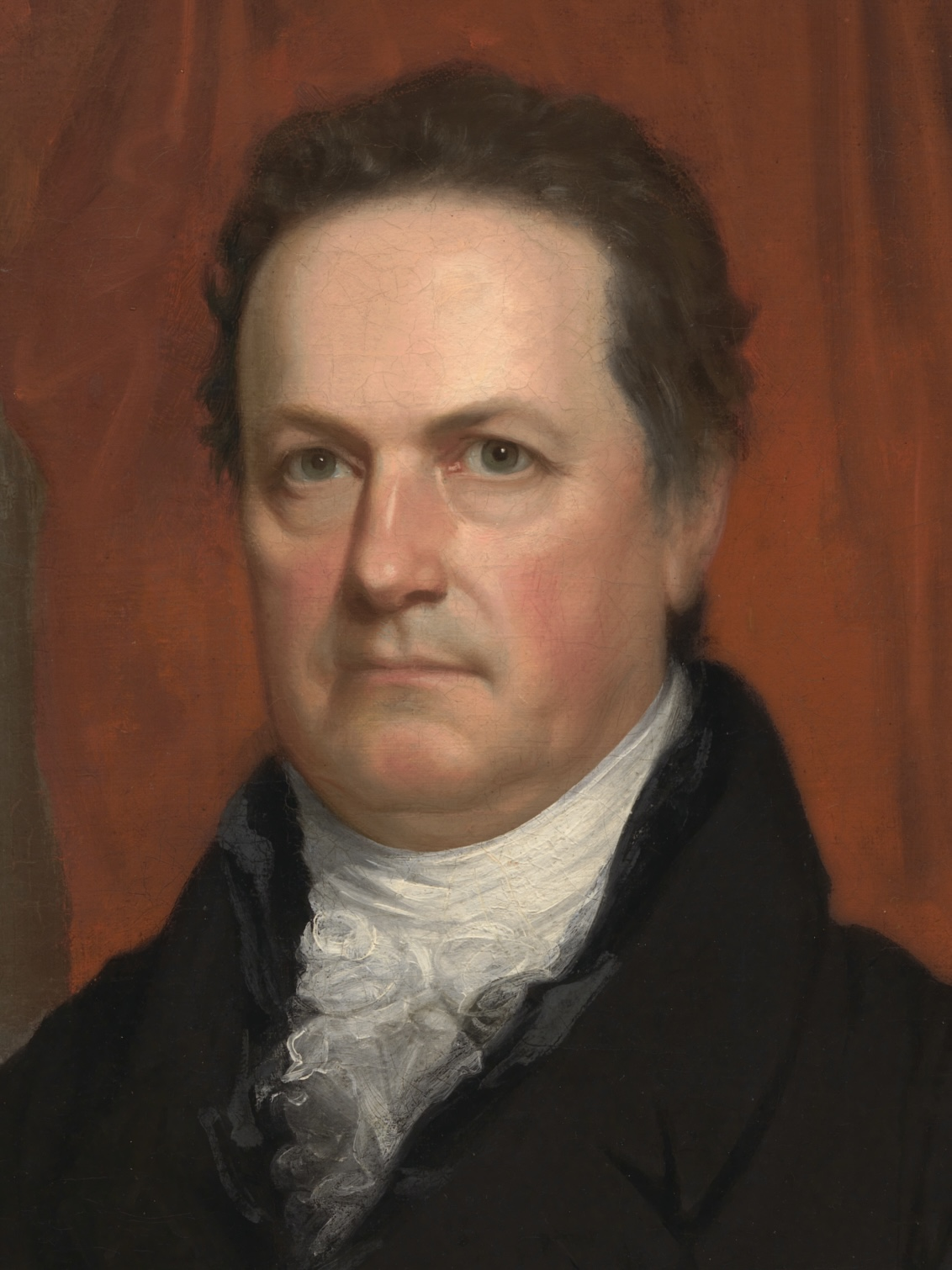
Nominee	DeWitt Clinton
Party	Democratic-Republican (Note: While commonly labeled as the Federalist candidate, Clinton technically ran as a Democratic-Republican and was not nominated by the Federalist party itself, the latter simply deciding not to field a candidate. This did not prevent endorsements from state Federalist parties (such as in Pennsylvania), but he received the endorsement from the New York state Democratic-Republicans as well.)
Alliance	Federalist
Home state	New York
Running mate	Jared Ingersoll
Electoral vote	4

The 1812 United States presidential election in Delaware took place between October 30 and December 2, 1812, as part of the 1812 United States presidential election. Voters chose four representatives, or electors to the Electoral College, who voted for President and Vice President. Delaware had gained one additional elector compared to the previous election in 1808.

Delaware cast four electoral votes for the Democratic-Republican and Federalist supported candidate DeWitt Clinton over the regular Democratic-Republican candidate, incumbent President James Madison. These electors were elected by the Delaware General Assembly, the state legislature, rather than by popular vote. The four electoral votes for Vice president were cast for Clinton's running mate Jared Ingersoll from Pennsylvania.

== Results ==
1812 United States presidential election in Delaware
Party	Candidate	Votes	Percentage	Electoral votes
Democratic Republican/Federalist	DeWitt Clinton	–	–	4
Democratic-Republican	James Madison (incumbent)	–	–	0
Totals		–	–	4

== See also ==
- United States presidential elections in Delaware
