= 1892 United States presidential election in Delaware =

- November 8, 1892

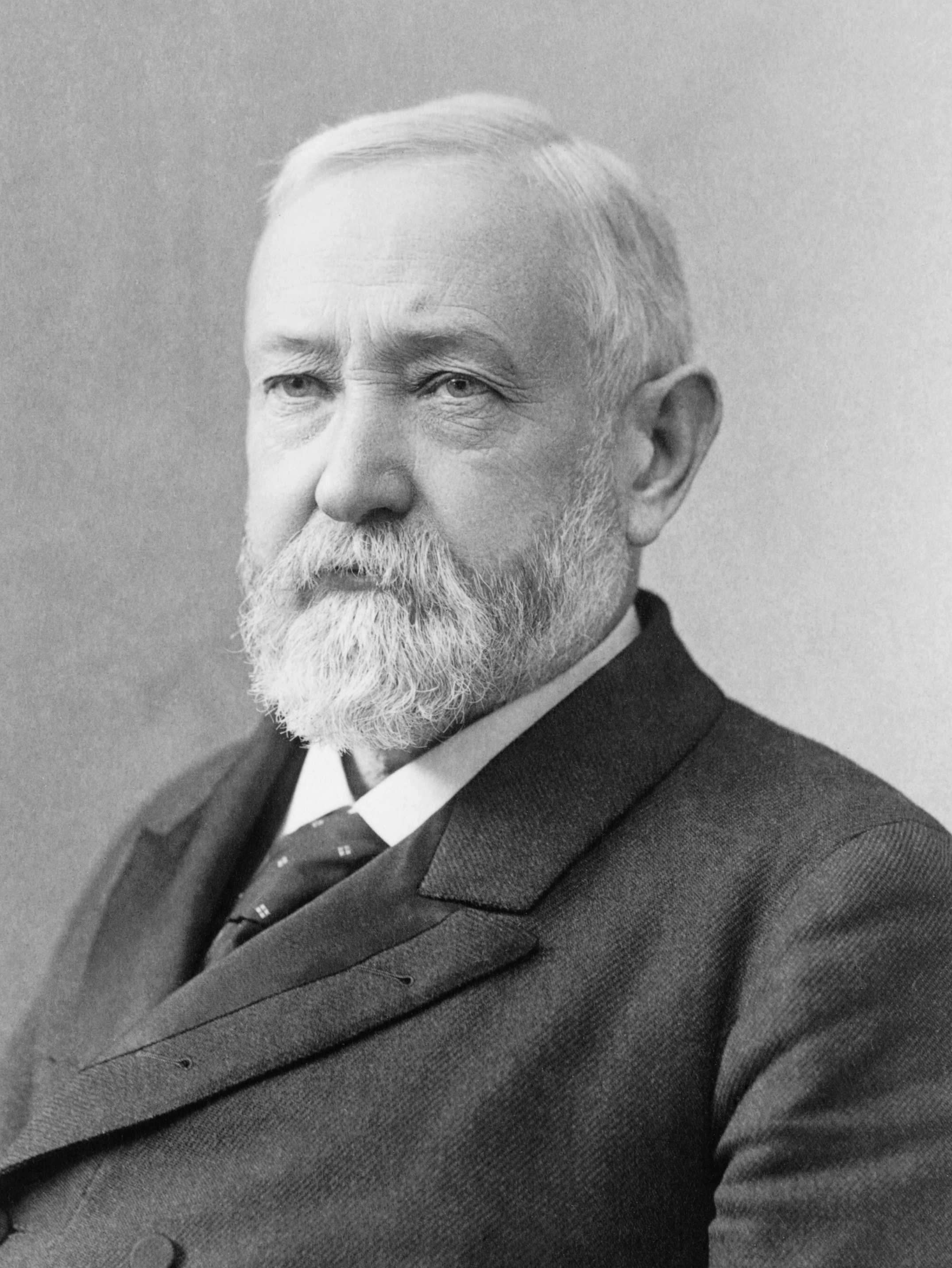
Nominee	Grover Cleveland	Benjamin Harrison
Party	Democratic	Republican
Home state	New York	Indiana
Running mate	Adlai Stevenson I	Whitelaw Reid
Electoral vote	3	0
Popular vote	18,581	18,077
Percentage	49.90%	48.55%
County results
Cleveland
40–50%
50–60%
President before election
Benjamin Harrison
Republican
Elected President
Grover Cleveland
Democratic

The 1892 United States presidential election in Delaware took place on November 8, 1892. All contemporary 44 states were part of the 1892 United States presidential election. State voters chose three electors to the Electoral College, which selected the president and vice president.

Delaware was won by the Democratic nominees, former President Grover Cleveland of New York and his running mate Adlai Stevenson I of Illinois.

Despite reclaiming the presidency, Cleveland performed much worse in Delaware than he did in his 1888 re-election bid. The State shifted 10 points for Benjamin Harrison, voting for Cleveland by only 1.4 percentage points. This would be one of four states where Harrison outperformed his initial run for the presidency in 1888. The other states were New Hampshire, Georgia and, South Carolina.

This is the last election in which Delaware voted Democratic until 1912; and the last in which it voted Democratic two or more consecutive times until 1940.

== Results ==
General Election Results
Party	Pledged to	Elector	Votes
Democratic Party	Grover Cleveland	Charles B. Lore	18,581
Democratic Party	Grover Cleveland	William H. Coulbourn	18,575
Democratic Party	Grover Cleveland	Ezekiel W. Cooper	18,572
Republican Party	Benjamin Harrison	Henry A. du Pont	18,077
Republican Party	Benjamin Harrison	Thomas Curry	18,072
Republican Party	Benjamin Harrison	Joseph R. Whitaker	18,068
Prohibition Party	John Bidwell	William G. Winner	564
Prohibition Party	John Bidwell	Richard M. Cooper	561
Prohibition Party	John Bidwell	Charles M. Marshall	561
Independent Colored Republican	Unpledged	A. Worthington Brinckley	13
Independent Colored Republican	Unpledged	William P. Prattis	13
Independent Colored Republican	Unpledged	Lewis Blockson	13
Votes cast (Note: Based on highest elector on each ticket)			37,235

=== Results by county ===
County	Grover Cleveland Democratic		Benjamin Harrison Republican		John Bidwell Prohibition		Margin		Total votes cast
County	#	%	#	%	#	%	#	%	Total votes cast
Kent	3,720	50.45%	3,550	48.14%	104	1.41%	170	2.31%	7,374
New Castle	10,583	49.63%	10,383	48.68%	345	1.62%	200	0.94%	21,324 (Note: Includes 13 votes for the Independent Colored Republican ticket)
Sussex	4,278	50.11%	4,144	48.54%	115	1.35%	134	1.57%	8,537
Totals	18,581	49.90%	18,077	48.55%	564	1.51%	504	1.35%	37,235

==== Counties that flipped from Republican to Democratic ====
- Sussex

== See also ==
- United States presidential elections in Delaware
