= 1960 United States presidential election in Delaware =

- November 8, 1960

Nominee	John F. Kennedy	Richard Nixon
Party	Democratic	Republican
Home state	Massachusetts	California
Running mate	Lyndon B. Johnson	Henry Cabot Lodge Jr.
Electoral vote	3	0
Popular vote	99,590	96,373
Percentage	50.63%	49.00%
County results
Kennedy
40–50%
50–60%
Nixon
50–60%
President before election
Dwight D. Eisenhower
Republican
Elected President
John F. Kennedy
Democratic

The 1960 United States presidential election in Delaware took place on November 8, 1960, as part of the 1960 United States presidential election. State voters chose three representatives, or electors, to the Electoral College, who voted for president and vice president.

Delaware was won by Senator John F. Kennedy (D–Massachusetts), running with Senator Lyndon B. Johnson, with 50.63% of the popular vote against incumbent Vice President Richard Nixon (R–California), running with United States Ambassador to the United Nations Henry Cabot Lodge Jr., with 49.00% of the popular vote.

== Results ==
1960 United States presidential election in Delaware
Party	Candidate	Votes	%
Democratic	John F. Kennedy	99,590	50.63%
Republican	Richard Nixon	96,373	49.00%
National States' Rights	Orval Faubus	354	0.18%
Prohibition	Rutherford Decker	284	0.14%
Socialist Labor	Eric Hass	82	0.04%
Total votes		196,683	100.00%

=== Results by county ===
County	John F. Kennedy Democratic		Richard Nixon Republican		All Others Various		Margin		Total votes cast
County	#	%	#	%	#	%	#	%	Total votes cast
Kent	10,754	49.75%	10,697	49.49%	165	0.76%	57	0.26%	21,616
New Castle	73,364	51.31%	69,284	48.46%	326	0.23%	4,080	2.85%	142,974
Sussex	15,472	48.21%	16,392	51.08%	229	0.71%	-920	-2.87%	32,093
Totals	99,590	50.63%	96,373	49.00%	720	0.37%	3,217	1.63%	196,683

==== Counties that flipped from Republican to Democratic ====
- Kent
- New Castle

== See also ==
- United States presidential elections in Delaware
