= 1836 United States presidential election in Delaware =

- November 7, 1836
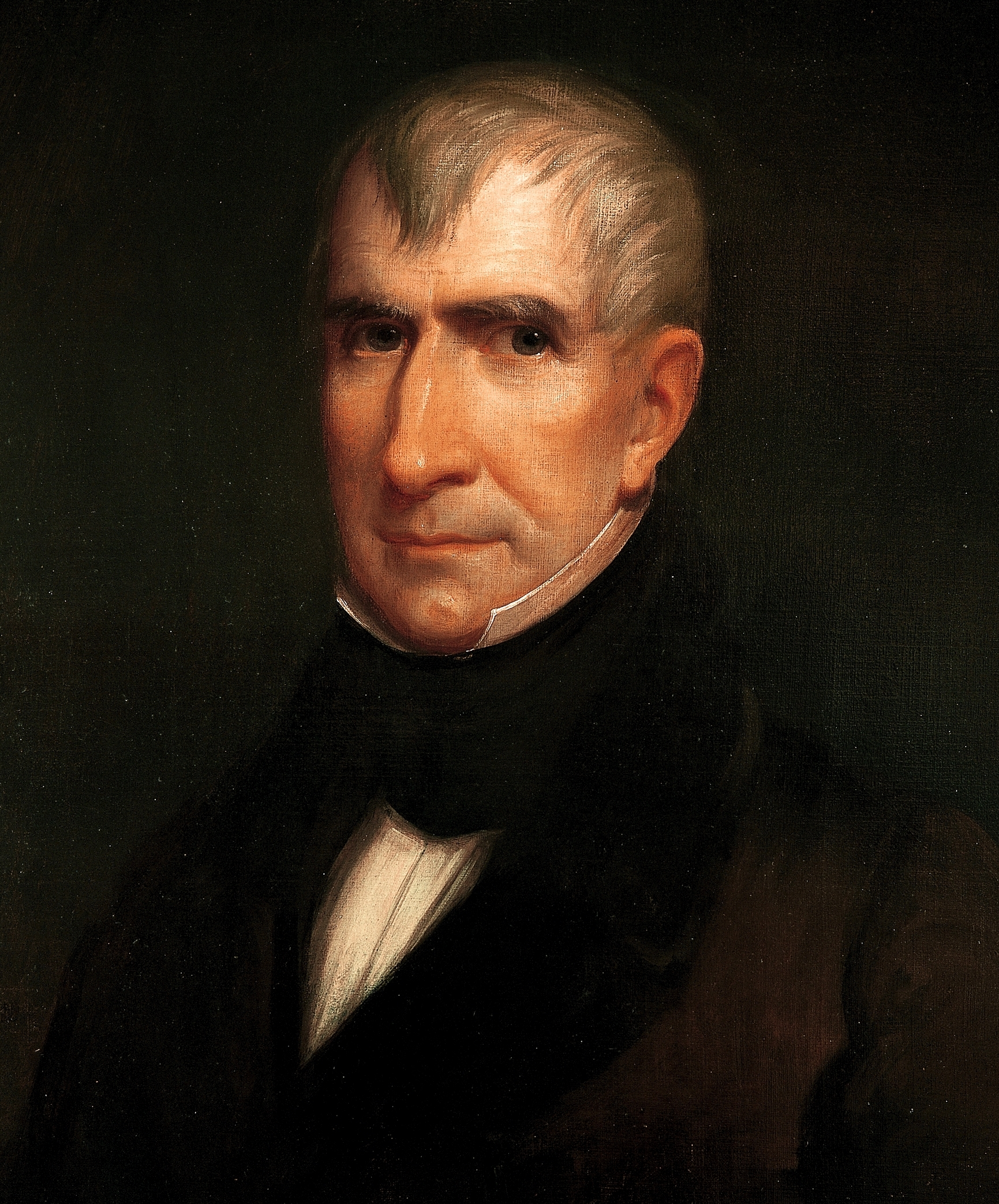

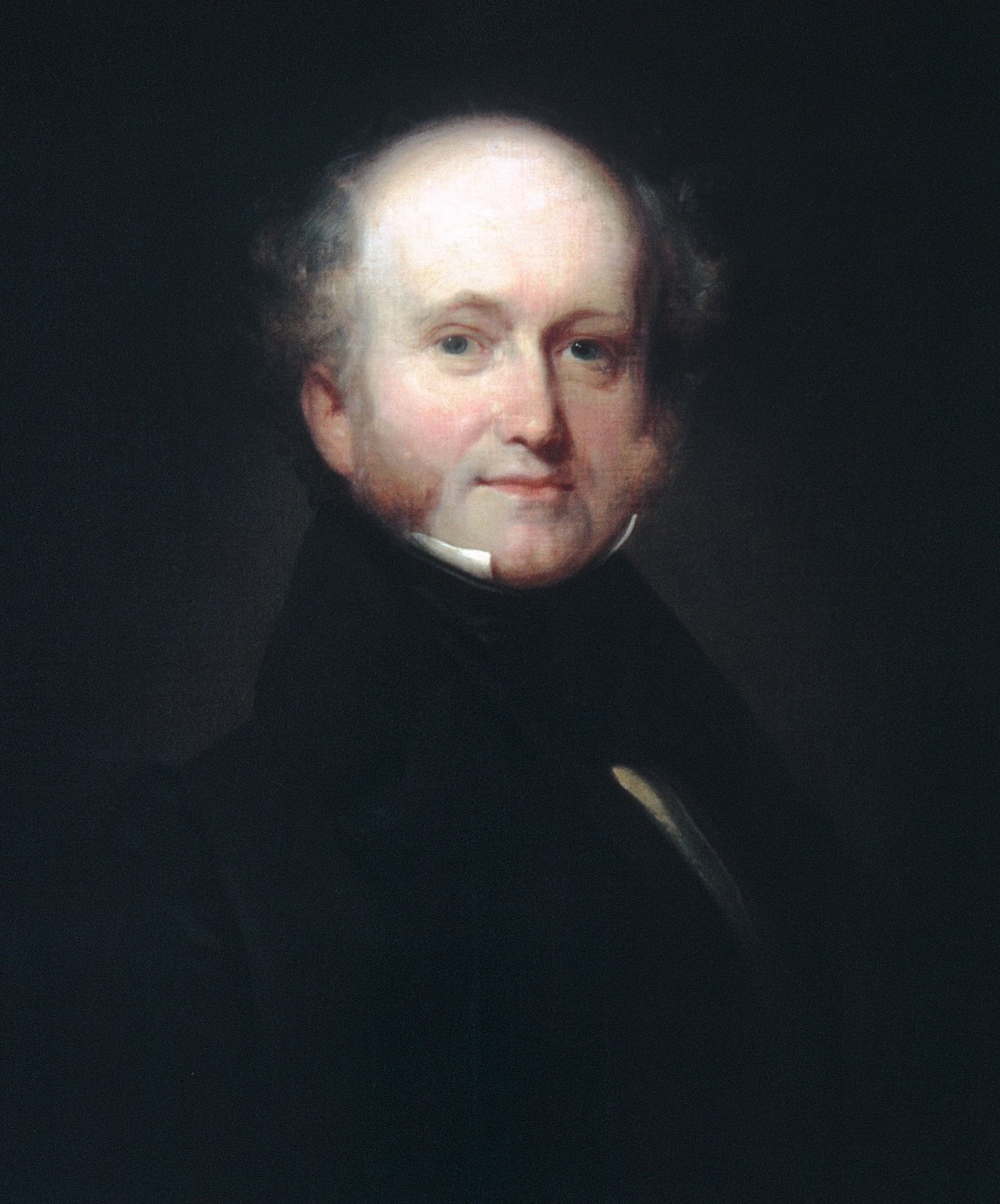
| Nominee | William Henry Harrison | Martin Van Buren |
| Party | Whig | Democratic |
| Home state | Ohio | New York |
| Running mate | Francis Granger | Richard Mentor Johnson |
| Electoral vote | 3 | 0 |
| Popular vote | 4,736 | 4,154 |
| Percentage | 53.24% | 46.70% |
County results
Harrison
50–60%
Van Buren
50–60%
President before election
Andrew Jackson
Democratic
Elected President
Martin Van Buren
Whig

The 1836 United States presidential election in Delaware was held on November 7, 1836 as part of the 1836 United States presidential election. Voters chose three representatives, or electors to the Electoral College, who voted for President and Vice President.

Delaware voted for Whig candidate William Henry Harrison over the Democratic candidate, Martin Van Buren. Harrison won Delaware by a margin of 6.54%.

== Results ==
General Election Results
| Party | Pledged to | Elector | Votes |
|---|---|---|---|
| Whig Party | William Henry Harrison | William Dunning | 4,736 |
| Whig Party | William Henry Harrison | William W. Morris | 4,736 |
| Whig Party | William Henry Harrison | Henry F. Hall | 4,731 |
| Democratic Party | Martin Van Buren | Samuel Paynter | 4,154 |
| Democratic Party | Martin Van Buren | Benjamin Potter | 4,152 |
| Democratic Party | Martin Van Buren | William Seal | 4,152 |
| Write-in | | Scattering | 5 |
| Votes cast (Note: Based on highest elector on each ticket) | | | 8,895 |

=== Results by county ===
| County | William Henry Harrison Whig | | Martin Van Buren Democratic | | Margin | | Total votes cast |
| County | # | % | # | % | # | % | Total votes cast |
|---|---|---|---|---|---|---|---|
| Kent | 1,207 | 53.74% | 1,039 | 46.26% | 168 | 7.48% | 2,246 |
| New Castle | 1,671 | 47.88% | 1,814 | 51.98% | -143 | -4.10% | 3,490 (Note: Includes the 5 Scattering votes) |
| Sussex | 1,858 | 58.82% | 1,301 | 41.18% | 557 | 17.63% | 3,159 |
| Totals | 4,736 | 53.24% | 4,154 | 46.70% | 582 | 6.54% | 8,895 |

== See also ==
- United States presidential elections in Delaware
