= 1944 United States presidential election in Delaware =

- November 7, 1944

All 3 Delaware votes to the Electoral College

Nominee	Franklin D. Roosevelt	Thomas E. Dewey
Party	Democratic	Republican
Home state	New York	New York
Running mate	Harry S. Truman	John W. Bricker
Electoral vote	3	0
Popular vote	68,166	56,747
Percentage	54.38%	45.27%
County results
Roosevelt
50–60%
Dewey
50–60%
President before election
Franklin D. Roosevelt
Democratic
Elected President
Franklin D. Roosevelt
Democratic

The 1944 United States presidential election in Delaware took place on November 7, 1944, as part of the 1944 United States presidential election. State voters chose three representatives, or electors, to the Electoral College, who voted for president and vice president.

Delaware was won by incumbent President Franklin D. Roosevelt (D–New York), running with Senator Harry S. Truman, with 54.38% of the popular vote, against Governor Thomas E. Dewey (R–New York), running with Governor John W. Bricker, with 45.27% of the popular vote.

== Results ==
1944 United States presidential election in Delaware
Party	Candidate	Votes	%
Democratic	Franklin D. Roosevelt (inc.)	68,166	54.38%
Republican	Thomas E. Dewey	56,747	45.27%
Prohibition	Claude A. Watson	294	0.23%
Socialist	Norman Thomas	154	0.12%
Total votes		125,361	100.00%

=== Results by County ===
County	Franklin D. Roosevelt Democratic		Thomas E. Dewey Republican		Claude A. Watson Prohibition		Norman Thomas Socialist		Margin		Total votes cast
County	#	%	#	%	#	%	#	%	#	%	Total votes cast
Kent	7,900	52.58%	7,069	47.05%	51	0.34%	6	0.04%	831	5.53%	15,026
New Castle	49,588	56.55%	37,783	43.09%	180	0.21%	138	0.16%	11,805	13.46%	87,689
Sussex	10,678	47.15%	11,895	52.53%	63	0.28%	10	0.04%	-1,217	-5.37%	22,646
Totals	68,166	54.38%	56,747	45.27%	294	0.23%	154	0.12%	11,419	9.11%	125,361

==== Counties that flipped from Democratic to Republican ====
- Sussex

== See also ==
- United States presidential elections in Delaware
