= 1928 United States presidential election in Delaware =

- November 6, 1928

Nominee	Herbert Hoover	Al Smith
Party	Republican	Democratic
Home state	California	New York
Running mate	Charles Curtis	Joseph T. Robinson
Electoral vote	3	0
Popular vote	68,860	35,354
Percentage	65.83%	33.80%
County results
Hoover
50–60%
60–70%
President before election
Calvin Coolidge
Republican
Elected President
Herbert Hoover
Republican

The 1928 United States presidential election in Delaware took place on November 6, 1928. All contemporary 48 states were part of the 1928 United States presidential election. State voters chose three electors to the Electoral College, which selected the president and vice president.

Delaware was won by Republican former Secretary of Commerce Herbert Hoover of California, who was running against Democratic Governor of New York Alfred E. Smith. Hoover's running mate was Senate Majority Leader Charles Curtis of Kansas, while Smith's running mate was Senator Joseph Taylor Robinson of Arkansas.

Hoover won with a majority of 65.83% of the vote to Smith's 33.80%, a margin of 32.03%. Socialist candidate Norman Thomas finished a distant third, with 0.31%. Hoover's performance is the best by any presidential candidate in Delaware, surpassing its nearest rival from Barack Obama in 2008 by 3.12%. In this election, Delaware voted 13% to the right of the nation at-large.

== Results ==
General Election Results
Party	Pledged to	Elector	Votes
Republican Party	Herbert Hoover	Charles Warner	68,860
Republican Party	Herbert Hoover	William T. Chipman	68,707
Republican Party	Herbert Hoover	Frank L. Grier	68,580
Democratic Party	Al Smith	James Rogers Holcomb	35,354
Democratic Party	Al Smith	Andrew J. Lynch	35,225
Democratic Party	Al Smith	Robert Y. Wallen	35,150 (Note: The stated total for Wallen is 36,643 but this is clearly a mistake and wildly inconsistent with the rest of the Democratic ticket. Part of the discrepancy is possibly attributable to Sussex County. Some earlier newspaper reports give Wallen's total there as 7,446, but that itself is a mistake because the results of the individual districts do not add up to that figure. The 11/9/1928 Milford Chronicle lists the official Sussex County vote, giving Wallen 7,013, which is also a typo because the district figures add up to 7,113, which is the figure used in the official statewide canvass.)
Socialist Party	Norman Thomas	Fred W. Whiteside	329
Socialist Party	Norman Thomas	Thomas E. White	287
Socialist Party	Norman Thomas	Theodore Burrier	283
Workers Party	William Z. Foster	Albert S. Walton	59
Workers Party	William Z. Foster	Rose Richterman	58
Workers Party	William Z. Foster	Arthur S. Bernardini	55
Votes cast (Note: Based on highest elector on each ticket)			104,602

=== Results by county ===
County	Herbert Hoover Republican		Al Smith Democratic		Norman Thomas Socialist		William Z. Foster Workers		Margin		Total votes cast
County	#	%	#	%	#	%	#	%	#	%	Total votes cast
Kent	8,335	59.16%	5,727	40.65%	27	0.19%	0	0.00%	2,608	18.51%	14,089
New Castle	47,641	67.66%	22,464	31.90%	248	0.35%	59	0.08%	25,177	35.76%	70,412
Sussex	12,884	64.10%	7,163	35.64%	54	0.27%	0	0.00%	5,721	28.46%	20,101
Totals	68,860	65.83%	35,354	33.80%	329	0.31%	59	0.06%	33,506	32.03%	104,602

==== Counties that flipped from Democratic to Republican ====
- Kent

== See also ==
- United States presidential elections in Delaware
- Presidency of Herbert Hoover
