= 1884 United States presidential election in Delaware =

- November 4, 1884

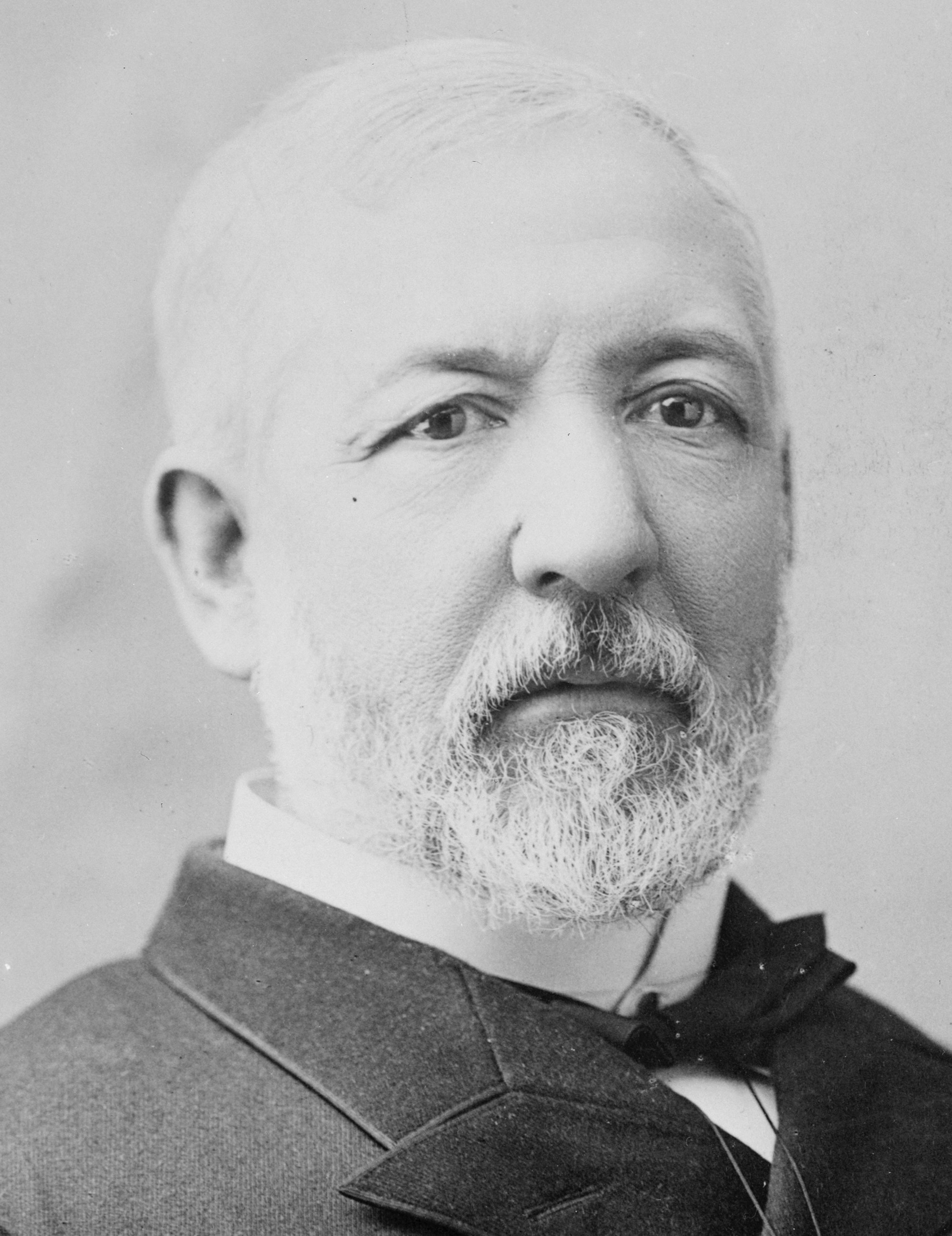
Nominee	Grover Cleveland	James G. Blaine
Party	Democratic	Republican
Home state	New York	Maine
Running mate	Thomas A. Hendricks	John A. Logan
Electoral vote	3	0
Popular vote	16,976	12,953
Percentage	56.58%	43.17%
County results
Cleveland
50–60%
60–70%
President before election
Chester A. Arthur
Republican
Elected President
Grover Cleveland
Democratic

The 1884 United States presidential election in Delaware took place on November 4, 1884, as part of the 1884 United States presidential election. Voters chose three representatives, or electors to the Electoral College, who voted for president and vice president.

Delaware voted for the Democratic nominee, Grover Cleveland, over the Republican nominee, James G. Blaine. Cleveland won the state by a margin of 13.41%.

== Results ==
General Election Results
Party	Pledged to	Elector	Votes
Democratic Party	Grover Cleveland	Nathan Pratt	16,976
Democratic Party	Grover Cleveland	J. Turpin Moore	16,958
Democratic Party	Grover Cleveland	Peter N. Brennan	16,957
Republican Party	James G. Blaine	Henry du Pont	12,953
Republican Party	James G. Blaine	Simeon Pennewill	12,951
Republican Party	James G. Blaine	Joseph S. Truitt	12,919
Prohibition Party	John St. John	Alexander Barney	64
Prohibition Party	John St. John	William S. Jones	64
Prohibition Party	John St. John	George Keithley	64
Greenback Party	Benjamin Butler	Benjamin D. Ling	10
Greenback Party	Benjamin Butler	Jacob Satterthwaite	10
Greenback Party	Benjamin Butler	George M. Thoroughgood	10
Votes cast (Note: Based on highest elector on each ticket)			30,003

=== Results by county ===
County	Grover Cleveland Democratic		James G. Blaine Republican		John St. John Prohibition		Benjamin Butler Greenback		Margin		Total votes cast
County	#	%	#	%	#	%	#	%	#	%	Total votes cast
Kent	3,975	65.15%	2,126	34.85%	0	0.00%	0	0.00%	1,849	30.31%	6,101
New Castle	8,554	52.07%	7,809	47.54%	64	0.39%	0	0.00%	745	4.54%	16,427
Sussex	4,447	59.49%	3,018	40.37%	0	0.00%	10	0.13%	1,429	19.12%	7,475
Totals	16,976	56.58%	12,953	43.17%	64	0.21%	10	0.03%	4,023	13.41%	30,003

==== Counties that flipped from Republican to Democratic ====
- New Castle

== See also ==
- United States presidential elections in Delaware
