= 1876 United States presidential election in Delaware =

- November 7, 1876
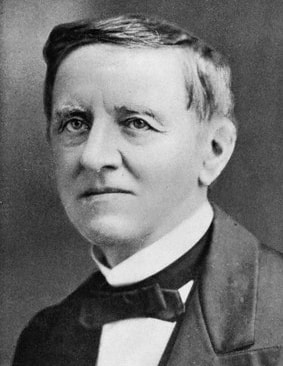

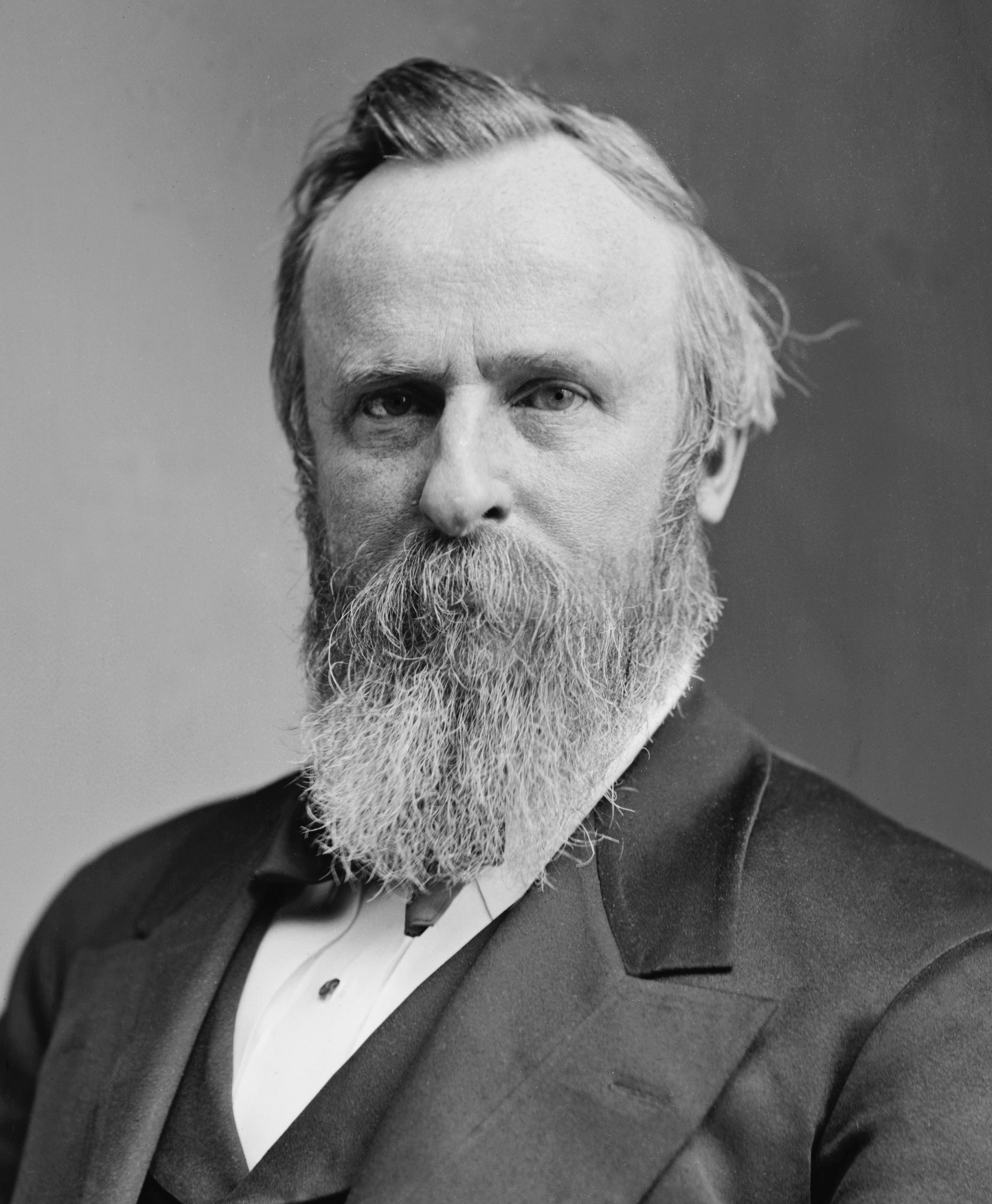
Nominee	Samuel J. Tilden	Rutherford B. Hayes
Party	Democratic	Republican
Home state	New York	Ohio
Running mate	Thomas A. Hendricks	William A. Wheeler
Electoral vote	3	0
Popular vote	13,381	10,752
Percentage	55.45%	44.55%
County results
Tilden
50–60%
60–70%
President before election
Ulysses S. Grant
Republican
Elected President
Rutherford B. Hayes
Republican

The 1876 United States presidential election in Delaware took place on November 7, 1876, as part of the 1876 United States presidential election. State voters chose three representatives, or electors, to the Electoral College, who voted for president and vice president.

Delaware was won by Samuel J. Tilden, the former governor of New York (D–New York), running with Thomas A. Hendricks, the governor of Indiana and future vice president, with 55.45% of the popular vote, against Rutherford B. Hayes, the governor of Ohio (R-Ohio), running with Representative William A. Wheeler, with 44.55% of the vote.

== Results ==
General Election Results
Party	Pledged to	Elector	Votes
Democratic Party	Samuel J. Tilden	John H. Rodney	13,381
Democratic Party	Samuel J. Tilden	George W. Willen	13,370
Democratic Party	Samuel J. Tilden	John W. Sharp	13,369
Republican Party	Rutherford B. Hayes	Jacob Moore	10,752
Republican Party	Rutherford B. Hayes	Nathaniel B. Smithers	10,744
Republican Party	Rutherford B. Hayes	Henry du Pont	10,740
Votes cast (Note: Based on highest elector on each ticket)			24,133

=== Results by county ===
County	Samuel J. Tilden Democratic		Rutherford B. Hayes Republican		Margin		Total votes cast
County	#	%	#	%	#	%	Total votes cast
Kent	3,278	62.88%	1,935	37.12%	1,343	25.76%	5,213
New Castle	6,613	52.21%	6,054	47.79%	559	4.41%	12,667
Sussex	3,490	55.81%	2,763	44.19%	727	11.63%	6,253
Totals	13,381	55.45%	10,752	44.55%	2,629	10.89%	24,133

==== Counties that flipped from Republican to Democratic ====
- New Castle
- Sussex

== See also ==
- United States presidential elections in Delaware
