= 1968 United States presidential election in Delaware =

- November 5, 1968

Nominee	Richard Nixon	Hubert Humphrey	George Wallace
Party	Republican	Democratic	American Independent
Home state	New York (Note: Although he was born in California and served as a U.S. Representative and Senator from California, in 1968 Richard Nixon's official state of residence was New York, because he moved there to practice law after his defeat in the 1962 California gubernatorial election. During his first term as president, Nixon re-established his residency in California. Consequently, most reliable reference books list Nixon's home state as New York in the 1968 election and his home state as California in the 1972 (and 1960) election.)	Minnesota	Alabama
Running mate	Spiro Agnew	Edmund Muskie	Curtis LeMay
Electoral vote	3	0	0
Popular vote	96,714	89,194	28,459
Percentage	45.12%	41.61%	13.28%

Nixon
30–40%
40–50%
50–60%
60–70%
Humphrey
40–50%
50–60%
60–70%
70–80%
80–90%
President before election
Lyndon B Johnson
Democratic
Elected President
Richard Nixon
Republican

The 1968 United States presidential election in Delaware was held on November 5, 1968. State voters chose three representatives, or electors, to the Electoral College, who voted for president and vice president.

Delaware was won by the Republican former Vice President Richard Nixon, who won the state by 7,529 votes over Democratic incumbent Vice President Hubert Humphrey. Also running was former and future Alabama Governor George Wallace on the "American Independent" ticket.

== Results ==
1968 United States presidential election in Delaware
Party	Candidate	Votes	%
Republican	Richard Nixon	96,714	45.12%
Democratic	Hubert Humphrey	89,194	41.61%
American Independent	George Wallace	28,459	13.28%
Total votes		214,367	100.00%

=== Results by county ===
County	Richard Nixon Republican		Hubert Humphrey Democratic		George Wallace American Independent		Margin		Total votes cast
County	#	%	#	%	#	%	#	%	Total votes cast
Kent	11,082	44.53%	9,055	36.38%	4,751	19.09%	2,027	8.15%	24,888
New Castle	70,014	44.76%	68,468	43.77%	17,931	11.47%	1,546	0.99%	156,413
Sussex	15,618	47.23%	11,671	35.30%	5,777	17.47%	3,947	11.93%	33,066
Totals	96,714	45.12%	89,194	41.61%	28,459	13.27%	7,520	3.51%	214,367

==== Counties that flipped from Democratic to Republican ====
- Kent
- New Castle
- Sussex

== See also ==
- United States presidential elections in Delaware
