= 1880 United States presidential election in Delaware =

- November 2, 1880
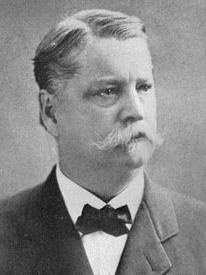

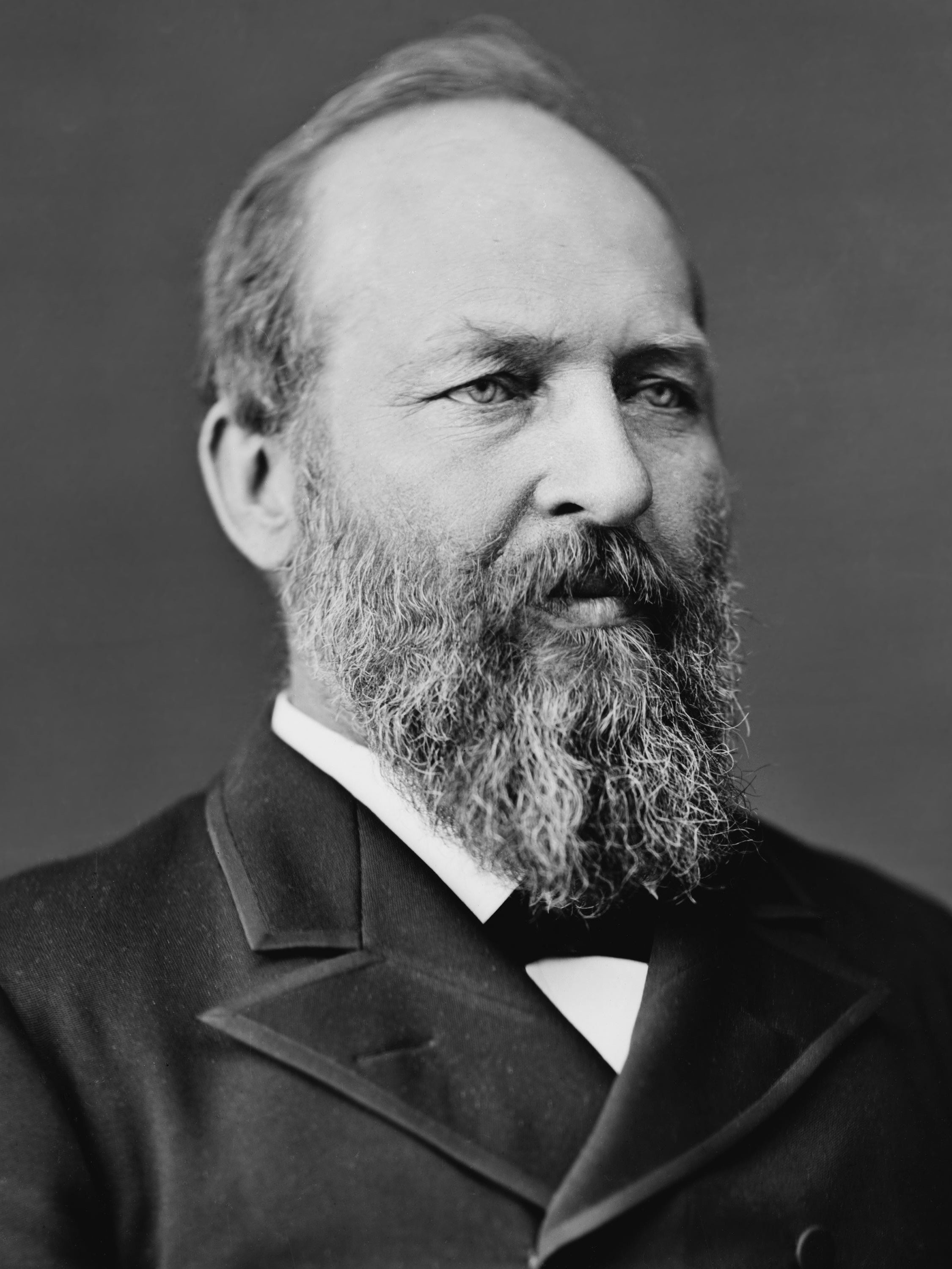
Nominee	Winfield Scott Hancock	James A. Garfield
Party	Democratic	Republican
Home state	Pennsylvania	Ohio
Running mate	William Hayden English	Chester A. Arthur
Electoral vote	3	0
Popular vote	15,181	14,148
Percentage	51.53%	48.03%
County results
Hancock
50–60%
Garfield
50–60%
President before election
Rutherford B. Hayes
Republican
Elected President
James Garfield
Republican

The 1880 United States presidential election in Delaware took place on November 2, 1880, as part of the 1880 United States presidential election. State voters chose three representatives, or electors, to the Electoral College, who voted for president and vice president.

Delaware was won by General Winfield Scott Hancock (D–Pennsylvania), running with former Representative William Hayden English, with 51.53% of the popular vote, against Representative James A. Garfield (R-Ohio), running with the 10th chairman of the New York State Republican Executive Committee Chester A. Arthur, with 48.03% of the vote.

As of 2026, this is the most recent time that a Republican won the presidency without carrying Sussex County.

== Results ==
General Election Results
Party	Pledged to	Elector	Votes
Democratic Party	Winfield Scott Hancock	Albert Whiteley	15,181
Democratic Party	Winfield Scott Hancock	Charles B. Lore	15,172
Democratic Party	Winfield Scott Hancock	George Russell	15,164
Republican Party	James A. Garfield	John D. Rodney	14,148
Republican Party	James A. Garfield	Henry du Pont	14,138
Republican Party	James A. Garfield	Daniel P. Barnard Jr.	14,128
Greenback Party	James B. Weaver	Daniel G. Fisher	121
Greenback Party	James B. Weaver	Benjamin B. Cooper	120
Greenback Party	James B. Weaver	Alexander Humphreys	120
Write-in		Scattering	8
Votes cast (Note: Based on highest elector on each ticket)			29,458

=== Results by county ===
County	Winfield S. Hancock Democratic		James A. Garfield Republican		James B. Weaver Greenback		Margin		Total votes cast
County	#	%	#	%	#	%	#	%	Total votes cast
Kent	3,665	54.62%	3,042	45.34%	0	0.00%	623	9.28%	6,710 (Note: Includes 3 Scattering votes)
New Castle	7,623	49.53%	7,724	50.19%	38	0.25%	-101	-0.66%	15,390 (Note: Includes 5 Scattering votes)
Sussex	3,893	52.91%	3,382	45.96%	83	1.13%	511	6.94%	7,358
Totals	15,181	51.53%	14,148	48.03%	121	0.41%	1,033	3.51%	29,458

==== Counties that flipped from Democratic to Republican ====
- New Castle

== See also ==
- United States presidential elections in Delaware
