= 1920 United States presidential election in Delaware =

- November 2, 1920
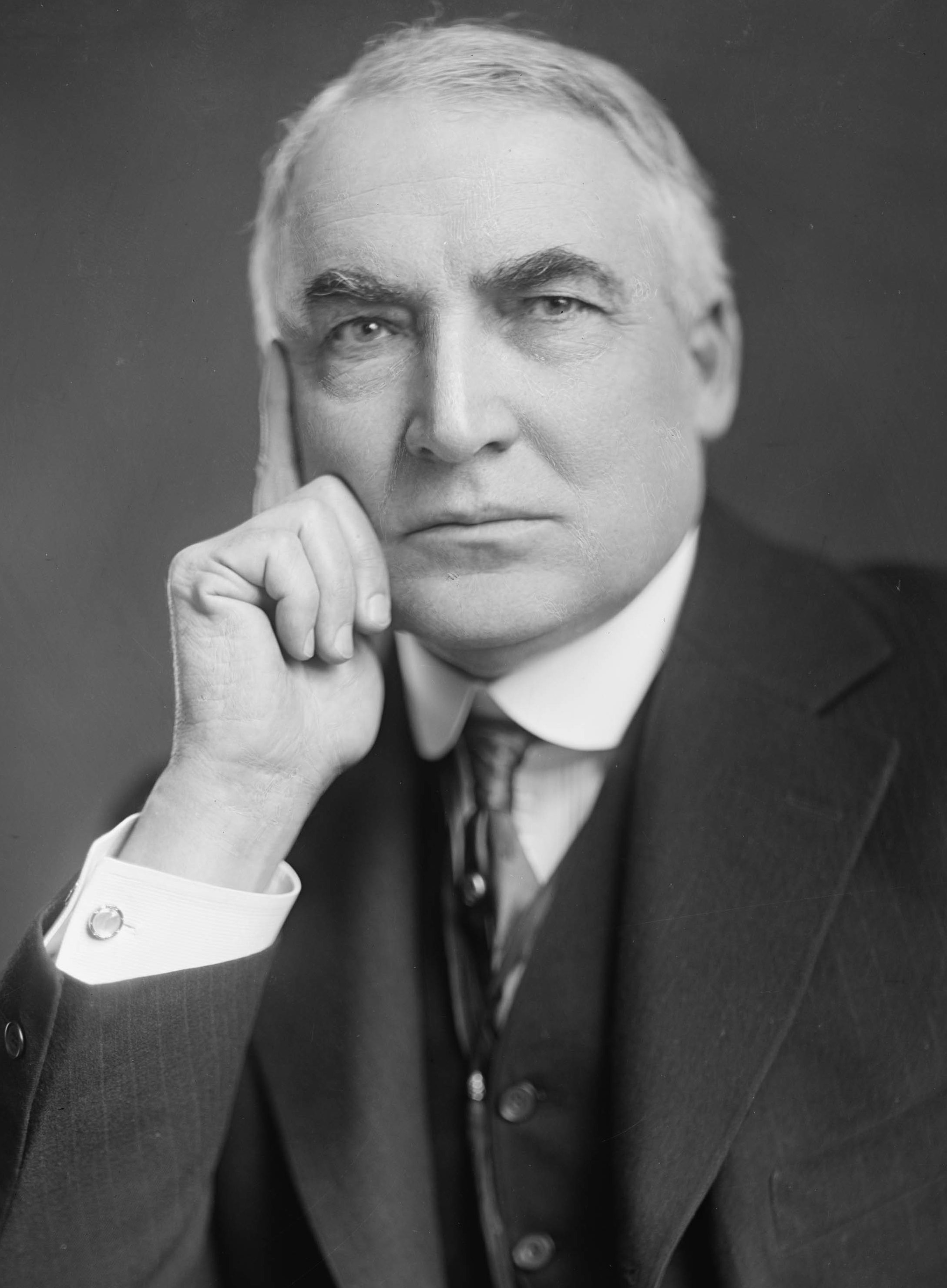

Nominee	Warren G. Harding	James M. Cox
Party	Republican	Democratic
Home state	Ohio	Ohio
Running mate	Calvin Coolidge	Franklin D. Roosevelt
Electoral vote	3	0
Popular vote	52,858	39,911
Percentage	55.71%	42.07%
County results
Harding
50–60%
Cox
50–60%
President before election
Woodrow Wilson
Democratic
Elected President
Warren G. Harding
Republican

The 1920 United States presidential election in Delaware took place on November 2, 1920. All contemporary 48 states were part of the 1920 United States presidential election. State voters chose three electors to the Electoral College, which selected the president and vice president.

Delaware was won by the Republican nominee, Senator Warren G. Harding of Ohio, over the Democratic nominee, Governor James M. Cox of Ohio. Harding ran with Governor Calvin Coolidge of Massachusetts, while Cox ran with future President Franklin D. Roosevelt of New York.

== Results ==
General Election Results
Party	Pledged to	Elector	Votes
Republican Party	Warren G. Harding	Henry A. du Pont	52,858
Republican Party	Warren G. Harding	Alden R. Benson	52,627
Republican Party	Warren G. Harding	John G. Townsend Jr.	52,230
Democratic Party	James M. Cox	George Gray	39,911
Democratic Party	James M. Cox	Joseph H. Cox	39,844
Democratic Party	James M. Cox	Francis M. Soper	39,623
Socialist Party	Eugene V. Debs	William Canby Ferris	988
Prohibition Party	Aaron S. Watkins	Martha S. Cranston	986
Prohibition Party	Aaron S. Watkins	Lillian Cade	979
Prohibition Party	Aaron S. Watkins	John Heyd	976
Socialist Party	Eugene V. Debs	Fred W. Whiteside	964
Socialist Party	Eugene V. Debs	Clarence W. Johnson	958
Independent	Parley P. Christensen	Nicholas J. Lannan	93
Independent	Parley P. Christensen	Maurice Walsh	82
Independent	Parley P. Christensen	Isidor Straus	78
Single Tax Party	Robert C. Macauley	Louis Kramer	39
Single Tax Party	Robert C. Macauley	Charles E. Duling	34
Single Tax Party	Robert C. Macauley	Samuel Melville	34
Votes cast (Note: Based on highest elector on each ticket)			94,875

=== Results by county ===
County	Warren G. Harding Republican		James M. Cox Democratic		Eugene V. Debs Socialist		Aaron S. Watkins Prohibition		Parley P. Christensen Independent		Robert C. Macauley Single Tax		Margin		Total votes cast
County	#	%	#	%	#	%	#	%	#	%	#	%	#	%	Total votes cast
Kent	6,511	46.88%	7,211	51.92%	0	0.00%	167	1.20%	0	0.00%	0	0.00%	-700	-5.04%	13,889
New Castle	36,600	58.29%	24,252	38.62%	988	1.57%	819	1.30%	93	0.15%	39	0.06%	12,348	19.67%	62,791
Sussex	9,747	53.57%	8,448	46.43%	0	0.00%	0	0.00%	0	0.00%	0	0.00%	1,299	7.14%	18,195
Totals	52,858	55.71%	39,911	42.07%	988	1.04%	986	1.04%	93	0.10%	39	0.04%	12,947	13.65%	94,875

== See also ==
- United States presidential elections in Delaware
