= 1904 United States presidential election in Delaware =

- November 8, 1904
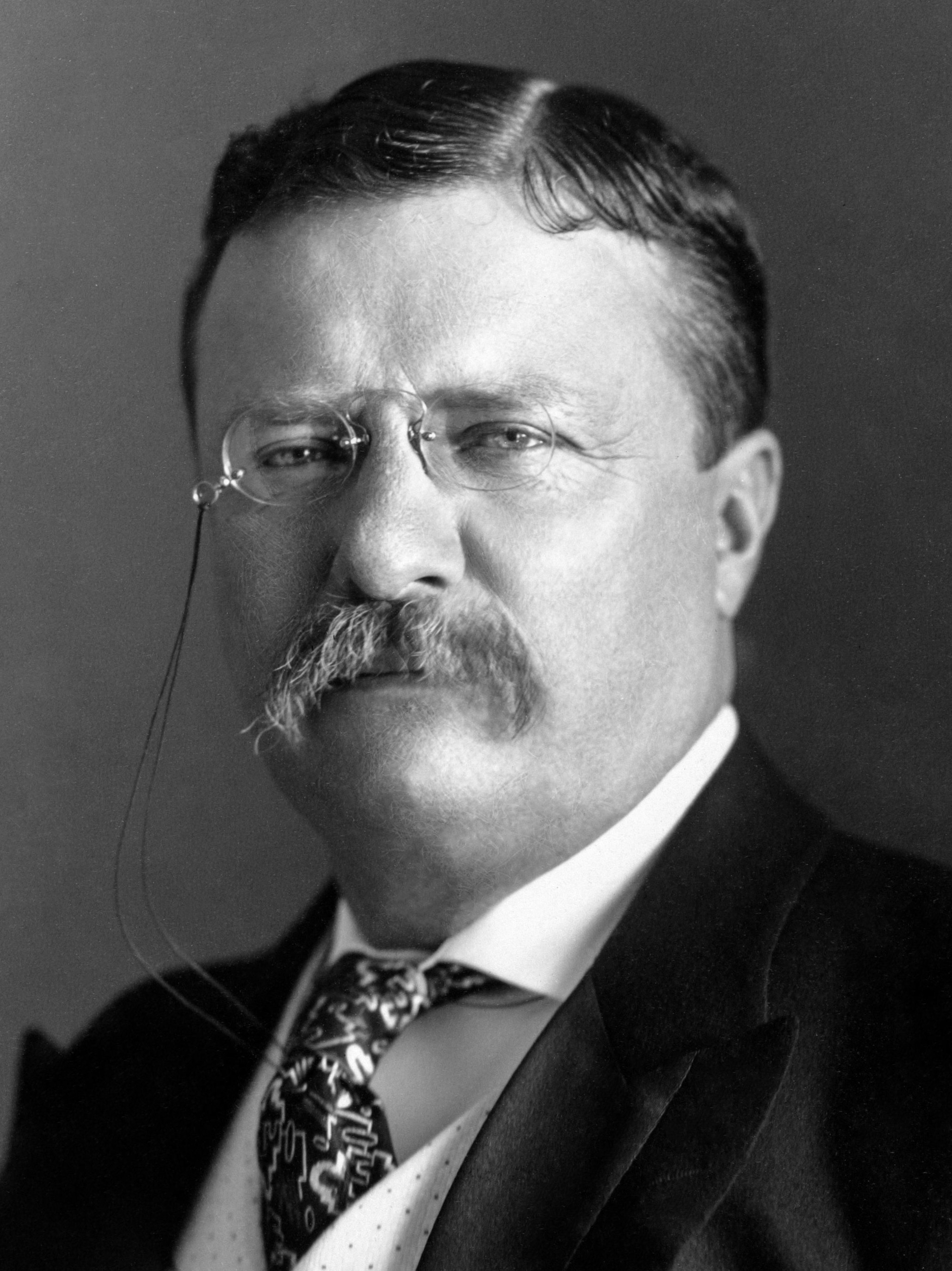

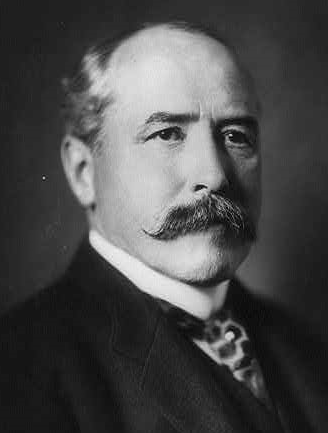
Nominee	Theodore Roosevelt	Alton B. Parker
Party	Republican	Democratic
Home state	New York	New York
Running mate	Charles W. Fairbanks	Henry G. Davis
Electoral vote	3	0
Popular vote	23,712	19,359
Percentage	54.04%	44.12%
County results
Roosevelt
50–60%
President before election
Theodore Roosevelt
Republican
Elected President
Theodore Roosevelt
Republican

The 1904 United States presidential election in Delaware took place on November 8, 1904. All contemporary 45 states were part of the 1904 United States presidential election. State voters chose three electors to the Electoral College, which selected the president and vice president.

Delaware was won by the Republican nominees, incumbent President Theodore Roosevelt of New York and his running mate Charles W. Fairbanks of Indiana. They defeated the Democratic nominees, former Chief Judge of New York Court of Appeals Alton B. Parker and his running mate Henry G. Davis. Roosevelt won the state by a margin of 9.92%.

== Results ==
General Election Results
Party	Pledged to	Elector	Votes
Republican Party	Theodore Roosevelt	Manlove Hayes	23,712
Republican Party	Theodore Roosevelt	Thomas H. Savery	23,705
Republican Party	Theodore Roosevelt	William P. Orr	23,695
Democratic Party	Alton B. Parker	Landreth L. Layton	19,359
Democratic Party	Alton B. Parker	J. Harvey Whiteman	19,347
Democratic Party	Alton B. Parker	Nicholas R. Johnson	19,341
Prohibition Party	Silas C. Swallow	Richard W. Brown	607
Prohibition Party	Silas C. Swallow	John Hutton	604
Prohibition Party	Silas C. Swallow	John W. West	604
Socialist Party	Eugene V. Debs	Max E. Goetz	146
Socialist Party	Eugene V. Debs	Bernard Hohlfeldt	145
Socialist Party	Eugene V. Debs	William F. Lynch	143
People's Party	Thomas E. Watson	John McCrary	51
People's Party	Thomas E. Watson	Charles G. Prettyman	51
People's Party	Thomas E. Watson	William B. Pyle	51
Votes cast (Note: Based on highest elector on each ticket)			43,875

=== Results by county ===
County	Theodore Roosevelt Republican		Alton B. Parker Democratic		Silas C. Swallow Prohibition		Eugene V. Debs Socialist		Thomas E. Watson Populist		Margin		Total votes cast
County	#	%	#	%	#	%	#	%	#	%	#	%	Total votes cast
Kent	4,599	54.14%	3,779	44.48%	117	1.38%	0	0.00%	0	0.00%	820	9.65%	8,495
New Castle	13,198	53.00%	11,170	44.85%	339	1.36%	146	0.59%	51	0.20%	2,028	8.14%	24,904
Sussex	5,915	56.46%	4,410	42.10%	151	1.44%	0	0.00%	0	0.00%	1,505	14.37%	10,476
Totals	23,712	54.04%	19,359	44.12%	607	1.38%	146	0.33%	51	0.12%	4,353	9.92%	43,875

== See also ==
- United States presidential elections in Delaware
