= 1868 United States presidential election in Delaware =

- November 3, 1868
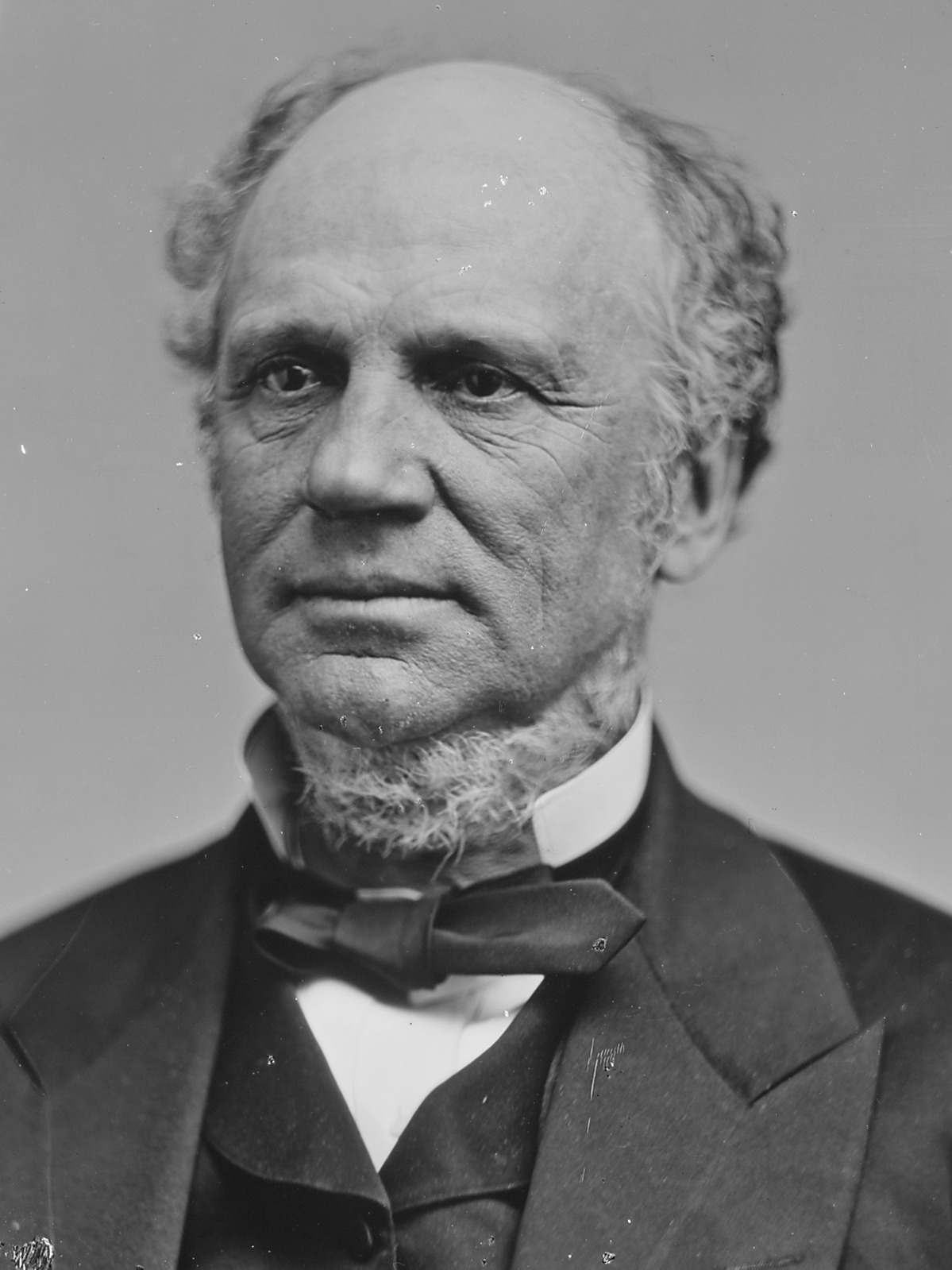

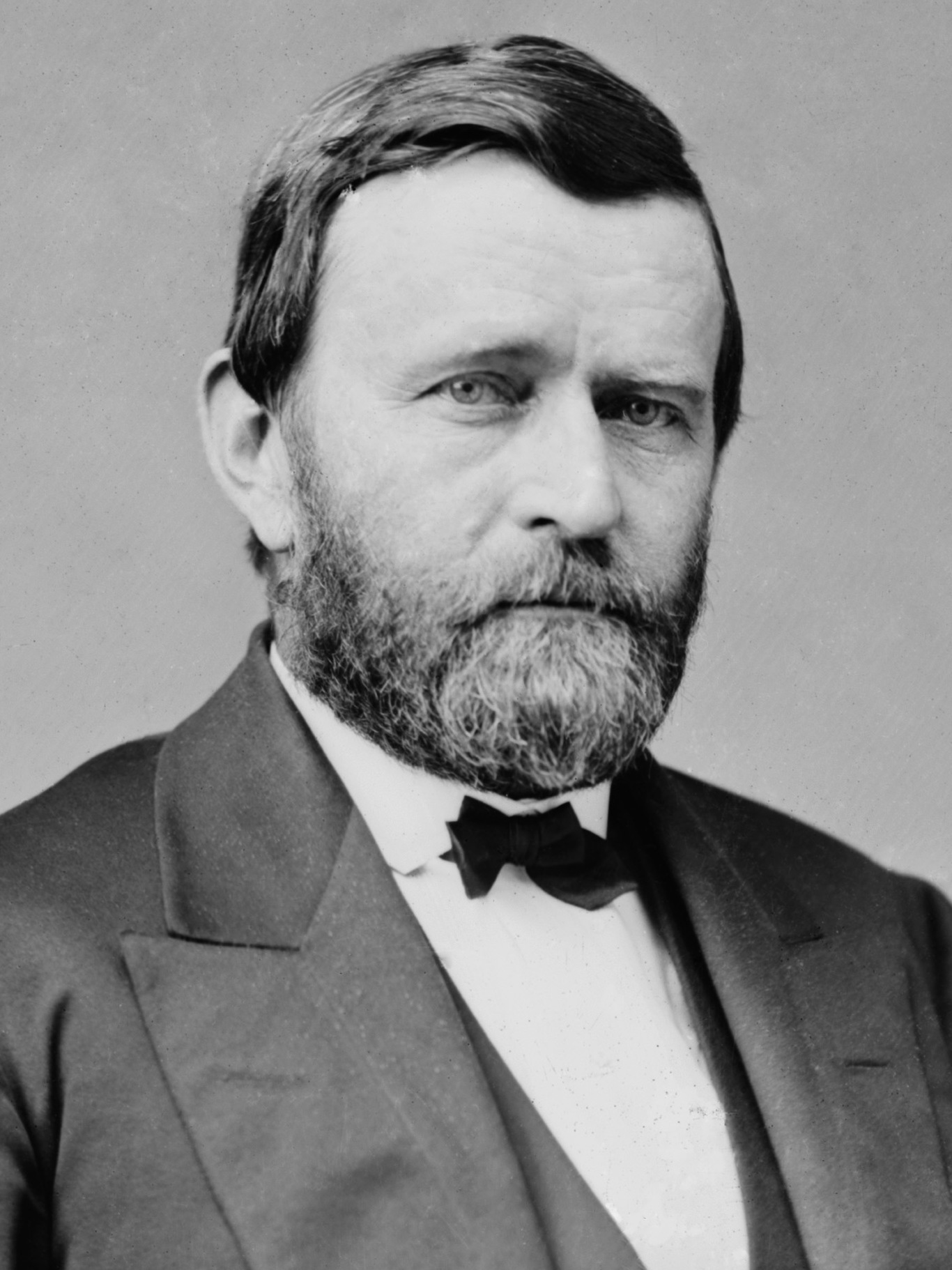
Nominee	Horatio Seymour	Ulysses S. Grant
Party	Democratic	Republican
Home state	New York	Illinois
Running mate	Francis Preston Blair Jr.	Schuyler Colfax
Electoral vote	3	0
Popular vote	10,957	7,614
Percentage	59.00%	41.00%
County results
Seymour
50–60%
60–70%
President before election
Andrew Johnson
Democratic
Elected President
Ulysses S. Grant
Republican

The 1868 United States presidential election in Delaware took place on November 3, 1868, as part of the 1868 United States presidential election. Voters chose three representatives, or electors to the Electoral College, who voted for president and vice president.

Delaware voted for the Democratic nominee, Horatio Seymour, over the Republican nominee, Ulysses S. Grant. Seymour won the state by a margin of 18%.

With 59% of the popular vote, Delaware would prove to be Seymour's fifth strongest state in terms of popular vote percentage after Kentucky, Louisiana, Maryland and Georgia.

== Results ==
1868 United States presidential election in Delaware
Party	Candidate	Running mate	Popular vote		Electoral vote	
Party	Candidate	Running mate	Count	%	Count	%
Democratic	Horatio Seymour of New York	Francis Preston Blair Jr. of Missouri	10,957	59.00%	3	100.00%
Republican	Ulysses S. Grant of Illinois	Schuyler Colfax of Indiana	7,614	41.00%	0	0.00%
Total			18,571	100.00%	3	100.00%

=== Results by county ===
County	Horatio Seymour Democratic		Ulysses S. Grant Republican		Margin		Total votes cast
County	#	%	#	%	#	%	Total votes cast
Kent	2,878	65.39%	1,523	34.61%	1,355	30.79%	4,401
New Castle	4,943	54.02%	4,208	45.98%	735	8.03%	9,151
Sussex	3,136	62.48%	1,883	37.52%	1,253	24.97%	5,019
Totals	10,957	59.00%	7,614	41.00%	3,343	18.00%	18,571

==== Counties that flipped from Republican to Democratic ====
- New Castle

== See also ==
- United States presidential elections in Delaware
