= 1832 United States presidential election in Delaware =

- November 2 – December 5, 1832
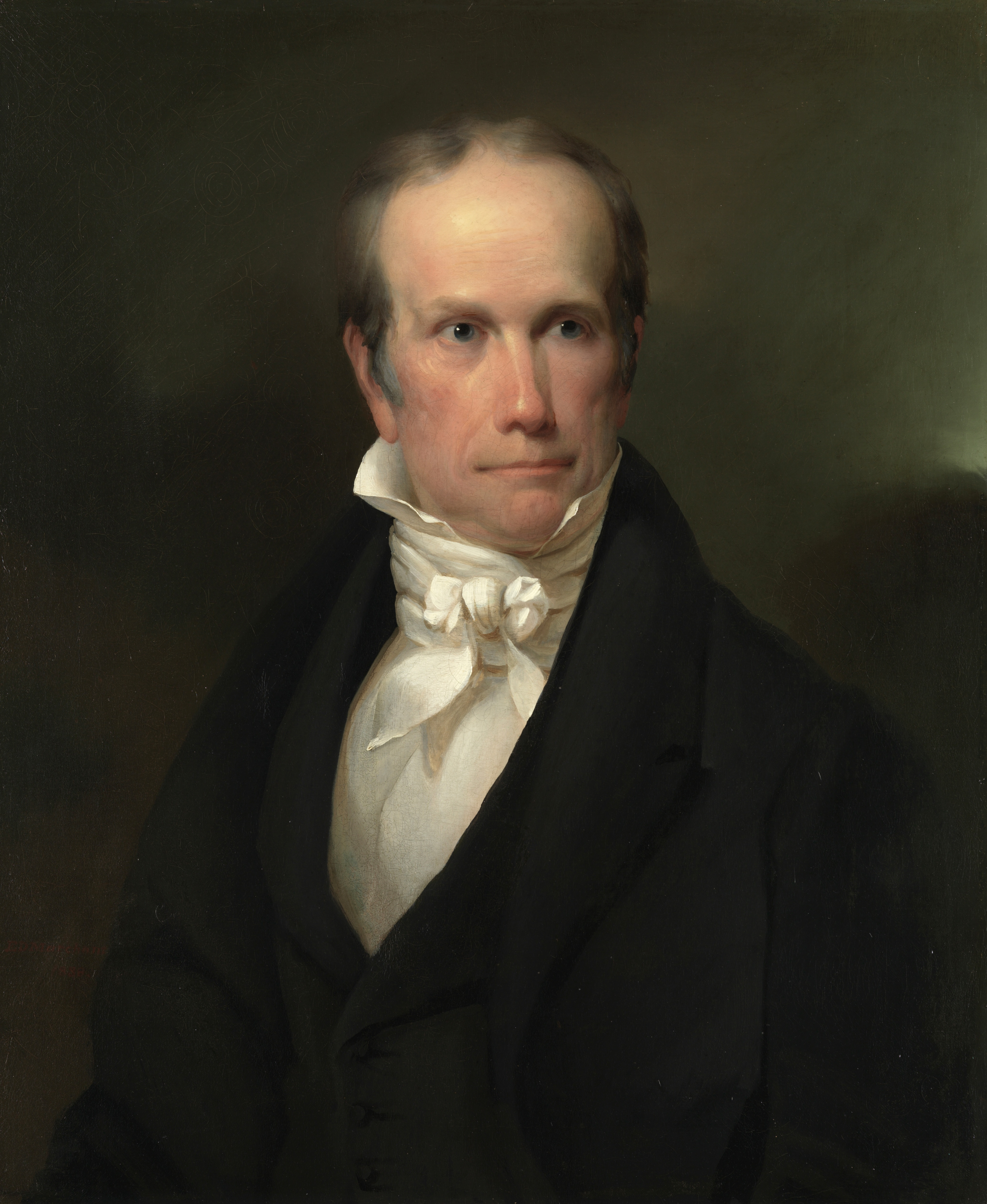

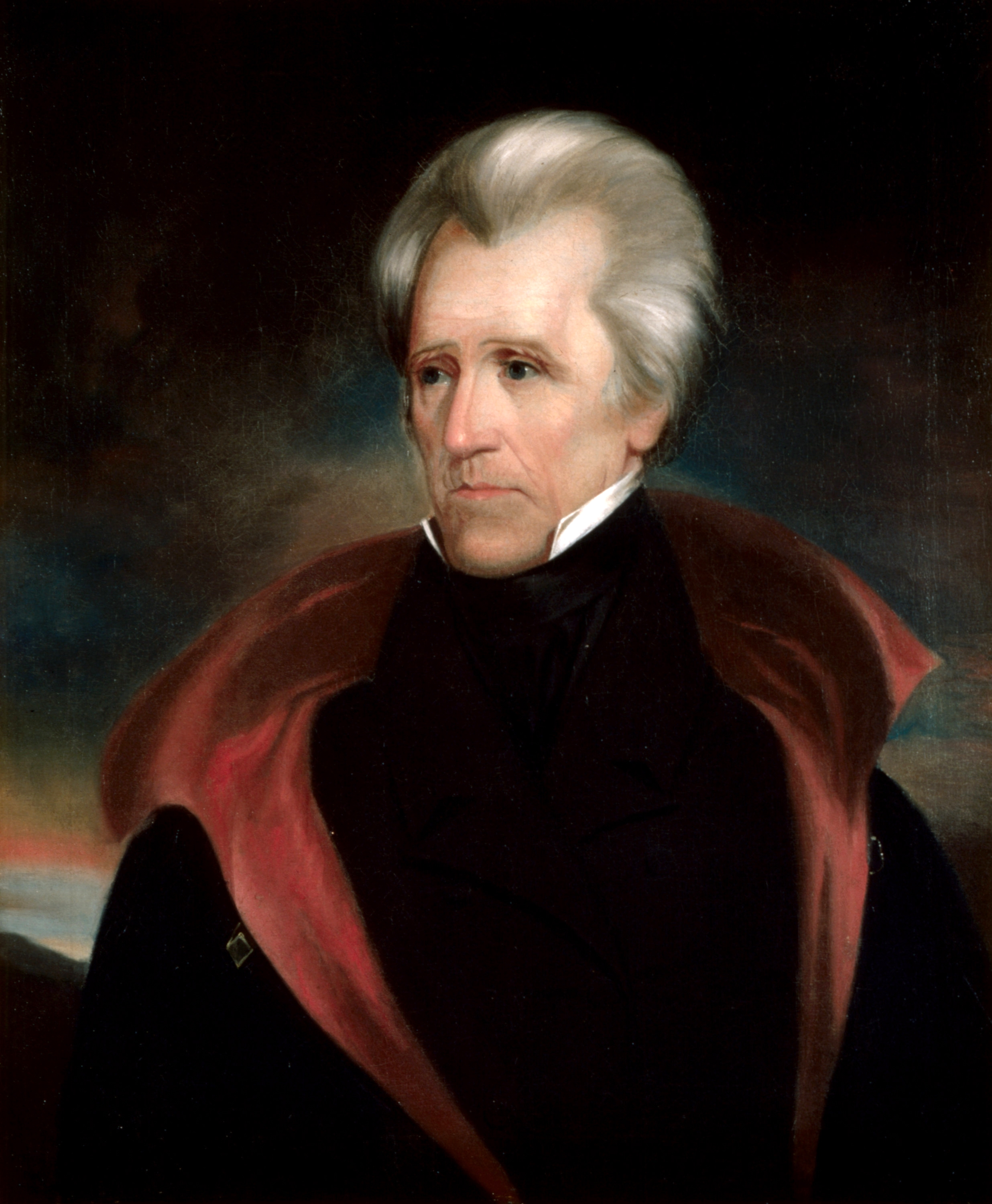
Nominee	Henry Clay	Andrew Jackson
Party	National Republican	Democratic
Home state	Kentucky	Tennessee
Running mate	John Sergeant	Martin Van Buren
Electoral vote	3	0
Popular vote	4,276	4,105
Percentage	51.02%	48.98%
County results
Clay
50–60%
Jackson
50–60%
President before election
Andrew Jackson
Democratic
Elected President
Andrew Jackson
Democratic

The 1832 United States presidential election in Delaware took place between November 2 and December 5, 1832, as part of the 1832 United States presidential election. Voters chose three representatives, or electors to the Electoral College, who voted for President and Vice President.

Delaware voted for the National Republican candidate, Henry Clay, over the Democratic Party candidate, Andrew Jackson. Clay won the state by a narrow margin of 2.04%. This was the first election in which Delaware voted by popular vote for president in a contested election. It had used the congressional district method in the uncontested election of 1788–89, but had since changed to selecting its electors through the state legislature from 1792 to 1828.

== Results ==
General Election Results
Party	Pledged to	Elector	Votes
National Republican Party	Henry Clay	Cornelius P. Comegys	4,276
National Republican Party	Henry Clay	George Truitt	4,263
National Republican Party	Henry Clay	Henry F. Hall	4,258
Democratic Party	Andrew Jackson	Nehemiah Clark	4,105
Democratic Party	Andrew Jackson	William N. Polk	4,098
Democratic Party	Andrew Jackson	Samuel Paynter	4,094
Votes cast (Note: Based on highest elector on each ticket)			8,381

=== Results by county ===
County	Henry Clay National Republican		Andrew Jackson Democratic		Margin		Total votes cast
County	#	%	#	%	#	%	Total votes cast
Kent	1,167	53.56%	1,012	46.44%	155	7.11%	2,179
New Castle	1,335	43.77%	1,715	56.23%	-380	-12.46%	3,050
Sussex	1,774	56.28%	1,378	43.72%	396	12.56%	3,152
Totals	4,276	51.02%	4,105	48.98%	171	2.04%	8,381

== See also ==
- United States presidential elections in Delaware
