= 1852 United States presidential election in Delaware =

- November 2, 1852

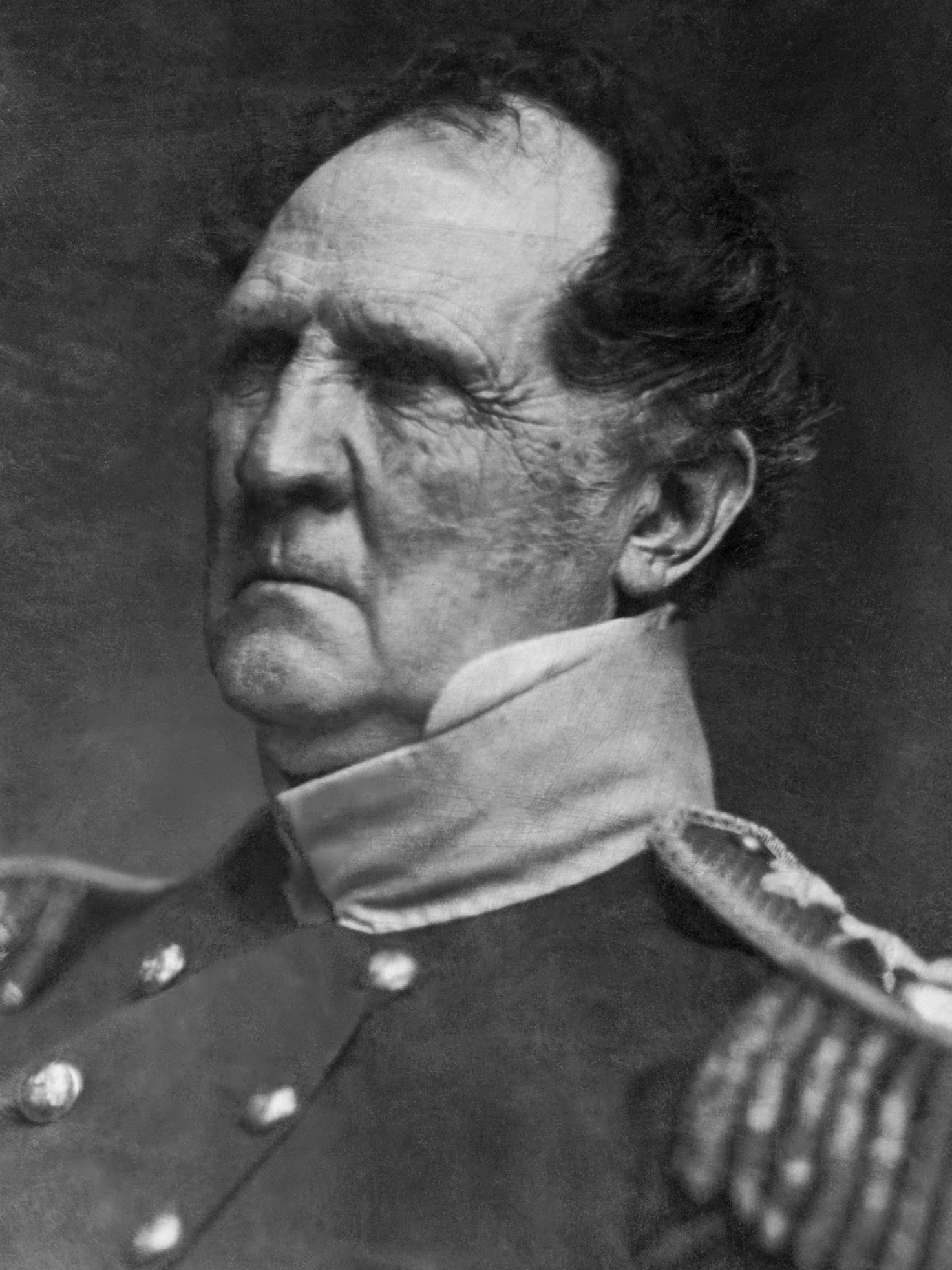
Nominee	Franklin Pierce	Winfield Scott
Party	Democratic	Whig
Home state	New Hampshire	New Jersey
Running mate	William R. King	William Alexander Graham
Electoral vote	3	0
Popular vote	6,318	6,293
Percentage	49.85%	49.66%
County results
Pierce
50–60%
Scott
50–60%
President before election
Millard Fillmore
Whig
Elected President
Franklin Pierce
Democratic

The 1852 United States presidential election in Delaware took place on November 2, 1852, as part of the 1852 United States presidential election. Voters chose three representatives, or electors to the Electoral College, who voted for President and Vice President.

Delaware voted for the Democratic candidate, Franklin Pierce, over Whig candidate Winfield Scott. The first Democrat to win Delaware in a presidential election, Pierce carried the state by a very narrow margin of 0.197%, only 25 votes.

== Results ==
1852 United States presidential election in Delaware (Note: These are the results as given by the 1853 Whig Almanac and cited by subsequent third party sources. Newspapers in 1852 gave the results as 6,319 for Pierce and 6,294 for Scott, which results in the same margin of victory for Pierce.)
Party	Candidate	Running mate	Popular vote		Electoral vote	
Party	Candidate	Running mate	Count	%	Count	%
Democratic	Franklin Pierce of New Hampshire	William R. King of Alabama	6,318	49.85%	3	100.00%
Whig	Winfield Scott of New Jersey	William Alexander Graham of North Carolina	6,293	49.66%	0	0.00%
Free Soil	John P. Hale of New Hampshire	George W. Julian of Indiana	62	0.49%	0	0.00%
Total			12,673	100.00%	3	100.00%

=== Results by county ===
County	Franklin Pierce Democratic		Winfield Scott Whig		John P. Hale Free Soil		Margin		Total votes cast
County	#	%	#	%	#	%	#	%	Total votes cast
Kent	1,422	47.20%	1,591	52.80%	0	0.00%	-169	-5.61%	3,013
New Castle	3,038	51.77%	2,768	47.17%	62	1.06%	270	4.60%	5,868
Sussex	1,858	49.00%	1,934	51.00%	0	0.00%	-76	-2.00%	3,792
Totals	6,318	49.85%	6,293	49.66%	62	0.49%	25	0.197%	12,673

==== Counties that flipped from Whig to Democratic ====
- New Castle

==== Counties that flipped from Democratic to Whig ====
- Sussex

== See also ==
- United States presidential elections in Delaware
