= 1980 United States presidential election in Delaware =

- November 4, 1980

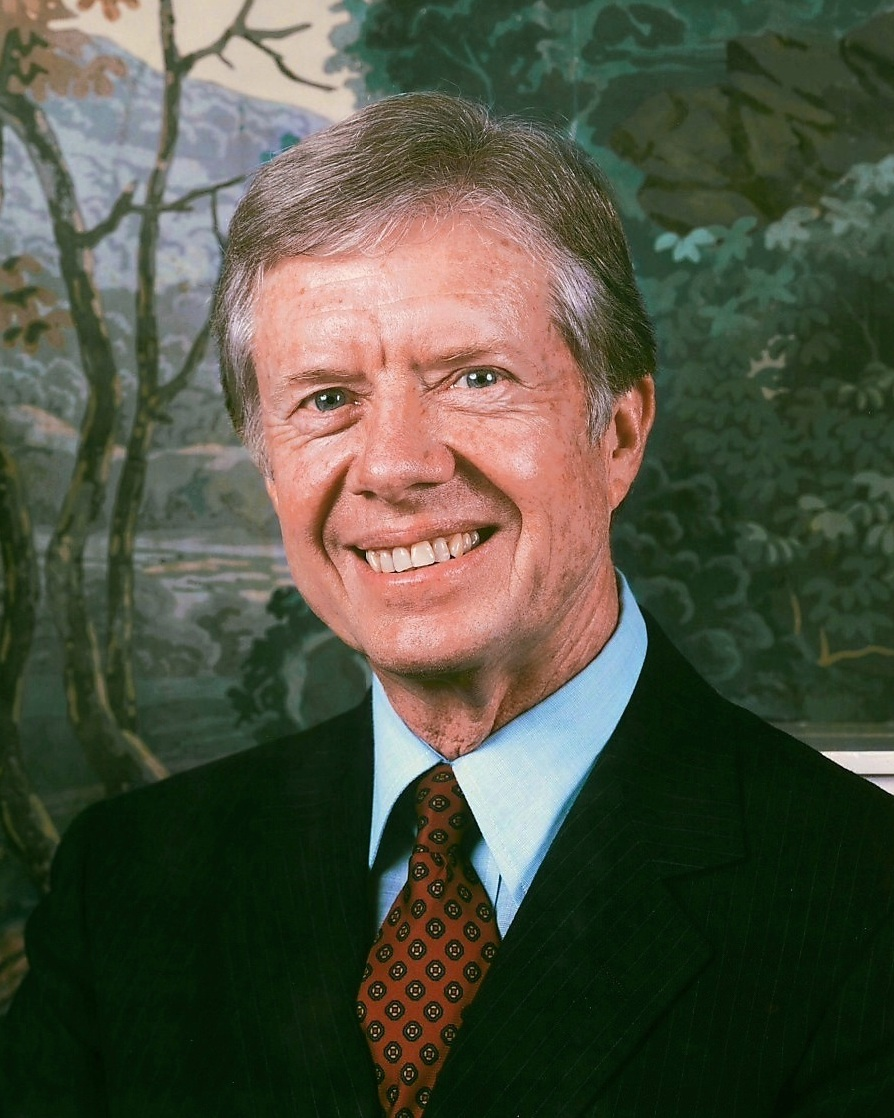

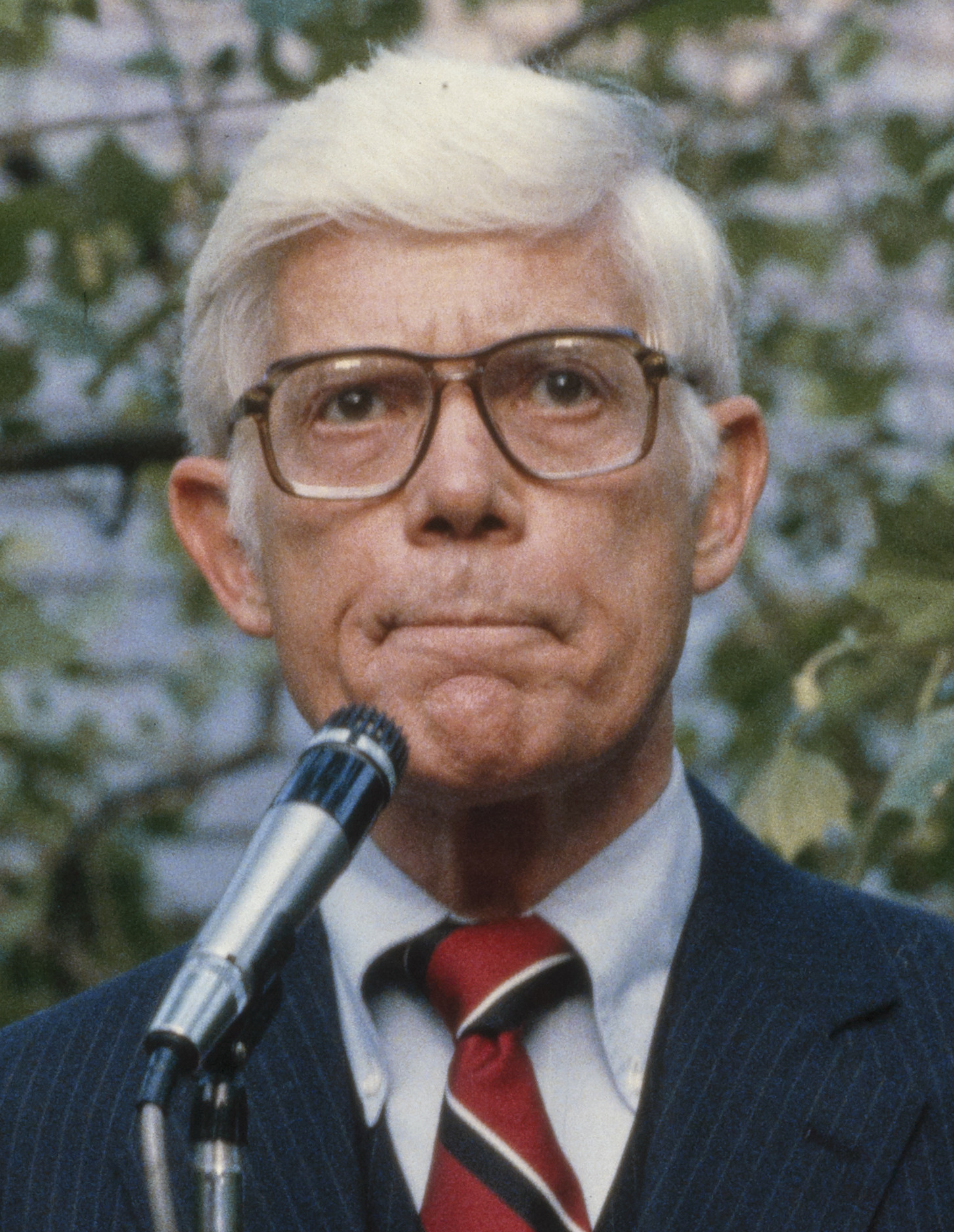
Nominee	Ronald Reagan	Jimmy Carter	John B. Anderson
Party	Republican	Democratic	Anderson Coalition (Note: Anderson’s party was listed on this state’s ballot as “Anderson Coalition”.)
Home state	California	Georgia	Illinois
Running mate	George H. W. Bush	Walter Mondale	Patrick Lucey
Electoral vote	3	0	0
Popular vote	111,252	105,754	16,288
Percentage	47.21%	44.87%	6.91%

Reagan
40–50%
50–60%
60–70%
Carter
40–50%
50–60%
60–70%
70–80%
80–90%
President before election
Jimmy Carter
Democratic
Elected President
Ronald Reagan
Republican

The 1980 United States presidential election in Delaware took place on November 4, 1980. All 50 states and The District of Columbia were part of the 1980 United States presidential election. State voters chose three electors to the Electoral College, who voted for president and vice president.

The election here was close, with Delaware being won by former California Governor Ronald Reagan by two points. Notably, Reagan won New Castle County by just one vote over Carter.

== Results ==
1980 United States presidential election in Delaware
Party	Candidate	Votes	%
Republican	Ronald Reagan	111,252	47.21%
Democratic	Jimmy Carter (inc.)	105,754	44.87%
Anderson Coalition	John B. Anderson	16,288	6.91%
Libertarian	Ed Clark	1,974	0.84%
American	Percy L. Greaves Jr.	400	0.17%
Total votes		235,668	100.00%

=== By county ===
County	Ronald Reagan Republican		Jimmy Carter Democratic		Various candidates Other parties		Margin		Total votes cast
County	#	%	#	%	#	%	#	%	Total votes cast
Kent	14,882	49.84%	12,884	43.15%	2,096	7.01%	1,998	6.69%	29,862
New Castle	76,898	45.66%	76,897	45.66%	14,632	8.68%	1	0.00%	168,427
Sussex	19,472	52.09%	15,973	42.73%	1,934	5.18%	3,499	9.36%	37,379
Totals	111,252	47.21%	105,754	44.87%	18,662	7.92%	5,498	2.34%	235,668

==== Counties that flipped from Democratic to Republican ====
- Kent
- New Castle
- Sussex

== See also ==
- United States presidential elections in Delaware
