= 1952 United States presidential election in Delaware =

- November 4, 1952

All 3 Delaware votes to the Electoral College

Nominee	Dwight D. Eisenhower	Adlai Stevenson
Party	Republican	Democratic
Home state	New York	Illinois
Running mate	Richard Nixon	John Sparkman
Electoral vote	3	0
Popular vote	90,059	83,315
Percentage	51.75%	47.88%
County results
Eisenhower
50–60%
President before election
Harry S. Truman
Democratic
Elected President
Dwight D. Eisenhower
Republican

The 1952 United States presidential election in Delaware took place on November 4, 1952, as part of the 1952 United States presidential election. State voters chose three representatives, or electors, to the Electoral College, who voted for president and vice president.

Delaware was won by Columbia University President Dwight D. Eisenhower (R–New York), running with Senator Richard Nixon, with 51.75% of the popular vote, against Adlai Stevenson (D–Illinois), running with Senator John Sparkman, with 47.88% of the popular vote.

Delaware's result for this election was exactly 7% more Democratic than the nation-at-large.

== Results ==
1952 United States presidential election in Delaware
Party	Candidate	Votes	%
Republican	Dwight D. Eisenhower	90,059	51.75%
Democratic	Adlai Stevenson	83,315	47.88%
Socialist Labor	Eric Hass	242	0.14%
Prohibition	Stuart Hamblen	234	0.13%
Progressive	Vincent Hallinan	155	0.09%
Socialist	Darlington Hoopes	20	0.01%
Total votes		174,025	100.00%

=== Results by county ===
County	Dwight D. Eisenhower Republican		Adlai Stevenson Democratic		All Others Various		Margin		Total votes cast
County	#	%	#	%	#	%	#	%	Total votes cast
Kent	10,144	50.45%	9,874	49.10%	90	0.45%	270	1.35%	20,108
New Castle	62,658	51.61%	58,387	48.10%	351	0.29%	4,271	3.51%	121,396
Sussex	17,257	53.06%	15,054	46.29%	210	0.65%	2,203	6.77%	32,521
Totals	90,059	51.75%	83,315	47.88%	651	0.37%	6,744	3.87%	174,025

==== Counties that flipped from Democratic to Republican ====
- New Castle

== See also ==
- United States presidential elections in Delaware
