= 1964 United States presidential election in Delaware =

- November 3, 1964

Nominee	Lyndon B. Johnson	Barry Goldwater
Party	Democratic	Republican
Home state	Texas	Arizona
Running mate	Hubert Humphrey	William E. Miller
Electoral vote	3	0
Popular vote	122,704	78,078
Percentage	60.95%	38.78%
County results
Johnson
50–60%
60–70%
President before election
Lyndon B. Johnson
Democratic
Elected President
Lyndon B. Johnson
Democratic

The 1964 United States presidential election in Delaware took place on November 3, 1964, as part of the 1964 United States presidential election. State voters chose three representatives, or electors, to the Electoral College, who voted for president and vice president.

All three counties went blue, and Delaware was won by incumbent President Lyndon B. Johnson of Texas, with 60.95% of the popular vote, against Senator Barry Goldwater of Arizona, with 38.78% of the popular vote.

== Results ==
1964 United States presidential election in Delaware
Party	Candidate	Votes	%
Democratic	Lyndon B. Johnson (inc.)	122,704	60.95%
Republican	Barry Goldwater	78,078	38.78%
Prohibition	E. Harold Munn	425	0.21%
Socialist Labor	Eric Hass	113	0.06%
Total votes		201,320	100.00%

=== Results by county ===
County	Lyndon B. Johnson Democratic		Barry Goldwater Republican		All Others Various		Margin		Total votes cast
County	#	%	#	%	#	%	#	%	Total votes cast
Kent	12,981	58.86%	9,006	40.84%	67	0.30%	3,975	18.02%	22,054
New Castle	91,752	62.46%	54,767	37.28%	374	0.26%	36,985	25.18%	146,893
Sussex	17,971	55.51%	14,305	44.19%	97	0.30%	3,666	11.32%	32,373
Totals	122,704	60.95%	78,078	38.78%	538	0.27%	44,626	22.17%	201,320

==== Counties that flipped from Republican to Democratic ====
- Sussex

== See also ==
- United States presidential elections in Delaware
