= 1844 United States presidential election in Delaware =

- November 12, 1844
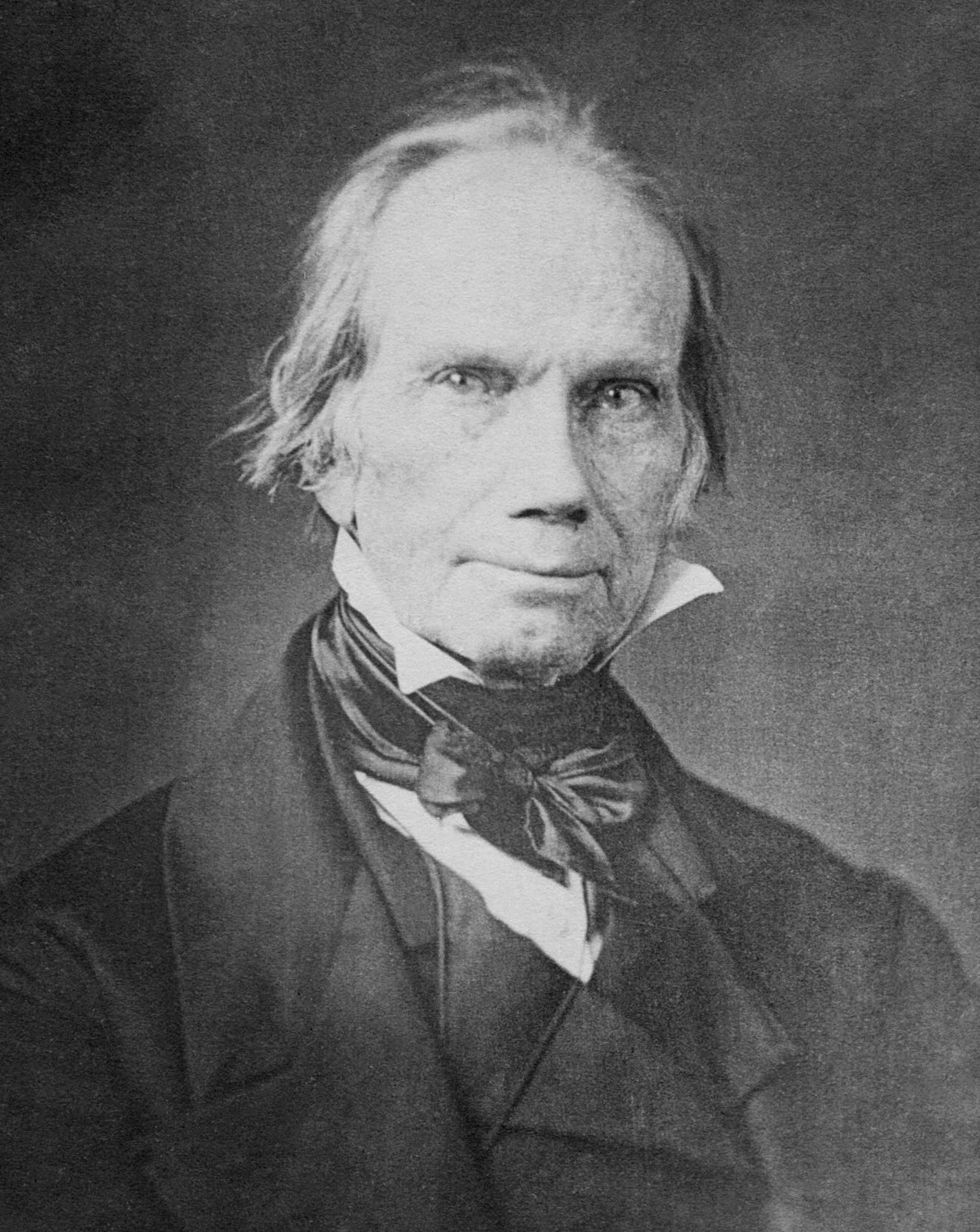

Nominee	Henry Clay	James K. Polk
Party	Whig	Democratic
Home state	Kentucky	Tennessee
Running mate	Theodore Frelinghuysen	George M. Dallas
Electoral vote	3	0
Popular vote	6,271	5,970
Percentage	51.20%	48.75%
County results
Clay
50–60%
Polk
50–60%
President before election
John Tyler
Independent
Elected President
James K. Polk
Democratic

The 1844 United States presidential election in Delaware was held on November 12, 1844 as part of the 1844 United States presidential election. Voters chose three representatives, or electors to the Electoral College, who voted for President and Vice President.

Delaware voted for the Whig candidate, Henry Clay, over Democratic candidate James K. Polk. Clay won the state by a narrow margin of 2.45%.

== Results ==
General Election Results
Party	Pledged to	Elector	Votes
Whig Party	Henry Clay	Enoch Spruance	6,271
Whig Party	Henry Clay	Alfred du Pont	6,261
Whig Party	Henry Clay	Thomas Davis	6,257
Democratic Party	James K. Polk	Stephen Green	5,970
Democratic Party	James K. Polk	Samuel B. Davis	5,965
Democratic Party	James K. Polk	Jacob Raymond	5,958
Write-in		Scattering	6
Votes cast (Note: Based on highest elector on each ticket)			12,247

=== Results by county ===
County	Henry Clay Whig		James K. Polk Democratic		Margin		Total votes cast
County	#	%	#	%	#	%	Total votes cast
Kent	1,583	52.80%	1,415	47.20%	168	5.60%	2,998
New Castle	2,819	51.23%	2,678	48.66%	141	2.56%	5,503 (Note: Includes the 6 Scattering votes)
Sussex	1,869	49.89%	1,877	50.11%	-8	-0.21%	3,746
Totals	6,270	51.20%	5,970	48.75%	301	2.46%	12,247

==== Counties that flipped from Whig to Democratic ====
- Sussex

== See also ==
- United States presidential elections in Delaware
