= 1856 United States presidential election in Delaware =

- November 4, 1856
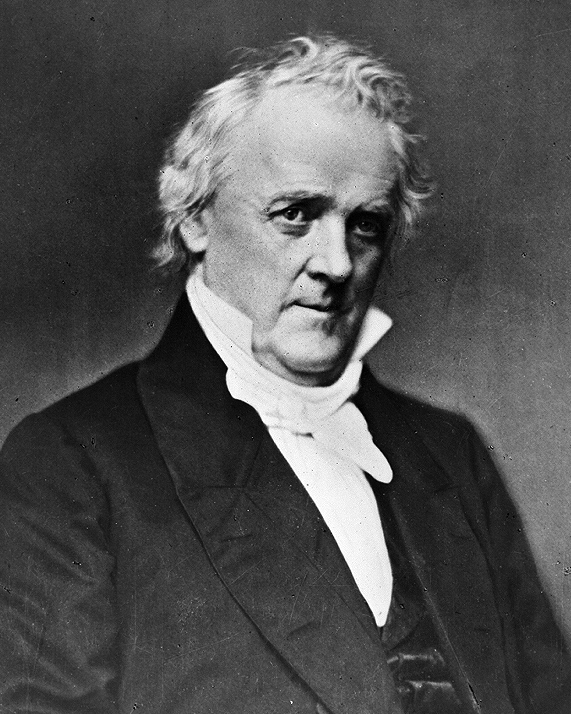

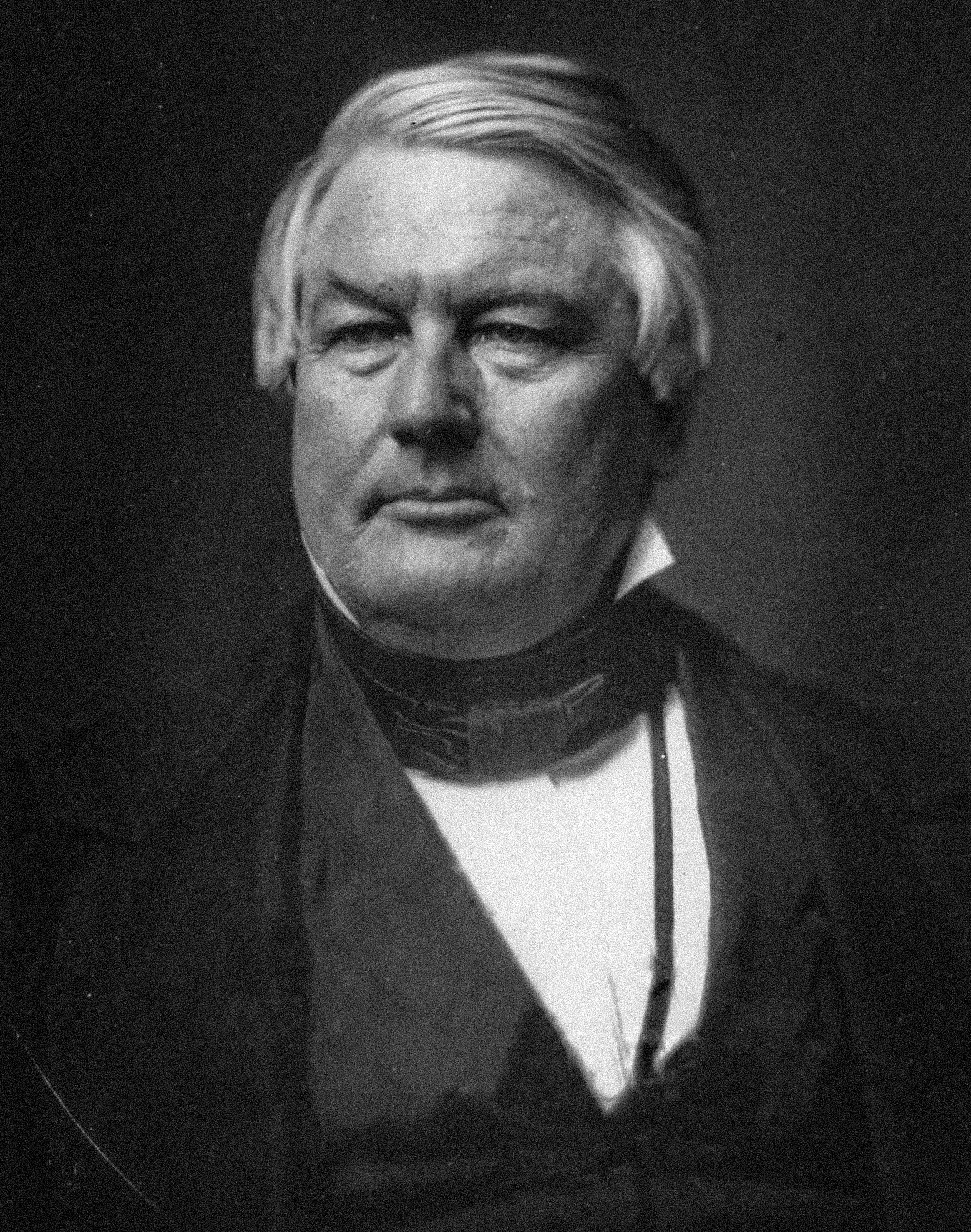
Nominee	James Buchanan	Millard Fillmore
Party	Democratic	Know Nothing
Home state	Pennsylvania	New York
Running mate	John C. Breckinridge	Andrew Jackson Donelson
Electoral vote	3	0
Popular vote	8,004	6,275
Percentage	54.83%	42.99%
County results
Buchanan
50–60%
President before election
Franklin Pierce
Democratic
Elected President
James Buchanan
Democratic

The 1856 United States presidential election in Delaware took place on November 4, 1856, as part of the 1856 United States presidential election. Voters chose three representatives, or electors to the Electoral College, who voted for president and vice president.

Delaware voted for the Democratic candidate, James Buchanan, over the Republican candidate, John C. Frémont, and the Know Nothing candidate, Millard Fillmore.

Buchanan won the state by a margin of 11.84%.

== Results ==
General Election Results
Party	Pledged to	Elector	Votes
Democratic Party	James Buchanan	Henry Ridgeley	8,004
Democratic Party	James Buchanan	George C. Gordon	8,003
Democratic Party	James Buchanan	Charles Wright	8,000
American Party	Millard Fillmore	James P. Wild	6,275
American Party	Millard Fillmore	John Whitby	6,274
American Party	Millard Fillmore	Mannen Gum	6,271
Republican Party	John C. Frémont	John R. Latimer	310
Republican Party	John C. Frémont	Thomas M. Rodney	306
Republican Party	John C. Frémont	William P. Nickerson	306
Write-in		Scattering	9
Votes cast (Note: Based on highest elector on each ticket)			14,598

=== Results by county ===
County	James Buchanan Democratic		Millard Fillmore Know Nothing		John C. Frémont Republican		Margin		Total votes cast
County	#	%	#	%	#	%	#	%	Total votes cast
Kent	2,083	57.61%	1,530	42.31%	3	0.08%	553	15.29%	3,616
New Castle	3,577	54.08%	2,725	41.20%	306	4.63%	852	12.88%	6,614 (Note: Includes 6 Scattering votes)
Sussex	2,344	53.66%	2,020	46.25%	1	0.02%	324	7.42%	4,368 (Note: Includes 3 Scattering votes)
Totals	8,004	54.83%	6,275	42.99%	310	2.12%	1,729	11.84%	14,598

==== Counties that flipped from Whig to Democratic ====
- Kent
- Sussex

== See also ==
- United States presidential elections in Delaware
