= 1940 United States presidential election in Delaware =

- November 5, 1940

All 3 Delaware votes to the Electoral College

| Nominee | Franklin D. Roosevelt | Wendell Willkie |
| Party | Democratic | Republican |
| Home state | New York | New York |
| Running mate | Henry A. Wallace | Charles L. McNary |
| Electoral vote | 3 | 0 |
| Popular vote | 74,599 | 61,440 |
| Percentage | 54.70% | 45.05% |
County results
Roosevelt
50–60%
President before election
Franklin D. Roosevelt
Democratic
Elected President
Franklin D. Roosevelt
Democratic

The 1940 United States presidential election in Delaware took place on November 5, 1940, as part of the 1940 United States presidential election. Delaware voters chose three representatives, or electors, to the Electoral College, who voted for president and vice president.

Delaware was won by incumbent President Franklin D. Roosevelt (D–New York), running with Secretary Henry A. Wallace, with 54.70% of the popular vote, against Wendell Willkie (R–New York), running with Minority Leader Charles L. McNary, with 45.05% of the popular vote.

== Results ==
1940 United States presidential election in Delaware
| Party | Candidate | Votes | % |
|---|---|---|---|
| Democratic | Franklin D. Roosevelt (inc.) | 74,599 | 54.70% |
| Republican | Wendell Willkie | 61,440 | 45.05% |
| Prohibition | Roger Babson | 220 | 0.16% |
| Socialist | Norman Thomas | 115 | 0.08% |
| Total votes | | 136,374 | 100.00% |

=== Results by county ===
| County | Franklin D. Roosevelt Democratic | | Wendell Willkie Republican | | Roger Babson Prohibition | | Norman Thomas Socialist | | Margin | | Total votes cast |
| County | # | % | # | % | # | % | # | % | # | % | Total votes cast |
|---|---|---|---|---|---|---|---|---|---|---|---|
| Kent | 9,226 | 53.17% | 8,079 | 46.56% | 42 | 0.24% | 6 | 0.03% | 1,147 | 6.61% | 17,353 |
| New Castle | 52,167 | 55.53% | 41,508 | 44.19% | 159 | 0.17% | 102 | 0.11% | 10,659 | 11.35% | 93,936 |
| Sussex | 13,206 | 52.65% | 11,853 | 47.25% | 19 | 0.08% | 7 | 0.03% | 1,353 | 5.39% | 25,085 |
| Totals | 74,599 | 54.70% | 61,440 | 45.05% | 220 | 0.16% | 115 | 0.08% | 13,159 | 9.65% | 136,374 |

== See also ==
- United States presidential elections in Delaware
