= New Castle County, Delaware =

County in Delaware, United States

- County of Delaware
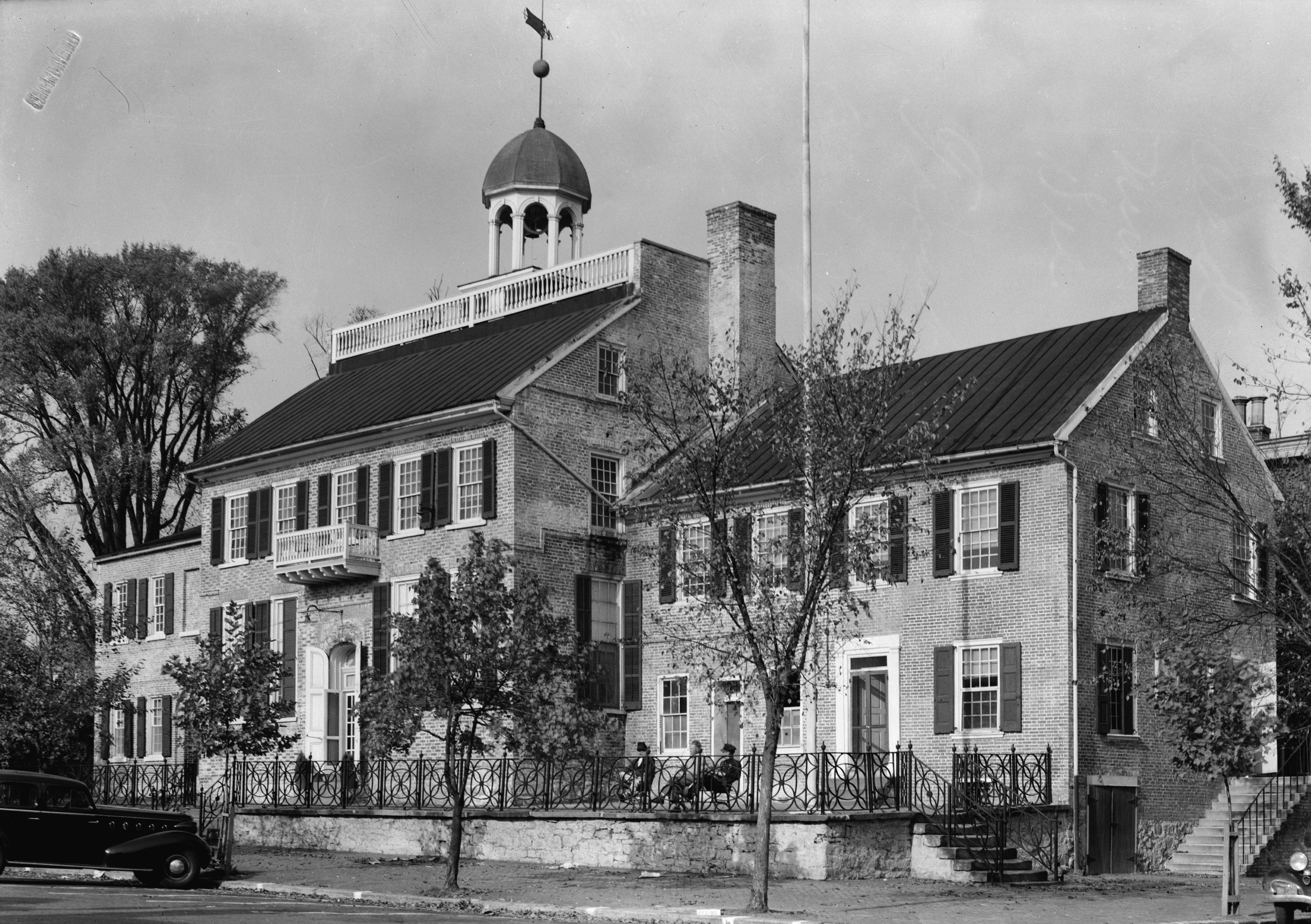
- Old New Castle Courthouse in New Castle (1936)

- Flag Seal

- Location within the U.S. state of Delaware
- Coordinates: 39°35′N 75°38′W
- Country: United States
- State: Delaware
- Founded: August 8, 1673
- Named for: William Cavendish, 1st Duke of Newcastle
- Seat: Wilmington
- Largest city: Wilmington

Area
  - Total: 494 sq mi (1,280 km^{2})
  - Land: 426 sq mi (1,100 km^{2})
  - Water: 68 sq mi (180 km^{2}) 13.8%

Population (2020)
  - Total: 570,719
  - Estimate (2025): 588,026 ▲
  - Density: 1,340/sq mi (517/km^{2})
- Time zone: UTC−5 (Eastern)
  - Summer (DST): UTC−4 (EDT)
- Congressional district: At-large
- Website: www.newcastlede.gov

New Castle County is the northernmost of the three counties of the U.S. state of Delaware (New Castle, Kent, and Sussex). As of the 2020 census, the population was 570,719, making it the most populous county in Delaware, with nearly 60% of the state's population of 989,948. The county seat is Wilmington, which is also the state's most populous city. New Castle County is included in the Philadelphia metropolitan area. The county is named after William Cavendish, 1st Duke of Newcastle (c. 1593–1676). New Castle County has the highest population and population density of any Delaware county, and it is the smallest county in the state by area. It has more people than the other two counties, Kent and Sussex, combined. It is also the most economically developed of the three.

== History ==
The first permanent European settlement on Delaware soil was Fort Christina, resulting from Peter Minuit's 1638 expedition on the Swedish vessels Fogel Grip and Kalmar Nyckel. The Swedes laid out the town at the site of modern-day Wilmington. They contracted with the Lenape Native Americans for land of Old Cape Henlopen north to Sankikans (Trenton Falls), and inland as far as they desired. However, a dispute ensued between the Swedes and the Dutch, who asserted a prior claim to that land.

In 1640, New Sweden was founded a few miles south of Christina. In 1644, Queen Christina appointed Lt. Col. Johan Printz as Governor of New Sweden. She directed boundaries to be set and to reach Cape Henlopen north along the west side of Godyn's Bay (Delaware Bay), up the South River (Delaware River), past Minquas Kill (Christina River), to Sankikans (Trenton Falls). Printz settled on Tinicum Island, as the seat of government and capital of the New Sweden colony.

Peter Stuyvesant, Governor of New Netherland, sailed up the South River in 1651. He purchased land from the Lenape that covered Minquas Kill to Bompties Hook (Bombay Hook); the Lenape had sold part of the property to the Swedes in 1638. Stuyvesant began to build Fort Casimir (contemporary New Castle).

In 1654, Johan Risingh, commissary and councilor to the governor Lt. Col. Printz, officially assumed Printz's duties and began to expel all Dutch from New Sweden. Fort Casimir surrendered and was renamed Fort Trinity in 1654. The Swedes had complete possession of the west side of the Delaware River. On June 21, 1654, the Lenape met with the Swedes to reaffirm the purchase.

Having learned of the fall of Fort Casimir, the Dutch sent Stuyvesant to drive the Swedes from both sides of the river. They allowed only Dutch colonists to settle in the area and on August 31, 1655, the territory was converted back to Fort Casimir. Consequently, Fort Christina fell on September 15 to the Dutch, was renamed Fort Altena and New Netherland ruled once again. John Paul Jacquet was immediately appointed governor, making New Amstel the capital of the Dutch-controlled colony.

The Dutch West India Company conveyed land from the south side of Christina Kill to Bombay Hook, and as far west as Minquas land. This land was known as the Colony of The city. On December 22, 1663, the Dutch transferred property rights to the territory along the Delaware River to England.

In 1664, the duke of York, James, was granted this land by King Charles II. One of the first acts by the Duke was to order removal of all Dutch from New Amsterdam; he renamed New Amstel as New Castle. In 1672, the town of New Castle was incorporated and English law ordered. However, in 1673, the Dutch attacked the territory, reclaiming it for their own.

On September 12, 1673, the Dutch established New Amstel in present-day Delaware, fairly coterminous with today's New Castle County. The establishment was not stable, and it was transferred to the British under the Treaty of Westminster on February 9, 1674. On November 6, 1674, New Amstel was made dependent on New York Colony, and was renamed New Castle on November 11, 1674.

On September 22, 1676, New Castle County was formally placed under the Duke of York's laws. It gained land from Upland County on November 12, 1678.

On June 21, 1680, St. Jones County was carved from New Castle County. It is known today as Kent County, Delaware. On August 24, 1682, New Castle County, along with the rest of the surrounding land, was transferred from the Colony of New York to the possession of William Penn, who established the Colony of Delaware.

In September 1673, a Dutch council established a court at New Castle with the boundaries defined as north of Steen Kill (present-day Stoney Creek) and south to Bomties Hook (renamed Bombay Hook). In 1681, a 12-mile arc was drawn to specifically delineate the northern border of New Castle County as it currently exists. In 1685, the western border was finally established by King James II; this was set as a line from Old Cape Henlopen (presently Fenwick) west to the middle of the peninsula and north up to the middle of the peninsula to the 40th parallel.

== Geography ==
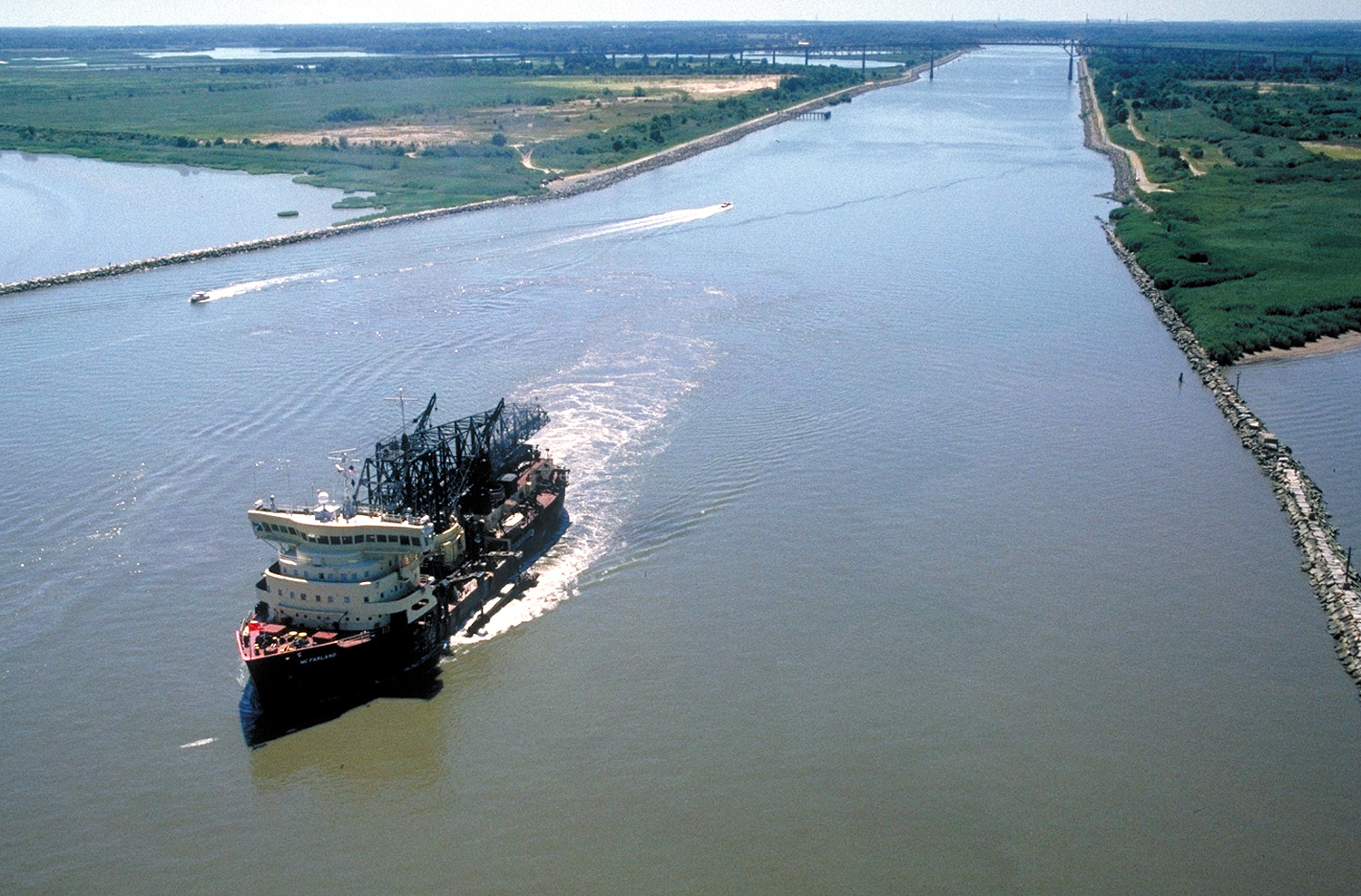
Chesapeake and Delaware Canal

According to the U.S. Census Bureau, the county has a total area of 494 square miles (1,280 km^{2}), of which 426 square miles (1,100 km^{2}) is land and 68 square miles (180 km^{2}) (13.8%) is water. The boundaries of New Castle County are described in § 102 of the Delaware Code. The county is drained by Brandywine Creek, Christina River, and other channels. Its eastern edge sits along the Delaware River and Delaware Bay.

Two small exclaves of the county and the state lie across the Delaware River, on its east bank on the New Jersey side, Finns Point adjacent to Pennsville Township, New Jersey, and the northern tip of Artificial Island, adjacent to Lower Alloways Creek Township, New Jersey.

New Castle County, like all of Delaware's counties, is subdivided into hundreds. New Castle County is apportioned into eleven hundreds: Brandywine, Christiana, Wilmington (the city of Wilmington, which, by law, is a hundred in itself), Mill Creek, White Clay Creek, Pencader, New Castle, Red Lion, St. Georges, Appoquinimink, and Blackbird.

Ebright Azimuth, the highest natural point in Delaware at 448 feet (137 m), is located in New Castle County.

The Chesapeake and Delaware Canal was built through New Castle County, and adjoining Cecil County, Maryland, between 1822 and 1829.

=== Adjacent counties ===
- Chester County, Pennsylvania – northwest
- Delaware County, Pennsylvania – north
- Gloucester County, New Jersey – northeast
- Salem County, New Jersey – east
- Kent County, Delaware – south
- Kent County, Maryland – southwest
- Cecil County, Maryland – west

=== Major roads and highways ===
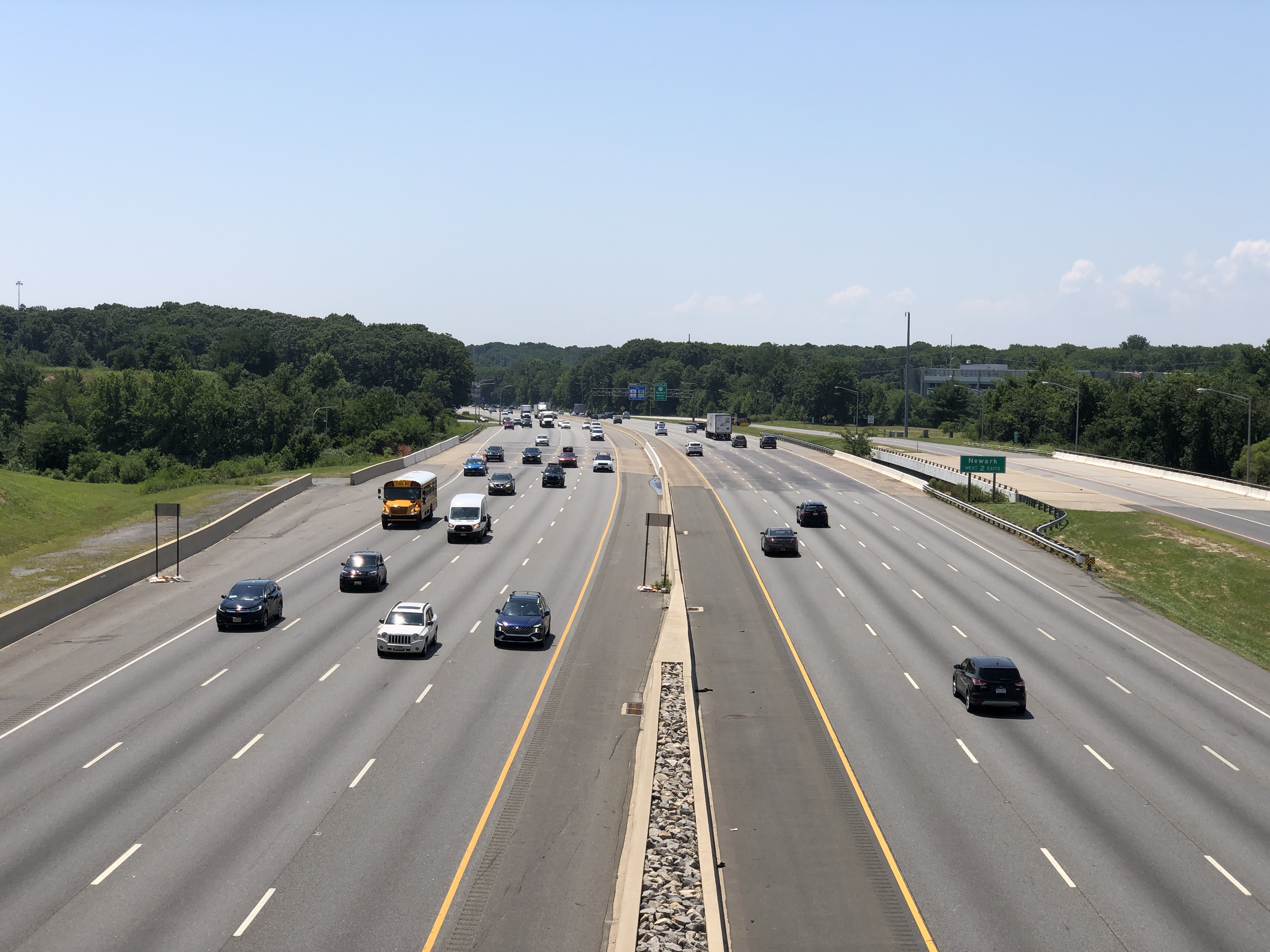
I-95/Delaware Turnpike southbound in New Castle County

- I-95 / Delaware Turnpike
- I-295
- I-495
- US 13
- US 13 Bus.
- US 40
- US 202
- US 301
- DE 1
- DE 2
- DE 3
- DE 4
- DE 7
- DE 9
- DE 9A
- DE 15
- DE 37
- DE 41
- DE 48
- DE 52
- DE 58
- DE 62
- DE 71
- DE 72
- DE 82
- DE 92
- DE 100
- DE 141
- DE 202
- DE 261
- DE 273
- DE 279
- DE 286
- DE 299
- DE 491
- DE 896

=== Climate ===
Almost all of the county has a humid subtropical climate (Cfa) except for the highest area around Ebright Azimuth where the climate is hot-summer humid continental (Dfa.) The hardiness zone is 7b except in some higher areas close to the Pennsylvania border which are 7a.

Climate data for Wilmington, Delaware (New Castle County Airport), 1981–2010 normals, extremes 1894–present
Month	Jan	Feb	Mar	Apr	May	Jun	Jul	Aug	Sep	Oct	Nov	Dec	Year
Record high °F (°C)	75 (24)	78 (26)	86 (30)	97 (36)	98 (37)	102 (39)	106 (41)	107 (42)	100 (38)	98 (37)	85 (29)	75 (24)	107 (42)
Mean maximum °F (°C)	61.2 (16.2)	63.1 (17.3)	73.7 (23.2)	82.6 (28.1)	88.3 (31.3)	93.2 (34.0)	96.0 (35.6)	93.7 (34.3)	89.1 (31.7)	81.6 (27.6)	72.5 (22.5)	63.9 (17.7)	96.9 (36.1)
Mean daily maximum °F (°C)	40.2 (4.6)	43.5 (6.4)	52.4 (11.3)	63.5 (17.5)	73.0 (22.8)	81.8 (27.7)	86.1 (30.1)	84.2 (29.0)	77.4 (25.2)	66.2 (19.0)	55.7 (13.2)	44.6 (7.0)	64.1 (17.8)
Mean daily minimum °F (°C)	24.6 (−4.1)	26.8 (−2.9)	33.6 (0.9)	43.0 (6.1)	52.6 (11.4)	62.6 (17.0)	67.6 (19.8)	66.1 (18.9)	58.2 (14.6)	46.1 (7.8)	37.4 (3.0)	28.7 (−1.8)	45.7 (7.6)
Mean minimum °F (°C)	7.4 (−13.7)	11.6 (−11.3)	17.9 (−7.8)	29.7 (−1.3)	38.7 (3.7)	49.9 (9.9)	56.7 (13.7)	54.3 (12.4)	43.7 (6.5)	32.8 (0.4)	23.3 (−4.8)	13.6 (−10.2)	4.3 (−15.4)
Record low °F (°C)	−14 (−26)	−15 (−26)	2 (−17)	11 (−12)	30 (−1)	40 (4)	48 (9)	43 (6)	32 (0)	23 (−5)	11 (−12)	−7 (−22)	−15 (−26)
Average precipitation inches (mm)	3.01 (76)	2.68 (68)	3.92 (100)	3.50 (89)	3.95 (100)	3.88 (99)	4.57 (116)	3.25 (83)	4.32 (110)	3.42 (87)	3.10 (79)	3.48 (88)	43.08 (1,094)
Average snowfall inches (cm)	5.9 (15)	8.3 (21)	1.9 (4.8)	0.3 (0.76)	0 (0)	0 (0)	0 (0)	0 (0)	0 (0)	0 (0)	0.4 (1.0)	3.4 (8.6)	20.2 (51)
Average precipitation days (≥ 0.01 in)	10.5	9.4	10.7	11.3	11.2	10.3	9.9	8.1	8.5	8.3	9.2	10.3	117.7
Average snowy days (≥ 0.1 in)	4.3	3.6	1.3	0.4	0	0	0	0	0	0	0.2	2.0	11.8
Source: NOAA

== Demographics ==
Historical population
Census	Pop.	Note	%±
1790	19,688		—
1800	25,361		28.8%
1810	24,429		−3.7%
1820	27,899		14.2%
1830	29,720		6.5%
1840	33,120		11.4%
1850	42,780		29.2%
1860	54,797		28.1%
1870	63,515		15.9%
1880	77,716		22.4%
1890	97,182		25.0%
1900	109,697		12.9%
1910	123,188		12.3%
1920	148,239		20.3%
1930	161,032		8.6%
1940	179,562		11.5%
1950	218,879		21.9%
1960	307,446		40.5%
1970	385,856		25.5%
1980	398,115		3.2%
1990	441,946		11.0%
2000	500,265		13.2%
2010	538,479		7.6%
2020	570,719		6.0%
2025 (est.)	588,026	▲	3.0%
U.S. Decennial Census; 1790-1960 1900-1990; 1990-2000 2010-2020

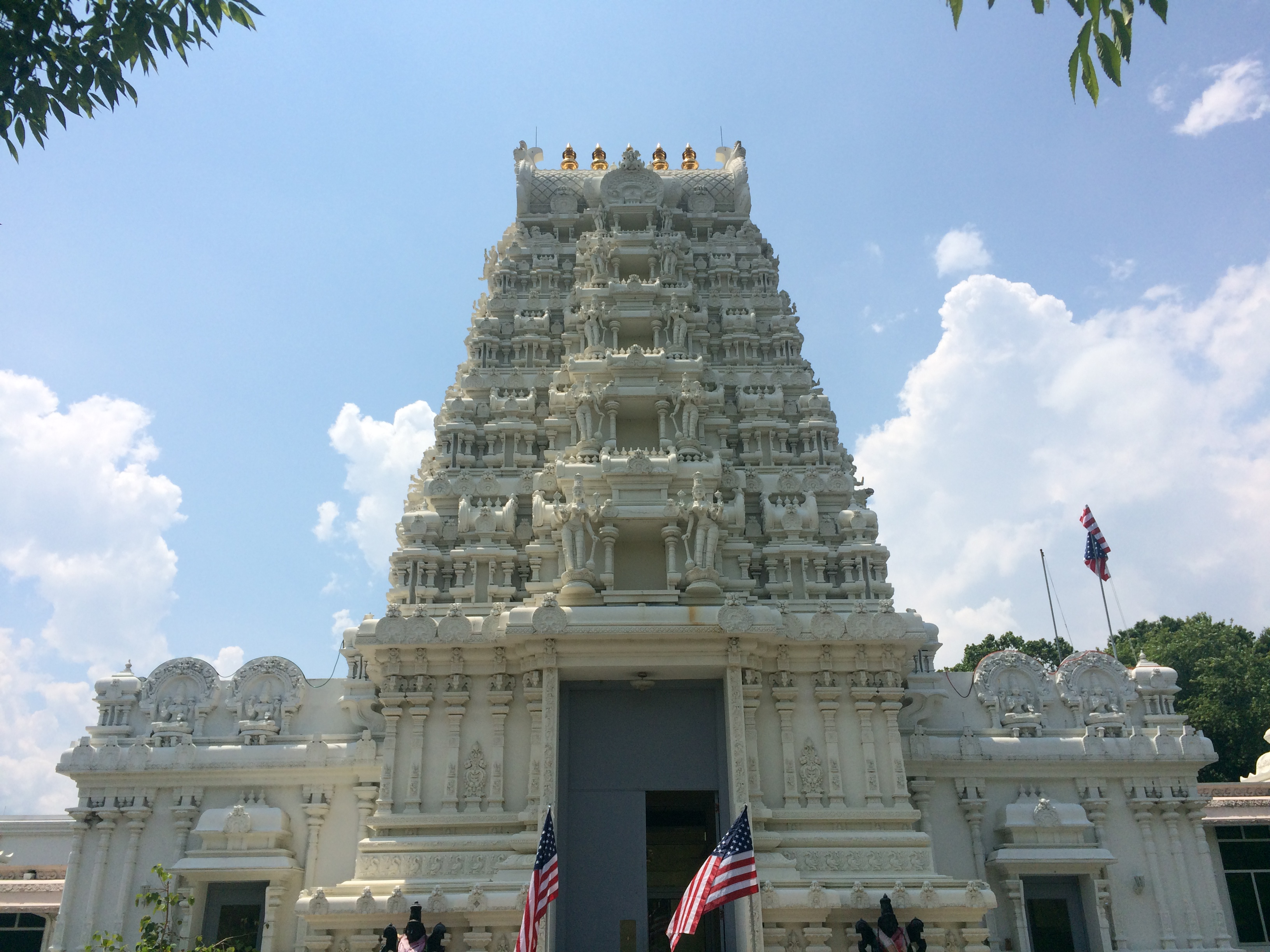
Hindu Temple of Delaware

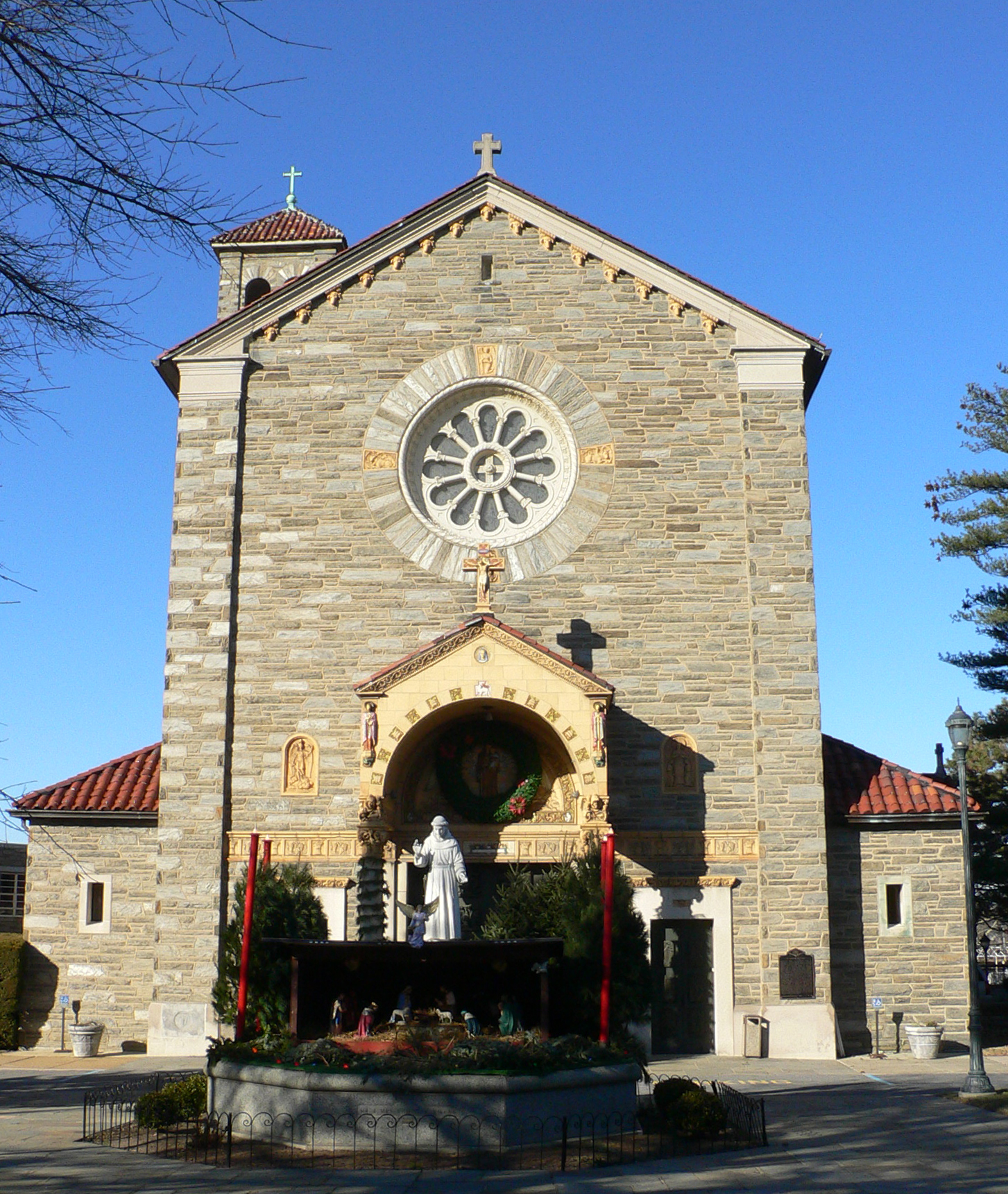
St. Anthony of Padua Roman Catholic Church

=== Racial and ethnic composition ===
New Castle County, Delaware – Racial and ethnic composition Note: the US Census treats Hispanic/Latino as an ethnic category. This table excludes Latinos from the racial categories and assigns them to a separate category. Hispanics/Latinos may be of any race.
Race / Ethnicity (NH = Non-Hispanic)	Pop 1970	Pop 1980	Pop 1990	Pop 2000	Pop 2010	Pop 2020	% 1970	% 1980	% 1990	% 2000	% 2010	% 2020
White alone (NH)	335,246	327,384	350,312	353,760	331,836	303,265	86.88%	82.23%	79.27%	70.71%	61.62%	53.14%
Black or African American alone (NH)	48,869	59,492	71,895	99,648	124,426	142,388	12.67%	14.94%	16.27%	19.92%	23.11%	24.95%
Native American or Alaska Native alone (NH)	201	433	701	806	984	893	0.05%	0.11%	0.16%	0.16%	0.18%	0.16%
Asian alone (NH)	947	2,867	6,932	12,856	23,132	35,022	0.25%	0.72%	1.57%	2.57%	4.30%	6.14%
Native Hawaiian or Pacific Islander alone (NH)	x	x	x	139	102	127	x	x	x	0.03%	0.02%	0.02%
Other race alone (NH)	593	831	302	631	873	2,555	0.15%	0.21%	0.07%	0.13%	0.16%	0.45%
Mixed race or Multiracial (NH)	x	x	x	6,132	10,205	22,953	x	x	x	1.23%	1.90%	4.02%
Hispanic or Latino (any race)	x	7,108	11,804	26,293	46,921	63,516	x	1.79%	2.67%	5.26%	8.71%	11.13%
Total	385,856	398,115	441,946	500,265	538,479	570,719	100.00%	100.00%	100.00%	100.00%	100.00%	100.00%

=== 2020 census ===
As of the 2020 census, the county had a population of 570,719. Of the residents, 21.2% were under the age of 18 and 16.4% were 65 years of age or older; the median age was 39.0 years. For every 100 females there were 92.8 males, and for every 100 females age 18 and over there were 90.2 males. 93.9% of residents lived in urban areas and 6.1% lived in rural areas.

The racial makeup of the county was 55.1% White, 25.7% Black or African American, 0.4% American Indian and Alaska Native, 6.2% Asian, 5.0% from some other race, and 7.7% from two or more races. Hispanic or Latino residents of any race comprised 11.1% of the population.

The racial and ethnic makeup (where Latinos are treated as if a separate racial group) shows that the county was 53.1% non-Hispanic white, 25.0% non-Hispanic African American, 0.2% non-Hispanic Native American, 6.1% non-Hispanic Asian, 0.02% non-Hispanic Pacific Islander, 4.0% non-Hispanic multiracial, and 11.1% Hispanic or Latino of any race. The most reported ancestries were:

- Irish (17.2%)
- African American (15.6%)
- English (12.8%)
- German (12.8%)
- Italian (10.2%)
- Polish (4.7%)
- Mexican (4.4%)
- Puerto Rican (3.6%)
- Indian (3%)
- Scottish (2.7%)

There were 219,571 households in the county, of which 30.7% had children under the age of 18 living with them and 30.5% had a female householder with no spouse or partner present. About 27.5% of all households were made up of individuals and 10.8% had someone living alone who was 65 years of age or older.

There were 233,747 housing units, of which 6.1% were vacant. Among occupied housing units, 66.7% were owner-occupied and 33.3% were renter-occupied. The homeowner vacancy rate was 1.1% and the rental vacancy rate was 6.6%.

=== 2010 census ===
As of the 2010 census, there were 538,479 people, 202,651 households, and 134,743 families residing in the county. The population density was 1,263.2 inhabitants per square mile (487.7/km^{2}). There were 217,511 housing units at an average density of 510.2 per square mile (197.0/km^{2}). The racial makeup of the county was 65.5% white, 23.7% black or African American, 4.3% Asian, 0.3% American Indian, 3.5% from other races, and 2.5% from two or more races. Those of Hispanic or Latino origin made up 8.7% of the population. In terms of ancestry, 19.2% were Irish, 15.0% were German, 11.7% were Italian, 11.3% were English, 6.2% were Polish, and 3.0% were American.

Of the 202,651 households, 33.8% had children under the age of 18 living with them, 46.6% were married couples living together, 14.9% had a female householder with no husband present, 33.5% were non-families, and 26.1% of all households were made up of individuals. The average household size was 2.57 and the average family size was 3.11. The median age was 37.2 years.

The median income for a household in the county was $62,474 and the median income for a family was $78,072. Males had a median income of $52,637 versus $41,693 for females. The per capita income for the county was $31,220. About 6.6% of families and 10.3% of the population were below the poverty line, including 13.6% of those under age 18 and 7.6% of those age 65 or over.

=== 2000 census ===
As of the census of 2000, there were 500,265 people, 188,935 households, and 127,153 families residing in the county. The population density was 1,174 inhabitants per square mile (453/km^{2}). There were 199,521 housing units at an average density of 468 per square mile (181/km^{2}). The racial makeup of the county was 73.12% White, 20.22% Black or African American, 0.20% Native American, 2.59% Asian, 0.03% Pacific Islander, 2.22% from other races, and 1.62% from two or more races. 5.26% of the population were Hispanic or Latino of any race. 14.6% were of Irish, 11.4% Italian, 10.9% German, 8.8% English and 5.4% Polish ancestry. 89.5% spoke English and 5.3% Spanish as their first language.

There were 188,935 households, out of which 32.50% had children under the age of 18 living with them, 49.60% were married couples living together, 13.40% had a female householder with no husband present, and 32.70% were non-families. 25.70% of all households were made up of individuals, and 8.50% had someone living alone who was 65 years of age or older. The average household size was 2.56 and the average family size was 3.09.

In the county, the population was spread out, with 24.90% under the age of 18, 10.30% from 18 to 24, 31.50% from 25 to 44, 21.70% from 45 to 64, and 11.60% who were 65 years of age or older. The median age was 35 years. For every 100 females there were 94.40 males. For every 100 females age 18 and over, there were 90.80 males.

The median income for a household in the county was $52,419, and the median income for a family was $62,144. Males had a median income of $42,541 versus $31,829 for females. The per capita income for the county was $25,413. 8.40% of the population and 5.60% of families were below the poverty line. Out of the total population, 10.20% of those under the age of 18 and 7.40% of those 65 and older were living below the poverty line.

== Government ==
=== County government ===
==== County executive ====
The county is headed by a county executive, currently Marcus Henry. The chief administrative officer, who is the county's second-in-command, is appointed by the county executive and serves at his or her pleasure. Mona Parikh was appointed CAO in January 2025.

==== County offices ====
The New Castle County government maintains the New Castle County Government Center in an unincorporated area; it has a New Castle postal address. The facility opened in May 1997 after it acquired the facility from Wilmington Trust. Previously these county offices were at the Louis L. Redding City/County Building, with some others in the County Engineering Building. The latter building is no longer in use. By 1998 the majority of the county employees were based at the Government Center.

The Redding Building was built in 1976. The city/county council chambers are at Redding.

==== County Council ====
The county's legislative body is a thirteen-member county council, consisting of twelve members elected by district and one president elected at large. The council is tasked with drafting laws and managing county government services, public health ordinances, land use, transportation, and zoning. New Castle County Council doubled in size to thirteen from seven members in 2004. Its most famous council member was Joe Biden, the 46th president of the United States, who represented the 4th district from 1971 to 1973.

Current county council members are:

- District 1: Brandon Toole (D)
- District 2: Dee Durham (D)
- District 3: Janet Kilpatrick (D)
- District 4: Penrose Hollins (D)
- District 5: Valerie George (D)
- District 6: David Carter (D)
- District 7: George Smiley (D)
- District 8: John J. Cartier (D)
- District 9: Timothy P. Sheldon (D)
- District 10: Jea P. Street (D)
- District 11: David L. Tackett (D)
- District 12: Kevin Caneco (D)
- At Large: Karen Hartley-Nagle (D), President

==== County judiciary ====
As with Delaware's other two counties, New Castle County has no judiciary of its own. All judicial functions, except for Alderman's Courts, are managed and funded by the state of Delaware. In New Castle County, only the cities of Newport and Newark have alderman's courts. These courts have jurisdiction over driving offenses, misdemeanor criminal charges, and minor civil claims.

==== County row offices ====
The county retains the concept of "row offices" from Pennsylvania, so-called because all of these county offices could be found in a row in smaller courthouses. In Delaware, these offices are clerk of the peace, recorder of deeds, register of wills, and sheriff.

The office of clerk of the peace is unique among the 50 states; the office-holder's function is almost exclusively to perform marriages. The current incumbent is Kenneth W. Boulden Jr. (D)

The recorder of deeds is Michael Kozikowski (D). His office is responsible for receiving and recording deeds, mortgages and satisfactions thereof, assignments, commissions of judges, notaries, and military officers. The recorder of deeds' office is heavily computerized; electronic images of all recent documents and many others are available the office is in the process of imaging further back with the eventual goal of all documents in the office's possession being available electronically. Computerized indexing and searching is also available.

The register of wills is Ciro Poppiti, III. His office receives and records wills and small-estate affidavits upon an individual's death, and issues letters of administration to estate executors.

The sheriff of New Castle County has two divisions, criminal and civil. The criminal division is based in the New Castle County Courthouse in Wilmington. The deputies assigned to this division organize and manage capias returns. They also transport prisoners for Superior Court, Court of Common Pleas, and Family Court. The civil division serves legal process, performs levies & impounds and sells property in satisfaction of judgments. The civil division also locates and apprehends individuals wanted for civil capias. The current sheriff is Scott T. Phillips.

==== County zoning and public works ====
New Castle County has a strong zoning code, known as the Unified Development Code, or UDC. The UDC was developed by the Gordon Administration in response to public perception of over- and misdevelopment in the county. New building projects must go through a process of application and approval before construction is permitted to begin.

By operation of state law, New Castle County has no responsibility whatsoever for maintenance of roadways. Public roadways are maintained exclusively by the Delaware Department of Transportation, while roadways within neighborhoods and developments are, pursuant to County code, maintained by homeowners' or neighborhood associations.

The Department of Public Works maintains essential infrastructure elements such as sanitary sewers and drainage ways. It also maintains County-owned parks and buildings such as County libraries. It does not maintain the water distribution system, which is owned and operated by several private companies. In general, it also does not maintain stormwater management facilities within subdivisions.

==== County public safety ====
Access to 911 emergency services is provided by New Castle County through their emergency communications center for all fire/rescue/emergency medical services (EMS) throughout the county and the majority of police services, though Newark, Wilmington, and the University of Delaware maintain their own police emergency call centers. New Castle County has its own nationally accredited police department. The New Castle County Police Department is the second largest police organization in the state of Delaware. New Castle County maintains a county wide police force with authorization to enforce laws throughout the county, including within incorporated municipalities. The county police force is supported by local municipality police agencies in Middletown, Newark, Delaware City, Wilmington, Newport, Elsmere, the city of New Castle, the University of Delaware, as well as the Delaware State Police.

New Castle County also operates a nationally accredited, county-run paramedic service through its Emergency Medical Services Division. NCC*EMS is the advanced life support (ALS) component of a two-tiered, paramedic intercept EMS system. County paramedics are located in eight full-time stations and one part-time station that operates during the hours of 7:00 a.m. to 7:00 p.m., with a capability of calling in additional personnel during major emergencies or planned events. Basic life support (BLS) ambulance service is provided primarily by volunteer fire companies with the use of paid employees that are trained in fire suppression and EMS. Fire/Rescue protection is provided by twenty-one volunteer fire departments throughout the county. The city of Wilmington has its own career municipal fire department and contracts with a private ambulance service for basic life support coverage. The contracted private ambulance service in Wilmington operates in a tiered response configuration with the New Castle County Paramedics.

The Paul J. Sweeney Public Safety Building, located in Minquadale off of US 13, houses the New Castle County Police and Emergency Medical Services Division Headquarters and the emergency communications center supporting 9-1-1 services. The present building opened in 2007 with a construction cost of US$50,000,000. The Headquarters occupied a former elementary school building on the same site prior to erection of the current building.

=== Federal government ===
New Castle is a strongly Democratic county. Because its population is almost double the combined population of Kent and Sussex, the winner in New Castle County has also won Delaware overall in each of the last eighteen presidential elections. In 1992, 2000, 2004 and 2016, the Republican candidate carried Kent and Sussex, only to lose New Castle by double digits–enough of a margin to swing the entire state to the Democrats. New Castle was a bellwether from 1936 to 1996, as it backed the national winner in every presidential election. It became the longest-running national bellwether after 1996, when Okanogan County, Washington, voted for Bob Dole. In 2000, Valencia County, New Mexico became the longest presidential bellwether.

Former governor Ronald Reagan won the county by just one vote over President Jimmy Carter in 1980. The county was won by the Republican presidential candidate from 1980 through 1988. This changed when Bill Clinton won the county in 1992 and, like many urban counties, New Castle stayed Democratic ever since.

The county warmly supported former senator and Wilmington resident Joe Biden as Barack Obama's running mate in 2008 and 2012, and during his own bid for president in 2020, each time with well over 65 percent of the vote–more than enough to carry Delaware.

United States presidential election results for New Castle County, Delaware
Year	Republican		Democratic		Third party(ies)	
Year	No.	%	No.	%	No.	%
1832	1,335	43.77%	1,715	56.23%	0	0.00%
1836	1,673	47.91%	1,814	51.95%	5	0.14%
1840	2,321	51.28%	2,195	48.50%	10	0.22%
1844	2,819	51.23%	2,678	48.66%	6	0.11%
1848	3,091	52.50%	2,717	46.14%	80	1.36%
1852	2,768	47.17%	3,038	51.77%	62	1.06%
1856	306	4.62%	3,577	54.03%	2,737	41.34%
1860	2,073	35.77%	719	12.41%	3,004	51.83%
1864	4,274	52.85%	3,813	47.15%	0	0.00%
1868	4,208	45.98%	4,943	54.02%	0	0.00%
1872	5,844	55.36%	4,564	43.23%	149	1.41%
1876	6,054	47.79%	6,613	52.21%	0	0.00%
1880	7,724	50.19%	7,623	49.53%	43	0.28%
1884	7,809	47.54%	8,554	52.07%	64	0.39%
1888	6,130	41.46%	8,463	57.24%	192	1.30%
1892	10,383	48.69%	10,583	49.63%	358	1.68%
1896	12,344	53.70%	9,632	41.90%	1,011	4.40%
1900	13,646	55.38%	10,644	43.20%	350	1.42%
1904	13,198	53.00%	11,170	44.85%	536	2.15%
1908	14,987	52.31%	12,965	45.25%	701	2.45%
1912	8,340	28.38%	13,009	44.27%	8,035	27.34%
1916	16,666	51.32%	14,894	45.86%	916	2.82%
1920	36,600	58.29%	24,252	38.62%	1,939	3.09%
1924	35,427	61.24%	17,842	30.84%	4,582	7.92%
1928	47,641	67.66%	22,464	31.90%	307	0.44%
1932	39,844	53.76%	32,872	44.36%	1,393	1.88%
1936	37,851	44.13%	47,315	55.17%	600	0.70%
1940	41,508	44.31%	52,167	55.69%	0	0.00%
1944	37,783	43.09%	49,588	56.55%	318	0.36%
1948	47,451	48.92%	48,117	49.60%	1,433	1.48%
1952	62,658	51.61%	58,387	48.10%	351	0.29%
1956	71,133	55.65%	56,405	44.13%	275	0.22%
1960	69,284	48.46%	73,364	51.31%	326	0.23%
1964	54,767	37.28%	91,752	62.46%	374	0.25%
1968	70,014	44.76%	68,468	43.77%	17,931	11.46%
1972	100,681	58.21%	70,190	40.58%	2,085	1.21%
1976	80,074	47.01%	87,521	51.38%	2,743	1.61%
1980	76,898	45.66%	76,897	45.66%	14,632	8.69%
1984	102,322	57.14%	76,238	42.57%	517	0.29%
1988	92,587	53.52%	79,147	45.75%	1,269	0.73%
1992	66,311	33.69%	91,516	46.50%	38,990	19.81%
1996	60,943	33.94%	98,837	55.05%	19,766	11.01%
2000	78,587	36.88%	127,539	59.86%	6,934	3.25%
2004	93,079	38.54%	146,179	60.52%	2,269	0.94%
2008	74,608	29.07%	178,768	69.66%	3,245	1.26%
2012	81,230	32.23%	167,082	66.30%	3,700	1.47%
2016	85,525	32.52%	162,919	61.95%	14,535	5.53%
2020	88,364	30.72%	195,034	67.81%	4,235	1.47%
2024	90,868	32.82%	180,700	65.27%	5,291	1.91%

United States Senate election results for New Castle County, Delaware1
Year	Republican		Democratic		Third party(ies)	
Year	No.	%	No.	%	No.	%
2024	82,475	30.55%	176,195	65.26%	11,335	4.20%
2018	59,526	28.30%	145,428	69.15%	5,369	2.55%
2012	56,666	23.34%	177,244	72.99%	8,926	3.68%

United States Senate election results for New Castle County, Delaware2
Year	Republican		Democratic		Third party(ies)	
Year	No.	%	No.	%	No.	%
2020	80,081	28.66%	191,774	68.62%	7,607	2.72%
2014	45,229	33.97%	84,985	63.82%	2,948	2.21%
2010	57,649	31.57%	123,678	67.73%	1,271	0.70%

=== State government ===
Gubernatorial elections results

Gubernatorial elections results
Year	Republican	Democratic	Third parties
2024	35.7% 95,746	64.3% 172,412	0.0% 0
2020	29.48% 82,545	68.45% 191,678	2.07% 5,816
2016	31.05% 77,839	66.21% 165,973	2.75% 6,879
2012	22.1% 53,510	75.93% 183,858	1.97% 4,871

The Delaware Department of Services for Children, Youth, and Their Families (DSCYF) has its headquarters in the Delaware Youth and Family Center (DYFC), located in unincorporated New Castle County, near Wilmington. Several DSCYF juvenile facilities, including the New Castle County Detention Center (NCCDC), the Ferris School for Boys, and the Grace and Snowden Cottages are in unincorporated New Castle County.

Several Delaware Department of Correction facilities are located in the county. The James T. Vaughn Correctional Center (JTVCC), formerly the Delaware Correctional Center, is a men's prison in unincorporated New Castle County, housing sentenced prisoners; Vaughn opened in 1971. The Howard R. Young Correctional Institution, renamed from Multi-Purpose Criminal Justice Facility in 2004 and housing both pretrial and posttrial male prisoners, is located in Wilmington; it opened in 1982. The Delores J. Baylor Correctional Institution, a women's prison housing pretrial and posttrial prisoners, is located in unincorporated New Castle County. Baylor opened on December 29, 1991. The Delaware male death row was in the JTVCC, while the female death row was in Baylor. Executions were to occur at JTVCC, prior to the 2016 suspension of it by the Delaware Supreme Court.

New Castle elects a substantial majority of the state legislature, with 27 state house districts and 17 state senate districts based in the county.

== Communities ==
New Castle County is home to two minor league sports teams: the Wilmington Blue Rocks (baseball) and the Delaware Blue Coats (basketball), both of which play in Wilmington. It also has a professional auto racing track in New Castle known as Airport Speedway, with races on Saturday nights throughout the summer.

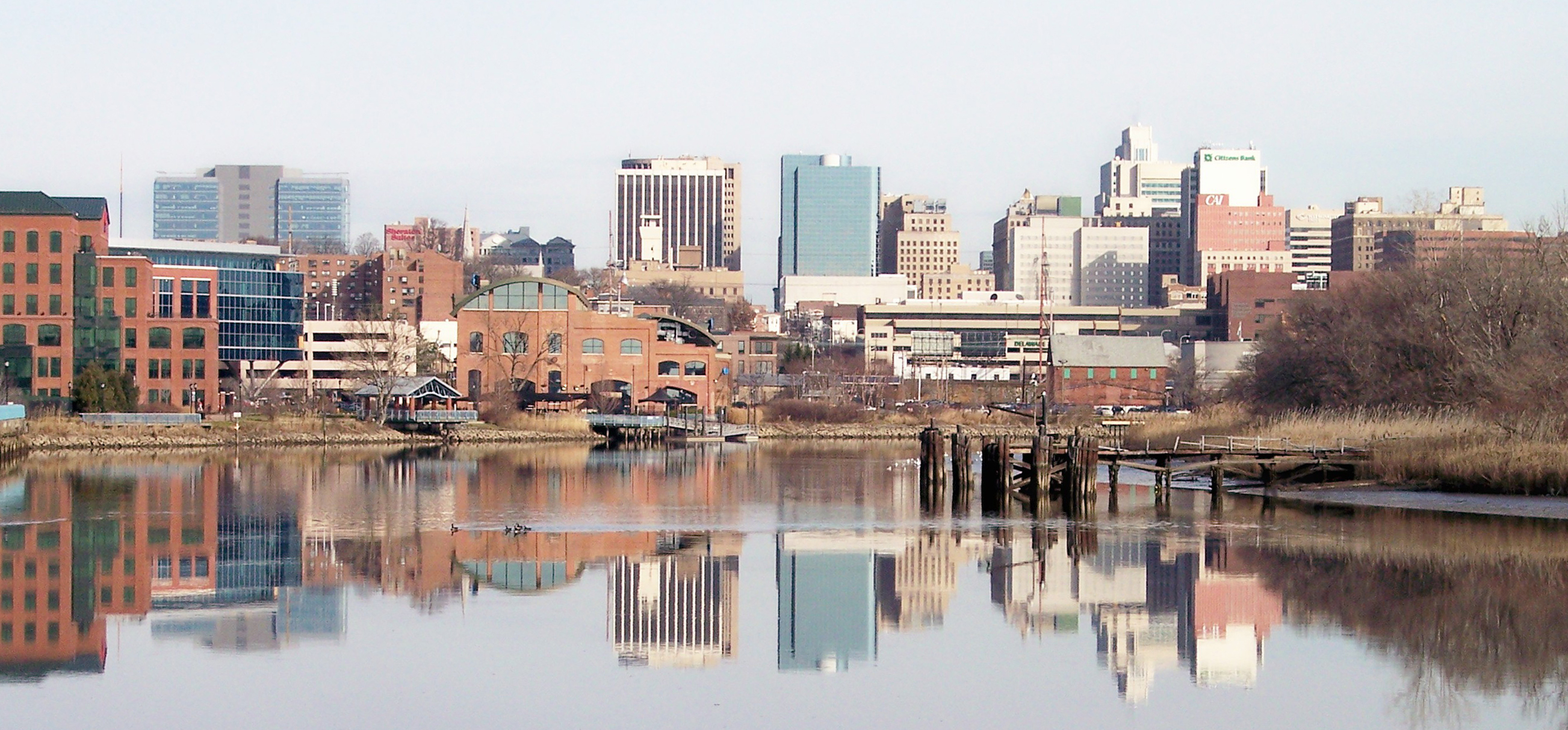
Wilmington

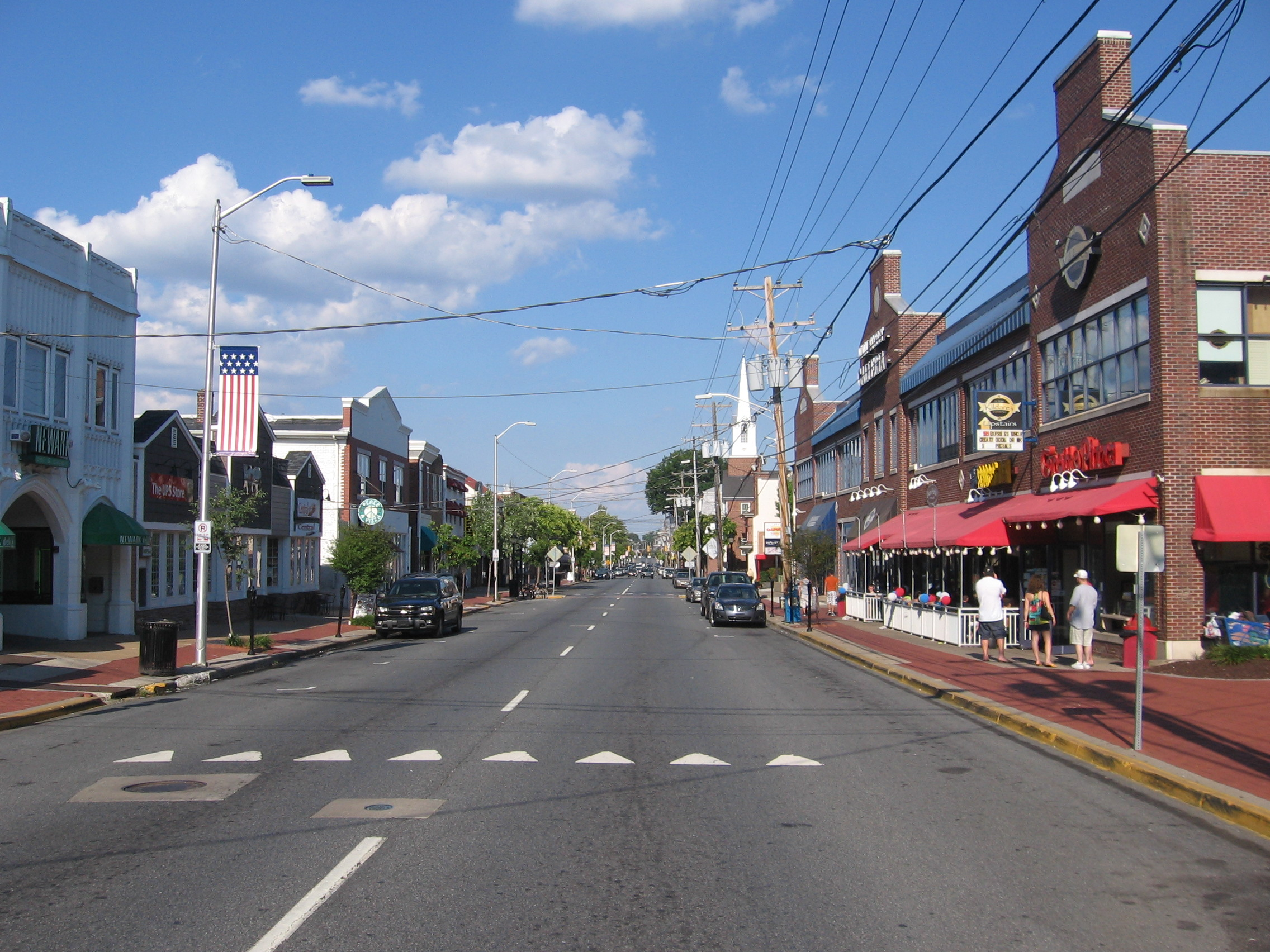
Newark

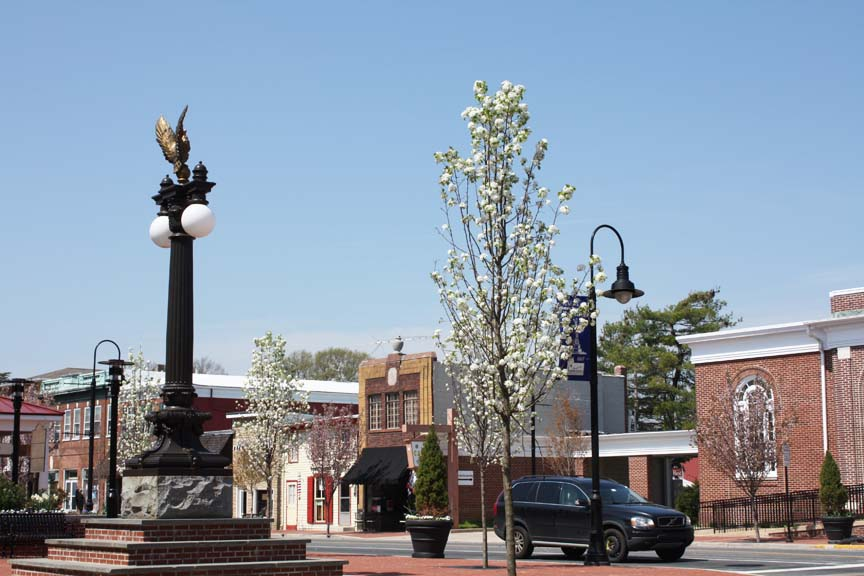
Middletown

=== Cities ===
- Delaware City
- New Castle
- Newark
- Wilmington

=== Towns ===
- Bellefonte
- Clayton (partly in Kent County)
- Elsmere
- Middletown
- Newport
- Odessa
- Smyrna (partly in Kent County)
- Townsend

=== Villages ===
- Arden
- Ardencroft
- Ardentown

=== Census-designated places ===
- Bear
- Brookside
- Claymont
- Edgemoor
- Glasgow
- Greenville
- Hockessin
- North Star
- Pike Creek
- Pike Creek Valley
- St. Georges
- Wilmington Manor

=== Unincorporated communities ===
- Appoquinimink Hundred
- Alapocas
- Centerville
- Christiana
- Collins Park
- Granogue
- Holly Oak
- Marshallton
- Mill Creek
- Minquadale
- Montchanin
- Mount Pleasant
- Ogletown
- Port Penn
- Rockland
- Stanton
- Talleyville
- Wooddale

=== Ghost towns ===
- Glenville

== Education ==
=== K-12 education ===
School districts

- Appoquinimink School District
- Brandywine School District
- Christina School District
- Colonial School District
- Red Clay Consolidated School District
- Smyrna School District

County-wide overlay district: New Castle County Vocational-Technical School District

In the period of de jure educational segregation in the United States, K-12 students of black African descent attended segregated schools. Middletown School District 120 operated Louis L. Redding Comprehensive High School for New Castle County to house high school students of black African descent during the period 1953 to 1966. Desegregation occurred after 1966. Redding was the black school for the Middletown area. Wilmington's segregated black high school was Howard High School.

In 1978 the Alexis I. DuPont School District, Alfred I. DuPont School District, Claymont School District, Conrad School District, De Le Warr School District, Marshallton-McKean School District, Mount Pleasant School District, New Castle-Gunning Bedford School District, Newark School District, Stanton School District, and Wilmington School District all merged to form the New Castle County School District. In 1981 that district was divided into the Christina, Colonial, Red Clay, and Brandywine districts.

State-owned schools

- Delaware School for the Deaf

Charter schools

- Charter School of Wilmington
- Delaware Military Academy
- MOT Charter School
- Newark Charter School

Closed:

- Pencader Charter HS

Private schools

In 2010, 18.8% of the county students enrolled in K-12 schools were in private institutions.

- Archmere Academy
- Delaware Valley Classical School
- Centreville Layton School
- Padua Academy
- Red Lion Christian Academy
- St. Andrew's School
- St. Anne's Episcopal School
- St. Elizabeth High School
- St. Mark's High School
- Salesianum School
- Sanford School
- Tatnall School
- Tower Hill School
- Ursuline Academy
- Wilmington Christian School
- Wilmington Friends School
- Wilmington Montessori School

Closed private schools:

- St. Mary's

=== Tertiary ===
- Delaware State University – Wilmington Campus
- Delaware Technical & Community College – Wilmington Campus
- Goldey-Beacom College
- University of Delaware – Main Campus, Wilmington Campus and Downtown Building
- Wilmington University – Wilmington Campus
- Widener University Delaware Law School

Closed:

- Delaware College of Art & Design

=== Libraries ===
New Castle County Library has the following branches:

- Appoquinimink Community Library
- Bear Library
- Brandywine Hundred Library
- Claymont Library
- Elsmere Library
- Hockessin Library
- Kirkwood Library
- Newark Library
- Route 9 Library & Innovation Center
- Woodlawn Library

The Wilmington Library has two locations: Wilmington Branch and North Wilmington Branch.

Other municipal libraries include:

- Corbit-Calloway Memorial Library in Odessa
- Delaware City Library
- New Castle Library

Former county libraries:

- Concord Pike - Began operations in 1959, and replaced in 2003 by the Brandywine Hundred Library.

== See also ==
- National Register of Historic Places listings in New Castle County, Delaware
- Morris Branch (Corks Point Ditch tributary)
- Hindu Temple of Delaware
