= 1932 United States presidential election in Connecticut =

- November 8, 1932
- Turnout: 88.96% (▼1.82%)

| Nominee | Herbert Hoover | Franklin D. Roosevelt |
| Party | Republican | Democratic |
| Home state | California | New York |
| Running mate | Charles Curtis | John Nance Garner |
| Electoral vote | 8 | 0 |
| Popular vote | 288,420 | 281,632 |
| Percentage | 48.54% | 47.40% |

Hoover
40–50%
50–60%
60–70%
70–80%
80–90%
Roosevelt
40–50%
50–60%
60–70%
70–80%
President before election
Herbert Hoover
Republican
Elected President
Franklin D. Roosevelt
Democratic

The 1932 United States presidential election in Connecticut took place on November 8, 1932, as part of the 1932 United States presidential election which was held throughout all contemporary 48 states. Voters chose eight representatives, or electors to the Electoral College, who voted for president and vice president.

Connecticut voted for the Republican nominee, incumbent President Herbert Hoover of California, over the Democratic nominee, Governor Franklin D. Roosevelt of New York. Hoover's running mate was incumbent Vice President Charles Curtis of Kansas, while Roosevelt ran with incumbent Speaker of the House John Nance Garner of Texas.

Hoover won Connecticut by a very narrow margin of 1.14%. Connecticut was one of only six states (the other five being Delaware, Maine, New Hampshire, Pennsylvania and Vermont), four of them in New England, which voted to re-elect the embattled Republican incumbent Hoover, who was widely unpopular over his failure to adequately address the Great Depression.

Despite the massive nationwide shift towards Democrats, Hoover managed to flip the town of Marlborough, which voted for Democrats Al Smith in 1928 and John W. Davis in 1924, both of whom lost by landslide margins. Marlborough was the only town in Connecticut and one of only a few places in the nation to flip from Democratic to Republican in 1932.

== Results ==
1932 United States presidential election in Connecticut
| Party | Candidate | Running mate | Popular vote | | Electoral vote | |
| Party | Candidate | Running mate | Count | % | Count | % |
|---|---|---|---|---|---|---|
| Republican | Herbert Hoover of California (incumbent) | Charles Curtis of Kansas (incumbent) | 288,420 | 48.54% | 8 | 100.00% |
| Democratic | Franklin Delano Roosevelt of New York | John Nance Garner of Texas | 281,632 | 47.40% | 0 | 0.00% |
| Socialist | Norman Thomas of New York | James Hudson Maurer of Pennsylvania | 20,480 | 3.45% | 0 | 0.00% |
| Socialist Labor | Verne L. Reynolds of New York | John W. Aiken of Massachusetts | 2,287 | 0.38% | 0 | 0.00% |
| Communist | William Z. Foster of Massachusetts | James W. Ford of Alabama | 1,364 | 0.23% | 0 | 0.00% |
| Total | | | 594,183 | 100.00% | 8 | 100.00% |

=== By county ===
1932 United States presidential election in Connecticut (by county)
| County | Hoover % | Hoover # | Roosevelt % | Roosevelt # | Others % | Others # | Margin % | Margin # | Total # |
|---|---|---|---|---|---|---|---|---|---|
| Fairfield | 49.9% | 72,238 | 44.5% | 64,367 | 5.6% | 8,092 | 5.4% | 7,871 | 144,697 |
| Hartford | 48.4% | 72,611 | 48.2% | 72,322 | 3.5% | 5,220 | 0.2% | 289 | 150,153 |
| Litchfield | 56.9% | 18,682 | 41.1% | 13,469 | 2.0% | 660 | 15.8% | 5,213 | 32,811 |
| Middlesex | 52.8% | 10,770 | 45.5% | 9,286 | 1.7% | 344 | 7.3% | 1,484 | 20,400 |
| New Haven | 45.4% | 79,019 | 49.9% | 86,826 | 4.8% | 8,296 | -4.5% | -7,807 | 174,141 |
| New London | 49.1% | 19,721 | 48.8% | 19,576 | 2.1% | 858 | 0.3% | 145 | 40,155 |
| Tolland | 51.8% | 5,857 | 44.1% | 4,985 | 4.0% | 455 | 7.7% | 872 | 11,297 |
| Windham | 46.4% | 9,522 | 52.6% | 10,801 | 1.0% | 206 | -6.2% | -1,279 | 20,529 |

==== Counties that flipped from Republican to Democratic ====
- Windham

== See also ==
- United States presidential elections in Connecticut
