= 1872 United States presidential election in Delaware =

- November 5, 1872
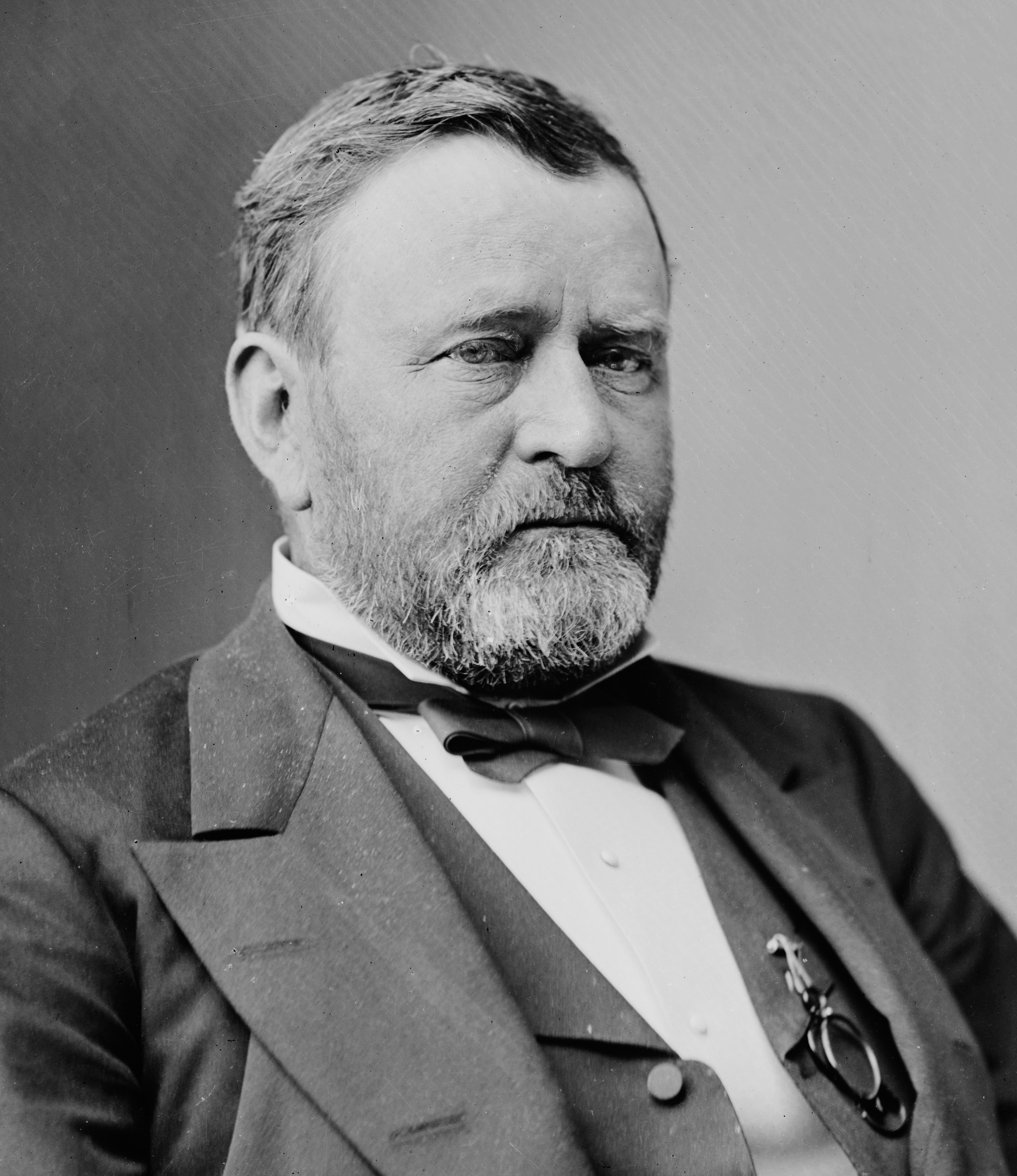

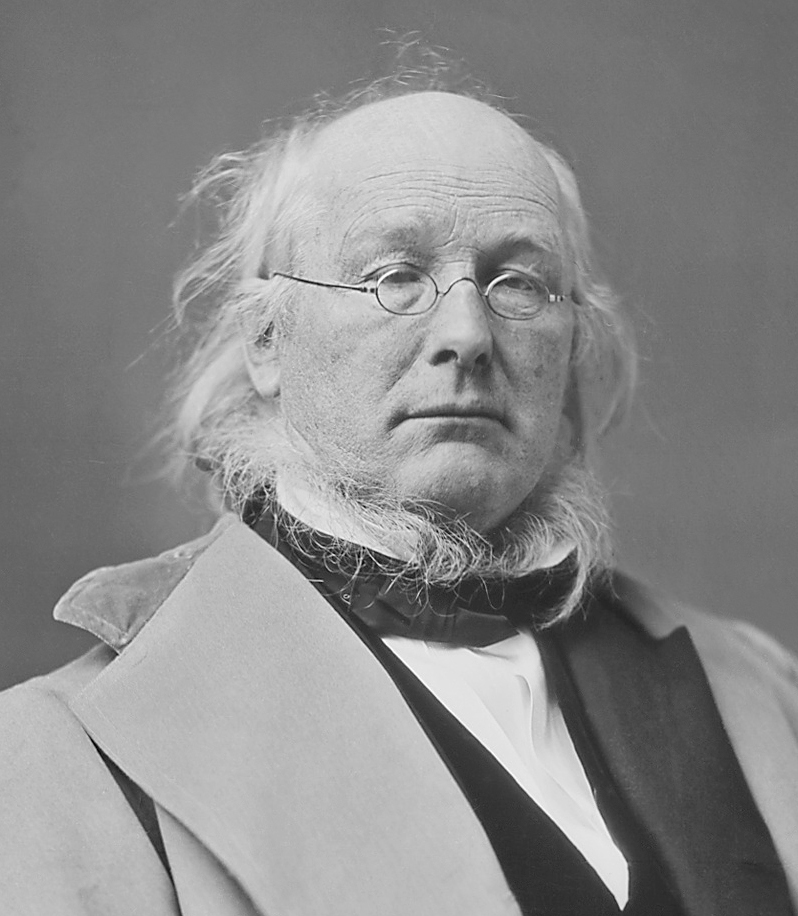
Nominee	Ulysses S. Grant	Horace Greeley
Party	Republican	Liberal Republican
Home state	Illinois	New York
Running mate	Henry Wilson	Benjamin G. Brown
Electoral vote	3	0
Popular vote	11,129	10,205
Percentage	51.00%	46.76%
County results
Grant
40–50%
50–60%
Greeley
50–60%
President before election
Ulysses S. Grant
Republican
Elected President
Ulysses S. Grant
Republican

The 1872 United States presidential election in Delaware took place on November 5, 1872, as part of the 1872 United States presidential election. Voters chose three representatives, or electors to the Electoral College, who voted for president and vice president.

Delaware voted for the Republican candidate, Ulysses S. Grant, over Liberal Republican candidate Horace Greeley. Grant won Delaware by a narrow margin of 4.24%, making him the first Republican to win the state in a presidential election. It would not be carried by another Republican presidential candidate until William McKinley won it in 1896.

== Results ==
General Election Results
Party	Pledged to	Elector	Votes
Republican Party	Ulysses S. Grant	David W. Moore	11,129
Republican Party	Ulysses S. Grant	Benjamin S. Booth	11,115
Republican Party	Ulysses S. Grant	William T. Collins	11,113
Liberal Republican Party	Horace Greeley	Albert Whiteley	10,208
Liberal Republican Party	Horace Greeley	William G. Whiteley	10,205
Liberal Republican Party	Horace Greeley	George W. Willen	10,172
Straight-Out Democratic Party	Charles O'Conor	William H. Ross	487
Straight-Out Democratic Party	Charles O'Conor	William Reynolds	483
Straight-Out Democratic Party	Charles O'Conor	Thomas D. Cubbage	466
Write-in		Scattering	1 (Note: There was one vote each for George G. Harmon, John G. Graham, and Edward Lord in Kent County. These appear to have been cast by a single voter for a separate slate of electors. Some sources count this as a vote for O'Conor. Burnham correctly lists 488 "Other" votes, but notes on page 901 that the breakdown was 487 for O'Conor and 1 Scattering.)
Votes cast (Note: Based on highest elector on each ticket)			21,822

=== Results by county ===
County	Ulysses S. Grant Republican		Horace Greeley Liberal Republican		Charles O'Conor Straight-Out Democratic		Margin		Total votes cast
County	#	%	#	%	#	%	#	%	Total votes cast
Kent	2,436	45.37%	2,863	53.32%	69	1.29%	-427	-7.95%	5,369 (Note: Includes 1 Scattering vote)
New Castle	5,844	55.36%	4,564	43.23%	149	1.41%	1,280	12.12%	10,557
Sussex	2,849	48.32%	2,778	47.12%	269	4.56%	71	1.20%	5,896
Totals	11,129	51.00%	10,205	46.76%	487	2.23%	924	4.23%	21,822

==== Counties that flipped from Democratic to Republican ====
- New Castle
- Sussex

== See also ==
- United States presidential elections in Delaware
