= 1956 United States presidential election in Delaware =

- November 6, 1956

All 3 Delaware votes to the Electoral College

Nominee	Dwight D. Eisenhower	Adlai Stevenson
Party	Republican	Democratic
Home state	Pennsylvania (Note: Although he was born in Texas and grew up in Kansas before his military career, at the time of the 1952 election Eisenhower was president of Columbia University and was, officially, a resident of New York. During his first term as president, he moved his private residence to Gettysburg, Pennsylvania, and officially changed his residency to Pennsylvania.)	Illinois
Running mate	Richard Nixon	Estes Kefauver
Electoral vote	3	0
Popular vote	98,057	79,421
Percentage	55.09%	44.62%
County results
Eisenhower
50–60%
President before election
Dwight D. Eisenhower
Republican
Elected President
Dwight D. Eisenhower
Republican

The 1956 United States presidential election in Delaware took place on November 6, 1956, as part of the 1956 United States presidential election. State voters chose three representatives, or electors, to the Electoral College, who voted for president and vice president.

Delaware was won by incumbent President Dwight D. Eisenhower (R–Pennsylvania), running with Vice President Richard Nixon, with 55.09% of the popular vote, against Adlai Stevenson (D–Illinois), running with Senator Estes Kefauver, with 44.62% of the popular vote.

== Results ==
1956 United States presidential election in Delaware
Party	Candidate	Votes	%
Republican	Dwight D. Eisenhower (inc.)	98,057	55.09%
Democratic	Adlai Stevenson	79,421	44.62%
Prohibition	Enoch A. Holtwick	400	0.22%
Socialist Labor	Eric Hass	110	0.06%
Total votes		177,988	100.00%

=== Results by county ===
County	Dwight D. Eisenhower Republican		Adlai Stevenson Democratic		All Others Various		Margin		Total votes cast
County	#	%	#	%	#	%	#	%	Total votes cast
Kent	10,303	52.18%	9,319	47.20%	123	0.62%	984	4.98%	19,745
New Castle	71,133	55.65%	56,405	44.13%	275	0.21%	14,728	11.52%	127,813
Sussex	16,621	54.62%	13,697	45.01%	112	0.37%	2,924	9.61%	30,430
Totals	98,057	55.09%	79,421	44.62%	510	0.29%	18,636	10.47%	177,988

== See also ==
- United States presidential elections in Delaware
