= 1908 United States presidential election in Delaware =

- November 3, 1908

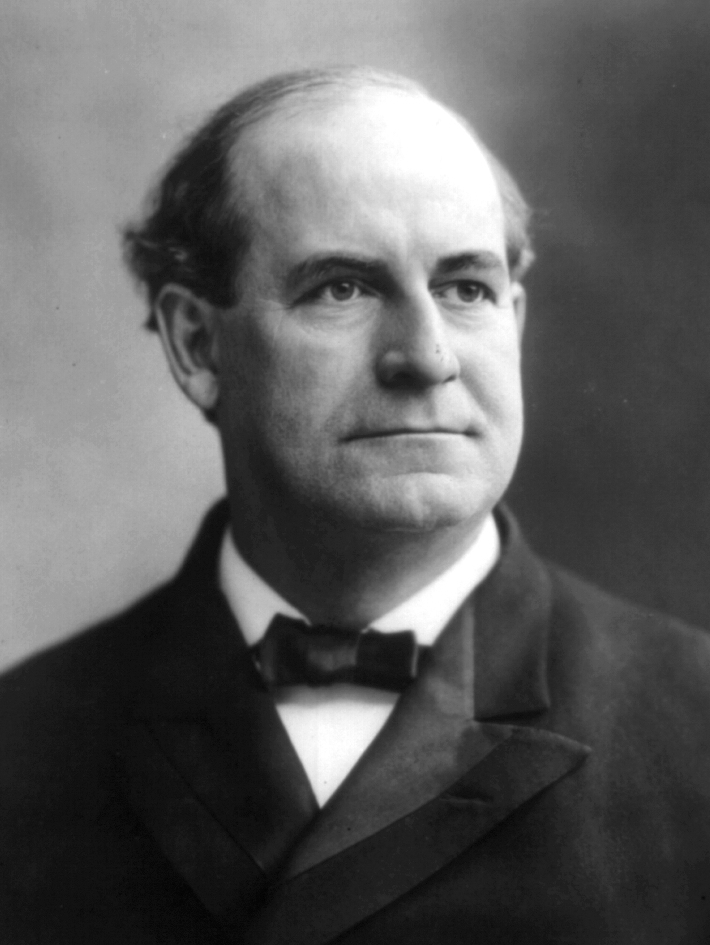
| Nominee | William Howard Taft | William Jennings Bryan |
| Party | Republican | Democratic |
| Home state | Ohio | Nebraska |
| Running mate | James S. Sherman | John W. Kern |
| Electoral vote | 3 | 0 |
| Popular vote | 25,014 | 22,071 |
| Percentage | 52.09% | 45.96% |
County results
Taft
40–50%
50–60%
President before election
Theodore Roosevelt
Republican
Elected President
William Howard Taft
Republican

The 1908 United States presidential election in Delaware took place on November 3, 1908. All contemporary 46 states were part of the 1908 United States presidential election. State voters chose three electors to the Electoral College, which selected the president and vice president.

Delaware was won by the Republican nominees, former Secretary of War William Howard Taft of Ohio and his running mate James S. Sherman of New York. They defeated the Democratic nominees, former U.S. Representative William Jennings Bryan of Nebraska and his running mate John W. Kern. Taft won the state by a margin of 6.13%.

Bryan had previously lost Delaware to William McKinley in both 1896 and 1900.

== Results ==
General Election Results
| Party | Pledged to | Elector | Votes |
|---|---|---|---|
| Republican Party | William Howard Taft | Henry P. Scott | 25,014 |
| Republican Party | William Howard Taft | Jacob E. Kirk | 25,008 |
| Republican Party | William Howard Taft | Charles H. Sackett | 24,999 |
| Democratic Party | William Jennings Bryan | John H. Jones | 22,071 |
| Democratic Party | William Jennings Bryan | Joshua A. Ellegood | 22,068 |
| Democratic Party | William Jennings Bryan | William A. Scott | 22,055 |
| Prohibition Party | Eugene W. Chafin | John R. Price | 670 |
| Prohibition Party | Eugene W. Chafin | George A. Rhoads | 670 |
| Prohibition Party | Eugene W. Chafin | James D. West | 669 |
| Socialist Party | Eugene V. Debs | John P. Edwards | 239 |
| Socialist Party | Eugene V. Debs | Charles Keolig | 239 |
| Socialist Party | Eugene V. Debs | Jerome Handloser | 239 |
| Independence Party | Thomas L. Hisgen | Adalbert Seydell | 30 |
| Independence Party | Thomas L. Hisgen | George W. Quinn | 29 |
| Independence Party | Thomas L. Hisgen | Levi G. Sterner | 7 |
| Votes cast (Note: Based on highest elector on each ticket) | | | 48,024 |

=== Results by county ===
| County | William Howard Taft Republican | | William Jennings Bryan Democratic | | Eugene W. Chafin Prohibition | | Eugene V. Debs Socialist | | Thomas L. Hisgen Independence | | Margin | | Total votes cast |
| County | # | % | # | % | # | % | # | % | # | % | # | % | Total votes cast |
|---|---|---|---|---|---|---|---|---|---|---|---|---|---|
| Kent | 4,158 | 49.78% | 4,093 | 49.00% | 101 | 1.21% | 0 | 0.00% | 1 | 0.01% | 65 | 0.78% | 8,353 |
| New Castle | 14,987 | 52.31% | 12,965 | 45.25% | 437 | 1.53% | 239 | 0.83% | 22 | 0.08% | 2,022 | 7.06% | 28,650 |
| Sussex | 5,869 | 53.25% | 5,013 | 45.49% | 132 | 1.20% | 0 | 0.00% | 7 | 0.06% | 856 | 7.77% | 11,021 |
| Totals | 25,014 | 52.09% | 22,071 | 45.96% | 670 | 1.40% | 239 | 0.50% | 30 | 0.06% | 2,943 | 6.13% | 48,024 |

== See also ==
- United States presidential elections in Delaware
