= 1932 United States presidential election in Delaware =

- November 8, 1932

Nominee	Herbert Hoover	Franklin D. Roosevelt
Party	Republican	Democratic
Home state	California	New York
Running mate	Charles Curtis	John Nance Garner
Electoral vote	3	0
Popular vote	57,073	54,319
Percentage	50.55%	48.11%
County results
Hoover
50–60%
Roosevelt
50–60%
President before election
Herbert Hoover
Republican
Elected President
Franklin D. Roosevelt
Democratic

The 1932 United States presidential election in Delaware took place on November 8, 1932, as part of the 1932 United States presidential election which was held throughout all contemporary 48 states. Voters chose three representatives, or electors to the Electoral College, who voted for president and vice president.

Delaware voted for the Republican nominee, incumbent President Herbert Hoover of California, over the Democratic nominee, Governor Franklin D. Roosevelt of New York. Hoover's running mate was incumbent Vice President Charles Curtis of Kansas, while Roosevelt ran with incumbent Speaker of the House John Nance Garner of Texas.

Hoover won the state by a narrow margin of 2.44%, making Delaware one of the only six states (the other five being Connecticut, Maine, New Hampshire, Pennsylvania and Vermont) which voted to re-elect the embattled Republican incumbent president, who was widely unpopular over his failure to adequately address the Great Depression. With 50.55% of the popular vote. it was his fourth strongest state in the nation after Vermont, Maine, and neighboring Pennsylvania.

As of 2023, this is the most recent time that a Democrat won the presidency without carrying New Castle County. This election marks one of three times in the 20th century that the state voted for the losing candidate, along with 1916 and 1948.

== Results ==
General Election Results
Party	Pledged to	Elector	Votes
Republican Party	Herbert Hoover	Joseph Warren Marshall	57,073
Republican Party	Herbert Hoover	Harry V. Lyons	56,837
Republican Party	Herbert Hoover	Daniel Mifflin Wilson	56,795
Democratic Party	Franklin D. Roosevelt	Hugh M. Morris	54,319
Democratic Party	Franklin D. Roosevelt	John B. Hutton	53,940
Democratic Party	Franklin D. Roosevelt	Willard F. Deputy	53,885
Socialist Party	Norman Thomas	James A. McClelland	1,376
Socialist Party	Norman Thomas	I. Strauss	1,332
Socialist Party	Norman Thomas	G. J. Teigland	1,328
Communist Party	William Z. Foster	John D. Haman	133
Communist Party	William Z. Foster	Harold Sammons	128
Communist Party	William Z. Foster	Nicolas Minutella	124
Votes cast (Note: Based on highest elector on each ticket)			112,901

=== Results by county ===
County	Herbert Hoover Republican		Franklin D. Roosevelt Democratic		Norman Thomas Socialist		William Z. Foster Communist		Margin		Total votes cast
County	#	%	#	%	#	%	#	%	#	%	Total votes cast
Kent	6,597	42.59%	8,829	57.00%	44	0.28%	20	0.13%	-2,232	-14.41%	15,490
New Castle	39,844	53.76%	32,872	44.36%	1,280	1.73%	113	0.15%	6,972	9.41%	74,109
Sussex	10,632	45.63%	12,618	54.15%	52	0.22%	0	0.00%	-1,986	-8.52%	23,302
Totals	57,073	50.55%	54,319	48.11%	1,376	1.22%	133	0.12%	2,754	2.44%	112,901

==== Counties that flipped from Republican to Democratic ====
- Kent
- Sussex

== See also ==
- United States presidential elections in Delaware
