= Jerome Smith (American football) =

American football player (born 1991)

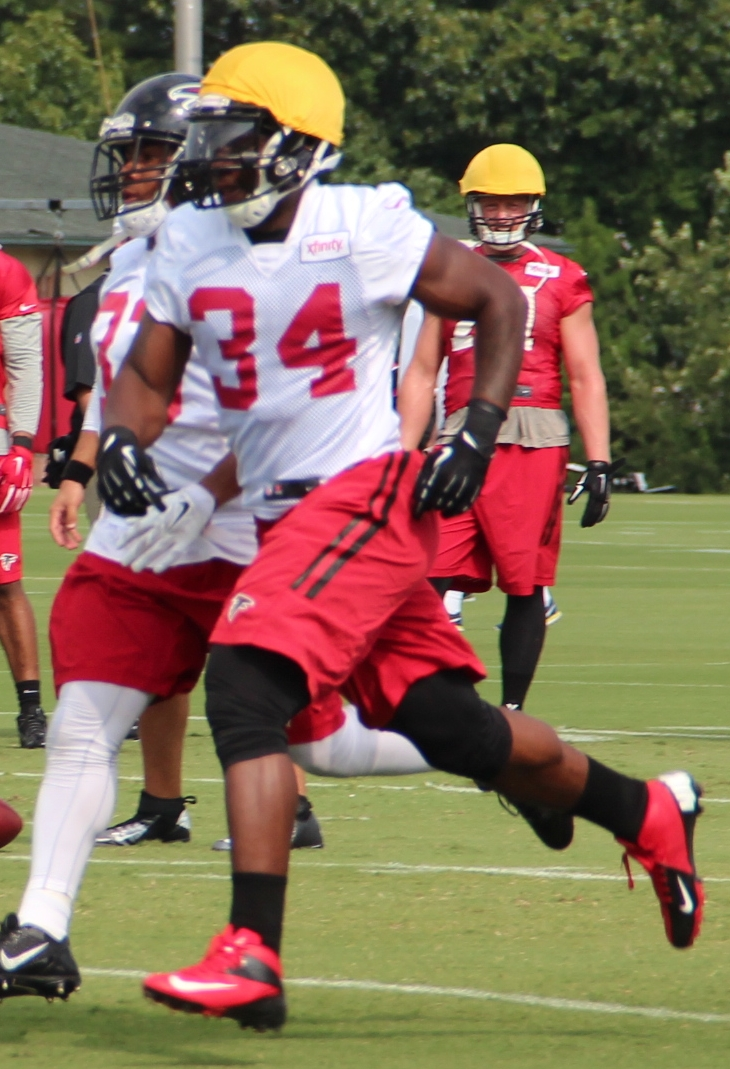
- Smith in 2015

Robert Morris Colonials
- Title: Running backs coach

Personal information
- Born: April 6, 1991 (age 35); Chester, Pennsylvania, U.S.
- Listed height: 6 ft 0 in (1.83 m)
- Listed weight: 226 lb (103 kg)

Career information
- High school: New Castle (DE) Pencader Charter
- College: Syracuse
- NFL draft: 2014: undrafted

Career history

Playing
- Atlanta Falcons (2014–2015)

Coaching
- Morgan State (2019–2021) Running backs coach & assistant special teams coordinator; ASA Brooklyn (2022) Special teams coordinator & running backs coach; Robert Morris (2023–present) Running backs coach
- Stats at Pro Football Reference

Jerome Hassan Smith (born April 6, 1991) is an American former football running back and current college football coach. He is the running backs coach for Robert Morris University, a position he has held since 2023. He was born in Chester, Pennsylvania and played college football at Syracuse University before being signed as an undrafted free agent by the Atlanta Falcons of the National Football League in 2014. He was promoted to the active roster on December 24.

In 2015, Smith was on the Falcons pre-season roster but did not survive the final cuts to make the 53 man team. He is currently the Running Backs Coach at Morgan State University.
