= 1948 United States presidential election in Delaware =

- November 2, 1948

All 3 Delaware votes to the Electoral College
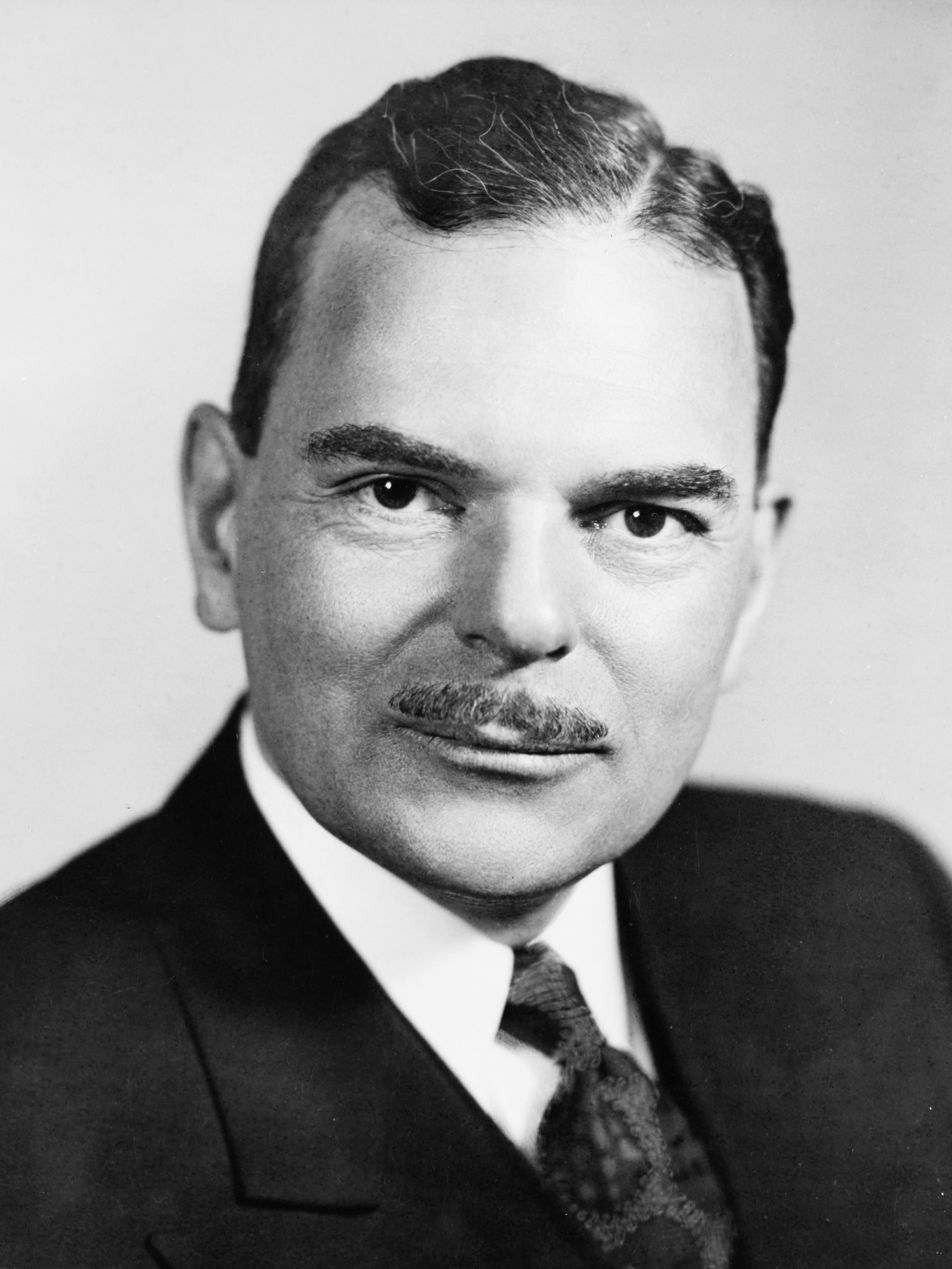

Nominee	Thomas E. Dewey	Harry S. Truman
Party	Republican	Democratic
Home state	New York	Missouri
Running mate	Earl Warren	Alben W. Barkley
Electoral vote	3	0
Popular vote	69,588	67,813
Percentage	50.04%	48.76%
County results
Dewey
50–60%
Truman
40–50%
President before election
Harry S. Truman
Democratic
Elected President
Harry S. Truman
Democratic

The 1948 United States presidential election in Delaware took place on November 2, 1948, as part of the 1948 United States presidential election. State voters chose three representatives, or electors, to the Electoral College, who voted for president and vice president.

Delaware was won by Governor Thomas E. Dewey (R–New York), running with Governor Earl Warren, with 50.04% of the popular vote, against incumbent President Harry S. Truman (D–Missouri), running with Senator Alben W. Barkley, with 48.76% of the popular vote. This is the last time that New Castle County did not back the statewide winner and when the Democratic candidate would win a presidential election without Delaware.

This election marked one of only three occasions during the 20th century in which Delaware voted for the losing presidential candidate, the others occurring in 1916 and 1932. As this was the last election until 2000 when Delaware failed to support the overall winner of the presidency, and the electoral college after which the state has leaned Democratic. However, it has since voted for the popular vote loser only twice, in 2004 and 2024.

== Results ==
1948 United States presidential election in Delaware
Party	Candidate	Votes	%
Republican	Thomas E. Dewey	69,588	50.04%
Democratic	Harry S. Truman (inc.)	67,813	48.76%
Progressive	Henry A. Wallace	1,050	0.75%
Prohibition	Claude A. Watson	343	0.25%
Socialist	Norman Thomas	250	0.18%
Socialist Labor	Edward A. Teichert	29	0.02%
Total votes		139,073	100.00%

=== Results by county ===
County	Thomas E. Dewey Republican		Harry S. Truman Democratic		Henry A. Wallace Progressive		All Others Various		Margin		Total votes cast
County	#	%	#	%	#	%	#	%	#	%	Total votes cast
Kent	8,501	50.63%	8,174	48.68%	47	0.28%	68	0.41%	327	1.95%	16,790
New Castle	47,451	48.92%	48,117	49.60%	950	0.98%	483	0.50%	-666	-0.69%	97,001
Sussex	13,636	53.94%	11,522	45.57%	53	0.21%	71	0.28%	2,114	8.36%	25,282
Totals	69,588	50.04%	67,813	48.76%	1,050	0.75%	622	0.45%	1,775	1.28%	139,073

==== Counties that flipped from Democratic to Republican ====
- Kent

== See also ==
- United States presidential elections in Delaware
