= 1932 United States presidential election in Maine =

- November 8, 1932

Nominee	Herbert Hoover	Franklin D. Roosevelt
Party	Republican	Democratic
Home state	California	New York
Running mate	Charles Curtis	John Nance Garner
Electoral vote	5	0
Popular vote	166,631	128,907
Percentage	55.83%	43.19%
County results
Hoover
50–60%
60–70%
Roosevelt
50–60%
President before election
Herbert Hoover
Republican
Elected President
Franklin D. Roosevelt
Democratic

The 1932 United States presidential election in Maine took place on November 8, 1932, as part of the 1932 United States presidential election which was held throughout all contemporary 48 states. Voters chose five representatives, or electors to the Electoral College, who voted for president and vice president.

Maine voted for the Republican nominee, incumbent President Herbert Hoover of California, over the Democratic nominee, Governor Franklin D. Roosevelt of New York. Hoover's running mate was incumbent Vice President Charles Curtis of Kansas, while Roosevelt ran with incumbent Speaker of the House John Nance Garner of Texas.

Hoover won Maine by a margin of 12.64%, and with 55.83% of the popular vote, it would be his second strongest state in the nation after nearby Vermont. The state was also one of only six states (the other five being Connecticut, Delaware, New Hampshire, Pennsylvania and Vermont), four of them in New England, which voted to re-elect the embattled Republican incumbent Hoover, who was widely unpopular over his failure to adequately address the Great Depression. Maine would also be one of the only two states in the nation (the other being nearby Vermont) to not vote for Roosevelt in any of his four election campaigns.

== Results ==
1932 United States presidential election in Maine
Party	Candidate	Running mate	Popular vote		Electoral vote	
Party	Candidate	Running mate	Count	%	Count	%
Republican	Herbert Hoover of California (incumbent)	Charles Curtis of Kansas (incumbent)	166,631	55.83%	5	100.00%
Democratic	Franklin Delano Roosevelt of New York	John Nance Garner of Texas	128,907	43.19%	0	0.00%
Socialist	Norman Thomas of New York	James Hudson Maurer of Pennsylvania	2,489	0.83%	0	0.00%
Socialist Labor	Verne L. Reynolds of New York	John W. Aiken of Massachusetts	255	0.09%	0	0.00%
Communist	William Z. Foster of Massachusetts	James W. Ford of Alabama	162	0.05%	0	0.00%
Total			298,444	100.00%	5	100.00%

=== Results by county ===
County	Herbert Clark Hoover Republican		Franklin Delano Roosevelt Democratic		Normal Mattoon Thomas Socialist		Verne L. Reynolds Socialist Labor		William Z. Foster Communist		Margin		Total votes cast
County	#	%	#	%	#	%	#	%	#	%	#	%	Total votes cast
Androscoggin	9,838	40.05%	14,441	58.79%	251	1.02%	17	0.07%	15	0.06%	-4,603	-18.74%	24,562
Aroostook	14,054	59.47%	9,409	39.82%	122	0.52%	25	0.11%	21	0.09%	4,645	19.66%	23,631
Cumberland	32,864	60.82%	20,655	38.23%	465	0.86%	24	0.04%	25	0.05%	12,209	22.60%	54,033
Franklin	4,521	58.46%	3,171	41.01%	35	0.45%	4	0.05%	2	0.03%	1,350	17.46%	7,733
Hancock	7,942	64.07%	4,369	35.25%	75	0.61%	9	0.07%	1	0.01%	3,573	28.82%	12,396
Kennebec	14,451	53.93%	12,110	45.19%	188	0.70%	28	0.10%	20	0.07%	2,341	8.74%	26,797
Knox	6,169	55.28%	4,765	42.70%	168	1.51%	34	0.30%	23	0.21%	1,404	12.58%	11,159
Lincoln	4,666	63.84%	2,602	35.60%	37	0.51%	2	0.03%	2	0.03%	2,064	28.24%	7,309
Oxford	8,264	52.73%	7,179	45.80%	194	1.24%	19	0.12%	17	0.11%	1,085	6.92%	15,673
Penobscot	18,987	58.75%	13,058	40.41%	247	0.76%	18	0.06%	7	0.02%	5,929	18.35%	32,317
Piscataquis	4,198	59.14%	2,849	40.13%	45	0.63%	5	0.07%	2	0.03%	1,349	19.00%	7,099
Sagadahoc	4,220	59.97%	2,763	39.26%	44	0.63%	5	0.07%	5	0.07%	1,457	20.70%	7,037
Somerset	7,144	53.07%	6,040	44.87%	258	1.92%	11	0.08%	8	0.06%	1,104	8.20%	13,461
Waldo	4,505	53.21%	3,907	46.14%	51	0.60%	3	0.04%	1	0.01%	598	7.06%	8,467
Washington	7,507	51.95%	6,829	47.26%	85	0.59%	25	0.17%	5	0.03%	678	4.69%	14,451
York	17,301	53.53%	14,760	45.67%	224	0.69%	26	0.08%	8	0.02%	2,541	7.86%	32,319
Totals	166,631	55.83%	128,907	43.19%	2,489	0.83%	255	0.09%	162	0.05%	37,724	12.64%	298,444

==== Counties that flipped from Republican to Democratic ====
- Androscoggin

== See also ==
- United States presidential elections in Maine
