= Hindu Temple of Delaware =

Hindu temple in Hockessin, Delaware

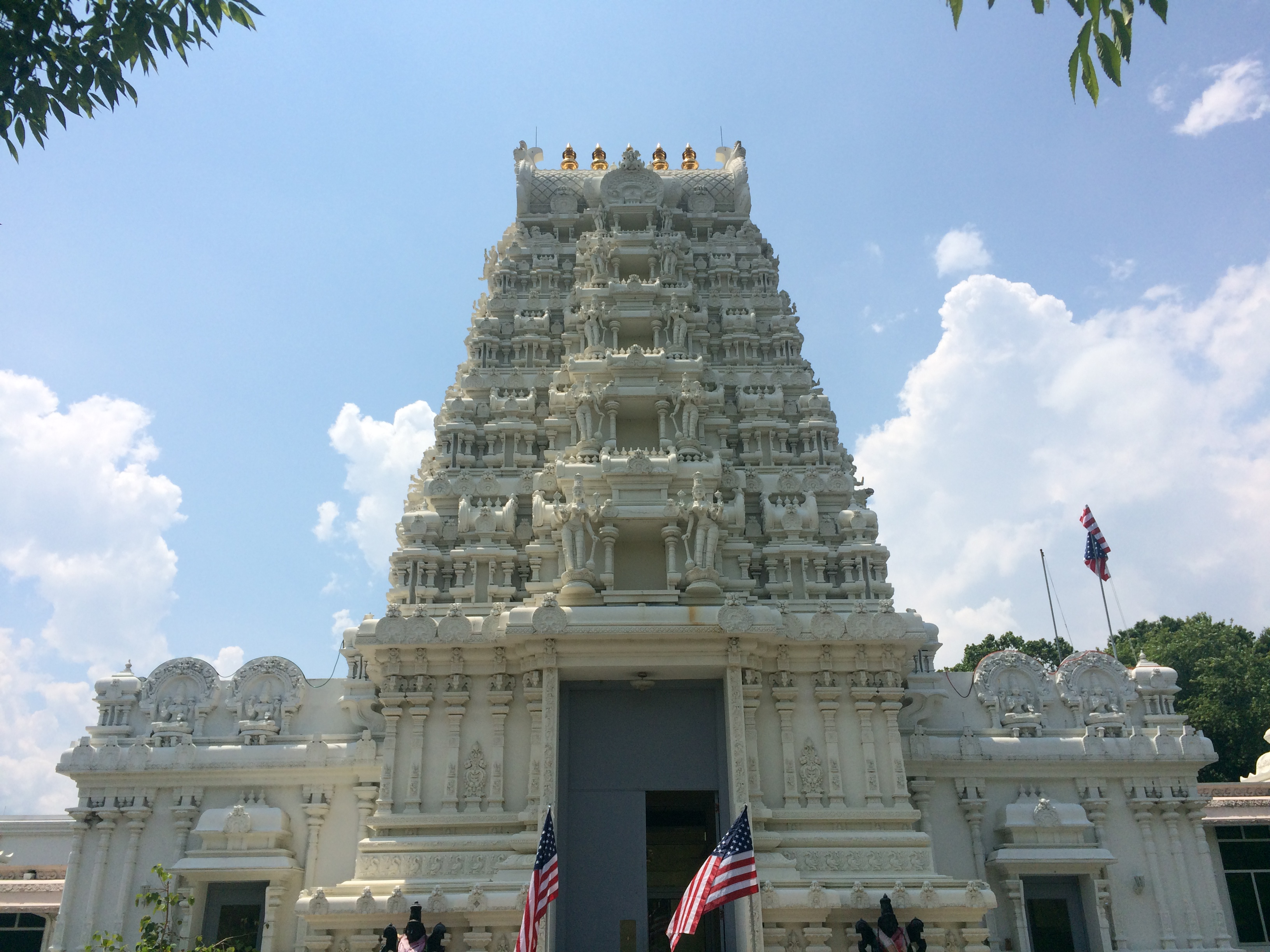

- Location in Delaware

Religion
- Affiliation: Hinduism
- Deity: Lakshmi
- Status: Open

Location
- Location: 760 Yorklyn Road, Hockessin, Delaware 19707
- Country: United States
- Interactive map of Hindu Temple of Delaware
- Coordinates: 39.79074°N 75.68768°W

Architecture
- Founder: The Hindu Temple Association of Hockessin
- Completed: 2002

Website
- hindutemplede.org

The Hindu Temple of Delaware is a Hindu temple in Hockessin, Delaware. Inaugurated in 2002, it is the first Hindu temple constructed in Delaware. According to The News Journal, the temple has become "a social and cultural gathering place" for Indian Americans in New Castle County.

The temple's main deity is Lakshmi, the goddess of wealth and prosperity.

== History ==
In the late 20th century, Indian immigrant families in Delaware started gathering at local churches and schools to worship and celebrate Hindu festivals. As the local Indian American population grew, these families formed the Hindu Temple Association of Hockessin. The association conducted fundraisers to raise money to buy land to build a temple. After raising enough funds, the association purchased five acres of land. In 1996, construction began on the site. In 2002, the temple was inaugurated with the Kumbhabhishekham ceremony.

In 2020, a 25-foot statue of Hanuman, the god of courage and wisdom, was installed at the temple entrance. It is the second tallest Hanuman statue in the United States and weighs 60,000 pounds.

== Administration ==
The temple is administered by a board of trustees.

== See also ==
- List of Hindu temples in the United States
