= 1900 United States presidential election in Delaware =

- November 6, 1900
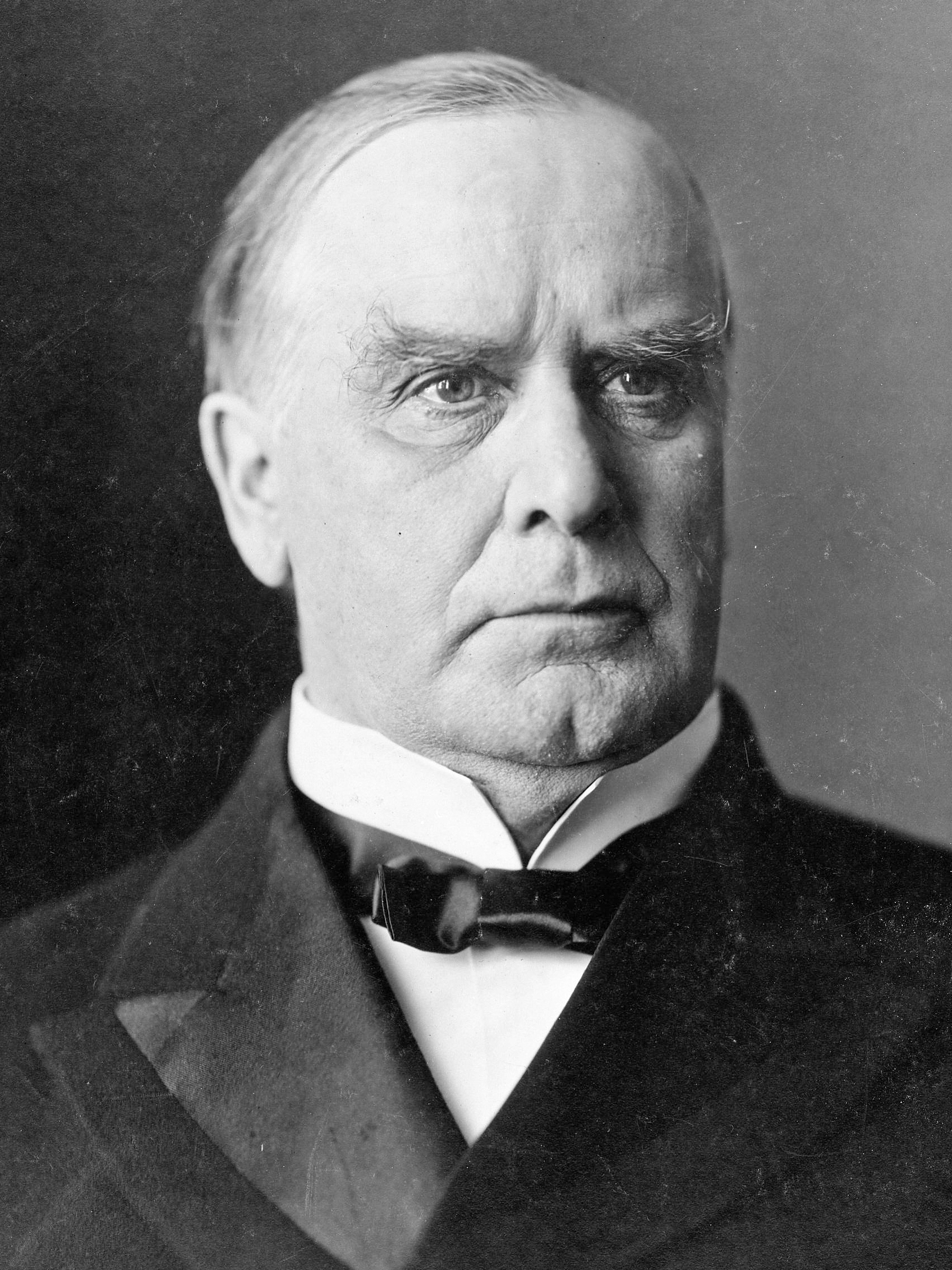

Nominee	William McKinley	William Jennings Bryan
Party	Republican	Democratic
Home state	Ohio	Nebraska
Running mate	Theodore Roosevelt	Adlai Stevenson I
Electoral vote	3	0
Popular vote	22,535	18,863
Percentage	53.65%	44.91%
County results
McKinley
40–50%
50–60%
President before election
William McKinley
Republican
Elected President
William McKinley
Republican

The 1900 United States presidential election in Delaware took place on November 6, 1900. All contemporary 45 states were part of the 1900 United States presidential election. State voters chose three electors to the Electoral College, which selected the president and vice president.

Delaware was won by the Republican nominees, incumbent President William McKinley of Ohio and his running mate Theodore Roosevelt of New York. They defeated the Democratic nominees, former U.S. Representative and 1896 Democratic presidential nominee William Jennings Bryan and his running mate, former Vice President Adlai Stevenson I. McKinley won the state by a margin of 8.77% in this rematch of the 1896 presidential election. The return of economic prosperity and recent victory in the Spanish–American War helped McKinley score a decisive victory.

Bryan had previously lost Delaware to McKinley four years earlier and would later lose the state again in 1908 to William Howard Taft.

== Results ==
General Election Results
Party	Pledged to	Elector	Votes
Republican Party	William McKinley	Charles W. Pusey	22,535
Republican Party	William McKinley	Manlove Hayes	22,530
Republican Party	William McKinley	Daniel J. Layton	22,522
Democratic Party	William Jennings Bryan	William E. Cannon	18,863
Democratic Party	William Jennings Bryan	William G. Postles	18,859
Democratic Party	William Jennings Bryan	John H. Rodney	18,852
Prohibition Party	John G. Woolley	Ashton R. Tatum	546
Prohibition Party	John G. Woolley	Alfred Smith	540
Prohibition Party	John G. Woolley	George P. Tunnell	538
Social Democratic Party	Eugene V. Debs	Max E. Goetz	57
Social Democratic Party	Eugene V. Debs	James A. Campbell	56
Social Democratic Party	Eugene V. Debs	Paul Koehler	56
Votes cast (Note: Based on highest elector on each ticket)			42,001

=== Results by county ===
County	William McKinley Republican		William Jennings Bryan Democratic		John G. Woolley Prohibition		Eugene V. Debs Socialist		Margin		Total votes cast
County	#	%	#	%	#	%	#	%	#	%	Total votes cast
Kent	3,928	49.76%	3,855	48.83%	108	1.37%	3	0.04%	73	0.92%	7,894
New Castle	13,646	55.38%	10,644	43.20%	297	1.21%	54	0.22%	3,002	12.18%	24,641
Sussex	4,961	52.41%	4,364	46.10%	141	1.49%	0	0.00%	597	6.31%	9,466
Totals	22,535	53.65%	18,863	44.91%	546	1.30%	57	0.14%	3,672	8.74%	42,001

== See also ==
- United States presidential elections in Delaware
