= 1932 United States presidential election in Vermont =

- November 8, 1932

Nominee	Herbert Hoover	Franklin D. Roosevelt
Party	Republican	Democratic
Home state	California	New York
Running mate	Charles Curtis	John N. Garner
Electoral vote	3	0
Popular vote	78,984	56,266
Percentage	57.66%	41.08%

Hoover
40–50%
50–60%
60–70%
70–80%
80–90%
90–100%
Roosevelt
40–50%
50–60%
60–70%
70–80%
80–90%
90–100%
Tie
40–50%
President before election
Herbert Hoover
Republican
Elected President
Franklin D. Roosevelt
Democratic

The 1932 United States presidential election in Vermont took place on November 8, 1932, as part of the 1932 United States presidential election which was held throughout all contemporary 48 states. Voters chose three representatives, or electors to the Electoral College, who voted for president and vice president.

Vermont voted for the Republican nominee, incumbent President Herbert Hoover of California, over the Democratic nominee, Governor Franklin D. Roosevelt of New York. Hoover's running mate was incumbent Vice President Charles Curtis of Kansas, while Roosevelt ran with incumbent Speaker of the House John Nance Garner of Texas.

Hoover took 57.66% of the vote to Roosevelt's 41.08%, a margin of 16.58%. Vermont historically was a bastion of Northeastern Republicanism, and by 1932 it had gone Republican in every presidential election since the founding of the Republican Party. From 1856 to 1928, Vermont had had the longest streak of voting Republican of any state, having never voted Democratic before, and this tradition continued even in the midst of a nationwide Democratic landslide in 1932. However, Roosevelt became the first Democrat to carry more than one county, as Woodrow Wilson had done in both his runs, since 1844-- nearly a century before.

Vermont was one of only six states (the other five states being Connecticut, Delaware, neighboring New Hampshire, Maine and Pennsylvania), four of them in New England, which voted to re-elect the embattled Republican incumbent Hoover, who was widely unpopular over his failure to adequately address the Great Depression. Vermont would ultimately be one of only two states (along with nearby Maine) that would reject FDR in all four of his presidential campaigns.

In terms of both vote share and margin, Vermont was the most Republican state in the nation. Vermont would weigh in as a whopping 34% more Republican than the national average in the 1932 election. However, Roosevelt was the first Democrat to get over 40% of the vote in the state since 1836.

Hoover carried eleven of the state's 14 counties, breaking sixty percent in seven. However, the three northwestern counties of Vermont would become New Deal Democratic enclaves in an otherwise Republican state. In 1928, Al Smith had become the first ever Democrat to win Chittenden County, the state's most populous county and home to its largest city, Burlington. In 1932, Roosevelt would carry Chittenden County for the Democrats as Smith did in 1928, but also flip Franklin County and Grand Isle County into the Democratic column. All three counties would remain loyally Democratic in the elections that followed until Dwight D. Eisenhower’s Republican landslide of 1952.

== Results ==
1932 United States presidential election in Vermont
Party	Candidate	Votes	Percentage	Electoral votes
Republican	Herbert Hoover (incumbent)	78,984	57.66%	3
Democratic	Franklin D. Roosevelt	56,266	41.08%	0
Socialist	Norman Thomas	1,533	1.12%	0
Communist	William Z. Foster	195	0.14%	0
N/A	Write-ins	2	0.00%	0
Totals		136,980	100.00%	3

=== Results by county ===
County	Herbert Clark Hoover Republican		Franklin Delano Roosevelt Democratic		Norman Mattoon Thomas Socialist		Various candidates Other parties		Margin		Total votes cast
County	#	%	#	%	#	%	#	%	#	%	Total votes cast
Addison	5,295	62.83%	3,031	35.96%	89	1.06%	13	0.15%	2,264	26.86%	8,428
Bennington	5,250	55.76%	3,964	42.10%	185	1.96%	17	0.18%	1,286	13.66%	9,416
Caledonia	6,066	62.27%	3,621	37.17%	46	0.47%	8	0.08%	2,445	25.10%	9,741
Chittenden	7,208	43.86%	9,104	55.39%	112	0.68%	11	0.07%	-1,896	-11.54%	16,435
Essex	1,567	52.58%	1,397	46.88%	12	0.40%	4	0.13%	170	5.70%	2,980
Franklin	4,999	44.29%	6,179	54.75%	74	0.66%	34	0.30%	-1,180	-10.46%	11,286
Grand Isle	649	43.94%	811	54.91%	15	1.02%	2	0.14%	-162	-10.97%	1,477
Lamoille	2,599	69.70%	1,096	29.39%	30	0.80%	4	0.11%	1,503	40.31%	3,729
Orange	4,305	69.30%	1,830	29.46%	70	1.13%	7	0.11%	2,475	39.84%	6,212
Orleans	5,132	66.40%	2,530	32.73%	61	0.79%	6	0.08%	2,602	33.67%	7,729
Rutland	10,821	54.24%	8,924	44.73%	181	0.91%	25	0.13%	1,897	9.51%	19,951
Washington	8,393	57.72%	5,777	39.73%	339	2.33%	31	0.21%	2,616	17.99%	14,540
Windham	7,347	66.02%	3,659	32.88%	111	1.00%	12	0.11%	3,688	33.14%	11,129
Windsor	9,353	67.16%	4,343	31.18%	208	1.49%	23	0.17%	5,010	35.97%	13,927
Totals	78,984	57.66%	56,266	41.08%	1,533	1.12%	197	0.14%	22,718	16.58%	136,980

==== Counties flipped from Republican to Democratic ====
- Franklin
- Grand Isle

== See also ==
- United States presidential elections in Vermont
