= 1932 United States presidential election in Pennsylvania =

- November 8, 1932

Nominee	Herbert Hoover	Franklin D. Roosevelt
Party	Republican	Democratic
Home state	California	New York
Running mate	Charles Curtis	John N. Garner
Electoral vote	36	0
Popular vote	1,453,540	1,295,948
Percentage	50.84%	45.33%

Hoover
30–40%
40–50%
50–60%
60–70%
70–80%
80–90%
90–100%
Roosevelt
30–40%
40–50%
50–60%
60–70%
70–80%
80–90%
90–100%
Thomas
30–40%
40–50%
Tie
<50%
50%
President before election
Herbert Hoover
Republican
Elected President
Franklin D. Roosevelt
Democratic

The 1932 United States presidential election in Pennsylvania took place on November 8, 1932, as part of the 1932 United States presidential election. Voters chose 36 representatives, or electors to the Electoral College, who voted for president and vice president.

Pennsylvania voted for the Republican nominee, President Herbert Hoover, over the Democratic nominee, New York Governor Franklin D. Roosevelt. Hoover won Pennsylvania by a margin of 5.51%. With 50.84% of the popular vote, Pennsylvania would be Hoover's third strongest state in the nation after Vermont and Maine.

Pennsylvania was one of only six states – along with Connecticut, Delaware, Maine, New Hampshire, and Vermont – which voted to re-elect the embattled Hoover, who was widely unpopular over his failure to adequately address the Great Depression.

This is the last election where the Republican candidate carried Philadelphia County, then still controlled by a Republican political machine, in a presidential election. This was the last time that Luzerne County voted for the statewide losing candidate until 2020. This is also one of only four occasions where Pennsylvania and Michigan voted for different presidential candidates ever since the Democrats and Republicans became the two major parties in U.S. politics. (Note: The other times were in 1856, 1940, and 1976. Additionally, this was the only one of the four where Pennsylvania backed the Republican and Michigan backed the Democrat.)

== Results ==
1932 United States presidential election in Pennsylvania
Party	Candidate	Votes	Percentage	Electoral votes
Republican	Herbert Hoover (incumbent)	1,453,540	50.84%	36
Democratic	Franklin D. Roosevelt	1,295,948	45.33%	0
Socialist	Norman Thomas	91,223	3.19%	0
Prohibition	William Upshaw	11,369	0.40%	0
Communist	William Z. Foster	5,659	0.20%	0
Jobless	James Cox	726	0.03%	0
Industrialist	Verne L. Reynolds	659	0.02%	0
Totals		2,858,247	100.00%	36

=== Results by county ===
County	Herbert Hoover Republican		Franklin D. Roosevelt Democratic		Norman Thomas Socialist		Various candidates Other parties		Margin		Total votes cast
County	#	%	#	%	#	%	#	%	#	%	Total votes cast
Adams	6,084	45.09%	7,185	53.25%	158	1.17%	67	0.50%	-1,101	-8.16%	13,494
Allegheny	152,326	42.43%	189,839	52.88%	14,777	4.12%	2,061	0.57%	-37,513	-10.45%	359,003
Armstrong	10,884	52.10%	9,230	44.18%	483	2.31%	293	1.40%	1,654	7.92%	20,890
Beaver	19,751	47.87%	19,805	48.00%	1,325	3.21%	379	0.92%	-54	-0.13%	41,260
Bedford	6,597	54.29%	5,075	41.76%	350	2.88%	130	1.07%	1,522	12.52%	12,152
Berks	27,073	37.07%	29,763	40.76%	15,988	21.89%	199	0.27%	-2,690	-3.68%	73,023
Blair	19,553	56.95%	13,709	39.93%	840	2.45%	232	0.68%	5,844	17.02%	34,334
Bradford	11,521	63.34%	5,970	32.82%	562	3.09%	135	0.74%	5,551	30.52%	18,188
Bucks	22,331	59.07%	14,135	37.39%	1,203	3.18%	138	0.37%	8,196	21.68%	37,807
Butler	11,543	54.77%	8,717	41.36%	535	2.54%	280	1.33%	2,826	13.41%	21,075
Cambria	21,351	41.75%	28,197	55.13%	1,245	2.43%	352	0.69%	-6,846	-13.39%	51,145
Cameron	1,438	64.31%	748	33.45%	36	1.61%	14	0.63%	690	30.86%	2,236
Carbon	9,918	48.52%	9,874	48.30%	604	2.95%	45	0.22%	44	0.22%	20,441
Centre	8,264	52.55%	7,053	44.85%	244	1.55%	165	1.05%	1,211	7.70%	15,726
Chester	29,425	69.21%	12,040	28.32%	879	2.07%	173	0.41%	17,385	40.89%	42,517
Clarion	5,991	46.05%	6,651	51.12%	211	1.62%	158	1.21%	-660	-5.07%	13,011
Clearfield	10,500	46.84%	11,029	49.20%	675	3.01%	213	0.95%	-529	-2.36%	22,417
Clinton	4,851	54.54%	3,741	42.06%	244	2.74%	58	0.65%	1,110	12.48%	8,894
Columbia	8,791	44.43%	10,640	53.77%	186	0.94%	170	0.86%	-1,849	-9.34%	19,787
Crawford	10,918	51.72%	9,382	44.44%	505	2.39%	306	1.45%	1,536	7.28%	21,111
Cumberland	13,098	50.86%	12,086	46.93%	257	1.00%	310	1.20%	1,012	3.93%	25,751
Dauphin	36,278	60.31%	22,412	37.26%	1,098	1.83%	364	0.61%	13,866	23.05%	60,152
Delaware	75,291	68.19%	32,413	29.36%	2,372	2.15%	333	0.30%	42,878	38.84%	110,409
Elk	5,797	46.39%	6,461	51.70%	184	1.47%	55	0.44%	-664	-5.31%	12,497
Erie	18,371	45.43%	19,592	48.44%	2,027	5.01%	452	1.12%	-1,221	-3.02%	40,442
Fayette	15,903	35.26%	27,662	61.33%	1,222	2.71%	319	0.71%	-11,759	-26.07%	45,106
Forest	1,090	63.34%	569	33.06%	27	1.57%	35	2.03%	521	30.27%	1,721
Franklin	10,992	52.96%	9,338	44.99%	266	1.28%	161	0.78%	1,654	7.97%	20,757
Fulton	1,410	41.83%	1,921	56.99%	15	0.44%	25	0.74%	-511	-15.16%	3,371
Greene	4,808	33.41%	9,322	64.77%	111	0.77%	152	1.06%	-4,514	-31.36%	14,393
Huntingdon	7,371	66.39%	3,426	30.86%	181	1.63%	125	1.13%	3,945	35.53%	11,103
Indiana	12,727	57.24%	8,606	38.70%	625	2.81%	277	1.25%	4,121	18.53%	22,235
Jefferson	8,246	52.48%	6,570	41.81%	697	4.44%	200	1.27%	1,676	10.67%	15,713
Juniata	2,752	48.44%	2,805	49.38%	40	0.70%	84	1.48%	-53	-0.93%	5,681
Lackawanna	34,632	45.24%	40,793	53.28%	865	1.13%	270	0.35%	-6,161	-8.05%	76,560
Lancaster	34,502	56.54%	24,406	40.00%	1,757	2.88%	354	0.58%	10,096	16.55%	61,019
Lawrence	13,064	55.10%	9,390	39.61%	883	3.72%	372	1.57%	3,674	15.50%	23,709
Lebanon	10,487	58.97%	5,924	33.31%	1,256	7.06%	117	0.66%	4,563	25.66%	17,784
Lehigh	21,169	46.95%	21,939	48.65%	1,858	4.12%	127	0.28%	-770	-1.71%	45,093
Luzerne	52,672	45.44%	60,975	52.60%	1,943	1.68%	338	0.29%	-8,303	-7.16%	115,928
Lycoming	16,212	55.43%	11,499	39.31%	1,164	3.98%	375	1.28%	4,713	16.11%	29,250
McKean	9,970	65.01%	4,661	30.39%	607	3.96%	97	0.63%	5,309	34.62%	15,335
Mercer	14,057	53.53%	10,961	41.74%	827	3.15%	413	1.57%	3,096	11.79%	26,258
Mifflin	5,525	58.95%	3,654	38.99%	121	1.29%	72	0.77%	1,871	19.96%	9,372
Monroe	4,659	41.60%	6,357	56.76%	143	1.28%	40	0.36%	-1,698	-15.16%	11,199
Montgomery	64,619	64.00%	32,971	32.66%	3,168	3.14%	203	0.20%	31,648	31.35%	100,961
Montour	2,159	44.24%	2,677	54.86%	30	0.61%	14	0.29%	-518	-10.61%	4,880
Northampton	20,779	45.04%	24,009	52.04%	1,148	2.49%	197	0.43%	-3,230	-7.00%	46,133
Northumberland	17,982	42.35%	23,114	54.43%	1,265	2.98%	103	0.24%	-5,132	-12.09%	42,464
Perry	4,402	53.23%	3,733	45.14%	66	0.80%	68	0.82%	669	8.09%	8,269
Philadelphia	331,092	54.54%	260,276	42.88%	13,038	2.15%	2,608	0.43%	70,816	11.67%	607,014
Pike	1,649	46.36%	1,844	51.84%	57	1.60%	7	0.20%	-195	-5.48%	3,557
Potter	3,847	58.53%	2,271	34.55%	384	5.84%	71	1.08%	1,576	23.98%	6,573
Schuylkill	32,492	46.88%	35,023	50.53%	1,405	2.03%	385	0.56%	-2,531	-3.65%	69,305
Snyder	3,423	59.37%	2,176	37.74%	97	1.68%	70	1.21%	1,247	21.63%	5,766
Somerset	11,857	58.56%	7,919	39.11%	339	1.67%	134	0.66%	3,938	19.45%	20,249
Sullivan	1,457	46.77%	1,602	51.42%	35	1.12%	21	0.67%	-145	-4.65%	3,115
Susquehanna	6,884	55.99%	5,171	42.06%	168	1.37%	72	0.59%	1,713	13.93%	12,295
Tioga	9,583	75.00%	3,004	23.51%	119	0.93%	72	0.56%	6,579	51.49%	12,778
Union	3,534	61.63%	1,948	33.97%	187	3.26%	65	1.13%	1,586	27.66%	5,734
Venango	12,230	64.07%	6,174	32.34%	308	1.61%	376	1.97%	6,056	31.73%	19,088
Warren	7,872	57.24%	5,254	38.20%	476	3.46%	151	1.10%	2,618	19.04%	13,753
Washington	21,447	40.82%	28,934	55.07%	1,556	2.96%	599	1.14%	-7,487	-14.25%	52,536
Wayne	6,215	61.47%	3,666	36.26%	160	1.58%	70	0.69%	2,549	25.21%	10,111
Westmoreland	30,426	37.73%	45,436	56.34%	3,988	4.94%	801	0.99%	-15,010	-18.61%	80,651
Wyoming	3,968	58.00%	2,728	39.88%	84	1.23%	61	0.89%	1,240	18.13%	6,841
York	25,430	44.33%	29,313	51.10%	1,549	2.70%	1,073	1.87%	-3,883	-6.77%	57,365
Totals	1,464,533	51.24%	1,284,235	44.93%	91,223	3.19%	18,256	0.64%	180,298	6.31%	2,858,247

==== Counties that flipped from Republican to Democratic ====
- Adams
- Allegheny
- Beaver
- Berks
- Cambria
- Clarion
- Clearfield
- Columbia
- Erie
- Fayette
- Fulton
- Greene
- Juniata
- Lehigh
- Monroe
- Montour
- Northumberland
- Northampton
- Pike
- Schuylkill
- Sullivan
- Washington
- Westmoreland
- York

== See also ==
- United States presidential elections in Pennsylvania
