= 2004 United States presidential election in Delaware =

- November 2, 2004

Nominee	John Kerry	George W. Bush
Party	Democratic	Republican
Home state	Massachusetts	Texas
Running mate	John Edwards	Dick Cheney
Electoral vote	3	0
Popular vote	200,152	171,660
Percentage	53.35%	45.75%

Kerry
50–60%
60–70%
70–80%
80–90%
Bush
50–60%
60–70%
President before election
George W. Bush
Republican
Elected President
George W. Bush
Republican

The 2004 United States presidential election in Delaware took place on November 2, 2004, and was part of the 2004 United States presidential election. Voters chose three representatives, or electors to the Electoral College, who voted for president and vice president.

Delaware was won by Democratic nominee John Kerry by a 7.6% margin of victory. Prior to the election, all 12 news organizations handicapping the election predicted that Kerry would win Delaware, though with varying degrees of confidence; the First State was a key bellwether for much of the 20th century, but Al Gore's comfortable victory four years earlier amidst a national loss marked its move towards the Democratic Party. Kerry won Delaware without either campaign seriously contesting it, but with a 5.5% swing to Bush compared to Gore's performance in 2000. The swing was largely concentrated in Kent and Sussex Counties, in which Bush's margins increased by double digits; New Castle County, the state's most populous, only swung about a point to Bush, continuing its consolidation as the state's Democratic base.

As of 2024, this is the last election in which Delaware was decided by a single-digit margin, and the first time since 1948 that Delaware has not backed the national popular vote winner. Bush became the first Republican since 1880 to win the popular vote without Delaware, and the last to win 60% of the vote in any county in the state (namely Sussex). Bush was the first Republican since Abraham Lincoln to win two terms without ever carrying the state.

== Primaries ==
- 2004 Delaware Democratic presidential primary

== Campaign ==
=== Predictions ===
There were 12 news organizations who made state-by-state predictions of the election. Here are their last predictions before election day.

Source	Ranking
D.C. Political Report	Likely D
Associated Press	Solid D
CNN	Likely D
Cook Political Report	Likely D
Newsweek	Lean D
The New York Times	Lean D
Rasmussen Reports	Likely D
Research 2000	Solid D
The Washington Post	Likely D
Washington Times	Solid D
Zogby International	Likely D
Washington Dispatch	Likely D

=== Polling ===
Only two polls of the state were taken before the election, both of which Kerry won.

=== Fundraising ===
Bush raised $523,150. Kerry raised $260,657.

=== Advertising and visits ===
Neither campaign advertised or visited this state during the fall campaign.

== Results ==
2004 United States presidential election in Delaware
Party	Candidate	Running mate	Votes	Percentage	Electoral votes
Democratic	John Kerry	John Edwards	200,152	53.35%	3
Republican	George W. Bush (Inc.)	Dick Cheney (incumbent)	171,660	45.75%	0
Independent	Ralph Nader	Peter Camejo	2,153	0.57%	0
Libertarian	Michael Badnarik	Wayne Allyn Root	586	0.16%	0
Constitution	Chuck Baldwin	Michael Peroutka	289	0.08%	0
Green	David Cobb	Rosa Clemente	250	0.07%	0
Natural Law	Walt Brown	Mary Alice Herbert	100	0.03%	0
Totals			375,190	100.00%	3
Voter turnout (Voting Age population)					60.6%

=== By county ===
County	John Kerry Democratic		George W. Bush Republican		Various candidates Other parties		Margin		Total votes cast
County	#	%	#	%	#	%	#	%	Total votes cast
Kent	23,875	42.64%	31,578	56.40%	538	0.96%	-7,703	-13.76%	55,991
New Castle	146,179	60.52%	93,079	38.54%	2,269	0.94%	53,100	21.98%	241,527
Sussex	30,098	38.71%	47,003	60.45%	651	0.83%	-16,905	-21.74%	77,752
Totals	200,152	53.34%	171,660	45.74%	3,458	0.92%	28,492	7.60%	375,270

=== By congressional district ===
Due to the state's low population, only one congressional district is allocated. This district, called the at-large district, because it covers the entire state, and thus is equivalent to the statewide election results.

District	Bush	Kerry	Representative
At-large	45.8%	53.4%	Mike Castle

== Electors ==
Technically the voters of Delaware cast their ballots for electors: representatives to the Electoral College. Delaware is allocated three electors because it has one congressional district and two senators. All candidates who appear on the ballot or qualify to receive write-in votes must submit a list of three electors, who pledge to vote for their candidate and their running mate. Whoever wins the majority of votes in the state is awarded all three electoral votes. Their chosen electors then vote for president and vice president. Although electors are pledged to their candidate and running mate, they are not obligated to vote for them. An elector who votes for someone other than their candidate is known as a faithless elector.

The electors of each state and the District of Columbia met on December 13, 2004, to cast their votes for president and vice president. The Electoral College itself never meets as one body. Instead the electors from each state and the District of Columbia met in their respective capitols.

The following were the members of the Electoral College from Delaware. All were pledged to and voted for John Kerry and John Edwards:

1. James Johnson
2. Nancy W. Cook
3. Timothy G. Willard

== See also ==
- United States presidential elections in Delaware
