= 1896 United States presidential election in Delaware =

- November 3, 1896

Nominee	William McKinley	William Jennings Bryan
Party	Republican	Democratic
Home state	Ohio	Nebraska
Running mate	Garret Hobart	Arthur Sewall
Electoral vote	3	0
Popular vote	16,883	13,425
Percentage	53.53%	42.57%
County results
McKinley
50–60%
President before election
Grover Cleveland
Democratic
Elected President
William McKinley
Republican

The 1896 United States presidential election in Delaware took place on November 3, 1896. All contemporary 45 states were part of the 1896 United States presidential election. State voters chose three electors to the Electoral College, which selected the president and vice president.

Delaware was won by the Republican nominees, former Ohio Governor William McKinley and his running mate Garret Hobart of New Jersey. They defeated the Democratic nominee, former U.S. Representative from Nebraska William Jennings Bryan and his running mate Arthur Sewall. McKinley won the state by a (official) margin of 10.96%.

As a result of his win in Delaware, McKinley became the first Republican presidential candidate since Ulysses S. Grant in 1872 to win the state.

Bryan would lose Delaware to McKinley again four years later and would later lose the state again in 1908 to William Howard Taft.

== Results ==
General Election Results (Note: The election returns in Kent County were disputed and not included in the state's official canvass.)
Party	Pledged to	Elector	Votes
Republican Party	William McKinley	James G. Shaw	16,883
Republican Party	William McKinley	Daniel F. Fooks	16,805
Republican Party	William McKinley	Daniel M. Wilson	16,789
Democratic Party	William Jennings Bryan	John Harrington	13,425
Democratic Party	William Jennings Bryan	John H. Rodney	13,417
Democratic Party	William Jennings Bryan	Paynter Frame	13,327
Honest Money Democrat	John M. Palmer	Levi A. Bertolette	877
Honest Money Democrat	John M. Palmer	Charles C. Stockley	867
Honest Money Democrat	John M. Palmer	Edward Ridgely	858
Prohibition Party	Joshua Levering	William W. Vincent	353
Prohibition Party	Joshua Levering	Jefferson Cooper	352
Prohibition Party	Joshua Levering	Henry M. Silver	351
Votes cast (Note: Based on highest elector on each ticket)			31,538

=== Results by county ===
County	William McKinley Republican		William Jennings Bryan Democratic		John M. Palmer Honest Money		Joshua Levering Prohibition		Margin		Total votes cast
County	#	%	#	%	#	%	#	%	#	%	Total votes cast
Kent (Note: The results were disputed in Kent County due to the rejection of the returns from several hundreds in the county. Ultimately, the state did not count any results from the county when canvassing the full vote. These results are therefore unofficial.)	3,567	51.55%	3,149	45.51%	90	1.30%	113	1.63%	418	6.04%	6,919
New Castle	12,344	53.70%	9,632	41.90%	778	3.38%	233	1.01%	2,712	11.80%	22,987
Sussex	4,539	53.08%	3,793	44.36%	99	1.16%	120	1.40%	746	8.72%	8,551
Totals (Note: Does not include the disputed votes in Kent County)	16,883	53.53%	13,425	42.57%	877	2.78%	353	1.12%	3,458	10.96%	31,538

==== Counties that flipped from Democratic to Republican ====
- Kent
- New Castle
- Sussex

== See also ==
- United States presidential elections in Delaware
