= 1916 United States presidential election in Delaware =

- November 7, 1916
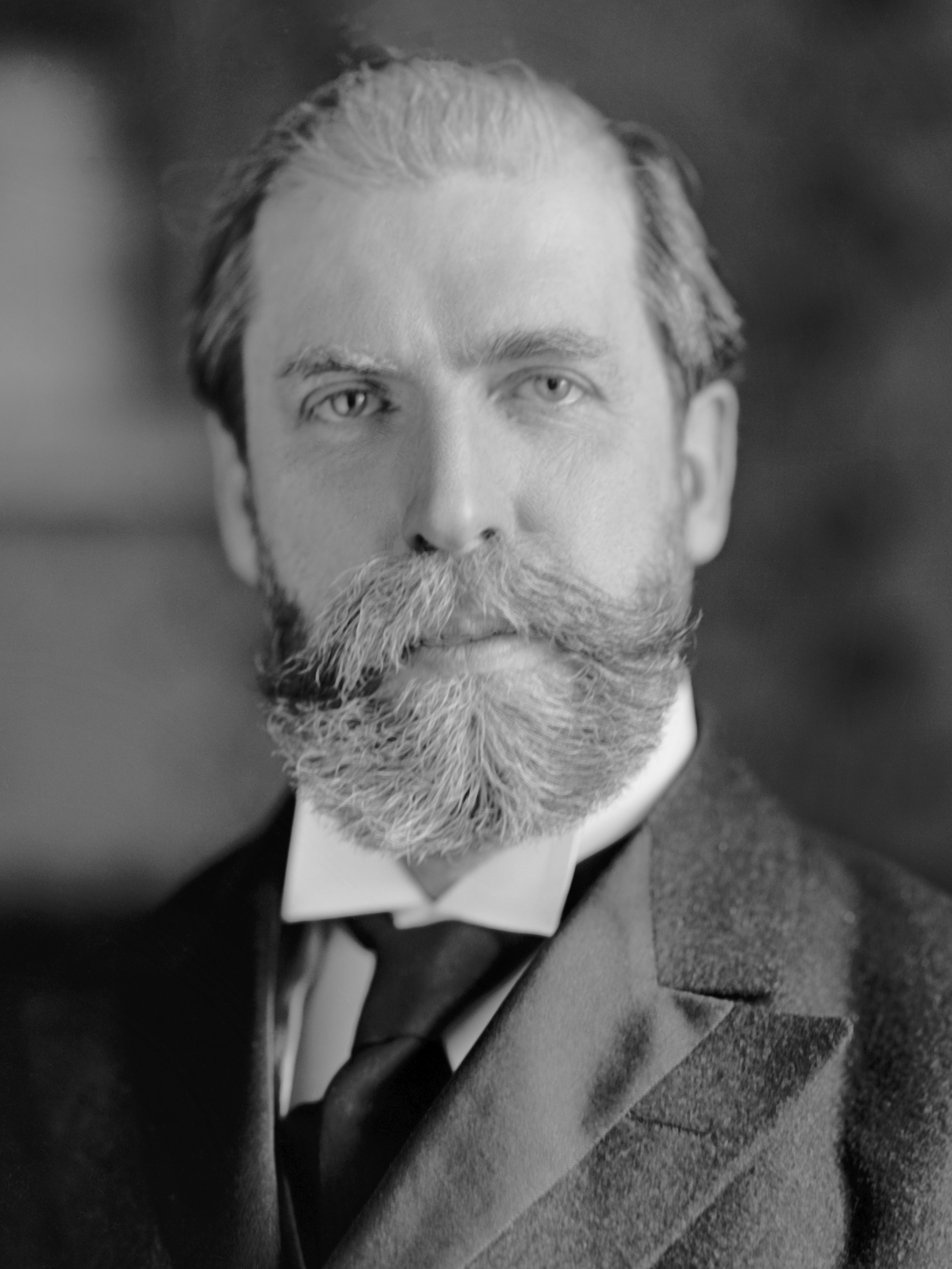

Nominee	Charles Evans Hughes	Woodrow Wilson
Party	Republican	Democratic
Home state	New York	New Jersey
Running mate	Charles W. Fairbanks	Thomas R. Marshall
Electoral vote	3	0
Popular vote	26,011	24,753
Percentage	50.20%	47.78%
County results
Hughes
50–60%
Wilson
50–60%
President before election
Woodrow Wilson
Democratic
Elected President
Woodrow Wilson
Democratic

The 1916 United States presidential election in Delaware took place on November 7, 1916. All 48 contemporary states participated in the 1916 United States presidential election. Voters chose three electors to the Electoral College, which selected the president and vice president.

Republican nominee and Supreme Court justice Charles Evans Hughes carried Delaware with 50.20% of the vote, defeating Democratic nominee and incumbent president Woodrow Wilson, who won 47.78% of the vote. This election marks one of three times in the 20th century that the state voted for the losing candidate, along with 1932 and 1948.

Wilson was the first Democrat to win the presidency without Delaware since James K. Polk in 1844, and Hughes the first Republican to ever carry Delaware without winning the presidency.

== Results ==
General Election Results
Party	Pledged to	Elector	Votes
Republican Party	Charles Evans Hughes	William H. Heald	26,011
Republican Party	Charles Evans Hughes	William D. Denney	25,750
Republican Party	Charles Evans Hughes	William I. Simpson	25,749
Democratic Party	Woodrow Wilson	Patrick H. Keaveny	24,753
Democratic Party	Woodrow Wilson	Joseph Hermon Anderson	24,463
Democratic Party	Woodrow Wilson	Oliver Cordrey	24,450
Prohibition Party	Frank Hanly	Thomas J. Biscoe	566
Prohibition Party	Frank Hanly	Alfred Smith	555
Prohibition Party	Frank Hanly	Edward J. Winder	552
Socialist Party	Allan L. Benson	Clarence W. Johnson	480
Socialist Party	Allan L. Benson	Arthur N. Andrews	480
Socialist Party	Allan L. Benson	Paul Schueler	480
Votes cast (Note: Based on highest elector on each ticket)			51,810

=== Results by county ===
County	Charles Evans Hughes Republican		Woodrow Wilson Democratic		Frank Hanly Prohibition		Allan L. Benson Socialist		Margin		Total votes cast
County	#	%	#	%	#	%	#	%	#	%	Total votes cast
Kent	3,813	47.14%	4,210	52.05%	66	0.82%	0	0.00%	-397	-4.91%	8,089
New Castle	16,166	50.56%	14,894	46.58%	436	1.36%	480	1.50%	1,272	3.98%	31,976
Sussex	6,032	51.36%	5,649	48.10%	64	0.54%	0	0.00%	383	3.26%	11,745
Totals	26,011	50.20%	24,753	47.78%	566	1.09%	480	0.93%	1,258	2.43%	51,810

==== Counties that flipped from Democratic to Republican ====
- New Castle
- Sussex

== See also ==
- United States presidential elections in Delaware
