= 1932 United States presidential election in New Hampshire =

- November 8, 1932

Nominee	Herbert Hoover	Franklin D. Roosevelt
Party	Republican	Democratic
Home state	California	New York
Running mate	Charles Curtis	John Nance Garner
Electoral vote	4	0
Popular vote	103,629	100,680
Percentage	50.42%	48.99%

Hoover
50–60%
60–70%
70–80%
80–90%
90–100%
Roosevelt
40–50%
50–60%
60–70%
70–80%
80–90%
90–100%
Tie
50%
President before election
Herbert Hoover
Republican
Elected President
Franklin D. Roosevelt
Democratic

The 1932 United States presidential election in New Hampshire took place on November 8, 1932, as part of the 1932 United States presidential election which was held throughout all contemporary 48 states. Voters chose four representatives, or electors, to the Electoral College, who voted for president and vice president.

New Hampshire voted for the Republican nominee, incumbent President Herbert Hoover of California, over the Democratic nominee, Governor Franklin D. Roosevelt of New York. Hoover's running mate was incumbent Vice President Charles Curtis of Kansas, while Roosevelt ran with incumbent Speaker of the House John Nance Garner of Texas.

Hoover won New Hampshire by a narrow margin of 1.43%. With 50.42% of the popular vote, it was Hoover's fifth strongest state in the nation behind Vermont, Maine, Pennsylvania and Delaware.

New Hampshire was one of only six states (the other five being Connecticut, Delaware, Maine, Pennsylvania, and Vermont), four of them in New England, which voted to re-elect the embattled Republican incumbent Hoover, who was widely unpopular over his failure to adequately address the Great Depression. The state voted for the losing candidate for the first time since 1892, something it would do only six times since: in 1948, 1960, 1976, 2004, 2016, and 2024.

== Results ==
1932 United States presidential election in New Hampshire
Party	Candidate	Running mate	Popular vote		Electoral vote	
Party	Candidate	Running mate	Count	%	Count	%
Republican	Herbert Hoover of California (incumbent)	Charles Curtis of Kansas (incumbent)	103,629	50.42%	4	100.00%
Democratic	Franklin Delano Roosevelt of New York	John Nance Garner of Texas	100,680	48.99%	0	0.00%
Socialist	Norman Thomas of New York	James Hudson Maurer of Pennsylvania	947	0.24%	0	0.00%
Communist	William Z. Foster of Massachusetts	James W. Ford of Alabama	264	0.09%	0	0.00%
Total			205,520	100.00%	4	100.00%

=== Results by county ===
County	Herbert Hoover Republican		Franklin Roosevelt Democratic		Norman Thomas Socialist		William Foster Communist		Margin		Total votes cast
County	#	%	#	%	#	%	#	%	#	%	Total votes cast
Belknap	6,048	55.04%	4,911	44.69%	26	0.24%	3	0.03%	1,137	10.35%	10,988
Carroll	5,269	64.56%	2,873	35.20%	16	0.20%	3	0.04%	2,396	29.36%	8,161
Cheshire	7,904	57.73%	5,662	41.35%	115	0.84%	11	0.08%	2,242	16.37%	13,692
Coös	7,189	47.28%	7,928	52.14%	74	0.49%	14	0.09%	-739	-4.86%	15,205
Grafton	10,810	55.94%	8,342	43.17%	159	0.82%	12	0.06%	2,468	12.77%	19,323
Hillsborough	23,308	41.50%	32,458	57.79%	267	0.48%	128	0.23%	-9,150	-16.29%	56,161
Merrimack	13,986	51.98%	12,805	47.59%	82	0.30%	35	0.13%	1,181	4.39%	26,908
Rockingham	14,902	56.44%	11,363	43.03%	113	0.43%	27	0.10%	3,539	13.40%	26,405
Strafford	9,060	47.44%	9,970	52.20%	57	0.30%	11	0.06%	-910	-4.76%	19,098
Sullivan	5,153	53.79%	4,368	45.60%	38	0.40%	20	0.21%	785	8.20%	9,579
Totals	103,629	50.42%	100,680	48.99%	947	0.46%	264	0.13%	2,949	1.43%	205,520

==== Counties that flipped from Republican to Democratic ====
- Coös
- Strafford

== See also ==
- United States presidential elections in New Hampshire
