= Pencader Charter High School =

Coordinates: 39.6779°N 75.5457°W

- New Castle, Delaware; USA

Information
- Type: Public (charter) secondary
- Motto: "Where the Serious Student Achieves Success!"
- Established: 2005
- Closed: 2013
- School district: N/A
- Principal: Steve Quimby
- Grades: 9–12
- Enrollment: 411
- Campus: Office
- Colors: Red and White
- Mascot: The Titan
- Athletics: Football, Soccer, Basketball, Lacrosse, Swimming, Tennis
- Website: PencaderCharter.org

The Pencader Charter High School of Business & Finance was a high school in New Castle, Delaware that opened in August 2006. It opened with 350 students (200 freshman, 150 sophomores) and was the first high school in Delaware with a business and finance focus. The plan was to enroll 200 students each year thereafter and achieve a student population of 800 by the Fall of 2009. As of 2012, it had approximately 410 students. It had two nearly identical buildings overlooking the Delaware River.

It shared many of the same characteristics as The Charter School of Wilmington including a required yearly commitment, a selective admissions process, a block schedule, free bus transportation, no tuition, and a dress code including khakis and Pencader polo shirts, button-down long sleeve or short sleeve, sweater vest, or sweater.

Pencader Charter was known on a state level through its involvement with athletics, and extracurricular groups.

== Financial troubles & closure ==
The school had difficulty working with its $5 million annual budget, leading to it having been at risk of closure in 2011, 2012 and again in 2013.

The school's charter was revoked and the school closed at the end of school year in June 2013. All of the members of the Delaware State Board of Education voted to terminate the charter, which meant closing the school.

== Notable alumni ==
- Jerome Smith, former NFL football player
