= Statewide opinion polling for the 2016 United States presidential election =

2016 United States presidential election polling
- November 8, 2016

Leading presidential 2016 candidate by electoral vote count. States in gray have no polling data. Polls from lightly shaded states are older than September 1, 2016. This map only represents the most recent statewide polling data; it is not a prediction for the 2016 election.
Hillary Clinton	216
Donald Trump	184^{*}
Margin of error between Clinton and Trump	134^{*}
No data	4
^{*}No margin of error recorded for Nebraska's congressional districts. Maine and Nebraska both award 1 electoral vote per congressional district and 2 statewide electoral votes. Trump leads in Nebraska's 1st and 3rd congressional districts, while Clinton leads in Maine's 1st congressional district. Nebraska's 2nd congressional district could possibly be within the margin of error and Maine's 2nd congressional district is within the margin of error.
(270 electoral votes needed to win)
President before election
Barack Obama
Democratic
Elected President
Donald Trump
Republican

Statewide polls for the 2016 United States presidential election include the following. The polls listed here provide early data on opinion polling between the Democratic candidate, the Republican candidate, the Libertarian candidate, and the Green candidate. Prior to the parties' conventions, presumptive candidates were included in the polls. State polling is not conducted in all states for the election due to various factors. More polls usually are conducted in states that are considered swing states as more attention is given to the results. For determining a statistical tie, the margin of error provided by the polling source is applied to the result for each candidate.

== Most recent polling ==
Immediately before the election, Hillary Clinton had a vote lead among states recently polled. State polls with results outside the margin of error showed 213 potential electoral votes for Clinton and 162 potential electoral votes for Donald Trump. In 14 states and two congressional districts (150 electoral votes), results for Clinton and Trump were within the margin of error. For the two states and one district without recent polling, one state (6 electoral votes) voted for Mitt Romney in the 2012 election, while one state and district (7 electoral votes) voted for Barack Obama. Third-party candidates, such as Jill Stein and Gary Johnson, were also included in many statewide polls. They have not received support in statewide polling that surpasses the two main party nominees. Independent candidate Evan McMullin was tied with Donald Trump in the state of Utah, but he has only been included on a very limited number of statewide polls.

State	Date	Hillary Clinton	Donald Trump	Gary Johnson	Jill Stein	Evan McMullin	Margin of error	Lead	Clinton potential EVs	Trump potential EVs	Tied potential EVs	Result
Nationwide (Note: These results reflect only polls done on or after September 1, 2016.)	National polling								213	178	134	
Alabama	September 27, 2016	32%	48%				2.0%	16		9		25.8
Alaska	October 21–26, 2016	47%	43%	7%	3%		4.9%	4			3	14.7
Arizona	November 4–6, 2016	45%	47%	5%	2%		4.9%	2			11	3.5
Arkansas	October 18–25, 2016	36%	59%				4.1%	23		6		26.9
California	November 4–6, 2016	58%	35%	3%	2%		4.9%	28	55			30.1
Colorado	November 3–4, 2016	48%	43%	4%	2%	1%	3.7%	5			9	4.9
Connecticut	September 2–5, 2016	50%	35%	9%	4%		3.0%	15	7			13.6
Delaware	September 16–28, 2016	51%	30%	7%	2%		4.1%	21	3			11.4
Florida	November 6, 2016	46%	50%	2%	1%		3.3%	4			29	1.2
Georgia	November 6, 2016	45%	52%	2%			2.8%	7		16		5.1
Idaho	October 23–24, 2016	29%	48%	6%		10%	4.0%	19		4		31.8
Illinois	October 27–30, 2016	53%	41%	2%	0%		4.3%	12	20			17.1
Indiana	November 1–3, 2016	37%	48%	9%			4.0%	11		11		18.9
Iowa	November 1–4, 2016	39%	46%	6%	1%		3.5%	7			6	9.4
Kansas	November 1–3, 2016	34%	58%				5.5%	24		6		20.6
Kentucky	October 25–30, 2016	37%	54%	1%	1%	1%	4.0%	17		8		29.8
Louisiana	October 19–21, 2016	35%	50%	5%			4.4%	15		8		19.6
Maine	October 28–30, 2016	46%	42%	12%	2%		3.5%	4	1		3	3
Maryland	September 27–30, 2016	63%	27%	4%	2%		4.0%	36	10			26.4
Massachusetts	October 23 – November 2, 2016	56%	26%	8%	3%		5.0%	30	11			27.2
Michigan	November 6, 2016	47%	49%	3%	1%		2.8%	2			16	0.2
Minnesota	October 22–26, 2016	49%	39%	5%	2%	1%	3.9%	10	10			1.5
Missouri	November 4–5, 2016	41%	47%	7%	2%		3.5%	6			10	18.6
Montana	October 10–12, 2016	36%	46%	11%			3.2%	10		3		20.4
Nebraska	September 25–27, 2016	29%	56%	7%	1%		3.6%	27		4	1	25
Nevada	November 4–6, 2016	46%	46%	5%	1%		4.9%	Tied			6	2.4
New Hampshire	November 3–6, 2016	49%	38%	6%	1%		3.7%	11	4			0.4
New Jersey	October 27 – November 2, 2016	51%	40%	3%	1%		3.8%	11	14			14.2
New Mexico	November 6, 2016	46%	44%	6%	1%		1.8%	2			5	8.2
New York	November 3–4, 2016	51%	34%	5%	2%		4.5%	17	29			22.5
North Carolina	November 4–6, 2016	44%	44%	3%			3.5%	Tied			15	3.6
North Dakota	September 12–17, 2016	32%	43%	8%	1%		4.9%	11		3		35.7
Ohio	October 27 – November 5, 2016	39%	46%	7%	3%		3.2%	7		18		8.1
Oklahoma	October 18–20, 2016	30%	60%	5%			4.3%	30		7		36.4
Oregon	October 24–29, 2016	41%	34%	4%	2%		4.4%	7			7	11
Pennsylvania	November 3–6, 2016	46%	40%	7%	2%		2.8%	6	20			0.7
Rhode Island	October 2–4, 2016	52%	32%	5%	5%		3.4%	20	4			18.5
South Carolina	October 30–31, 2016	36%	47%	3%	1%		4.4%	11		9		14.7
South Dakota	October 24–26, 2016	35%	49%	7%			4.0%	14		3		29.8
Tennessee	October 14–17, 2016	34%	44%	7%	2%		4.4%	10		11		26
Texas	October 31 – November 1, 2016	35%	49%	5%	4%		3.6%	14		38		9
Utah	November 3–5, 2016	30%	40%	4%		25%	2.7%	10		6		18.1
Vermont	October 24–26, 2016	52%	26%	5%	2%		3.0%	26	3			26.4
Virginia	November 1–6, 2016	48%	42%	3%	1%	2%	3.6%	6			13	5.3
Washington	November 4–6, 2016	55%	39%				4.9%	16	12			16.2
West Virginia	September 13–17, 2016	28%	60%				5.0%	32		5		42.2
Wisconsin	November 1–2, 2016	49%	41%	3%			1.9%	8	10			0.8
Wyoming	October 5–11, 2016	20%	58%	9%	2%		3.6%	38		3		46.3
No recent polling									13			

== Alabama ==
9 electoral votes
(Republican in 2008) 60%–39%
(Republican in 2012) 61%–38%

Winner
(Republican in 2016) 62%–34%

Poll source	Date administered	Democrat	%	Republican	%	Lead margin	Sample size	Margin of error
News-5/Strategy Research	September 27, 2016	Hillary Clinton	32%	Donald Trump	48%	16	3,000	± 2.0%

== Alaska ==
3 electoral votes
(Republican in 2008) 59%–38%
(Republican in 2012) 55%–41%

Winner
(Republican in 2016) 51%–37%

Two-way race

Poll source	Date administered	Democrat	%	Republican	%	Lead margin	Sample size	Margin of error
Alaska Survey Research	September 28 – October 2, 2016	Hillary Clinton	42%	Donald Trump	46%	4	660	± 3.8%

Four-way race

Poll source	Date administered	Democrat	%	Republican	%	Libertarian	%	Green	%	Lead margin	Sample size	Margin of error
Carciun Research	October 21–26, 2016	Hillary Clinton	47%	Donald Trump	43%	Gary Johnson	7%	Jill Stein	3%	4	400	± 4.9%
Lake Research Partners	October 11–13, 2016	Hillary Clinton	36%	Donald Trump	37%	Gary Johnson	7%	Jill Stein	3%	1	500	± 4.4%
Moore Information	October 5–6, 2016	Hillary Clinton	34%	Donald Trump	37%	Gary Johnson	10%	Jill Stein	2%	3	500	± 4%
Alaska Survey Research	September 28 – October 2, 2016	Hillary Clinton	31%	Donald Trump	36%	Gary Johnson	18%	Jill Stein	6%	5	660	± 3.8%

== Arizona ==
11 electoral votes
(Republican in 2008) 53%–45%
(Republican in 2012) 53%–44%

Winner
(Republican in 2016) 48%–45%

Two-way race

Poll source	Date administered	Democrat	%	Republican	%	Lead margin	Sample size	Margin of error
NBC News/Wall Street Journal/Marist	October 30 – November 1, 2016	Hillary Clinton	41%	Donald Trump	46%	5	719	± 3.7%
CNN/ORC	October 27 – November 1, 2016	Hillary Clinton	46%	Donald Trump	51%	5	769	± 3.5%
Ipsos/Reuters	October 6–18, 2016	Hillary Clinton	38%	Donald Trump	45%	7	1,538	± 2.8%
NBC News/Wall Street Journal/Marist	September 6–8, 2016	Hillary Clinton	41%	Donald Trump	42%	1	649	± 3.8%

Three-way race

Poll source	Date administered	Democrat	%	Republican	%	Libertarian	%	Lead margin	Sample size	Margin of error
Data Orbital	October 11–12, 2016	Hillary Clinton	43%	Donald Trump	42%	Gary Johnson	5%	1	550	± 4.12%
Data Orbital	September 20–22, 2016	Hillary Clinton	38%	Donald Trump	40%	Gary Johnson	9%	2	550	± 4.12%

Four-way race

Poll source	Date administered	Democrat	%	Republican	%	Libertarian	%	Green	%	Lead margin	Sample size	Margin of error
Insights West	November 4–6, 2016	Hillary Clinton	45%	Donald Trump	47%	Gary Johnson	5%	Jill Stein	2%	2	392	± 4.9%
Data Orbital	November 1–2, 2016	Hillary Clinton	39%	Donald Trump	47%	Gary Johnson	4%	Jill Stein	3%	8	550	± 4.12%
NBC News/Wall Street Journal/Marist	October 30 – November 1, 2016	Hillary Clinton	40%	Donald Trump	45%	Gary Johnson	9%	Jill Stein	3%	5	719	± 3.7%
CNN/ORC	October 27 – November 1, 2016	Hillary Clinton	44%	Donald Trump	49%	Gary Johnson	5%	Jill Stein	1%	5	769	± 3.5%
Saguaro Strategies	October 29–31, 2016	Hillary Clinton	45%	Donald Trump	44%	Gary Johnson	7%	Jill Stein	1%	1	2,229	± 3%
Emerson College	October 29–31, 2016	Hillary Clinton	43%	Donald Trump	47%	Gary Johnson	2%	Jill Stein	2%	4	700	± 3.6%
Data Orbital	October 29–30, 2016	Hillary Clinton	41%	Donald Trump	45%	Gary Johnson	3%	Jill Stein	1%	4	550	± 4.12%
CBS News/YouGov	October 26–28, 2016	Hillary Clinton	42%	Donald Trump	44%	Gary Johnson	4%	Jill Stein	1%	2	994	± 4.3%
Data Orbital	October 26–27, 2016	Hillary Clinton	40%	Donald Trump	42%	Gary Johnson	5%	Jill Stein	2%	2	550	± 4.12%
Saguaro Strategies	October 21–24, 2016	Hillary Clinton	48%	Donald Trump	46%	Gary Johnson	5%	Jill Stein	1%	2	2,385	± 3%
Monmouth University	October 21–24, 2016	Hillary Clinton	45%	Donald Trump	46%	Gary Johnson	4%	Jill Stein	1%	1	401	± 4.9%
Data Orbital	October 17–18, 2016	Hillary Clinton	41%	Donald Trump	41%	Gary Johnson	5%	Jill Stein	2%	Tied	550	± 4.12%
Ipsos/Reuters	October 6–18, 2016	Hillary Clinton	39%	Donald Trump	44%	Gary Johnson	6%	Jill Stein	2%	5	1,538	± 2.8%
Arizona Republic/Morrison/Cronkite News	October 10–15, 2016	Hillary Clinton	43%	Donald Trump	38%	Gary Johnson	6%	Jill Stein	1%	5	713	± 3.8%
Highground	October 14, 2016	Hillary Clinton	39%	Donald Trump	37%	Gary Johnson	8%	Jill Stein	3%	2	400	±4.88%
Emerson College	October 2–4, 2016	Hillary Clinton	44%	Donald Trump	42%	Gary Johnson	9%	Jill Stein	1%	2	600	±3.90%
OH Predictive Insights	September 28–30, 2016	Hillary Clinton	42%	Donald Trump	42%	Gary Johnson	5%	Jill Stein	1%	Tied	718	±3.66%
Insights West	September 12–14, 2016	Hillary Clinton	41%	Donald Trump	46%	Gary Johnson	9%	Jill Stein	1%	5	484	± 4.5%
NBC News/Wall Street Journal/Marist	September 6–8, 2016	Hillary Clinton	38%	Donald Trump	40%	Gary Johnson	12%	Jill Stein	3%	2	649	± 3.8%

== Arkansas ==
6 electoral votes
(Republican in 2008) 59%–39%
(Republican in 2012) 61%–37%

Winner
(Republican in 2016) 61%–34%

Two-way race

Poll source	Date administered	Democrat	%	Republican	%	Lead margin	Sample size	Margin of error
University of Arkansas	October 18–25, 2016	Hillary Clinton	36%	Donald Trump	59%	23	800	± 4.1%

Four-way race

Poll source	Date administered	Democrat	%	Republican	%	Libertarian	%	Green	%	Lead margin	Sample size	Margin of error
Talk Business/Hendrix College	October 21, 2016	Hillary Clinton	33%	Donald Trump	56%	Gary Johnson	4%	Jill Stein	2%	23	463	± 4.6%
Talk Business/Hendrix College	September 15–17, 2016	Hillary Clinton	34%	Donald Trump	55%	Gary Johnson	3%	Jill Stein	1%	21	831	± 3.4%
Emerson College	September 9–13, 2016	Hillary Clinton	29%	Donald Trump	57%	Gary Johnson	5%	Jill Stein	3%	28	600	± 3.9%

== California ==
55 electoral votes
(Democratic in 2008) 61%–37%
(Democratic in 2012) 60%–37%

Winner
(Democratic in 2016) 62%–32%

Two-way race

Poll source	Date administered	Democrat	%	Republican	%	Lead margin	Sample size	Margin of error
USC Dornsife/Los Angeles Times	October 22–30, 2016	Hillary Clinton	58%	Donald Trump	32%	26	1,365	± 2.3%
USC Dornsife/Los Angeles Times	September 1–8, 2016	Hillary Clinton	58%	Donald Trump	33%	25	4,212	± 2.0%

Four-way race

Poll source	Date administered	Democrat	%	Republican	%	Libertarian	%	Green	%	Lead margin	Sample size	Margin of error
Insights West	November 4–6, 2016	Hillary Clinton	58%	Donald Trump	35%	Gary Johnson	3%	Jill Stein	2%	23	401	± 4.9%
KABC/SurveyUSA	October 28–31, 2016	Hillary Clinton	56%	Donald Trump	35%	Gary Johnson	4%	Jill Stein	1%	21	747	± 3.6%
USC Dornsife/Los Angeles Times	October 22–30, 2016	Hillary Clinton	54%	Donald Trump	30%	Gary Johnson	4%	Jill Stein	3%	26	1,365	± 2.3%
Field Research	October 25–31, 2016	Hillary Clinton	53%	Donald Trump	33%	Gary Johnson	4%	Jill Stein	3%	20	1,498	±%
Public Policy Institute of California	October 14–23, 2016	Hillary Clinton	54%	Donald Trump	28%	Gary Johnson	5%	Jill Stein	5%	26	1,704	± 3.4%
KABC/SurveyUSA	October 13–15, 2016	Hillary Clinton	56%	Donald Trump	30%	Gary Johnson	4%	Jill Stein	2%	26	725	± 3.7%
Hoover Institution/YouGov	October 4–14, 2016	Hillary Clinton	54%	Donald Trump	30%	Gary Johnson	4%	Jill Stein	3%	24	1,250	± 3.28%
Sacramento State University	October 7–13, 2016	Hillary Clinton	61%	Donald Trump	25%	Gary Johnson	4%	Jill Stein	3%	36	622	± 7.0%
KABC/SurveyUSA	September 27–28, 2016	Hillary Clinton	59%	Donald Trump	33%	Gary Johnson	3%	Jill Stein	2%	26	732	± 3.6%
Public Policy Institute of California	September 9–18, 2016	Hillary Clinton	47%	Donald Trump	31%	Gary Johnson	10%	Jill Stein	5%	16	1,055	± 4.5%
Insights West	September 12–14, 2016	Hillary Clinton	62%	Donald Trump	34%	Gary Johnson	2%	Jill Stein	1%	28	515	± 4.3%
Field Research	September 7–13, 2016	Hillary Clinton	50%	Donald Trump	33%	Gary Johnson	5%	Jill Stein	6%	17	1,426	±%
SurveyUSA	September 8–11, 2016	Hillary Clinton	57%	Donald Trump	32%	Gary Johnson	3%	Jill Stein	1%	25	678	± 3.8%
USC Dornsife/Los Angeles Times	September 1–8, 2016	Hillary Clinton	49%	Donald Trump	29%	Gary Johnson	11%	Jill Stein	6%	20	4,212	± 2.0%

== Colorado ==
9 electoral votes
(Democratic in 2008) 54%–45%
(Democratic in 2012) 51%–46%

Winner
(Democratic in 2016) 48%–43%

Two-way race

Poll source	Date administered	Democrat	%	Republican	%	Lead margin	Sample size	Margin of error
Public Policy Polling	November 3–4, 2016	Hillary Clinton	50%	Donald Trump	45%	5	704	± 3.7%
University of Denver	October 29–31, 2016	Hillary Clinton	42%	Donald Trump	41%	1	550	± 4.2%
Quinnipiac University	October 10–16, 2016	Hillary Clinton	51%	Donald Trump	40%	11	685	± 3.7%
Public Policy Polling	September 27–28, 2016	Hillary Clinton	51%	Donald Trump	44%	7	694	± 3.7%
CNN/ORC	September 20–25, 2016	Hillary Clinton	49%	Donald Trump	47%	2	784	± 3.5%
Quinnipiac University	September 13–21, 2016	Hillary Clinton	47%	Donald Trump	47%	Tied	644	± 3.9%
Colorado Mesa University/Rocky Mountain PBS	September 14–18, 2016	Hillary Clinton	44%	Donald Trump	35%	9	540	± 5.3%

Three-way race

Poll source	Date administered	Democrat	%	Republican	%	Libertarian	%	Lead margin	Sample size	Margin of error
Remington Research Group/Axiom Strategies	November 1–2, 2016	Hillary Clinton	42%	Donald Trump	41%	Gary Johnson	6%	1	1,863	± 2.27%
Remington Research Group/Axiom Strategies	October 23–30, 2016	Hillary Clinton	45%	Donald Trump	44%	Gary Johnson	4%	1	952	± 3.17%
Remington Research Group/Axiom Strategies	October 20–22, 2016	Hillary Clinton	45%	Donald Trump	43%	Gary Johnson	5%	2	1,581	± 2.46%

Four-way race

Poll source	Date administered	Democrat	%	Republican	%	Libertarian	%	Green	%	Lead margin	Sample size	Margin of error
Trafalgar Group	October 31 – November 3, 2016	Hillary Clinton	45%	Donald Trump	44%	Gary Johnson	5%	Jill Stein	4%	1	1,150	± 3.20%
Magellan Strategies	November 1–2, 2016	Hillary Clinton	44%	Donald Trump	38%	Gary Johnson	7%	Jill Stein	2%	6	500	± 4.38%
University of Denver	October 29–31, 2016	Hillary Clinton	39%	Donald Trump	39%	Gary Johnson	5%	Jill Stein	4%	Tied	550	± 4.2%
Emerson College	October 28–31, 2016	Hillary Clinton	44%	Donald Trump	41%	Gary Johnson	8%	Jill Stein	4%	3	750	± 3.5%
Quinnipiac University	October 10–16, 2016	Hillary Clinton	45%	Donald Trump	37%	Gary Johnson	10%	Jill Stein	3%	8	685	± 3.7%
Monmouth University	September 29 – October 2, 2016	Hillary Clinton	49%	Donald Trump	38%	Gary Johnson	7%	Jill Stein	3%	11	400	± 4.9%
Keating Research	September 27–29, 2016	Hillary Clinton	44%	Donald Trump	33%	Gary Johnson	10%	Jill Stein	3%	11	602	± 4.0%
Public Policy Polling	September 27–28, 2016	Hillary Clinton	46%	Donald Trump	40%	Gary Johnson	6%	Jill Stein	2%	6	694	± 3.7%
CNN/ORC	September 20–25, 2016	Hillary Clinton	41%	Donald Trump	42%	Gary Johnson	13%	Jill Stein	3%	1	784	± 3.5%
CBS News/YouGov	September 21–23, 2016	Hillary Clinton	40%	Donald Trump	39%	Gary Johnson	7%	Jill Stein	2%	1	991	± 4.4%
Quinnipiac University	September 13–21, 2016	Hillary Clinton	44%	Donald Trump	42%	Gary Johnson	10%	Jill Stein	2%	2	644	± 3.9%
Colorado Mesa University/Rocky Mountain PBS	September 14–18, 2016	Hillary Clinton	41%	Donald Trump	34%	Gary Johnson	12%	Jill Stein	3%	7	540	± 5.3%
Emerson College	September 9–13, 2016	Hillary Clinton	38%	Donald Trump	42%	Gary Johnson	13%	Jill Stein	2%	4	600	± 3.9%

Five-way race

Poll source	Date administered	Democrat	%	Republican	%	Libertarian	%	Green	%	Independent	%	Lead margin	Sample size	Margin of error
Public Policy Polling	November 3–4, 2016	Hillary Clinton	48%	Donald Trump	43%	Gary Johnson	4%	Jill Stein	2%	Evan McMullin	1%	5	704	± 3.7%
Keating Research	November 2–3, 2016	Hillary Clinton	43%	Donald Trump	38%	Gary Johnson	7%	Jill Stein	2%	Evan McMullin	1%	5	605	± 4.0%
CBS News/YouGov	October 26–28, 2016	Hillary Clinton	42%	Donald Trump	39%	Gary Johnson	7%	Jill Stein	2%	Evan McMullin	1%	3	997	± 4.1%

== Connecticut ==
7 electoral votes
(Democratic in 2008) 61%–38%
(Democratic in 2012) 58%–41%

Winner
(Democratic in 2016) 55%–41%

Four-way race

Poll source	Date administered	Democrat	%	Republican	%	Libertarian	%	Green	%	Lead margin	Sample size	Margin of error
Emerson College	September 2–5, 2016	Hillary Clinton	50%	Donald Trump	35%	Gary Johnson	9%	Jill Stein	4%	15	1,000	± 3.0%

== Delaware ==
3 electoral votes
(Democratic in 2008) 62%–37%
(Democratic in 2012) 59%–40%

Winner
(Democratic in 2016) 53%-42%

Four-way race

Poll source	Date administered	Democrat	%	Republican	%	Libertarian	%	Green	%	Lead margin	Sample size	Margin of error
University of Delaware	September 16–28, 2016	Hillary Clinton	51%	Donald Trump	30%	Gary Johnson	7%	Jill Stein	2%	21	762	± 4.1%

== District of Columbia ==
3 electoral votes
(Democratic in 2008) 92%–7%
(Democratic in 2012) 91%–7%

Winner
(Democratic in 2016) 91%–4%

No polling was conducted post August 1, 2016

== Florida ==
29 electoral votes
(Democratic in 2008) 51%–48%
(Democratic in 2012) 50%–49%

Winner
(Republican in 2016) 49%–48%

== Georgia ==
16 electoral votes
(Republican in 2008) 52%–47%
(Republican in 2012) 53%–45%

Winner
(Republican in 2016) 51%–46%

Two-way race

Poll source	Date administered	Democrat	%	Republican	%	Lead margin	Sample size	Margin of error
NBC News/Wall Street Journal/Marist	October 30 – November 1, 2016	Hillary Clinton	46%	Donald Trump	47%	1	707	±3.7%
Quinnipiac University	October 20–26, 2016	Hillary Clinton	46%	Donald Trump	46%	Tied	707	± 3.7%
Quinnipiac University	September 13–21, 2016	Hillary Clinton	44%	Donald Trump	50%	6	638	± 3.9%
NBC News/Wall Street Journal/Marist	September 6–8, 2016	Hillary Clinton	43%	Donald Trump	46%	3	625	± 3.9%

Three-way race

Poll source	Date administered	Democrat	%	Republican	%	Libertarian	%	Lead margin	Sample size	Margin of error
Landmark Communications/Rosetta Stone	November 6, 2016	Hillary Clinton	46%	Donald Trump	49%	Gary Johnson	3%	3	1,200	± 2.8%
Landmark Communications/Rosetta Stone	November 2–3, 2016	Hillary Clinton	46%	Donald Trump	48%	Gary Johnson	4%	2	1,000	± 3.1%
Opinion Survey/Fox 5 Atlanta	November 2–3, 2016	Hillary Clinton	45%	Donald Trump	49%	Gary Johnson	6%	4	538	± 4.2%
NBC News/Wall Street Journal/Marist	October 30 – November 1, 2016	Hillary Clinton	44%	Donald Trump	45%	Gary Johnson	8%	1	707	±3.7%
WXIA-TV/SurveyUSA	October 25–27, 2016	Hillary Clinton	42%	Donald Trump	49%	Gary Johnson	3%	7	593	± 4.2%
Quinnipiac University	October 20–26, 2016	Hillary Clinton	43%	Donald Trump	44%	Gary Johnson	8%	1	707	± 3.7%
Landmark Communications/Rosetta Stone	October 20, 2016	Hillary Clinton	43%	Donald Trump	47%	Gary Johnson	5%	4	600	± 4.0%
Opinion Savvy/Fox 5 Atlanta	October 20, 2016	Hillary Clinton	46%	Donald Trump	50%	Gary Johnson	3%	4	570	± 4.1%
Atlantic Journal Constitution	October 17–20, 2016	Hillary Clinton	42%	Donald Trump	44%	Gary Johnson	9%	2	839	± 4.3%
Clout Research	October 15–18, 2016	Hillary Clinton	43%	Donald Trump	46%	Gary Johnson	2%	3	627	± 3.9%
Landmark Communications/Rosetta Stone	October 11–12, 2016	Hillary Clinton	42%	Donald Trump	48%	Gary Johnson	4%	6	1,400	± 2.7%
Landmark Communications/Rosetta Stone	September 21–22, 2016	Hillary Clinton	43%	Donald Trump	47%	Gary Johnson	6%	4	600	± 4.0%
JMC Analytics	September 20–22, 2016	Hillary Clinton	38%	Donald Trump	44%	Gary Johnson	5%	6	600	± 4.0%
Quinnipiac University	September 13–21, 2016	Hillary Clinton	40%	Donald Trump	47%	Gary Johnson	9%	7	638	± 4.9%
Monmouth University	September 15–18, 2016	Hillary Clinton	42%	Donald Trump	45%	Gary Johnson	8%	3	401	± 4.9%
Opinion Savvy/Fox 5 Atlanta	September 14, 2016	Hillary Clinton	42%	Donald Trump	46%	Gary Johnson	10%	4	568	± 4.1%
NBC News/Wall Street Journal/Marist	September 6–8, 2016	Hillary Clinton	42%	Donald Trump	44%	Gary Johnson	10%	2	625	± 3.9%

Four-way race

Poll source	Date administered	Democrat	%	Republican	%	Libertarian	%	Green	%	Lead margin	Sample size	Margin of error
Trafalgar Group	November 6, 2016	Hillary Clinton	45%	Donald Trump	52%	Gary Johnson	2%	Jill Stein	0%	7	1,250	± 2.76%
Emerson College	October 29–31, 2016	Hillary Clinton	42%	Donald Trump	51%	Gary Johnson	2%	Jill Stein	3%	9	650	± 3.8%
Emerson College	September 9–13, 2016	Hillary Clinton	39%	Donald Trump	45%	Gary Johnson	6%	Jill Stein	3%	6	600	± 3.9%

== Hawaii ==
4 electoral votes
(Democratic in 2008) 72%–27%
(Democratic in 2012) 71%–28%

Winner
(Democratic in 2016) 62%–30%

No polling was conducted in 2016

== Idaho ==
4 electoral votes
(Republican in 2008) 61%–36%
(Republican in 2012) 64%–32%

Winner
(Republican in 2016) 59%–28%

Four-way race

Poll source	Date administered	Democrat	%	Republican	%	Libertarian	%	Other	%	Lead margin	Sample size	Margin of error
Heat Street/Rasmussen Reports	October 23–24, 2016	Hillary Clinton	29%	Donald Trump	48%	Gary Johnson	6%	Evan McMullin	10%	19	750	± 4.0%
Emerson College	October 21–23, 2016	Hillary Clinton	23%	Donald Trump	52%	Gary Johnson	4%	Evan McMullin	10%	29	1,023	± 3.0%
Dan Jones & Associates	September 28 – October 9, 2016	Hillary Clinton	30%	Donald Trump	40%	Gary Johnson	10%	Jill Stein	3%	10	608	± 3.97%

== Illinois ==
20 electoral votes
(Democratic in 2008) 62%–37%
(Democratic in 2012) 58%–41%

Winner
(Democratic in 2016) 56%–39%

Two-way race

Poll source	Date administered	Democrat	%	Republican	%	Lead margin	Sample size	Margin of error
Loras College	October 26–27, 2016	Hillary Clinton	48%	Donald Trump	37%	11	600	± 4.0%
Loras College	September 13–16, 2016	Hillary Clinton	47%	Donald Trump	33%	14	600	± 4.0%

Four-way race

Poll source	Date administered	Democrat	%	Republican	%	Libertarian	%	Green Party	%	Lead margin	Sample size	Margin of error
Emerson College	October 27–30, 2016	Hillary Clinton	53%	Donald Trump	41%	Gary Johnson	2%	Jill Stein	0%	12	500	± 4.3%
Loras College	October 26–27, 2016	Hillary Clinton	45%	Donald Trump	34%	Gary Johnson	6%	Jill Stein	2%	11	600	± 4.0%
Victory Research	October 16–18, 2016	Hillary Clinton	51%	Donald Trump	36%	Gary Johnson	6%	Jill Stein	2%	15	1,200	± 2.83%
Illinois Public Opinion Strategies	October 13, 2016	Hillary Clinton	50%	Donald Trump	32%	Gary Johnson	6%	Jill Stein	1%	18	664	± 3.5%
Southern Illinois University	September 27 – October 2, 2016	Hillary Clinton	53%	Donald Trump	28%	Gary Johnson	5%	Jill Stein	2%	25	865	± 3.3%
Victory Research	September 21–24, 2016	Hillary Clinton	49%	Donald Trump	35%	Gary Johnson	4%	Jill Stein	1%	14	1,200	± 2.83%
Emerson College	September 19–20, 2016	Hillary Clinton	45%	Donald Trump	39%	Gary Johnson	6%	Jill Stein	3%	6	700	± 3.6%
Loras College	September 13–16, 2016	Hillary Clinton	43%	Donald Trump	30%	Gary Johnson	8%	Jill Stein	3%	13	600	± 4.0%
We Ask America	September 12, 2016	Hillary Clinton	51%	Donald Trump	33%	Gary Johnson	4%	Jill Stein	1%	18	955	± 3.17%

== Indiana ==
11 electoral votes
(Democratic in 2008) 50%–49%
(Republican in 2012) 54%–44%

Winner
(Republican in 2016) 57%–38%

Three-way race

Poll source	Date administered	Democrat	%	Republican	%	Independent/ Third-party candidate	%	Lead margin	Sample size	Margin of error
WTHR/Howey Politics Indiana	November 1–3, 2016	Hillary Clinton	37%	Donald Trump	48%	Gary Johnson	9%	11	600	± 4.0%
Gravis Marketing	October 30 – November 1, 2016	Hillary Clinton	39%	Donald Trump	49%	Gary Johnson	5%	10	399	± 4.9%
Monmouth University	October 27–30, 2016	Hillary Clinton	39%	Donald Trump	50%	Gary Johnson	4%	11	402	± 4.9%
Gravis Marketing	October 22–24, 2016	Hillary Clinton	38%	Donald Trump	49%	Gary Johnson	5%	11	596	± 2.3%
WISH-TV/Ball State University	October 10–16, 2016	Hillary Clinton	37%	Donald Trump	43%	Gary Johnson	9%	6	544	± 4.8%
Monmouth University	October 11–13, 2016	Hillary Clinton	41%	Donald Trump	45%	Gary Johnson	9%	4	402	± 4.9%
WTHR/Howey Politics Indiana	October 3–5, 2016	Hillary Clinton	38%	Donald Trump	43%	Gary Johnson	11%	5	600	± 4%
WTHR/Howey Politics Indiana	September 6–8, 2016	Hillary Clinton	36%	Donald Trump	43%	Gary Johnson	11%	7	600	± 4%

Four-way race

Poll source	Date administered	Democrat	%	Republican	%	Libertarian	%	Green	%	Lead margin	Sample size	Margin of error
Lucid/The Times-Picayune	October 7–10, 2016	Hillary Clinton	36%	Donald Trump	44%	Gary Johnson	10%	Jill Stein	3%	8	1,313	± %

== Iowa ==
6 electoral votes
(Democratic in 2008) 54%–44%
(Democratic in 2012) 52%–46%

Winner
(Republican in 2016) 51%–42%

Two-way race

Poll source	Date administered	Democrat	%	Republican	%	Lead margin	Sample size	Margin of error
Simpson College/RABA Research	November 1–2, 2016	Hillary Clinton	44%	Donald Trump	46%	2	1,076	± 3.0%
Quinnipiac University	October 20–26, 2016	Hillary Clinton	46%	Donald Trump	47%	1	791	± 3.5%
Loras College	September 20–22, 2016	Hillary Clinton	42%	Donald Trump	42%	Tied	491	± 4.4%
Quinnipiac University	September 13–21, 2016	Hillary Clinton	44%	Donald Trump	50%	6	612	± 4%
Simpson College/RABA Research	September 6–8, 2016	Hillary Clinton	42%	Donald Trump	43%	1	1,054	± 3.0%

Four-way race

Poll source	Date administered	Democrat	%	Republican	%	Libertarian	%	Green	%	Lead margin	Sample size	Margin of error
Des Moines Register/Selzer & Co.	November 1–4, 2016	Hillary Clinton	39%	Donald Trump	46%	Gary Johnson	6%	Jill Stein	1%	7	800	± 3.5%
Emerson College	November 1–3, 2016	Hillary Clinton	41%	Donald Trump	44%	Gary Johnson	5%	Jill Stein	4%	3	700	± 3.6%
Loras College	November 1–3, 2016	Hillary Clinton	44%	Donald Trump	43%	Gary Johnson	3%	Jill Stein	3%	1	500	± 4.4%
Quinnipiac University	October 20–26, 2016	Hillary Clinton	44%	Donald Trump	44%	Gary Johnson	4%	Jill Stein	1%	Tied	791	± 3.5%
Des Moines Register/Selzer & Co.	October 3–6, 2016	Hillary Clinton	39%	Donald Trump	43%	Gary Johnson	6%	Jill Stein	2%	4	800	± 3.5%
Loras College	September 20–22, 2016	Hillary Clinton	38%	Donald Trump	38%	Gary Johnson	9%	Jill Stein	1%	Tied	491	± 4.4%
Quinnipiac University	September 13–21, 2016	Hillary Clinton	37%	Donald Trump	44%	Gary Johnson	10%	Jill Stein	2%	7	612	± 4%
Monmouth University	September 12–14, 2016	Hillary Clinton	37%	Donald Trump	45%	Gary Johnson	8%	Jill Stein	2%	8	404	± 4.9%
Simpson College/RABA Research	September 6–8, 2016	Hillary Clinton	39%	Donald Trump	40%	Gary Johnson	10%	Jill Stein	3%	1	1,054	± 3.0%

Five-way race

Poll source	Date administered	Democrat	%	Republican	%	Libertarian	%	Green	%	Independent	%	Lead margin	Sample size	Margin of error
Simpson College/RABA Research	November 1–2, 2016	Hillary Clinton	41%	Donald Trump	44%	Gary Johnson	5%	Jill Stein	2%	Evan McMullin	2%	3	1,076	± 3.0%

== Kansas ==
6 electoral votes
(Republican in 2008) 56%–42%
(Republican in 2012) 60%–38%

Winner
(Republican in 2016) 57%–36%

Two-way race

Poll source	Date administered	Democrat	%	Republican	%	Lead margin	Sample size	Margin of error
Fort Hays State University	November 1–3, 2016	Hillary Clinton	34%	Donald Trump	58%	24	313	± 5.5%

Four-way race

Poll source	Date administered	Democrat	%	Republican	%	Libertarian	%	Green	%	Lead margin	Sample size	Margin of error
SurveyUSA/KSN News	October 26–30, 2016	Hillary Clinton	38%	Donald Trump	49%	Gary Johnson	7%	Jill Stein	1%	11	624	± 4.0%
SurveyUSA/KSN News	October 11–15, 2016	Hillary Clinton	36%	Donald Trump	47%	Gary Johnson	7%	Jill Stein	2%	11	581	± 4.1%
SurveyUSA/KSN News	September 6–11, 2016	Hillary Clinton	36%	Donald Trump	48%	Gary Johnson	8%	Jill Stein	2%	12	595	± 4.1%

== Kentucky ==
8 electoral votes
(Republican in 2008) 57%–41%
(Republican in 2012) 60%–38%

Winner
(Republican in 2016) 63%–33%

Two-way race

Poll source	Date administered	Democrat	%	Republican	%	Lead margin	Sample size	Margin of error
RunSwitch PR	October 26–28, 2016	Hillary Clinton	32%	Donald Trump	56%	24	811	± 3.44%

Five-way race

Poll source	Date administered	Democrat	%	Republican	%	Libertarian	%	Green	%	Independent	%	Lead margin	Sample size	Margin of error
Western Kentucky University	October 25–30, 2016	Hillary Clinton	37%	Donald Trump	54%	Gary Johnson	1%	Jill Stein	1%	Evan McMullin	1%	17	602	± 4.0%

== Louisiana ==
8 electoral votes
(Republican in 2008) 59%–40%
(Republican in 2012) 58%–41%

Winner
(Republican in 2016) 58%–38%

Three-way race

Poll source	Date administered	Democrat	%	Republican	%	Independent/ Third-party candidate	%	Lead margin	Sample size	Margin of error
Southern Media & Opinion Research	October 19–21, 2016	Hillary Clinton	35%	Donald Trump	50%	Gary Johnson	5%	15	500	± 4.4%
Southern Media & Opinion Research	September 15–17, 2016	Hillary Clinton	33%	Donald Trump	49%	Gary Johnson	8%	16	500	± 4.4%

Four-way race

Poll source	Date administered	Democrat	%	Republican	%	Libertarian	%	Green	%	Lead margin	Sample size	Margin of error
University of New Orleans	October 15–21, 2016	Hillary Clinton	35%	Donald Trump	49%	Gary Johnson	7%	Jill Stein	2%	14	603	± 4.0%
Mason-Dixon	October 17–19, 2016	Hillary Clinton	34%	Donald Trump	54%	Gary Johnson	2%	Jill Stein	1%	20	625	± 4.0%
JMC Analytics	October 11–15, 2016	Hillary Clinton	38%	Donald Trump	45%	Gary Johnson	4%	Jill Stein	1%	7	800	± 3.5%
JMC Analytics	September 22–24, 2016	Hillary Clinton	35%	Donald Trump	45%	Gary Johnson	6%	Jill Stein	2%	10	905	± 3.3%

== Maine ==
4 electoral votes (statewide vote worth 2 EVs; 1st and 2nd congressional districts worth 1 EV each)
(Democratic in 2008) 58%–40%
(Democratic in 2012) 56%–41%

Winner
(Democratic in 2016) 48%–45%

Poll source	Date administered	Democrat	%	Republican	%	Lead margin	Sample size	Margin of error
Maine People's Resource Center	November 2–3, 2016	Hillary Clinton	50%	Donald Trump	41%	9	855	± 3.4%
Maine People's Resource Center	October 24–26, 2016	Hillary Clinton	47%	Donald Trump	40%	7	812	± 3.4%
Maine People's Resource Center	October 14–15, 2016	Hillary Clinton	49%	Donald Trump	39%	10	890	± 3.3%
Maine People's Resource Center	October 7–9, 2016	Hillary Clinton	49%	Donald Trump	40%	9	892	± 3.3%
Maine People's Resource Center	September 15–17, 2016	Hillary Clinton	45%	Donald Trump	40%	5	835	± 3.4%

Four-way race

Poll source	Date administered	Democrat	%	Republican	%	Libertarian	%	Green	%	Lead margin	Sample size	Margin of error
Maine People's Resource Center	November 2–3, 2016	Hillary Clinton	45%	Donald Trump	39%	Gary Johnson	7%	Jill Stein	4%	6	855	± 3.4%
Emerson College	October 28–30, 2016	Hillary Clinton	46%	Donald Trump	42%	Gary Johnson	5%	Jill Stein	1%	4	750	± 3.5%
Maine People's Resource Center	October 24–26, 2016	Hillary Clinton	42%	Donald Trump	37%	Gary Johnson	9%	Jill Stein	4%	5	812	± 3.4%
University of New Hampshire	October 20–25, 2016	Hillary Clinton	48%	Donald Trump	37%	Gary Johnson	5%	Jill Stein	3%	11	670	± 3.8%
Maine People's Resource Center	October 14–15, 2016	Hillary Clinton	42%	Donald Trump	36%	Gary Johnson	9%	Jill Stein	4%	6	890	± 3.3%
Maine People's Resource Center	October 7–9, 2016	Hillary Clinton	44%	Donald Trump	36%	Gary Johnson	9%	Jill Stein	3%	8	892	± 3.3%
University of New Hampshire	September 15–20, 2016	Hillary Clinton	40%	Donald Trump	36%	Gary Johnson	12%	Jill Stein	3%	4	513	± 4.3%
Maine People's Resource Center	September 15–17, 2016	Hillary Clinton	37%	Donald Trump	37%	Gary Johnson	11%	Jill Stein	5%	Tied	835	± 3.4%
Colby College/Boston Globe	September 4–10, 2016	Hillary Clinton	42%	Donald Trump	39%	Gary Johnson	9%	Jill Stein	5%	3	779	± 3.6%
Emerson College	September 2–5, 2016	Hillary Clinton	44%	Donald Trump	35%	Gary Johnson	12%	Jill Stein	2%	9	800	± 3.4%

== Maryland ==
10 electoral votes
(Democratic in 2008) 62%–36%
(Democratic in 2012) 62%–36%

Winner
(Democratic in 2016) 60%–34%

Four-way race

Poll source	Date administered	Democrat	%	Republican	%	Libertarian	%	Green	%	Lead margin	Sample size	Margin of error
Washington Post/University of Maryland	September 27–30, 2016	Hillary Clinton	63%	Donald Trump	27%	Gary Johnson	4%	Jill Stein	2%	36	706	± 4.0%
Goucher Poll	September 17–20, 2016	Hillary Clinton	58%	Donald Trump	25%	Gary Johnson	6%	Jill Stein	2%	33	514	± 4.3%

== Massachusetts ==
11 electoral votes
(Democratic in 2008) 62%–36%
(Democratic in 2012) 61%–38%

Winner
(Democratic in 2016) 60%–33%

Two-way race

Poll source	Date administered	Democrat	%	Republican	%	Lead margin	Sample size	Margin of error
Western New England University	September 24 – October 3, 2016	Hillary Clinton	65%	Donald Trump	30%	35	403	± 5.0%
WBUR/MassINC	September 7–10, 2016	Hillary Clinton	60%	Donald Trump	31%	29	506	± 4.4%

Four-way race

Poll source	Date administered	Democrat	%	Republican	%	Libertarian	%	Green	%	Lead margin	Sample size	Margin of error
Western New England University	October 23 – November 2, 2016	Hillary Clinton	56%	Donald Trump	26%	Gary Johnson	8%	Jill Stein	3%	30	417	± 5.0%
Suffolk University	October 24–26, 2016	Hillary Clinton	57%	Donald Trump	25%	Gary Johnson	4%	Jill Stein	3%	32	500	±4.4%
WBUR/MassINC	October 13–16, 2016	Hillary Clinton	54%	Donald Trump	28%	Gary Johnson	7%	Jill Stein	3%	26	502	±4.4%
Western New England University	September 24 – October 3, 2016	Hillary Clinton	58%	Donald Trump	26%	Gary Johnson	7%	Jill Stein	4%	32	403	± 5.0%
UMass Amherst/WBZ Poll	September 15–20, 2016	Hillary Clinton	47%	Donald Trump	34%	Gary Johnson	9%	Jill Stein	3%	13	700	± 4.3%
WBUR/MassINC	September 7–10, 2016	Hillary Clinton	54%	Donald Trump	28%	Gary Johnson	9%	Jill Stein	4%	26	500	± 4.3%
Emerson College	September 3–5, 2016	Hillary Clinton	50%	Donald Trump	33%	Gary Johnson	9%	Jill Stein	2%	17	500	± 4.3%

== Michigan ==
16 electoral votes
(Democratic in 2008) 57%–41%
(Democratic in 2012) 54%–45%

Winner
(Republican in 2016) 48%–47%

Two-way race

Poll source	Date administered	Democrat	%	Republican	%	Lead margin	Sample size	Margin of error
Public Policy Polling	November 3–4, 2016	Hillary Clinton	50%	Donald Trump	44%	6	957	± 3.2%
Fox 2 Detroit/Mitchell Poll	November 3, 2016	Hillary Clinton	50%	Donald Trump	45%	5	1,007	± 3.1%
Fox 2 Detroit/Mitchell Poll	November 2, 2016	Hillary Clinton	51%	Donald Trump	46%	5	1,150	± 2.89%
Fox 2 Detroit/Mitchell Poll	November 1, 2016	Hillary Clinton	49%	Donald Trump	44%	5	887	± 3.29%
Fox 2 Detroit/Mitchell Poll	October 31, 2016	Hillary Clinton	51%	Donald Trump	45%	6	737	± 3.61%
Fox 2 Detroit/Mitchell Poll	October 30, 2016	Hillary Clinton	51%	Donald Trump	42%	9	953	± 3.17%
Michigan State University	September 1 – October 30, 2016	Hillary Clinton	52%	Donald Trump	32%	20	746	± 3.6%
Fox 2 Detroit/Mitchell Poll	October 25, 2016	Hillary Clinton	50%	Donald Trump	44%	6	1,030	± 2.78%
EPIC-MRA	October 22–25, 2016	Hillary Clinton	45%	Donald Trump	37%	8	600	± 4.0%
Fox 2 Detroit/Mitchell Poll	October 23, 2016	Hillary Clinton	51%	Donald Trump	43%	8	1,241	± 2.78%
MRG	October 16–19, 2016	Hillary Clinton	46%	Donald Trump	38%	8	600	± 4.0%
Fox 2 Detroit/Mitchell Poll	October 18, 2016	Hillary Clinton	53%	Donald Trump	41%	12	1,102	± 2.59%
Ipsos/Reuters	October 6–17, 2016	Hillary Clinton	40%	Donald Trump	36%	4	1,370	± 3.0%
Detroit News	October 10–11, 2016	Hillary Clinton	47%	Donald Trump	33%	14	600	± 4.0%
Fox 2 Detroit/Mitchell Poll	September 27, 2016	Hillary Clinton	49%	Donald Trump	44%	5	1,956	± 2.2%
EPIC-MRA	September 10–13, 2016	Hillary Clinton	42%	Donald Trump	38%	4	600	± 4.0%
Fox 2 Detroit/Mitchell Poll	September 6–7, 2016	Hillary Clinton	47%	Donald Trump	42%	5	940	± 3.2%

Three-way race

Poll source	Date administered	Democrat	%	Republican	%	Libertarian	%	Lead margin	Sample size	Margin of error
Target Insyght	September 18–24, 2016	Hillary Clinton	46%	Donald Trump	41%	Gary Johnson	8%	5	600	± 4%

Four-way race

Poll source	Date administered	Democrat	%	Republican	%	Libertarian	%	Green	%	Lead margin	Sample size	Margin of error
Trafalgar Group	November 6, 2016	Hillary Clinton	47%	Donald Trump	49%	Gary Johnson	3%	Jill Stein	1%	2	1,200	± 2.77%
Public Policy Polling	November 3–4, 2016	Hillary Clinton	46%	Donald Trump	41%	Gary Johnson	6%	Jill Stein	2%	5	957	± 3.2%
Fox 2 Detroit/Mitchell Poll	November 3, 2016	Hillary Clinton	46%	Donald Trump	41%	Gary Johnson	7%	Jill Stein	3%	5	1,007	± 3.1%
EPIC-MRA	November 1–3, 2016	Hillary Clinton	42%	Donald Trump	38%	Gary Johnson	5%	Jill Stein	2%	4	600	± 4.0%
Fox 2 Detroit/Mitchell Poll	November 2, 2016	Hillary Clinton	47%	Donald Trump	44%	Gary Johnson	4%	Jill Stein	3%	3	1,150	± 2.89%
Fox 2 Detroit/Mitchell Poll	November 1, 2016	Hillary Clinton	47%	Donald Trump	44%	Gary Johnson	4%	Jill Stein	3%	3	887	± 3.29%
Fox 2 Detroit/Mitchell Poll	October 31, 2016	Hillary Clinton	50%	Donald Trump	43%	Gary Johnson	4%	Jill Stein	1%	7	737	± 3.61%
Fox 2 Detroit/Mitchell Poll	October 30, 2016	Hillary Clinton	47%	Donald Trump	41%	Gary Johnson	6%	Jill Stein	2%	6	953	± 3.17%
Michigan State University	September 1 – October 30, 2016	Hillary Clinton	47%	Donald Trump	28%	Gary Johnson	11%	Jill Stein	4%	19	746	± 3.6%
Emerson College	October 25–26, 2016	Hillary Clinton	50%	Donald Trump	43%	Gary Johnson	3%	Jill Stein	3%	7	500	± 4.3%
Fox 2 Detroit/Mitchell Poll	October 25, 2016	Hillary Clinton	48%	Donald Trump	42%	Gary Johnson	5%	Jill Stein	1%	6	1,030	± 2.78%
EPIC-MRA	October 22–25, 2016	Hillary Clinton	41%	Donald Trump	34%	Gary Johnson	9%	Jill Stein	3%	7	600	± 4.0%
Fox 2 Detroit/Mitchell Poll	October 23, 2016	Hillary Clinton	49%	Donald Trump	41%	Gary Johnson	3%	Jill Stein	1%	8	1,241	± 2.78%
MRG	October 16–19, 2016	Hillary Clinton	41%	Donald Trump	36%	Gary Johnson	7%	Jill Stein	3%	5	600	± 4.0%
Fox 2 Detroit/Mitchell Poll	October 18, 2016	Hillary Clinton	51%	Donald Trump	38%	Gary Johnson	6%	Jill Stein	2%	13	1,102	± 2.95%
Ipsos/Reuters	October 6–17, 2016	Hillary Clinton	40%	Donald Trump	36%	Gary Johnson	7%	Jill Stein	2%	4	1,370	± 3.0%
Fox 2 Detroit/Mitchell Poll	October 11, 2016	Hillary Clinton	47%	Donald Trump	37%	Gary Johnson	7%	Jill Stein	4%	10	1,429	± 2.59%
Detroit News	October 10–11, 2016	Hillary Clinton	42%	Donald Trump	31%	Gary Johnson	10%	Jill Stein	5%	11	600	± 4.0%
EPIC-MRA	October 1–3, 2016	Hillary Clinton	43%	Donald Trump	32%	Gary Johnson	10%	Jill Stein	3%	11	600	± 4.0%
The Detroit News/WDIV-TV	September 27–28, 2016	Hillary Clinton	42%	Donald Trump	35%	Gary Johnson	9%	Jill Stein	3%	7	600	± 4.0%
Fox 2 Detroit/Mitchell Poll	September 27, 2016	Hillary Clinton	46%	Donald Trump	41%	Gary Johnson	8%	Jill Stein	1%	5	1,956	± 2.2%
EPIC-MRA	September 10–13, 2016	Hillary Clinton	38%	Donald Trump	35%	Gary Johnson	10%	Jill Stein	4%	3	600	± 4.0%
Fox 2 Detroit/Mitchell Poll	September 6–7, 2016	Hillary Clinton	45%	Donald Trump	39%	Gary Johnson	7%	Jill Stein	1%	6	940	± 3.2%

== Minnesota ==
10 electoral votes
(Democratic in 2008) 54%–44%
(Democratic in 2012) 53%–45%

Winner
(Democratic in 2016) 46%–45%

Two-way race

Poll source	Date administered	Democrat	%	Republican	%	Lead margin	Sample size	Margin of error
SurveyUSA/KSTP-TV	October 22–26, 2016	Hillary Clinton	53%	Donald Trump	42%	11	656	± 3.9%
SurveyUSA/KSTP-TV	September 16–20, 2016	Hillary Clinton	49%	Donald Trump	43%	6	625	± 4%

Four-way race

Poll source	Date administered	Democrat	%	Republican	%	Libertarian	%	Green	%	Lead margin	Sample size	Margin of error
SurveyUSA/KSTP-TV	October 22–26, 2016	Hillary Clinton	49%	Donald Trump	39%	Gary Johnson	5%	Jill Stein	2%	10	656	± 3.9%
SurveyUSA/KSTP-TV	September 16–20, 2016	Hillary Clinton	46%	Donald Trump	39%	Gary Johnson	6%	Jill Stein	2%	7	625	± 4%
Star Tribune	September 12–14, 2016	Hillary Clinton	44%	Donald Trump	38%	Gary Johnson	6%	Jill Stein	2%	6	625	± 4%

Five-way race

Poll source	Date administered	Democrat	%	Republican	%	Libertarian	%	Green	%	Independent	%	Lead margin	Sample size	Margin of error
Star Tribune/Mason-Dixon	October 20–22, 2016	Hillary Clinton	47%	Donald Trump	39%	Gary Johnson	6%	Jill Stein	1%	Evan McMullin	1%	8	625	± 4.0%

== Mississippi ==
6 electoral votes
(Republican in 2008) 56%–43%
(Republican in 2012) 55%–44%

Winner
(Republican in 2016) 58%–40%

No polling conducted post September 1, 2016

== Missouri ==
10 electoral votes
(Republican in 2008) 49.4%–49.2%
(Republican in 2012) 53%–44%

Winner
(Republican in 2016) 57%–38%

Two-way race

Poll source	Date administered	Democrat	%	Republican	%	Lead margin	Sample size	Margin of error
Public Policy Polling	October 31 – November 1, 2016	Hillary Clinton	41%	Donald Trump	52%	11	1,083	± 3.0%
MO Scout/BK Strategies	October 27–28, 2016	Hillary Clinton	39%	Donald Trump	53%	14	1,698	± 2.38%

Three-way race

Poll source	Date administered	Democrat	%	Republican	%	Libertarian	%	Lead margin	Sample size	Margin of error
Remington Research Group/Axiom Strategies	September 26–27, 2016	Hillary Clinton	39%	Donald Trump	49%	Gary Johnson	5%	10	1,279	± 3%

Four-way race

Poll source	Date administered	Democrat	%	Republican	%	Libertarian	%	Green	%	Lead margin	Sample size	Margin of error
Emerson College	November 4–5, 2016	Hillary Clinton	41%	Donald Trump	47%	Gary Johnson	7%	Jill Stein	2%	6	750	± 3.5%
Public Policy Polling	November 1–2, 2016	Hillary Clinton	37%	Donald Trump	50%	Gary Johnson	4%	Jill Stein	2%	13	871	± 3.3%
Remington Research Group	October 31 – November 1, 2016	Hillary Clinton	39%	Donald Trump	51%	Gary Johnson	4%	Jill Stein	1%	12	1,722	± 2.36%
DHM Research	October 27 – November 1, 2016	Hillary Clinton	38%	Donald Trump	47%	Gary Johnson	3%	Jill Stein	1%	9	508	± 4.4%
Emerson College	October 28–31, 2016	Hillary Clinton	37%	Donald Trump	52%	Gary Johnson	5%	Jill Stein	2%	15	650	± 3.8%
Monmouth University	October 28–31, 2016	Hillary Clinton	38%	Donald Trump	52%	Gary Johnson	4%	Jill Stein	2%	14	405	± 4.9%
Mason-Dixon	October 24–26, 2016	Hillary Clinton	42%	Donald Trump	47%	Gary Johnson	3%	Jill Stein	1%	5	625	± 4%
Remington Research Group/Axiom Strategies	October 23–25, 2016	Hillary Clinton	39%	Donald Trump	50%	Gary Johnson	4%	Jill Stein	1%	11	2,559	± 1.94%
Emerson College	October 17–19, 2016	Hillary Clinton	39%	Donald Trump	47%	Gary Johnson	5%	Jill Stein	2%	8	600	± 3.9%
Remington Research Group/Axiom Strategies	October 9–11, 2016	Hillary Clinton	42%	Donald Trump	47%	Gary Johnson	4%	Jill Stein	1%	5	2,171	± 2.1%
Monmouth University	October 9–11, 2016	Hillary Clinton	41%	Donald Trump	46%	Gary Johnson	5%	Jill Stein	2%	5	406	± 4.9%
CBS News/YouGov	September 21–23, 2016	Hillary Clinton	37%	Donald Trump	46%	Gary Johnson	5%	Jill Stein	2%	9	1,087	± 3.9%
Emerson College	September 9–13, 2016	Hillary Clinton	34%	Donald Trump	47%	Gary Johnson	7%	Jill Stein	6%	13	600	± 3.9%
Remington Research Group/Axiom Strategies	September 1–2, 2016	Hillary Clinton	38%	Donald Trump	47%	Gary Johnson	8%	Jill Stein	3%	9	1,275	± 3%

== Montana ==
3 electoral votes
(Republican in 2008) 49%–47%
(Republican in 2012) 55%–42%

Winner
(Republican in 2016) 56%–36%

Three-way race

Poll source	Date administered	Democrat	%	Republican	%	Libertarian	%	Lead margin	Sample size	Margin of error
Mason-Dixon	October 10–12, 2016	Hillary Clinton	36%	Donald Trump	46%	Gary Johnson	11%	10	1,003	± 3.2%

Four-way race

Poll source	Date administered	Democrat	%	Republican	%	Libertarian	%	Green	%	Lead margin	Sample size	Margin of error
Montana State University Billings	October 3–10, 2016	Hillary Clinton	27%	Donald Trump	43%	Gary Johnson	7%	Jill Stein	2%	16	590	± 4.0%

== Nebraska ==
5 electoral votes (statewide vote worth 2 EVs; 1st, 2nd, and 3rd congressional districts worth 1 EV each)
(Republican in 2008) 57%–42%
(Republican in 2012) 60%–38%

Winner
(Republican in 2016) 59%–34%

Four-way race

Poll source	Date administered	Democrat	%	Republican	%	Libertarian	%	Green	%	Lead margin	Sample size	Margin of error
Emerson College	September 25–27, 2016	Hillary Clinton	29%	Donald Trump	56%	Gary Johnson	7%	Jill Stein	1%	27	700	± 3.6%

== Nevada ==
6 electoral votes
(Democratic in 2008) 55%–43%
(Democratic in 2012) 52%–46%

Winner
(Democratic in 2016) 48%–46%

Two-way race

Poll source	Date administered	Democrat	%	Republican	%	Lead margin	Sample size	Margin of error
Public Policy Polling	October 31 – November 1, 2016	Hillary Clinton	48%	Donald Trump	45%	3	688	± 3.7%
CNN/ORC	October 27 – November 1, 2016	Hillary Clinton	45%	Donald Trump	51%	6	790	± 3.5%
NBC News/Wall Street Journal/Marist College	October 20–24, 2016	Hillary Clinton	45%	Donald Trump	45%	Tied	707	±3.7%
CNN/ORC	October 10–15, 2016	Hillary Clinton	50%	Donald Trump	46%	4	698	± 3.5%
Clarity Campaign Labs	October 10–11, 2016	Hillary Clinton	43%	Donald Trump	43%	Tied	1,010	± 3.1%
Public Policy Polling	October 10–11, 2016	Hillary Clinton	47%	Donald Trump	43%	4	986	± 3.1%
Fox News	September 18–20, 2016	Hillary Clinton	42%	Donald Trump	46%	4	704	± 3.5%
Greenberg Quinlan Rosner	September 10–19, 2016	Hillary Clinton	49%	Donald Trump	46%	3	400	± 4.9%
NBC News/Wall Street Journal/Marist	September 6–8, 2016	Hillary Clinton	45%	Donald Trump	44%	1	627	± 3.9%
Public Policy Polling	September 6–7, 2016	Hillary Clinton	45%	Donald Trump	42%	3	815	± 3.4%

Three-way

Poll source	Date administered	Democrat	%	Republican	%	Libertarian	%	Lead margin	Sample size	Margin of error
Remington Research Group/Axiom Strategies	November 1–2, 2016	Hillary Clinton	45%	Donald Trump	46%	Gary Johnson	3%	1	1,793	± 2.31%
JMC Analytics/8 News NOW	October 28 – November 1, 2016	Hillary Clinton	45%	Donald Trump	45%	Gary Johnson	4%	Tied	600	± 4.0%
CNN/ORC	October 27 – November 1, 2016	Hillary Clinton	43%	Donald Trump	49%	Gary Johnson	5%	6	790	± 3.5%
Remington Research/Axiom Strategies	October 23–30, 2016	Hillary Clinton	44%	Donald Trump	48%	Gary Johnson	4%	4	787	± 3.49%
NBC News/Wall Street Journal/Marist College	October 20–24, 2016	Hillary Clinton	43%	Donald Trump	43%	Gary Johnson	10%	Tied	707	±3.7%
Las Vegas Review-Journal/Bendixen & Amandi International	October 20–23, 2016	Hillary Clinton	48%	Donald Trump	41%	Gary Johnson	6%	7	800	± 3.5%
Remington Research Group/Axiom Strategies	October 20–22, 2016	Hillary Clinton	44%	Donald Trump	47%	Gary Johnson	4%	3	1,332	± 2.68%
KTNV/Rasmussen Reports	October 20–22, 2016	Hillary Clinton	46%	Donald Trump	42%	Gary Johnson	6%	4	826	± 3.5%
Monmouth University	October 14–17, 2016	Hillary Clinton	47%	Donald Trump	40%	Gary Johnson	7%	7	413	± 4.8%
CNN/ORC	October 10–15, 2016	Hillary Clinton	46%	Donald Trump	44%	Gary Johnson	7%	2	698	± 3.5%
CBS News/YouGov	October 12–14, 2016	Hillary Clinton	46%	Donald Trump	40%	Gary Johnson	4%	6	996	± 4.5%
JMC Analytics/8 News NOW	October 10–13, 2016	Hillary Clinton	43%	Donald Trump	41%	Gary Johnson	4%	2	600	± 4.0%
Public Opinion Strategies	October 11–12, 2016	Hillary Clinton	45%	Donald Trump	39%	Gary Johnson	10%	6	600	± 4%
UNLV/Hart Research	September 27 – October 2, 2016	Hillary Clinton	44%	Donald Trump	41%	Gary Johnson	8%	3	700	± 3.8%
Las Vegas Review-Journal/Bendixen & Amandi International	September 27–29, 2016	Hillary Clinton	45%	Donald Trump	44%	Gary Johnson	5%	1	800	± 3.5%
Fox News	September 18–20, 2016	Hillary Clinton	40%	Donald Trump	43%	Gary Johnson	8%	3	704	± 3.5%
KTNV/Rasmussen Reports	September 16–18, 2016	Hillary Clinton	39%	Donald Trump	42%	Gary Johnson	11%	3	800	± 4%
Insights West	September 12–14, 2016	Hillary Clinton	44%	Donald Trump	47%	Gary Johnson	6%	3	398	± 4.9%
Monmouth University	September 11–13, 2016	Hillary Clinton	42%	Donald Trump	44%	Gary Johnson	8%	2	406	± 4.9%

Four-way race

Poll source	Date administered	Democrat	%	Republican	%	Libertarian	%	Green	%	Lead margin	Sample size	Margin of error
Insights West	November 4–6, 2016	Hillary Clinton	46%	Donald Trump	46%	Gary Johnson	5%	Jill Stein	1%	Tied	387	± 4.9%
Gravis Marketing	November 3–6, 2016	Hillary Clinton	45%	Donald Trump	43%	Gary Johnson	4%	Jill Stein	3%	2	1,158	± 2.9%
Emerson College	November 4–5, 2016	Hillary Clinton	47%	Donald Trump	46%	Gary Johnson	4%	Jill Stein	1%	1	600	± 3.9%
Trafalgar Group	November 1–4, 2016	Hillary Clinton	45%	Donald Trump	50%	Gary Johnson	3%	Jill Stein	1%	5	1,100	± 3.02%
Emerson College	October 26–27, 2016	Hillary Clinton	44%	Donald Trump	42%	Gary Johnson	3%	Jill Stein	0%	2	550	± 4.1%
Emerson College	October 2–4, 2016	Hillary Clinton	43%	Donald Trump	43%	Gary Johnson	9%	Jill Stein	4%	Tied	700	± 3.6%
Greenberg Quinlan Rosner	September 10–19, 2016	Hillary Clinton	42%	Donald Trump	42%	Gary Johnson	7%	Jill Stein	3%	Tied	400	± 4.9%
NBC News/Wall Street Journal/Marist	September 6–8, 2016	Hillary Clinton	41%	Donald Trump	42%	Gary Johnson	8%	Jill Stein	3%	1	627	± 3.9%

Five-way race

Poll source	Date administered	Democrat	%	Republican	%	Libertarian	%	IAPN	%	Unaffiliated	%	Lead margin	Sample size	Margin of error
Suffolk University	September 27–29, 2016	Hillary Clinton	44%	Donald Trump	38%	Gary Johnson	7%	Darrell Castle	1%	Rocky De La Fuente	1%	6	500	± 4.4%

== New Hampshire ==
4 electoral votes
(Democratic in 2008) 54%–45%
(Democratic in 2012) 52%–46%

Winner
(Democratic in 2016) 48%–47%

Two-way race

Poll source	Date administered	Democrat	%	Republican	%	Lead margin	Sample size	Margin of error
UMass Lowell/7News	October 28 – November 2, 2016	Hillary Clinton	44%	Donald Trump	45%	1	695	± 4.28%
Public Policy Polling	October 31 – November 1, 2016	Hillary Clinton	48%	Donald Trump	43%	5	781	± 3.5%
MassInc/WBUR	October 29 – November 1, 2016	Hillary Clinton	42%	Donald Trump	44%	2	500	± 4.4%
NH Journal	October 26–28, 2016	Hillary Clinton	46%	Donald Trump	47%	1	408	± 5.1%
NBC News/Wall Street Journal/Marist College	October 20–24, 2016	Hillary Clinton	47%	Donald Trump	39%	8	768	±3.5%
MassInc/WBUR	October 10–12, 2016	Hillary Clinton	46%	Donald Trump	41%	5	501	± 4.4%
Public Policy Polling	October 7–9, 2016	Hillary Clinton	48%	Donald Trump	37%	11	600	± 4%
MassInc/WBUR	September 27–29, 2016	Hillary Clinton	47%	Donald Trump	38%	9	502	± 4.4%
GBA Strategies	September 25–27, 2016	Hillary Clinton	46%	Donald Trump	40%	6	600	± 4.0%
NBC News/Wall Street Journal/Marist	September 6–8, 2016	Hillary Clinton	42%	Donald Trump	41%	1	737	± 3.6%

Four-way race

Poll source	Date administered	Democrat	%	Republican	%	Libertarian	%	Green	%	Lead margin	Sample size	Margin of error
University of New Hampshire	November 3–6, 2016	Hillary Clinton	49%	Donald Trump	38%	Gary Johnson	6%	Jill Stein	1%	11	701	± 3.7%
Emerson College	November 4–5, 2016	Hillary Clinton	45%	Donald Trump	44%	Gary Johnson	5%	Jill Stein	3%	1	1,000	± 3.0%
American Research Group	October 31 – November 2, 2016	Hillary Clinton	43%	Donald Trump	48%	Gary Johnson	4%	Jill Stein	1%	5	600	± 4.0%
Suffolk University/Boston Globe	October 31 – November 2, 2016	Hillary Clinton	42%	Donald Trump	42%	Gary Johnson	5%	Jill Stein	2%	Tied	500	± 4.4%
UMass Lowell/7News	October 28 – November 2, 2016	Hillary Clinton	44%	Donald Trump	44%	Gary Johnson	5%	Jill Stein	2%	Tied	695	± 4.28%
MassInc/WBUR	October 29 – November 1, 2016	Hillary Clinton	39%	Donald Trump	40%	Gary Johnson	10%	Jill Stein	3%	1	500	± 4.4%
University of New Hampshire/WMUR	October 26–30, 2016	Hillary Clinton	46%	Donald Trump	39%	Gary Johnson	6%	Jill Stein	1%	7	641	± 3.9%
Emerson College	October 23–25, 2016	Hillary Clinton	46%	Donald Trump	43%	Gary Johnson	6%	Jill Stein	2%	3	600	± 3.9%
Monmouth University	October 22–25, 2016	Hillary Clinton	46%	Donald Trump	42%	Gary Johnson	7%	Jill Stein	1%	4	401	± 4.9%
NBC News/Wall Street Journal/Marist College	October 20–24, 2016	Hillary Clinton	45%	Donald Trump	36%	Gary Johnson	10%	Jill Stein	4%	9	768	± 3.5%
UMass Amherst/WBZ Poll	October 17–21, 2016	Hillary Clinton	43%	Donald Trump	38%	Gary Johnson	8%	Jill Stein	3%	5	772	± 4.5%
Emerson College	October 17–19, 2016	Hillary Clinton	44%	Donald Trump	36%	Gary Johnson	10%	Jill Stein	6%	8	900	± 3.2%
University of New Hampshire	October 11–17, 2016	Hillary Clinton	49%	Donald Trump	34%	Gary Johnson	8%	Jill Stein	2%	15	770	± 3.5%
MassInc/WBUR	October 10–12, 2016	Hillary Clinton	41%	Donald Trump	38%	Gary Johnson	11%	Jill Stein	3%	3	501	± 4.4%
UMass Lowell/7News	October 7–11, 2016	Hillary Clinton	45%	Donald Trump	39%	Gary Johnson	9%	Jill Stein	2%	6	517	± 4.9%
Suffolk University/Boston Globe	October 3–5, 2016	Hillary Clinton	44%	Donald Trump	42%	Gary Johnson	5%	Jill Stein	1%	2	500	± 4.4%
MassInc/WBUR	September 27–29, 2016	Hillary Clinton	42%	Donald Trump	35%	Gary Johnson	13%	Jill Stein	4%	7	502	± 4.4%
GBA Strategies	September 25–27, 2016	Hillary Clinton	43%	Donald Trump	37%	Gary Johnson	11%	Jill Stein	4%	7	600	± 4.0%
American Research Group	September 20–25, 2016	Hillary Clinton	46%	Donald Trump	42%	Gary Johnson	6%	Jill Stein	1%	4	522	± 4.2%
Monmouth University	September 17–20, 2016	Hillary Clinton	47%	Donald Trump	38%	Gary Johnson	10%	Jill Stein	1%	9	400	± 4.9%
NBC News/Wall Street Journal/Marist	September 6–8, 2016	Hillary Clinton	39%	Donald Trump	37%	Gary Johnson	15%	Jill Stein	3%	2	737	± 3.6%
Emerson College	September 3–5, 2016	Hillary Clinton	42%	Donald Trump	37%	Gary Johnson	14%	Jill Stein	4%	5	600	± 3.9%

Five-way race

Poll source	Date administered	Democrat	%	Republican	%	Libertarian	%	Green	%	Independent	%	Lead margin	Sample size	Margin of error
InsideSources/NH Journal	October 26–28, 2016	Hillary Clinton	43%	Donald Trump	45%	Gary Johnson	4%	Jill Stein	2%	Evan McMullin	1%	2	408	± 5.1%

== New Jersey ==
14 electoral votes
(Democratic in 2008) 57%–42%
(Democratic in 2012) 58%–41%

Winner
(Democratic in 2016) 55%–41%

Two-way race

Poll source	Date administered	Democrat	%	Republican	%	Lead margin	Sample size	Margin of error
Fairleigh Dickinson University	October 12–16, 2016	Hillary Clinton	51%	Donald Trump	40%	11	579	± 4.3%
Stockton College	September 22–29, 2016	Hillary Clinton	46%	Donald Trump	40%	6	638	± 3.9%

Four-way race

Poll source	Date administered	Democrat	%	Republican	%	Libertarian	%	Green	%	Lead margin	Sample size	Margin of error
Stockton University	October 27 – November 2, 2016	Hillary Clinton	51%	Donald Trump	40%	Gary Johnson	3%	Jill Stein	1%	11	678	± 3.75%
Fairleigh Dickinson University	October 12–16, 2016	Hillary Clinton	49%	Donald Trump	35%	Gary Johnson	6%	Jill Stein	4%	14	293	± 5.7%
Rutgers-Eagleton	September 6–10, 2016	Hillary Clinton	50%	Donald Trump	29%	Gary Johnson	6%	Jill Stein	4%	21	735	± 3.8%
Emerson College	September 2–5, 2016	Hillary Clinton	47%	Donald Trump	43%	Gary Johnson	5%	Jill Stein	2%	4	800	± 3.4%

== New Mexico ==
5 electoral votes
(Democratic in 2008) 57%–42%
(Democratic in 2012) 53%–43%

Winner
(Democratic in 2016) 48%–40%

Four-way race

Poll source	Date administered	Democrat	%	Republican	%	Libertarian	%	Green	%	Lead margin	Sample size	Margin of error
Zia Poll	November 6, 2016	Hillary Clinton	46%	Donald Trump	44%	Gary Johnson	6%	Jill Stein	1%	2	8,439	± 1.8%
Research & Polling Inc	November 1–3, 2016	Hillary Clinton	45%	Donald Trump	40%	Gary Johnson	11%	Jill Stein	3%	5	504	± 4.4%
Zia Poll	November 1–2, 2016	Hillary Clinton	46%	Donald Trump	43%	Gary Johnson	7%	Jill Stein	1%	3	1,102	± 3.0%
Zia Poll	October 24, 2016	Hillary Clinton	45%	Donald Trump	40%	Gary Johnson	9%	Jill Stein	2%	5	1,899	± 2.25%
Zia Poll	October 11, 2016	Hillary Clinton	46%	Donald Trump	36%	Gary Johnson	12%	Jill Stein	2%	10	1,536	± 2.5%
SurveyUSA	September 28 – October 2, 2016	Hillary Clinton	46%	Donald Trump	33%	Gary Johnson	14%	Jill Stein	2%	13	594	± 4.1%
Research & Polling Inc	September 27–29, 2016	Hillary Clinton	35%	Donald Trump	31%	Gary Johnson	24%	Jill Stein	2%	4	501	± 4.4%

== New York ==
29 electoral votes
(Democratic in 2008) 63%–36%
(Democratic in 2012) 63%–35%

Winner
(Democratic in 2016) 59%–37%

Poll source	Date administered	Democrat	%	Republican	%	Lead margin	Sample size	Margin of error
NBC 4 New York/Wall Street Journal/Marist	September 21–23, 2016	Hillary Clinton	57%	Donald Trump	33%	24	676	± 3.8%

Four-way race

Poll source	Date administered	Democrat	%	Republican	%	Libertarian Independence	%	Green	%	Lead margin	Sample size	Margin of error
Siena College	November 3–4, 2016	Hillary Clinton	51%	Donald Trump	34%	Gary Johnson	5%	Jill Stein	2%	17	617	± 4.5%
Siena College	October 13–17, 2016	Hillary Clinton	54%	Donald Trump	30%	Gary Johnson	5%	Jill Stein	4%	24	611	± 4.6%
NBC 4 New York/Wall Street Journal/Marist	September 21–23, 2016	Hillary Clinton	52%	Donald Trump	31%	Gary Johnson	7%	Jill Stein	5%	21	676	± 3.8%
Siena College	September 11–15, 2016	Hillary Clinton	51%	Donald Trump	30%	Gary Johnson	8%	Jill Stein	3%	21	600	± 5.0%

== North Carolina ==
15 electoral votes
(Democratic in 2008) 50%–49%
(Republican in 2012) 50%–48%

Winner
(Republican in 2016) 50%–46%

Poll source	Date administered	Democrat	%	Republican	%	Lead margin	Sample size	Margin of error
Quinnipiac University	November 3–6, 2016	Hillary Clinton	48%	Donald Trump	45%	3	870	± 3.3%
Public Policy Polling	October 31 – November 1, 2016	Hillary Clinton	49%	Donald Trump	47%	2	1,169	± 2.9%
Quinnipiac University	October 27 – November 1, 2016	Hillary Clinton	48%	Donald Trump	46%	2	602	± 4.0%
NBC News/Wall Street Journal/Marist	October 25–26, 2016	Hillary Clinton	50%	Donald Trump	44%	6	780	± 3.5%
Quinnipiac University	October 20–26, 2016	Hillary Clinton	50%	Donald Trump	44%	6	702	± 3.7%
New York Times Upshot/Siena College	October 20–23, 2016	Hillary Clinton	49%	Donald Trump	41%	8	792	± 3.5%
Public Policy Polling	October 21–22, 2016	Hillary Clinton	49%	Donald Trump	46%	3	875	± 3.3%
Ipsos/Reuters	October 6–19, 2016	Hillary Clinton	45%	Donald Trump	43%	2	1,233	± 3.2%
Time Warner Cable News/SurveyUSA	October 14–16, 2016	Hillary Clinton	48%	Donald Trump	46%	2	651	± 3.9%
CNN/ORC	October 10–15, 2016	Hillary Clinton	50%	Donald Trump	48%	2	788	± 3.5%
NBC News/Wall Street Journal/Marist	October 10–12, 2016	Hillary Clinton	48%	Donald Trump	43%	5	743	± 3.6%
Bloomberg/Selzer	September 29 – October 2, 2016	Hillary Clinton	46%	Donald Trump	45%	1	805	± 3.5%
Quinnipiac University	September 27 – October 2, 2016	Hillary Clinton	49%	Donald Trump	46%	3	507	± 4.4%
Public Policy Polling	September 27–28, 2016	Hillary Clinton	49%	Donald Trump	45%	4	861	± 3.3%
Fox News	September 18–20, 2016	Hillary Clinton	42%	Donald Trump	47%	5	734	± 3.9%
Public Policy Polling	September 18–20, 2016	Hillary Clinton	47%	Donald Trump	47%	Tied	1,024	± 3.1%
Greenberg Quinlan Rosner	September 10–19, 2016	Hillary Clinton	48%	Donald Trump	45%	3	400	± 4.9%

Three-way race

Poll source	Date administered	Democrat	%	Republican	%	Independent/ Third-party candidate	%	Lead margin	Sample size	Margin of error
New York Times Upshot/Siena College	November 4–6, 2016	Hillary Clinton	44%	Donald Trump	44%	Gary Johnson	3%	Tied	800	± 3.5%
Quinnipiac University	November 3–6, 2016	Hillary Clinton	47%	Donald Trump	45%	Gary Johnson	3%	2	870	± 3.3%
Remington Research Group/Axiom Strategies	November 1–2, 2016	Hillary Clinton	45%	Donald Trump	48%	Gary Johnson	3%	3	2,596	± 1.92%
Quinnipiac University	October 27 – November 1, 2016	Hillary Clinton	47%	Donald Trump	44%	Gary Johnson	3%	3	602	± 4.0%
WRAL-TV News/SurveyUSA	October 28–31, 2016	Hillary Clinton	44%	Donald Trump	51%	Gary Johnson	3%	7	659	±3.9%
Remington Research/Axiom Strategies	October 23–30, 2016	Hillary Clinton	45%	Donald Trump	47%	Gary Johnson	2%	2	1,176	± 2.85%
Emerson College	October 26–27, 2016	Hillary Clinton	48%	Donald Trump	45%	Gary Johnson	4%	3	650	± 3.8%
NBC News/Wall Street Journal/Marist	October 25–26, 2016	Hillary Clinton	47%	Donald Trump	41%	Gary Johnson	8%	6	780	± 3.5%
Quinnipiac University	October 20–26, 2016	Hillary Clinton	47%	Donald Trump	43%	Gary Johnson	5%	4	702	± 3.7%
New York Times Upshot/Siena College	October 20–23, 2016	Hillary Clinton	46%	Donald Trump	39%	Gary Johnson	8%	7	792	± 3.5%
Monmouth University	October 20–23, 2016	Hillary Clinton	47%	Donald Trump	46%	Gary Johnson	4%	1	402	± 4.9%
Public Policy Polling	October 21–22, 2016	Hillary Clinton	47%	Donald Trump	44%	Gary Johnson	4%	3	875	± 3.3%
Remington Research Group/Axiom Strategies	October 20–22, 2016	Hillary Clinton	44%	Donald Trump	47%	Gary Johnson	3%	3	1,746	± 2.33%
Civitas	October 14–17, 2016	Hillary Clinton	44%	Donald Trump	42%	Gary Johnson	5%	2	600	± 4.0%
Time Warner Cable News/SurveyUSA	October 14–16, 2016	Hillary Clinton	46%	Donald Trump	44%	Gary Johnson	6%	2	651	± 3.9%
CNN/ORC	October 10–15, 2016	Hillary Clinton	48%	Donald Trump	47%	Gary Johnson	4%	1	788	± 3.5%
NBC News/Wall Street Journal/Marist	October 10–12, 2016	Hillary Clinton	45%	Donald Trump	41%	Gary Johnson	9%	4	743	± 3.6%
Suffolk University	October 10–12, 2016	Hillary Clinton	45%	Donald Trump	43%	Gary Johnson	5%	2	500	± 4.4%
High Point University	October 1–6, 2016	Hillary Clinton	43%	Donald Trump	42%	Gary Johnson	8%	1	479	± 4.5%
WRAL-TV/SurveyUSA	September 29 – October 3, 2016	Hillary Clinton	46%	Donald Trump	44%	Gary Johnson	5%	2	656	± 3.9%
Quinnipiac University	September 27 – October 2, 2016	Hillary Clinton	46%	Donald Trump	43%	Gary Johnson	7%	3	507	± 4.4%
Public Policy Polling	September 27–28, 2016	Hillary Clinton	44%	Donald Trump	42%	Gary Johnson	7%	2	861	± 3.3%
Meredith College	September 18–22, 2016	Hillary Clinton	38%	Donald Trump	35%	Gary Johnson	6%	3	487	± 4.43%
High Point University	September 17–22, 2016	Hillary Clinton	43%	Donald Trump	42%	Gary Johnson	10%	1	404	± 4.9%
Fox News	September 18–20, 2016	Hillary Clinton	40%	Donald Trump	45%	Gary Johnson	6%	5	734	± 3.5%
Public Policy Polling	September 18–20, 2016	Hillary Clinton	43%	Donald Trump	45%	Gary Johnson	6%	2	1,024	± 3.1%
New York Times Upshot/Siena College	September 16–19, 2016	Hillary Clinton	41%	Donald Trump	41%	Gary Johnson	11%	Tied	782	± 3.6%
Civitas	September 11–12, 2016	Hillary Clinton	42%	Donald Trump	42%	Gary Johnson	5%	Tied	600	± 4%
Suffolk University	September 5–7, 2016	Hillary Clinton	41%	Donald Trump	44%	Gary Johnson	4%	3	500	± 4.4%

Four-way race

Poll source	Date administered	Democrat	%	Republican	%	Libertarian	%	Green	%	Lead margin	Sample size	Margin of error
Trafalgar Group	October 27 – November 1, 2016	Hillary Clinton	44%	Donald Trump	49%	Gary Johnson	4%	Jill Stein	0%	5	1,154	± 2.88%
CBS News/YouGov	October 26–28, 2016	Hillary Clinton	48%	Donald Trump	45%	Gary Johnson	3%	Jill Stein	0%	3	992	± 4.1%
Elon University	October 23–27, 2016	Hillary Clinton	42%	Donald Trump	41%	Gary Johnson	3%	Jill Stein	1%	1	710	± 3.7%
Ipsos/Reuters	October 6–19, 2016	Hillary Clinton	45%	Donald Trump	43%	Gary Johnson	5%	Jill Stein	1%	2	1,233	± 3.2%
Emerson College	October 10–12, 2016	Hillary Clinton	46%	Donald Trump	42%	Gary Johnson	5%	Jill Stein	3%	4	600	± 3.9%
Bloomberg/Selzer	September 29 – October 2, 2016	Hillary Clinton	44%	Donald Trump	43%	Gary Johnson	6%	Jill Stein	2%	1	805	± 3.5%
Elon University	September 27–30, 2016	Hillary Clinton	45%	Donald Trump	39%	Gary Johnson	9%	Jill Stein	0%	6	660	± 3.81%
Greenberg Quinlan Rosner	September 10–19, 2016	Hillary Clinton	44%	Donald Trump	40%	Gary Johnson	9%	Jill Stein	3%	4	400	± 4.9%
Elon University	September 12–16, 2016	Hillary Clinton	43%	Donald Trump	44%	Gary Johnson	6%	Jill Stein	0%	1	644	± 3.86%

== North Dakota ==
3 electoral votes
(Republican in 2008) 53%–45%
(Republican in 2012) 58%–39%

Winner
(Republican in 2016) 63%–27%

Four-way race

Poll source	Date administered	Democrat	%	Republican	%	Libertarian	%	Green Party	%	Lead margin	Sample size	Margin of error
DFM Research	September 12–17, 2016	Hillary Clinton	32%	Donald Trump	43%	Gary Johnson	8%	Jill Stein	1%	11	400	4.9%

== Ohio ==
18 electoral votes
(Democratic in 2008) 52%–47%
(Democratic in 2012) 51%–48%

Winner
(Republican in 2016) 51%–43%

Two-way race

Poll source	Date administered	Democrat	%	Republican	%	Lead margin	Sample size	Margin of error
Columbus Dispatch	October 27 – November 5, 2016	Hillary Clinton	48%	Donald Trump	47%	1	1,151	±2.9%
Quinnipiac University	October 27 – November 1, 2016	Hillary Clinton	44%	Donald Trump	47%	3	589	± 4.0%
Quinnipiac University	October 10–16, 2016	Hillary Clinton	47%	Donald Trump	48%	1	624	± 3.9%
CNN/ORC	October 10–15, 2016	Hillary Clinton	47%	Donald Trump	50%	3	774	± 3.5%
NBC News/Wall Street Journal/Marist	October 10–12, 2016	Hillary Clinton	45%	Donald Trump	45%	Tied	724	± 3.6%
Ipsos/Reuters	October 6–12, 2016	Hillary Clinton	44%	Donald Trump	41%	3	1,200	±3.2%
Baldwin Wallace University	October 9–11, 2016	Hillary Clinton	48%	Donald Trump	38%	10	1,152	± 3%
Public Policy Polling	October 5–6, 2016	Hillary Clinton	48%	Donald Trump	47%	1	872	± 3.5%
TargetSmart/William and Mary	October 3–6, 2016	Hillary Clinton	46%	Donald Trump	43%	3	812	± %
Anzalone Liszt Grove	September 27 – October 2, 2016	Hillary Clinton	46%	Donald Trump	44%	2	800	± 3.46%
Quinnipiac University	September 27 – October 2, 2016	Hillary Clinton	46%	Donald Trump	49%	3	497	± 4.4%
Target Smart/William & Mary	September 15–22, 2016	Hillary Clinton	43%	Donald Trump	40%	3	652	± %
Fox News	September 18–20, 2016	Hillary Clinton	40%	Donald Trump	45%	5	737	± 3.5%
Greenberg Quinlan Rosner	September 10–19, 2016	Hillary Clinton	46%	Donald Trump	46%	Tied	400	± 4.9%
Bloomberg/Selzer	September 9–12, 2016	Hillary Clinton	43%	Donald Trump	48%	5	802	± 3.5%
CNN/ORC	September 7–12, 2016	Hillary Clinton	46%	Donald Trump	50%	4	769	± 3.5%

Three-way race

Poll source	Date administered	Democrat	%	Republican	%	Libertarian	%	Lead margin	Sample size	Margin of error
Remington Research Group/Axiom Strategies	November 1–2, 2016	Hillary Clinton	44%	Donald Trump	45%	Gary Johnson	4%	1	2,557	± 1.94%
Remington Research/Axiom Strategies	October 23–30, 2016	Hillary Clinton	43%	Donald Trump	48%	Gary Johnson	3%	5	1,187	± 2.84%
Remington Research Group/Axiom Strategies	October 20–22, 2016	Hillary Clinton	42%	Donald Trump	46%	Gary Johnson	4%	4	1,971	± 2.2%

Four-way race

Poll source	Date administered	Democrat	%	Republican	%	Libertarian	%	Green	%	Lead margin	Sample size	Margin of error
Emerson College	November 4–5, 2016	Hillary Clinton	39%	Donald Trump	46%	Gary Johnson	7%	Jill Stein	3%	7	900	± 3.2%
CBS News/YouGov	November 2–4, 2016	Hillary Clinton	45%	Donald Trump	46%	Gary Johnson	3%	Jill Stein	2%	1	1,189	± 4.1%
TargetSmart/William and Mary	October 31 – November 3, 2016	Hillary Clinton	40%	Donald Trump	43%	Gary Johnson	8%	Jill Stein	3%	3	844	± %
Quinnipiac University	October 27 – November 1, 2016	Hillary Clinton	41%	Donald Trump	46%	Gary Johnson	5%	Jill Stein	2%	5	589	± 4.0%
Emerson College	October 26–27, 2016	Hillary Clinton	45%	Donald Trump	45%	Gary Johnson	6%	Jill Stein	1%	Tied	800	± 3.4%
Trafalgar Group	October 24–26, 2016	Hillary Clinton	44%	Donald Trump	49%	Gary Johnson	2%	Jill Stein	1%	5	1150	± 2.89%
Quinnipiac University	October 10–16, 2016	Hillary Clinton	45%	Donald Trump	45%	Gary Johnson	6%	Jill Stein	1%	Tied	624	± 3.9%
CNN/ORC	October 10–15, 2016	Hillary Clinton	44%	Donald Trump	48%	Gary Johnson	4%	Jill Stein	2%	4	774	± 3.5%
NBC News/Wall Street Journal/Marist	October 10–12, 2016	Hillary Clinton	41%	Donald Trump	42%	Gary Johnson	9%	Jill Stein	4%	1	724	± 3.6%
Emerson College	October 10–12, 2016	Hillary Clinton	45%	Donald Trump	43%	Gary Johnson	7%	Jill Stein	2%	2	600	± 3.9%
Ipsos/Reuters	October 6–12, 2016	Hillary Clinton	43%	Donald Trump	39%	Gary Johnson	8%	Jill Stein	2%	4	1,200	± 3.2%
Baldwin Wallace University	October 9–11, 2016	Hillary Clinton	43%	Donald Trump	34%	Gary Johnson	10%	Jill Stein	3%	9	1,152	± 3%
CBS News/YouGov	October 5–7, 2016	Hillary Clinton	46%	Donald Trump	42%	Gary Johnson	5%	Jill Stein	2%	4	997	± 3.9%
Public Policy Polling	October 5–6, 2016	Hillary Clinton	44%	Donald Trump	43%	Gary Johnson	5%	Jill Stein	2%	1	872	± 3.5%
TargetSmart/William and Mary	October 3–6, 2016	Hillary Clinton	44%	Donald Trump	42%	Gary Johnson	5%	Jill Stein	1%	2	812	± %
Monmouth University	October 1–4, 2016	Hillary Clinton	44%	Donald Trump	42%	Gary Johnson	5%	Jill Stein	1%	2	405	± 4.9%
Anzalone Liszt Grove	September 27 – October 2, 2016	Hillary Clinton	44%	Donald Trump	42%	Gary Johnson	8%	Jill Stein	1%	2	800	± 3.46%
Quinnipiac University	September 27 – October 2, 2016	Hillary Clinton	42%	Donald Trump	47%	Gary Johnson	6%	Jill Stein	1%	5	497	± 4.4%
Target Smart/William & Mary	September 15–22, 2016	Hillary Clinton	40%	Donald Trump	37%	Gary Johnson	8%	Jill Stein	2%	3	652	± %
Fox News	September 18–20, 2016	Hillary Clinton	37%	Donald Trump	42%	Gary Johnson	6%	Jill Stein	2%	5	737	± 3.5%
Greenberg Quinlan Rosner	September 10–19, 2016	Hillary Clinton	39%	Donald Trump	41%	Gary Johnson	11%	Jill Stein	4%	2	400	± 4.9%
Bloomberg/Selzer	September 9–12, 2016	Hillary Clinton	39%	Donald Trump	44%	Gary Johnson	10%	Jill Stein	3%	5	802	± 3.5%
CNN/ORC	September 7–12, 2016	Hillary Clinton	41%	Donald Trump	46%	Gary Johnson	8%	Jill Stein	2%	5	769	± 3.5%
CBS News/YouGov	September 7–9, 2016	Hillary Clinton	46%	Donald Trump	39%	Gary Johnson	7%	Jill Stein	2%	7	994	± 3.9%

Five-way race

Poll source	Date administered	Democrat	%	Republican	%	Libertarian	%	Green	%	Independent	%	Lead margin	Sample size	Margin of error
Suffolk University	October 17–19, 2016	Hillary Clinton	45%	Donald Trump	45%	Gary Johnson	2%	Jill Stein	1%	Richard Duncan	1%	Tied	500	± 4.4%
Suffolk University	September 12–14, 2016	Hillary Clinton	39%	Donald Trump	42%	Gary Johnson	4%	Jill Stein	1%	Richard Duncan	1%	3	500	± 4.4%

== Oklahoma ==
7 electoral votes
(Republican in 2008) 66%–34%
(Republican in 2012) 67%–33%

Winner
(Republican in 2016) 65%–29%

Three-way race

Poll source	Date administered	Democrat	%	Republican	%	Libertarian	%	Lead margin	Sample size	Margin of error
SoonerPoll	October 18–20, 2016	Hillary Clinton	30%	Donald Trump	60%	Gary Johnson	5%	30	530	± 4.26%
SoonerPoll	September 13–15, 2016	Hillary Clinton	36%	Donald Trump	51%	Gary Johnson	6%	15	515	± 4.32%

== Oregon ==
7 electoral votes
(Democratic in 2008) 57%–40%
(Democratic in 2012) 54%–42%

Winner
(Democratic in 2016) 50%–39%

Four-way race

Poll source	Date administered	Democrat	%	Republican	%	Libertarian	%	Green	%	Lead margin	Sample size	Margin of error
Fox 12/Davis, Hibbitts & Midghall, Inc.	October 24–29, 2016	Hillary Clinton	41%	Donald Trump	34%	Gary Johnson	4%	Jill Stein	2%	7	504	± 4.4%
Riley Research/KGW	October 4–14, 2016	Hillary Clinton	46%	Donald Trump	36%	Gary Johnson	5%	Jill Stein	5%	10	608	± 3.97%
DHM Research	October 6–13, 2016	Hillary Clinton	43%	Donald Trump	36%	Gary Johnson	7%	Jill Stein	5%	7	600	± 4.0%
KATU-TV/SurveyUSA	October 10–12, 2016	Hillary Clinton	48%	Donald Trump	38%	Gary Johnson	6%	Jill Stein	4%	10	654	± 3.9%
Hoffman Research	September 29 – October 1, 2016	Hillary Clinton	45%	Donald Trump	33%	Gary Johnson	8%	Jill Stein	3%	12	605	± 4%
iCitizen	September 2–7, 2016	Hillary Clinton	43%	Donald Trump	28%	Gary Johnson	11%	Jill Stein	3%	15	610	± 4.0%
DHM Research	September 1–6, 2016	Hillary Clinton	38%	Donald Trump	25%	Gary Johnson	10%	Jill Stein	3%	13	517	± 4.3%

== Pennsylvania ==
20 electoral votes
(Democratic in 2008) 54%–44%
(Democratic in 2012) 52%–47%

Winner
(Republican in 2016) 48%–47%

Poll source	Date administered	Democrat	%	Republican	%	Lead margin	Sample size	Margin of error
Morning Call/Muhlenberg College	October 30 – November 4, 2016	Hillary Clinton	48%	Donald Trump	42%	6	420	± 5.5%
Public Policy Polling	October 31 – November 1, 2016	Hillary Clinton	48%	Donald Trump	44%	4	1,050	± 3.0%
CNN/ORC	October 27 – November 1, 2016	Hillary Clinton	51%	Donald Trump	46%	5	799	± 3.5%
Quinnipiac University	October 27 – November 1, 2016	Hillary Clinton	50%	Donald Trump	44%	6	612	± 4.0%
Gravis Marketing/One America News Network	October 31, 2016	Hillary Clinton	51%	Donald Trump	49%	2	2,606	± 1.9%
Morning Call/Muhlenberg College	October 20–26, 2016	Hillary Clinton	46%	Donald Trump	41%	5	420	± 5.5%
Ipsos/Reuters	October 6–17, 2016	Hillary Clinton	45%	Donald Trump	39%	6	1,467	±2.9%
Quinnipiac University	October 10–16, 2016	Hillary Clinton	51%	Donald Trump	45%	6	660	± 3.8%
Bloomberg/Selzer	October 7–11, 2016	Hillary Clinton	51%	Donald Trump	42%	9	806	± 3.5%
NBC News/Wall Street Journal/Marist	October 3–6, 2016	Hillary Clinton	51%	Donald Trump	39%	12	709	± 3.7%
Quinnipiac University	September 27 – October 2, 2016	Hillary Clinton	48%	Donald Trump	43%	5	535	± 4.2%
Public Policy Polling	September 27–28, 2016	Hillary Clinton	49%	Donald Trump	44%	5	886	± 3.3%
CNN/ORC	September 20–25, 2016	Hillary Clinton	50%	Donald Trump	47%	3	771	± 3.5%
Morning Call/Muhlenberg College	September 19–23, 2016	Hillary Clinton	44%	Donald Trump	41%	3	486	± 5.0%
Greenberg Quinlan Rosner	September 10–19, 2016	Hillary Clinton	51%	Donald Trump	42%	9	400	± 4.9%
Morning Call/Muhlenberg College	September 12–16, 2016	Hillary Clinton	47%	Donald Trump	38%	9	405	± 5.5%

Three-way race

Poll source	Date administered	Democrat	%	Republican	%	Libertarian	%	Lead margin	Sample size	Margin of error
Remington Research Group/Axiom Strategies	November 1–2, 2016	Hillary Clinton	46%	Donald Trump	45%	Gary Johnson	4%	1	2,683	± 1.89%
Remington Research/Axiom Strategies	October 30, 2016	Hillary Clinton	45%	Donald Trump	43%	Gary Johnson	3%	2	1,249	± 2.77%
Remington Research Group/Axiom Strategies	October 20–22, 2016	Hillary Clinton	45%	Donald Trump	42%	Gary Johnson	5%	3	1,997	± 2.19%

Four-way race

Poll source	Date administered	Democrat	%	Republican	%	Libertarian	%	Green	%	Lead margin	Sample size	Margin of error
Gravis Marketing	November 3–6, 2016	Hillary Clinton	46%	Donald Trump	40%	Gary Johnson	7%	Jill Stein	2%	6	1,220	± 2.8%
Trafalgar Group	November 3–5, 2016	Hillary Clinton	47%	Donald Trump	48%	Gary Johnson	2%	Jill Stein	1%	1	1,300	± 2.68%
Morning Call/Muhlenberg College	October 30 – November 4, 2016	Hillary Clinton	44%	Donald Trump	40%	Gary Johnson	7%	Jill Stein	2%	4	405	± 5.5%
Harper Polling	November 2–3, 2016	Hillary Clinton	46%	Donald Trump	46%	Gary Johnson	2%	Jill Stein	1%	Tied	504	± 4.4%
Susquehanna Polling & Research, Inc	October 31 – November 1, 2016	Hillary Clinton	45%	Donald Trump	43%	Gary Johnson	2%	Jill Stein	2%	2	681	± 3.76%
Monmouth University	October 29 – November 1, 2016	Hillary Clinton	48%	Donald Trump	44%	Gary Johnson	3%	Jill Stein	1%	4	403	± 4.9%
CNN/ORC	October 27 – November 1, 2016	Hillary Clinton	48%	Donald Trump	44%	Gary Johnson	5%	Jill Stein	3%	4	799	± 3.5%
Quinnipiac University	October 27 – November 1, 2016	Hillary Clinton	48%	Donald Trump	43%	Gary Johnson	3%	Jill Stein	3%	5	612	± 4.0%
Gravis Marketing/One America News Network	October 31, 2016	Hillary Clinton	47%	Donald Trump	46%	Gary Johnson	3%	Jill Stein	2%	1	2,606	± 1.9%
Franklin & Marshall College	October 26–30, 2016	Hillary Clinton	49%	Donald Trump	38%	Gary Johnson	4%	Jill Stein	2%	11	652	± 5.1%
CBS News/YouGov	October 26–28, 2016	Hillary Clinton	48%	Donald Trump	40%	Gary Johnson	5%	Jill Stein	2%	8	1,091	± 3.7%
Emerson College	October 25–26, 2016	Hillary Clinton	48%	Donald Trump	43%	Gary Johnson	6%	Jill Stein	0%	5	550	± 4.1%
Morning Call/Muhlenberg College	October 20–26, 2016	Hillary Clinton	45%	Donald Trump	39%	Gary Johnson	8%	Jill Stein	2%	6	420	± 5.5%
New York Times Upshot/Siena College	October 23–25, 2016	Hillary Clinton	46%	Donald Trump	39%	Gary Johnson	6%	Jill Stein	3%	7	824	± 3.4%
Emerson College	October 17–19, 2016	Hillary Clinton	45%	Donald Trump	41%	Gary Johnson	4%	Jill Stein	4%	4	800	± 3.4%
Ipsos/Reuters	October 6–17, 2016	Hillary Clinton	45%	Donald Trump	38%	Gary Johnson	6%	Jill Stein	2%	7	1,467	± 2.9%
Quinnipiac University	October 10–16, 2016	Hillary Clinton	47%	Donald Trump	41%	Gary Johnson	6%	Jill Stein	1%	6	660	± 3.8%
Bloomberg/Selzer	October 7–11, 2016	Hillary Clinton	48%	Donald Trump	39%	Gary Johnson	6%	Jill Stein	4%	9	806	± 3.5%
Lucid/The Times-Picayune	October 7–10, 2016	Hillary Clinton	46%	Donald Trump	39%	Gary Johnson	6%	Jill Stein	2%	7	1,747	± %
Susquehanna Polling & Research, Inc	October 4–9, 2016	Hillary Clinton	44%	Donald Trump	40%	Gary Johnson	4%	Jill Stein	2%	4	764	± 3.5%
CBS News/YouGov	October 5–7, 2016	Hillary Clinton	48%	Donald Trump	40%	Gary Johnson	4%	Jill Stein	2%	8	997	± 4.2%
NBC News/Wall Street Journal/Marist	October 3–6, 2016	Hillary Clinton	49%	Donald Trump	37%	Gary Johnson	6%	Jill Stein	4%	12	709	± 3.7%
Monmouth University	September 30 – October 3, 2016	Hillary Clinton	50%	Donald Trump	40%	Gary Johnson	5%	Jill Stein	2%	10	402	± 4.9%
Franklin & Marshall College	September 28 – October 2, 2016	Hillary Clinton	47%	Donald Trump	38%	Gary Johnson	5%	Jill Stein	0%	9	496	± 6.1%
Quinnipiac University	September 27 – October 2, 2016	Hillary Clinton	45%	Donald Trump	41%	Gary Johnson	5%	Jill Stein	2%	4	535	± 4.2%
Public Policy Polling	September 27–28, 2016	Hillary Clinton	45%	Donald Trump	39%	Gary Johnson	6%	Jill Stein	2%	6	886	± 3.3%
CNN/ORC	September 20–25, 2016	Hillary Clinton	45%	Donald Trump	44%	Gary Johnson	6%	Jill Stein	3%	1	771	± 3.5%
Morning Call/Muhlenberg College	September 19–23, 2016	Hillary Clinton	40%	Donald Trump	38%	Gary Johnson	8%	Jill Stein	3%	2	486	± 5.0%
Mercyhurst University	September 12–23, 2016	Hillary Clinton	42%	Donald Trump	41%	Gary Johnson	4%	Jill Stein	3%	1	420	± 4.8%
Harper Polling	September 21–22, 2016	Hillary Clinton	45%	Donald Trump	43%	Gary Johnson	8%	Jill Stein	1%	2	500	± 4.4%
Greenberg Quinlan Rosner	September 10–19, 2016	Hillary Clinton	46%	Donald Trump	38%	Gary Johnson	8%	Jill Stein	3%	8	400	± 4.9%
Morning Call/Muhlenberg College	September 12–16, 2016	Hillary Clinton	40%	Donald Trump	32%	Gary Johnson	14%	Jill Stein	5%	8	405	± 5.5%

== Rhode Island ==
4 electoral votes
(Democratic in 2008) 63%–35%
(Democratic in 2012) 63%–35%

Winner
(Democratic in 2016) 54%–39%

Four-way race

Poll source	Date administered	Democrat	%	Republican	%	Libertarian	%	Green	%	Lead margin	Sample size	Margin of error
Emerson College	October 2–4, 2016	Hillary Clinton	52%	Donald Trump	32%	Gary Johnson	5%	Jill Stein	5%	20	600	± 3.9%
Emerson College	September 2–5, 2016	Hillary Clinton	44%	Donald Trump	41%	Gary Johnson	8%	Jill Stein	4%	3	800	± 3.4%

== South Carolina ==
9 electoral votes
(Republican in 2008) 54%–45%
(Republican in 2012) 55%–44%

Winner
(Republican in 2016) 55%–41%

Three-way race

Poll source	Date administered	Democrat	%	Republican	%	Libertarian	%	Lead margin	Sample size	Margin of error
Starboard Communications	September 7–9, 2016	Hillary Clinton	35%	Donald Trump	48%	Gary Johnson	7%	13	600	± 4.8%

Four-way race

Poll source	Date administered	Democrat	%	Republican	%	Libertarian	%	Green	%	Independent	%	Lead margin	Sample size	Margin of error
Starboard Communications	October 30–31, 2016	Hillary Clinton	36%	Donald Trump	47%	Gary Johnson	3%			Evan McMullin	1%	11	600	± 4.4%
Winthrop University	September 18–26, 2016	Hillary Clinton	38%	Donald Trump	42%	Gary Johnson	6%	Jill Stein	3%			4	475	± 4.5%
Trafalgar Group	September 6–12, 2016	Hillary Clinton	38%	Donald Trump	53%	Gary Johnson	3%	Jill Stein	1%			15	1,247	± 2.77%

== South Dakota ==
3 electoral votes
(Republican in 2008) 53%–45%
(Republican in 2012) 58%–40%

Winner
(Republican in 2016) 62%–32%

Three-way race

Poll source	Date administered	Democrat	%	Republican	%	Libertarian	%	Lead margin	Sample size	Margin of error
Mason-Dixon	October 18–20, 2016	Hillary Clinton	37%	Donald Trump	44%	Gary Johnson	7%	7	400	5.0%

Four-way race

Poll source	Date administered	Democrat	%	Republican	%	Libertarian	%	Other candidate	%	Lead margin	Sample size	Margin of error
Nielson Brothers Polling	October 24–26, 2016	Hillary Clinton	35%	Donald Trump	49%	Gary Johnson	7%	Darrell Castle	1%	14	600	4%
Remington Research Group	October 19–21, 2016	Hillary Clinton	37%	Donald Trump	48%	Gary Johnson	6%	Darrell Castle	2%	11	1,115	2.93%

== Tennessee ==
11 electoral votes
(Republican in 2008) 57%–42%
(Republican in 2012) 59%–39%

Winner
(Republican in 2016) 61%–35%

Poll source	Date administered	Democrat	%	Republican	%	Lead margin	Sample size	Margin of error
MTSU	September 28 – October 2, 2016	Hillary Clinton	40%	Donald Trump	50%	10	472	± 5.0%

Four-way race

Poll source	Date administered	Democrat	%	Republican	%	Libertarian	%	Green	%	Lead margin	Sample size	Margin of error
iCitizen	October 14–17, 2016	Hillary Clinton	34%	Donald Trump	44%	Gary Johnson	7%	Jill Stein	2%	10	508	± 4.4%
MTSU	September 28 – October 2, 2016	Hillary Clinton	38%	Donald Trump	50%	Gary Johnson	5%	Jill Stein	1%	12	472	± 5.0%
Vanderbilt University	September 19 – October 2, 2016	Hillary Clinton	33%	Donald Trump	44%	Gary Johnson	7%	Jill Stein	1%	11	1000	± 3.4%

== Texas ==
38 electoral votes
(Republican in 2008) 55%–44%
(Republican in 2012) 57%–41%

Winner
(Republican in 2016) 52%–43%

Two-way race

Poll source	Date administered	Democrat	%	Republican	%	Lead margin	Sample size	Margin of error
NBC News/Wall Street Journal/Marist	October 30 – November 1, 2016	Hillary Clinton	41%	Donald Trump	49%	8	679	± 3.8%
Texas Lyceum	September 1–11, 2016	Hillary Clinton	36%	Donald Trump	42%	6	502	± 4.37%

Three-way race

Poll source	Date administered	Democrat	%	Republican	%	Libertarian	%	Lead margin	Sample size	Margin of error
Austin American-Statesman/Crosswind	October 22–24, 2016	Hillary Clinton	38%	Donald Trump	45%	Gary Johnson	7%	7	800	± 3.5%

Four-way race

Poll source	Date administered	Democrat	%	Republican	%	Libertarian	%	Green	%	Lead margin	Sample size	Margin of error
Emerson College	October 31 – November 1, 2016	Hillary Clinton	35%	Donald Trump	49%	Gary Johnson	5%	Jill Stein	4%	14	700	± 3.6%
NBC News/Wall Street Journal/Marist	October 30 – November 1, 2016	Hillary Clinton	40%	Donald Trump	49%	Gary Johnson	6%	Jill Stein	2%	9	679	± 3.8%
KTVT-CBS 11/Dixie Strategies Poll	October 27–29, 2016	Hillary Clinton	39%	Donald Trump	52%	Gary Johnson	3%	Jill Stein	0%	13	980	± 3.13%
Texas Tribune/University of Texas	October 14–23, 2016	Hillary Clinton	42%	Donald Trump	45%	Gary Johnson	7%	Jill Stein	2%	3	959	± 3.16%
CBS News/YouGov	October 20–21, 2016	Hillary Clinton	43%	Donald Trump	46%	Gary Johnson	5%	Jill Stein	1%	3	1,031	± 4.4%
University of Houston	October 7–15, 2016	Hillary Clinton	38%	Donald Trump	41%	Gary Johnson	4%	Jill Stein	1%	3	1,000	± 3.0%
SurveyUSA/TEGNA	October 10–12, 2016	Hillary Clinton	43%	Donald Trump	47%	Gary Johnson	3%	Jill Stein	1%	4	638	± 4.0%
KTVT-CBS 11/Dixie Strategies Poll	September 29 – October 1, 2016	Hillary Clinton	38%	Donald Trump	45%	Gary Johnson	4%	Jill Stein	1%	7	780	± 3.5%
Texas Lyceum	September 1–11, 2016	Hillary Clinton	32%	Donald Trump	39%	Gary Johnson	9%	Jill Stein	3%	7	502	± 4.37%
Emerson College	September 7–10, 2016	Hillary Clinton	36%	Donald Trump	42%	Gary Johnson	10%	Jill Stein	6%	6	700	± 3.6%

== Utah ==
6 electoral votes
(Republican in 2008) 62%–34%
(Republican in 2012) 73%–25%

Winner
(Republican in 2016) 46%–28%

Four-way race

Poll source	Date administered	Democrat	%	Republican	%	Libertarian	%	Independent	%	Lead margin	Sample size	Margin of error
Trafalgar Group	November 3–5, 2016	Hillary Clinton	30%	Donald Trump	40%	Gary Johnson	4%	Evan McMullin	25%	10	1,352	± 2.67%
Rasmussen Reports	October 29–31, 2016	Hillary Clinton	31%	Donald Trump	42%	Gary Johnson	3%	Evan McMullin	21%	11	750	± 4.0%
Rasmussen Reports	October 23–24, 2016	Hillary Clinton	28%	Donald Trump	32%	Gary Johnson	4%	Evan McMullin	29%	3	750	± 4.0%

Five-way race

Poll source	Date administered	Democrat	%	Republican	%	Libertarian	%	Green	%	Independent	%	Lead margin	Sample size	Margin of error
Y2 Analytics	November 1–3, 2016	Hillary Clinton	24%	Donald Trump	33%	Gary Johnson	5%	Jill Stein	3%	Evan McMullin	28%	5	500	± 4.38%
Emerson College	November 1–2, 2016	Hillary Clinton	20%	Donald Trump	40%	Gary Johnson	3%	Jill Stein	2%	Evan McMullin	28%	12	1,000	± 3.0%
Monmouth University	October 30 – November 2, 2016	Hillary Clinton	31%	Donald Trump	37%	Gary Johnson	4%	Jill Stein	1%	Evan McMullin	24%	6	402	± 4.9%
Gravis Marketing	October 30–31, 2016	Hillary Clinton	29%	Donald Trump	35%	Gary Johnson	3%	Jill Stein	1%	Evan McMullin	24%	6	1,424	± 2.6%
Dan Jones & Associates	October 20–27, 2016	Hillary Clinton	24%	Donald Trump	32%	Gary Johnson	4%	Jill Stein	1%	Evan McMullin	30%	2	823	± 3.42%
Emerson College	October 17–19, 2016	Hillary Clinton	24%	Donald Trump	27%	Gary Johnson	5%	Jill Stein	0%	Evan McMullin	31%	4	700	± 3.6%
Rasmussen Reports	October 15–16, 2016	Hillary Clinton	28%	Donald Trump	30%	Gary Johnson	5%	Jill Stein	1%	Evan McMullin	29%	1	750	± 4.0%
CBS News/YouGov	October 12–14, 2016	Hillary Clinton	20%	Donald Trump	37%	Gary Johnson	7%	Jill Stein	1%	Evan McMullin	20%	17	951	± 5.7%
Monmouth University	October 10–12, 2016	Hillary Clinton	28%	Donald Trump	34%	Gary Johnson	9%	Jill Stein	1%	Evan McMullin	20%	6	403	± 4.9%
Y2 Analytics	October 10–11, 2016	Hillary Clinton	26%	Donald Trump	26%	Gary Johnson	14%	Jill Stein	1%	Evan McMullin	22%	Tied	500	± 4.4%
Dan Jones & Associates	September 12–19, 2016	Hillary Clinton	25%	Donald Trump	34%	Gary Johnson	13%	Jill Stein	1%	Evan McMullin	12%	9	820	± 3.4%

Six-way race

Poll source	Date administered	Democrat	%	Republican	%	Libertarian	%	Green	%	Constitution	%	Independent	%	Lead margin	Sample size	Margin of error
Dan Jones & Associates	October 12–18, 2016	Hillary Clinton	25%	Donald Trump	30%	Gary Johnson	5%	Jill Stein	1%	Darrell Castle	1%	Evan McMullin	29%	1	818	± 3.97%
Dan Jones & Associates	September 1–9, 2016	Hillary Clinton	24%	Donald Trump	39%	Gary Johnson	13%	Jill Stein	0%	Darrell Castle	2%	Evan McMullin	9%	15	605	± 3.98%

== Vermont ==
3 electoral votes
(Democratic in 2008) 67%–30%
(Democratic in 2012) 67%–31%

Winner
(Democratic in 2016) 56%–30%

Four-way race

Poll source	Date administered	Democrat	%	Republican	%	Libertarian	%	Green	%	Lead margin	Sample size	Margin of error
RRH Elections	October 24–26, 2016	Hillary Clinton	52%	Donald Trump	26%	Gary Johnson	5%	Jill Stein	2%	26	1,052	± 3.0%
WCAX	October 19–22, 2016	Hillary Clinton	50%	Donald Trump	22%	Gary Johnson	7%	Jill Stein	5%	28	603	± 3.99%
Castleton University/Vermont Public Radio	September 29 – October 14, 2016	Hillary Clinton	45%	Donald Trump	17%	Gary Johnson	4%	Jill Stein	3%	28	650	± 3.9%
Emerson College	September 2–5, 2016	Hillary Clinton	47%	Donald Trump	26%	Gary Johnson	13%	Jill Stein	7%	21	600	± 3.9%

== Virginia ==
13 electoral votes
(Democratic in 2008) 53%–46%
(Democratic in 2012) 51%–47%

Winner
(Democratic in 2016) 50%–44%

Two-way race

Poll source	Date administered	Democrat	%	Republican	%	Lead margin	Sample size	Margin of error
Public Policy Polling	November 3–4, 2016	Hillary Clinton	51%	Donald Trump	45%	6	1,238	± 2.8%
Roanoke College	October 29 – November 1, 2016	Hillary Clinton	49%	Donald Trump	40%	9	654	± 3.8%
Washington Post/Schar School	October 27–30, 2016	Hillary Clinton	51%	Donald Trump	45%	6	1,024	± 3.5%
Hampton University	October 26–30, 2016	Hillary Clinton	41%	Donald Trump	44%	3	802	± 4.57%
Winthrop University	October 23–30, 2016	Hillary Clinton	49%	Donald Trump	43%	6	712	± 3.6%
Quinnipiac University	October 20–26, 2016	Hillary Clinton	53%	Donald Trump	40%	13	749	± 3.6%
Hampton University	September 28 – October 2, 2016	Hillary Clinton	46%	Donald Trump	34%	12	800	± 4.4%
Public Policy Polling	September 27–28, 2016	Hillary Clinton	49%	Donald Trump	43%	6	811	± 3.4%
Christopher Newport University	September 15–23, 2016	Hillary Clinton	48%	Donald Trump	38%	10	1,003	± 3.9%
Quinnipiac University	September 13–21, 2016	Hillary Clinton	50%	Donald Trump	43%	7	659	± 3.8%
Roanoke College	September 11–20, 2016	Hillary Clinton	51%	Donald Trump	40%	11	841	± 3.4%
University of Mary Washington	September 6–12, 2016	Hillary Clinton	46%	Donald Trump	41%	5	685	± 4.4%
Public Policy Polling	September 9–11, 2016	Hillary Clinton	50%	Donald Trump	42%	8	878	± 3.3%

Three-way race

Poll source	Date administered	Democrat	%	Republican	%	Independent/ Third-party candidate	%	Lead margin	Sample size	Margin of error
Remington Research Group/Axiom Strategies	November 1–2, 2016	Hillary Clinton	46%	Donald Trump	44%	Gary Johnson	4%	2	3,076	± 1.77%
Remington Research Group/Axiom Strategies	October 23–30, 2016	Hillary Clinton	48%	Donald Trump	43%	Gary Johnson	3%	5	1,106	± 2.94%
Remington Research Group/Axiom Strategies	October 20–22, 2016	Hillary Clinton	48%	Donald Trump	43%	Gary Johnson	3%	5	1,787	± 2.31%
Emerson College	October 10–12, 2016	Hillary Clinton	46%	Donald Trump	43%	Gary Johnson	6%	3	600	± 3.9%

Four-way race

Poll source	Date administered	Democrat	%	Republican	%	Libertarian	%	Green	%	Lead margin	Sample size	Margin of error
Emerson College	October 28–30, 2016	Hillary Clinton	49%	Donald Trump	45%	Gary Johnson	3%	Jill Stein	1%	4	800	± 3.4%
Washington Post/Schar School	October 27–30, 2016	Hillary Clinton	48%	Donald Trump	42%	Gary Johnson	6%	Jill Stein	2%	6	1,024	± 3.5%
Quinnipiac University	October 20–26, 2016	Hillary Clinton	50%	Donald Trump	38%	Gary Johnson	4%	Jill Stein	2%	12	749	± 3.6%
Public Policy Polling	September 27–28, 2016	Hillary Clinton	46%	Donald Trump	40%	Gary Johnson	7%	Jill Stein	1%	6	811	± 3.4%
CBS News/YouGov	September 21–23, 2016	Hillary Clinton	45%	Donald Trump	37%	Gary Johnson	7%	Jill Stein	1%	8	1,237	± 3.3%
Quinnipiac University	September 13–21, 2016	Hillary Clinton	45%	Donald Trump	39%	Gary Johnson	8%	Jill Stein	1%	6	659	± 3.8%
Roanoke College	September 11–20, 2016	Hillary Clinton	44%	Donald Trump	37%	Gary Johnson	8%	Jill Stein	1%	7	841	± 3.4%
Public Policy Polling	September 9–11, 2016	Hillary Clinton	45%	Donald Trump	39%	Gary Johnson	6%	Jill Stein	2%	6	878	± 3.3%

Five-way race

Poll source	Date administered	Democrat	%	Republican	%	Libertarian	%	Green	%	Independent	%	Lead margin	Sample size	Margin of error
Christopher Newport University	November 1–6, 2016	Hillary Clinton	48%	Donald Trump	42%	Gary Johnson	3%	Jill Stein	<1%	Evan McMullin	2%	6	1,193	± 3.6%
Public Policy Polling	November 3–4, 2016	Hillary Clinton	48%	Donald Trump	43%	Gary Johnson	4%	Jill Stein	1%	Evan McMullin	1%	5	1,238	± 2.8%
Roanoke College	October 29 – November 1, 2016	Hillary Clinton	45%	Donald Trump	38%	Gary Johnson	5%	Jill Stein	2%	Evan McMullin	1%	7	654	± 3.8%
Winthrop University	October 23–30, 2016	Hillary Clinton	44%	Donald Trump	39%	Gary Johnson	5%	Jill Stein	2%	Evan McMullin	2%	5	712	± 3.6%
Christopher Newport University	October 23–26, 2016	Hillary Clinton	46%	Donald Trump	39%	Gary Johnson	5%	Jill Stein	1%	Evan McMullin	1%	7	814	± 4.2%
Christopher Newport University	October 16–19, 2016	Hillary Clinton	45%	Donald Trump	33%	Gary Johnson	8%	Jill Stein	1%	Evan McMullin	3%	12	834	± 3.9%
Tarrance Group	October 12–15, 2016	Hillary Clinton	47%	Donald Trump	38%	Gary Johnson	3%	Jill Stein	1%	Evan McMullin	2%	9	500	± 4.1%
Christopher Newport University	October 11–14, 2016	Hillary Clinton	44%	Donald Trump	29%	Gary Johnson	11%	Jill Stein	2%	Evan McMullin	3%	15	809	± 3.6%
Roanoke College	October 2–6, 2016	Hillary Clinton	45%	Donald Trump	36%	Gary Johnson	7%	Jill Stein	1%	Evan McMullin	1%	9	814	± 3.4%
Christopher Newport University	September 27–30, 2016	Hillary Clinton	42%	Donald Trump	35%	Gary Johnson	12%	Jill Stein	1%	Evan McMullin	2%	7	892	± 3.7%
Christopher Newport University	September 15–23, 2016	Hillary Clinton	39%	Donald Trump	33%	Gary Johnson	15%	Jill Stein	3%	Evan McMullin	3%	6	1,003	± 3.9%
University of Mary Washington	September 6–12, 2016	Hillary Clinton	40%	Donald Trump	37%	Gary Johnson	8%	Jill Stein	1%	Evan McMullin	3%	3	685	± 4.4%

== Washington ==
12 electoral votes
(Democratic in 2008) 57%–40%
(Democratic in 2012) 56%–41%

Winner
(Democratic in 2016) 54%–38%

Two-way race

Poll source	Date administered	Democrat	%	Republican	%	Lead margin	Sample size	Margin of error
Insights West	November 4–6, 2016	Hillary Clinton	55%	Donald Trump	39%	16	402	± 4.9%
KCTS 9/YouGov	October 6–13, 2016	Hillary Clinton	53%	Donald Trump	39%	14	750	± 4.4%
Strategies 360	September 29 – October 3, 2016	Hillary Clinton	50%	Donald Trump	33%	17	500	± 4.4%

Four-way race

Poll source	Date administered	Democrat	%	Republican	%	Libertarian	%	Green	%	Lead margin	Sample size	Margin of error
SurveyUSA	October 31 – November 2, 2016	Hillary Clinton	50%	Donald Trump	38%	Gary Johnson	4%	Jill Stein	2%	12	681	± 3.8%
Elway Poll	October 20–22, 2016	Hillary Clinton	48%	Donald Trump	31%	Gary Johnson	1%	Jill Stein	1%	17	502	± 4.5%
Strategies 360	September 29 – October 3, 2016	Hillary Clinton	47%	Donald Trump	31%	Gary Johnson	10%	Jill Stein	4%	16	500	± 4.4%
Emerson College	September 25–26, 2016	Hillary Clinton	44%	Donald Trump	38%	Gary Johnson	7%	Jill Stein	5%	6	700	± 3.6%
Insights West	September 12–14, 2016	Hillary Clinton	44%	Donald Trump	32%	Gary Johnson	16%	Jill Stein	6%	12	505	± 4.4%

== West Virginia ==
5 electoral votes
(Republican in 2008) 56%–43%
(Republican in 2012) 62%–36%

Winner
(Republican in 2016) 69%–26%

Two-way race

Poll source	Date administered	Democrat	%	Republican	%	Lead margin	Sample size	Margin of error
Garin-Hart-Yang	September 13–17, 2016	Hillary Clinton	28%	Donald Trump	60%	32	500	± 5.0%

Three-way race

Poll source	Date administered	Democrat	%	Republican	%	Independent/ Third-party candidate	%	Lead margin	Sample size	Margin of error
Just Win Strategies	September 8–10, 2016	Hillary Clinton	30%	Donald Trump	57%	Gary Johnson	4%	27	600	± 4%

== Wisconsin ==
10 electoral votes
(Democratic in 2008) 56%–42%
(Democratic in 2012) 53%–46%

Winner
(Republican in 2016) 47%–46%

Poll source	Date administered	Democrat	%	Republican	%	Lead margin	Sample size	Margin of error
Public Policy Polling	October 31 – November 1, 2016	Hillary Clinton	48%	Donald Trump	41%	7	891	± 3.3%
Loras College	October 31 – November 1, 2016	Hillary Clinton	44%	Donald Trump	42%	2	500	± 4.4%
Public Policy Polling	October 18–19, 2016	Hillary Clinton	50%	Donald Trump	38%	12	804	± 3.9%
Marquette University	October 6–9, 2016	Hillary Clinton	46%	Donald Trump	42%	4	878	± 3.9%
Marquette University	September 15–18, 2016	Hillary Clinton	44%	Donald Trump	42%	2	677	± 4.8%

Three-way race

Poll source	Date administered	Democrat	%	Republican	%	Libertarian	%	Lead margin	Sample size	Margin of error
Remington Research Group/Axiom Strategies	November 1–2, 2016	Hillary Clinton	49%	Donald Trump	41%	Gary Johnson	3%	8	2,720	± 1.88%
Remington Research Group/Axiom Strategies	October 23–30, 2016	Hillary Clinton	46%	Donald Trump	42%	Gary Johnson	4%	4	1,172	± 2.86%
Remington Research Group/Axiom Strategies	October 20–22, 2016	Hillary Clinton	46%	Donald Trump	41%	Gary Johnson	5%	5	1,795	± 2.31%

Four-way race

Poll source	Date administered	Democrat	%	Republican	%	Libertarian	%	Green	%	Lead margin	Sample size	Margin of error
Loras College	October 31 – November 1, 2016	Hillary Clinton	44%	Donald Trump	38%	Gary Johnson	7%	Jill Stein	2%	6	500	± 4.4%
Marquette University	October 26–31, 2016	Hillary Clinton	46%	Donald Trump	40%	Gary Johnson	4%	Jill Stein	3%	6	1,190	± 3.5%
Emerson College	October 27–28, 2016	Hillary Clinton	48%	Donald Trump	42%	Gary Johnson	9%	Jill Stein	1%	5	400	± 4.9%
McLaughlin & Associates	October 18–20, 2016	Hillary Clinton	48%	Donald Trump	43%	Gary Johnson	4%	Jill Stein	1%	5	600	± 4.0%
Monmouth University	October 15–18, 2016	Hillary Clinton	47%	Donald Trump	40%	Gary Johnson	6%	Jill Stein	1%	7	403	± 4.9%
St Norbert College	October 13–16, 2016	Hillary Clinton	47%	Donald Trump	39%	Gary Johnson	1%	Jill Stein	3%	8	664	± 3.8%
Marquette University	October 6–9, 2016	Hillary Clinton	44%	Donald Trump	37%	Gary Johnson	9%	Jill Stein	3%	7	878	± 3.9%
Loras College	October 5–8, 2016	Hillary Clinton	43%	Donald Trump	35%	Gary Johnson	8%	Jill Stein	2%	8	500	± 4.4%
CBS News/YouGov	October 5–7, 2016	Hillary Clinton	43%	Donald Trump	39%	Gary Johnson	4%	Jill Stein	1%	4	993	± 4.3%
Emerson College	September 19–20, 2016	Hillary Clinton	45%	Donald Trump	38%	Gary Johnson	11%	Jill Stein	2%	7	700	± 3.6%
Marquette University	September 15–18, 2016	Hillary Clinton	41%	Donald Trump	38%	Gary Johnson	11%	Jill Stein	2%	3	677	± 4.8%

== Wyoming ==
3 electoral votes
(Republican in 2008) 65%–33%
(Republican in 2012) 69%–28%

Winner
(Republican in 2016) 67%–22%

Four-way race

Poll source	Date administered	Democrat	%	Republican	%	Libertarian	%	Green Party	%	Lead margin	Sample size	Margin of error
Wyoming Survey and Analysis Center	October 5–11, 2016	Hillary Clinton	20%	Donald Trump	58%	Gary Johnson	9%	Jill Stein	2%	38	722	± 3.6%
DFM Research	September 6–11, 2016	Hillary Clinton	19%	Donald Trump	54%	Gary Johnson	10%	Jill Stein	2%	35	402	± 4.9%

== See also ==
General election polling

- Nationwide opinion polling for the 2016 United States presidential election
- Nationwide opinion polling for the 2016 United States presidential election by demographic
- International opinion polling for the 2016 United States presidential election

Democratic primary polling

- Nationwide opinion polling for the 2016 Democratic Party presidential primaries
- Statewide opinion polling for the 2016 Democratic Party presidential primaries

Republican primary polling

- Nationwide opinion polling for the 2016 Republican Party presidential primaries
- Statewide opinion polling for the 2016 Republican Party presidential primaries

Older polling

- Pre-2016 statewide opinion polling for the 2016 United States presidential election
