= 1976 United States presidential election in Delaware =

- November 2, 1976

Nominee	Jimmy Carter	Gerald Ford
Party	Democratic	Republican
Home state	Georgia	Michigan
Running mate	Walter Mondale	Bob Dole
Electoral vote	3	0
Popular vote	122,596	109,831
Percentage	51.98%	46.57%

Carter
40–50%
50–60%
60–70%
70–80%
80–90%
Ford
50–60%
60–70%
70–80%
President before election
Gerald Ford
Republican
Elected President
Jimmy Carter
Democratic

The 1976 United States presidential election in Delaware took place on November 2, 1976, as part of the 1976 United States presidential election. State voters chose three representatives, or electors, to the Electoral College, who voted for president and vice president.

Delaware was won by Jimmy Carter (D–Georgia), with 51.98% of the popular vote. Carter defeated incumbent President Gerald Ford (R–Michigan), who finished with 46.57% of the popular vote. Eugene McCarthy (Independent–Minnesota) finished third in Delaware with 1.03% of the statewide popular vote.

This was the last time that a Marxist political party appeared on the presidential ballot in Delaware until the 2008 election when the Socialist Workers Party appeared on the ballot.

== Results ==
1976 United States presidential election in Delaware
Party	Candidate	Votes	%
Democratic	Jimmy Carter	122,596	51.98%
Republican	Gerald Ford (inc.)	109,831	46.57%
Independent	Eugene McCarthy	2,437	1.03%
American	Thomas J. Anderson	645	0.27%
U.S. Labor	Lyndon LaRouche	136	0.06%
Prohibition	Benjamin Bubar Jr.	103	0.04%
Socialist Labor	Jules Levin	86	0.04%
Total votes		235,834	100.00%

=== Results by county ===
County	Jimmy Carter Democratic		Gerald Ford Republican		Various candidates Other parties		Margin		Total votes cast
County	#	%	#	%	#	%	#	%	Total votes cast
Kent	16,523	56.15%	12,604	42.83%	301	1.02%	3,919	13.32%	29,428
New Castle	87,521	51.38%	80,074	47.01%	2,743	1.61%	7,447	4.37%	170,338
Sussex	18,552	51.44%	17,153	47.56%	363	1.00%	1,399	3.88%	36,068
Totals	122,596	51.98%	109,831	46.57%	3,407	1.45%	12,765	5.41%	235,834

==== Counties that flipped from Republican to Democratic ====
- Kent
- New Castle
- Sussex

== See also ==
- United States presidential elections in Delaware
