= 2008 United States presidential election in Delaware =

- November 4, 2008

Nominee	Barack Obama	John McCain
Party	Democratic	Republican
Home state	Illinois	Arizona
Running mate	Joe Biden	Sarah Palin
Electoral vote	3	0
Popular vote	255,459	152,374
Percentage	61.94%	36.92%

Obama
40–50%
50–60%
60–70%
70–80%
80–90%
90–100%
McCain
40–50%
50–60%
60–70%
Tie/No Data
President before election
George W. Bush
Republican
Elected President
Barack Obama
Democratic

The 2008 United States presidential election in Delaware took place on November 4, 2008, and was part of the 2008 United States presidential election. Voters chose three representatives, or electors to the Electoral College, who voted for president and vice president.

Delaware was won by Democratic nominee Barack Obama with a 25.0% margin of victory, the best-ever result for a Democratic presidential candidate in Delaware as of 2024. Obama's large margin of victory was aided by his running mate, Joe Biden, a longtime U.S. senator from the state and the first Delawarean to appear on a national presidential ticket. At the same time, Biden was also running for a seventh term in the Senate, being elected during the same time he was elected vice president. During the campaign, Delaware was considered a safe blue state, and in the end only one county of Delaware's three counties, Sussex County, went for McCain, by a margin of approximately 7,000 votes or 8.58%. Obama's winning margin of over 103,000 votes is the largest in history for a presidential candidate in Delaware, with no one else ever winning by six figures.

Delaware was one of three states, along with rapidly left-trending Vermont and Obama's home state of Illinois, in which Obama outperformed Franklin D. Roosevelt in all four of his runs and Lyndon B. Johnson in his 1964 landslide.

The Socialist Workers Party appeared on the ballot making it the first time that a Marxist political party appeared on the presidential ballot since the Socialist Labor Party had appeared on it in the 1976 election.

== Primaries ==
=== Democratic primary ===
The Democratic Primary was held on Super Tuesday, February 5, 2008, and had a total of 15 delegates at stake. The winner in each of Delaware's subdivisions was awarded those subdivisions' delegates, totaling 10. Another 5 delegates were awarded to the statewide winner, Barack Obama. The 15 delegates represented Delaware at the Democratic National Convention in Denver, Colorado. 8 other unpledged delegates, known as superdelegates, also attended the convention and cast their votes as well.

==== Results ====
2008 Delaware Democratic Presidential Primary Results
Party	Candidate	Votes	Percentage	Delegates
Democratic	Barack Obama	51,148	53.07%	9
Democratic	Hillary Clinton	40,760	42.29%	6
Democratic	Joe Biden	2,863	2.97%	0
Democratic	John Edwards	1,241	1.29%	0
Democratic	Dennis Kucinich	192	0.20%	0
Democratic	Christopher Dodd	170	0.18%	0
Democratic	Joe Biden	440	0.12%	0
Totals		96,374	100.00%	15
Voter turnout		%		—

==== Analysis ====
Barack Obama's win in the Delaware Democratic Primary can be traced to a number of factors. According to the exit polls, 64% of voters in the Delaware Democratic Primary were Caucasian and they favored Clinton by a margin of 56-40 compared to the 28% of African American voters who backed Obama by a margin of 86–9. Obama won all age groups except senior citizens ages 65 and over who strongly backed Clinton by a margin of 56–38. Obama also won middle class and more affluent voters making over $30,000 while Clinton won lower middle class and less affluent voters making less than $30,000. Obama also won higher-educated voters (college graduates 60–35; postgraduate studies 66–32) while high school graduates backed Clinton 51–44; both candidates evenly split voters who had some college and/or an associate degree 47-47. Registered Democrats favored Obama 54-42 while Independents also backed him by a margin of 50–44; he also won all ideological groups. Regarding religion, Obama won all major denominations except Roman Catholics who backed Clinton with a 60–35 margin – Obama won Protestants 51–47, other Christians 71–24, and atheists/agnostics 60–35.

Obama performed best in New Castle County, the most populous and urban part of the state which contains Wilmington as well as several African Americans, which he won by a 56.49-39.69 margin of victory. He also narrowly won neighboring Kent County to the south, which contains the state capital of Dover, with 51.76% of the vote. Clinton won Sussex County in Southern Delaware, the more rural and conservative part of the state, with 52.73% of the vote.

=== Republican primary ===
The Republican primary was held on February 5 (Super Tuesday). A total of 18 delegates were selected. The Delaware Republican Party rallied behind John McCain, and was the declared winner of the primary election after successfully taking all 3 Delaware counties. McCain was followed by Mitt Romney in second and then by Mike Huckabee in third.

==== Candidates ====
- Mike Huckabee
- John McCain
- Ron Paul
- Mitt Romney

Candidates Rudy Giuliani, Duncan Hunter, Fred Thompson, and Tom Tancredo had dropped out of the presidential race before the Delaware primary.

==== Results ====
100% of precincts reporting
Candidate	Votes	Percentage	Delegates
John McCain	22,628	45.04%	18
Mitt Romney	16,344	32.53%	0
Mike Huckabee	7,706	15.34%	0
Ron Paul	2,131	4.24%	0
Rudy Giuliani*	1,255	2.5%	0
Tom Tancredo*	175	0.35%	0
Total	50,237	100%	18

*Candidate withdrew before primary

== Campaign ==
=== Predictions ===
There were 16 news organizations who made state-by-state predictions of the election. Here are their last predictions before election day:

Source	Ranking
D.C. Political Report	Likely D
Cook Political Report	Solid D
The Takeaway	Solid D
Electoral-vote.com	Solid D
Washington Post	Solid D
Politico	Solid D
RealClearPolitics	Solid D
FiveThirtyEight	Solid D
CQ Politics	Solid D
The New York Times	Solid D
CNN	Safe D
NPR	Solid D
MSNBC	Solid D
Fox News	Likely D
Associated Press	Likely D
Rasmussen Reports	Safe D

=== Polling ===
Obama won every single pre-election poll taken in the state, and each one by a double-digit margin of victory. He won the last poll by a 30-point margin.

=== Fundraising ===
John McCain raised a total of $340,736. Barack Obama raised $1,010,740.

=== Advertising and visits ===
No advertising was spent by either campaign. Delaware native Joe Biden campaigned here 6 times.

== Results ==
2008 United States presidential election in Delaware
Party	Candidate	Running mate	Votes	Percentage	Electoral votes
Democratic	Barack Obama	Joe Biden	255,459	61.94%	3
Republican	John McCain	Sarah Palin	152,374	36.92%	0
Independent	Ralph Nader	Matt Gonzalez	2,401	0.58%	0
Libertarian	Bob Barr	Wayne Allyn Root	1,109	0.27%	0
Constitution	Chuck Baldwin	Darrell Castle	626	0.15%	0
Green	Cynthia McKinney	Rosa Clemente	385	0.09%	0
Socialist Workers	Róger Calero	Alyson Kennedy	58	0.01%	0
Totals			412,398	100.00%	3
Voter turnout					68.00%

=== By county ===
County	Barack Obama Democratic		John McCain Republican		Various candidates Other parties		Margin		Total votes cast
County	#	%	#	%	#	%	#	%	Total votes cast
Kent	36,392	54.38%	29,827	44.57%	706	1.06%	6,565	9.81%	66,925
New Castle	178,768	69.66%	74,608	29.07%	3,245	1.26%	104,160	40.59%	256,621
Sussex	40,299	45.24%	47,939	53.82%	832	0.93%	-7,640	-8.58%	89,070
Totals	255,459	61.91%	152,374	36.93%	4,783	1.16%	103,085	24.98%	412,616

Counties that flipped from Republican to Democratic

- Kent (largest city: Dover)

=== By congressional district ===
Due to the state's low population, only one congressional district is allocated. This district is called the at-large district, because it covers the entire state, and thus is equivalent to the statewide election results.

District	McCain	Obama	Representative
At-large	36.94%	61.95%	Mike Castle

== Electors ==
Technically the voters of Delaware cast their ballots for electors: representatives to the Electoral College. Delaware is allocated 3 electors because it has one congressional district and two senators. All candidates who appear on the ballot or qualify to receive write-in votes must submit a list of three electors, who pledge to vote for their candidate and their running mate. Whoever wins the majority of votes in the state is awarded all three electoral votes. Their chosen electors then vote for president and vice president. Although electors are pledged to their candidate and running mate, they are not obligated to vote for them. An elector who votes for someone other than their candidate is known as a faithless elector.

The electors of each state and the District of Columbia met on December 15, 2008, to cast their votes for president and vice president. The Electoral College itself never meets as one body. Instead the electors from each state and the District of Columbia met in their respective capitals.

The following were the members of the Electoral College from the state. All 3 were pledged to Barack Obama and Joe Biden:

1. James Johnson
2. Ted Kaufman
3. Harriet Smith Windsor

== See also ==
- United States presidential elections in Delaware
