= List of airports in the Philadelphia metropolitan area =

The following is a list of current and historic public, private, and military airports that operate in the Philadelphia metropolitan area of the United States, which includes Philadelphia, the nation's sixth-most populous city, its Pennsylvania suburbs, New Castle and Kent counties in Delaware, and South Jersey.

Airport type descriptions: (COM) commercial airport | (GA) general aviation | (MIL) U.S. military or Air National Guard base

Airport name	Airport location (city)	Airport type	IATA / ICAO / FAA ident(s)	Airport note
Atlantic City International Airport	Egg Harbor Township, NJ	(COM) / (GA) / (MIL)	ACY / KACY / ACY	USAF and FAA restricted runways/taxiways/ramps present.
Bader Field	Atlantic City, NJ	(GA)	NONE / NONE / NONE	Airport closed to all flight ops except emergencies.
Brandywine Airport	West Goshen Township, PA	(GA)	NONE / KOQN / OQN	
Camden Central Airport	Camden, NJ	(COM)	NONE / NONE / NONE	Operated 1929–1957. Philadelphia's main airport until 1940
Camden County Airport	Berlin, NJ	(GA)	NONE / NONE / 19N	
Chandelle Estates Airport	Dover, DE	(GA)	NONE / NONE / 0N4	
Chester County G. O. Carlson Airport	Coatesville, PA	(GA)	CTH / KMQS / MQS	
Cross Keys Airport	Cross Keys, NJ	(GA)	NONE / NONE / 17N	
Doylestown Airport	Doylestown, PA	(GA)	DYL / KDYL / DYL	
Dover Air Force Base	Dover, DE	(MIL) / (GA)	DOV / KDOV / DOV	(GA) requires prior permission. No AVGAS fuel. No FBO.
Delaware Airpark	Cheswold, DE	(GA)	NONE / NONE / 33N	Use caution Dover AFB runways frequently mistaken for 33N.
Heritage Field Airport	Pottstown, PA	(GA)	PTW / KPTW	
McGuire Air Force Base	Wrightstown, NJ	(MIL)	WRI / KWRI / WRI	Authorized military aircraft only. No civilian aircraft.
Monmouth Executive Airport	Belmar / Farmingdale, NJ	(GA)	BLM / KBLM / BLM	
NAS Joint Reserve Base Willow Grove	Horsham Township, PA	(MIL)	NONE / NONE / NONE	Base closed due to realignment.
Northeast Philadelphia Airport	Philadelphia, PA	(GA)	PNE / KPNE / PNE	
Ocean City Municipal Airport	Ocean City, NJ	(GA)	NONE / NONE / 26N	
Philadelphia International Airport	Philadelphia, PA	(COM) / (GA)	PHL / KPHL / PHL	
Robert J. Miller Air Park	Toms River, NJ	(GA)	MJX / KMJX / KMJX	
Spitfire Aerodrome	Pedricktown, NJ	(GA)	NONE / NONE / 7N7	
South Jersey Regional Airport	Mount Holly, NJ	(GA)	LLY / KVAY / VAY	
Trenton-Mercer Airport	Trenton, NJ	(COM) / (GA)	TTN / KTTN / TTN	
Wilmington Airport (aka New Castle Airport)	Wilmington, DE	(GA)	ILG / KILG / ILG	
Wings Field	Blue Bell, PA	(GA)	BBX / KLOM / LOM	
