= Aviation in Delaware =

- Aviation in the United States
- Delaware State Flag

Airports
- Commercial – primary: 0
- Commercial – non-primary: 1
- General aviation: 3
- Other public-use airports: 6
- Military and other airports: 1

First flight
- 21 October 1910

The history of aviation in Delaware begins with the first aeronautical event of the flight of Robie Seidelinger in an aircraft of his own design, the Delaplane, on 21 October 1910 at Wawaset Park, Wilmington.

== Events ==
- 1931 Clyde Edward Pangborn and Hugh Herndon make the first flight across the Pacific in a Delaware built Bellanca J2 as part of a round-the world record attempt.
- 1941 Delaware native George Welch became the first fighter pilot to respond to the bombing at Pearl Harbor.
- 1943 Women Airforce Service Pilots is formed by Jacqueline Cochran with the merger of the 319th Women's Flying Training Detachment and the Women's Auxiliary Ferrying Squadron, 2nd Ferrying Group.

== Aircraft manufacturers ==
Bellanca Aircraft, 1927–present, was based out of New Castle, Delaware during its most influential period from 1928 to 1954.

== Aerospace ==
Many aerospace companies are incorporated in Delaware because of favorable tax status.

- United Technologies Corporation, owner of Sikorsky Aircraft.

== Airports ==
- List of airports in Delaware
- Wilmington Airport is the primary commercial airport for the state.

== Commercial service ==
Wilmington Airport in northern Delaware is the state's only commercial airport and has seen prior service from airlines including Delta, and United and Skybus. In June 2013, Frontier Airlines began service from the airport to numerous destinations throughout the country. This ended a five-year stretch in which Delaware was the only state in the union without commercial service. Frontier Airlines ended service from the airport in April 2015.

== Organizations ==
- Delaware Aviation Hall of Fame
- Experimental Aircraft Association chapter 240 is based out of Wilmington Delaware.
- Delaware Aviation Support, Inc.

== Government and military ==
- All flight operations in Delaware are conducted within FAA oversight.
- The Delaware State Police operates 3 Bell 407, 1 Bell 412, and 1 Cessna 182 in police and medical evacuations.
- The Delaware Air National Guard operates out of New Castle Airport (ILG).

== Museums ==
- Air Mobility Command museum at Dover Air Force Base
- Delaware Aviation Museum at Delaware Coastal Airport

== Gallery ==
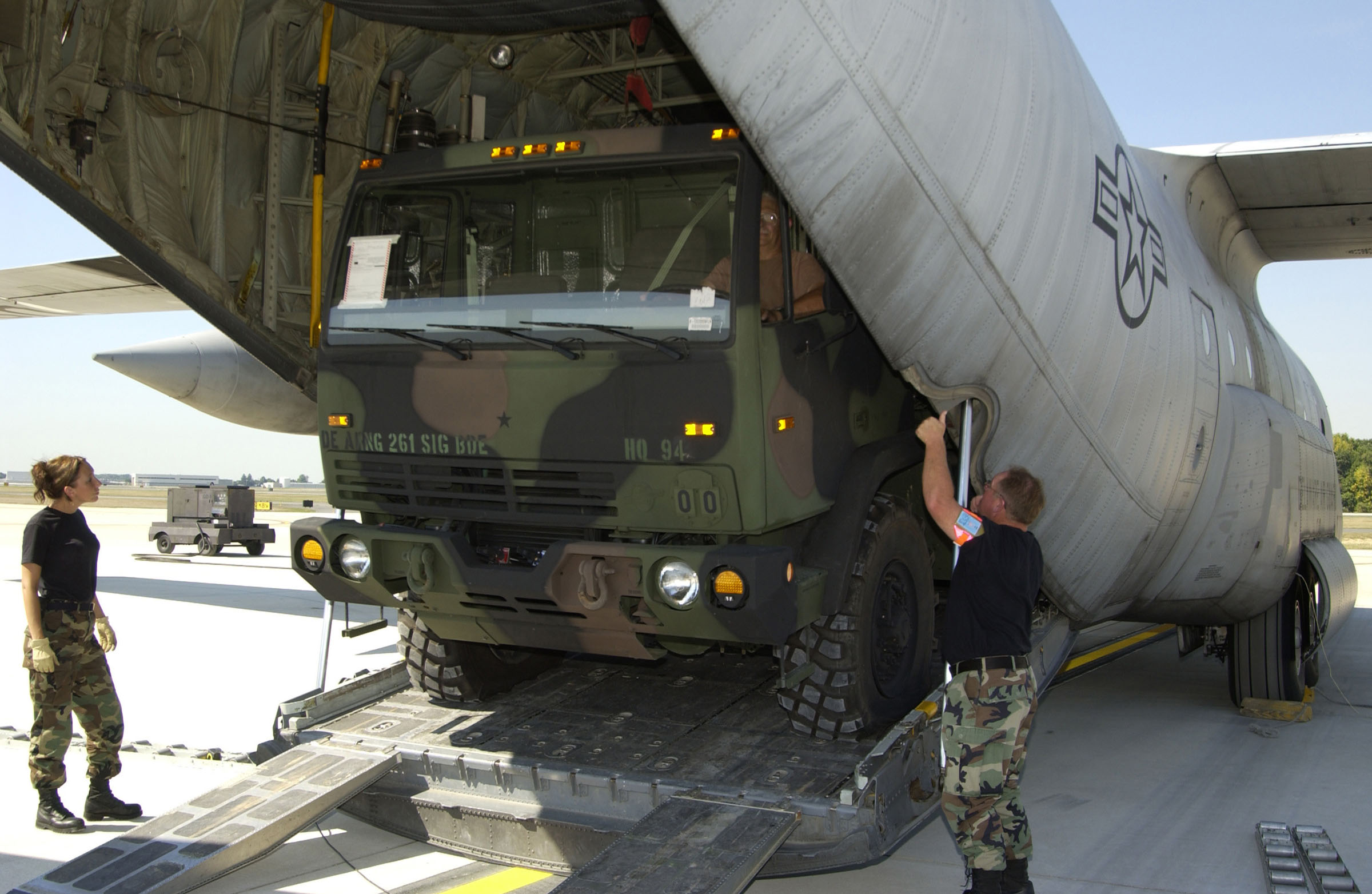
166th Airlift Wing C-130 Hercules support for Hurricane Katrina victims

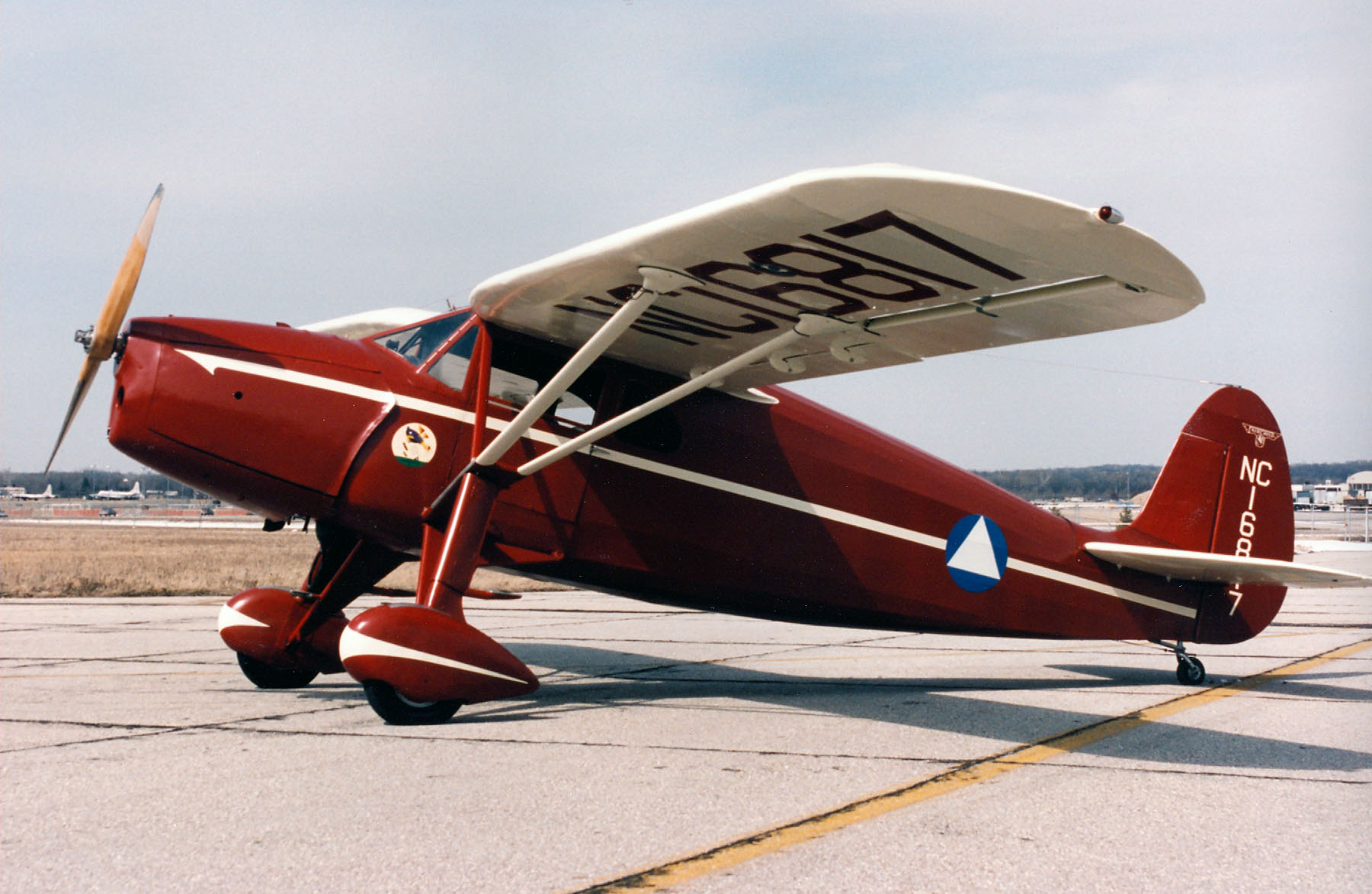
A CAP Fairchild 24 based at Rehoboth
