= Sussex Airport =

Sussex Airport may refer to:

- Sussex Aerodrome in Sussex, New Brunswick, Canada
- Sussex Airport (New Jersey) in Sussex, New Jersey, United States

Other airports located in places named Sussex:

- Delaware Coastal Airport, formerly known as Sussex County Airport, in Georgetown, Sussex County, Delaware, United States
- Laurel Airport (Delaware), formerly known as Western Sussex Airport, in Laurel, Sussex County, Delaware, United States
