= 1936 United States presidential election in Delaware =

- November 3, 1936

Nominee	Franklin D. Roosevelt	Alf Landon
Party	Democratic	Republican
Home state	New York	Kansas
Running mate	John Nance Garner	Frank Knox
Electoral vote	3	0
Popular vote	69,702	57,236
Percentage	54.62%	44.85%
County results
Roosevelt
50–60%
President before election
Franklin D. Roosevelt
Democratic
Elected President
Franklin D. Roosevelt
Democratic

The 1936 United States presidential election in Delaware was held on November 3, 1936. The state voters chose three electors to the Electoral College, who voted for president and vice president.

Delaware voted for Democratic Party candidate and incumbent President Franklin D. Roosevelt, who defeated Republican nominee, Kansas Governor Alf Landon. Roosevelt won the state by a margin of 9.77%, marking the first time since 1912 that the state voted for a Democratic presidential candidate, and the first time since 1888 that a Democrat carried the state with an outright majority.

While Landon lost the state, the 44.85% of the popular vote made Delaware his fifth strongest state in the 1936 election in terms of popular vote percentage after Vermont, Maine, New Hampshire and Kansas.

This election marked Delaware's transition into a bellwether state: for the rest of the 20th century, it would vote for a losing candidate only once (in 1948). Once the century rolled around, it came to be regarded as a solidly blue state.

== Results ==
General Election Results
Party	Pledged to	Elector	Votes
Democratic Party	Franklin D. Roosevelt	Henry T. Graham	69,702
Democratic Party	Franklin D. Roosevelt	Charles M. Wharton	69,172
Democratic Party	Franklin D. Roosevelt	Wilson M. Vinyard	69,128
Republican Party	Alf Landon	Julia H. Tallman	54,014
Republican Party	Alf Landon	George E. Walls	53,836
Republican Party	Alf Landon	William P. Richardson	53,834
Independent Republican Party	Alf Landon	John Wirt Willis	3,222
Independent Republican Party	Alf Landon	Joseph Morris Harrington	3,204
Independent Republican Party	Alf Landon	Frank S. Carter	3,190
Union Party	William Lemke	Mary A. de Fanti	442
Union Party	William Lemke	Mary A. Miller	432
Union Party	William Lemke	Thomas Ryan	429
Socialist Party	Norman Thomas	Walter B. Pollard	172
Socialist Party	Norman Thomas	Ernest Mills	170
Socialist Party	Norman Thomas	Edmund Smith	169
Communist Party	Earl Browder	John D. Haman	51
Communist Party	Earl Browder	Athanasais T. Hadges	48
Communist Party	Earl Browder	Sadie Tomkin	45
Votes cast (Note: Based on highest elector on each ticket)			127,603

=== Results by county ===
County	Franklin D. Roosevelt Democratic		Alf Landon Republican (Note: Fusion of Republican and Independent Republican vote)		William Lemke Union		Norman Thomas Socialist		Earl Browder Communist		Margin		Total votes cast
County	#	%	#	%	#	%	#	%	#	%	#	%	Total votes cast
Kent	9,588	56.38%	7,389	43.45%	0	0.00%	22	0.13%	6	0.04%	2,199	12.93%	17,005
New Castle	47,315	55.17%	37,851	44.13%	442	0.52%	117	0.14%	41	0.05%	9,464	11.03%	85,766
Sussex	12,799	51.54%	11,996	48.31%	0	0.00%	33	0.13%	4	0.02%	803	3.23%	24,832
Totals	69,702	54.62%	57,236	44.85%	442	0.35%	172	0.13%	51	0.04%	12,466	9.77%	127,603

==== Counties that flipped from Republican to Democratic ====
- New Castle

== See also ==
- United States presidential elections in Delaware
