= Smyrna Airport =

Smyrna Airport may refer to:

- Smyrna Airport (Tennessee) in Smyrna, Tennessee, United States (FAA: MQY)
- Smyrna Airport (Delaware) in Smyrna, Delaware, United States (FAA: 38N)
