= 1924 United States presidential election in Delaware =

- November 4, 1924

| Nominee | Calvin Coolidge | John W. Davis | Robert M. La Follette |
| Party | Republican | Democratic | Progressive |
| Home state | Massachusetts | West Virginia | Wisconsin |
| Running mate | Charles G. Dawes | Charles W. Bryan | Burton K. Wheeler |
| Electoral vote | 3 | 0 | 0 |
| Popular vote | 52,441 | 33,445 | 4,979 |
| Percentage | 57.70% | 36.80% | 5.48% |
County results
Coolidge
50–60%
60–70%
Davis
40–50%
President before election
Calvin Coolidge
Republican
Elected President
Calvin Coolidge
Republican

The 1924 United States presidential election in Delaware took place on November 4, 1924. All contemporary 48 states were part of the 1924 United States presidential election. State voters chose three electors to the Electoral College, which selected the president and vice president.

Delaware was won by the Republican nominee, incumbent President Calvin Coolidge of Massachusetts, over the Democratic nominee, Ambassador John W. Davis of West Virginia. Coolidge ran with former Budget Director Charles G. Dawes of Illinois, while Davis ran with Governor Charles W. Bryan of Nebraska. Also in the running that year was the Progressive Party nominee, Senator Robert M. La Follette of Wisconsin and his running mate Senator Burton K. Wheeler of Montana.

This was the last time a Republican won the presidency without carrying Kent County until 2024. This was also the last time until 2000 that an unsuccessful Democratic candidate was able to carry any of Delaware's counties.

== Results ==
General Election Results
| Party | Pledged to | Elector | Votes |
|---|---|---|---|
| Republican Party | Calvin Coolidge | Henry A. du Pont | 52,441 |
| Republican Party | Calvin Coolidge | Thomas D. Garrison | 51,994 |
| Republican Party | Calvin Coolidge | Harry W. Viven | 51,948 |
| Democratic Party | John W. Davis | Charles F. Curley | 33,445 |
| Democratic Party | John W. Davis | William J. P. White | 33,326 |
| Democratic Party | John W. Davis | John C. Hopkins | 33,316 |
| Progressive Party | Robert M. La Follette | Christian A. Burkhard | 4,979 |
| Progressive Party | Robert M. La Follette | Elizabeth B. Stirlith | 4,804 |
| Progressive Party | Robert M. La Follette | Peter H. Bell | 4,800 |
| Commonwealth Land Party | William J. Wallace | Gertrude G. Worthington | 20 |
| Commonwealth Land Party | William J. Wallace | Edwin Stanton Ross | 16 |
| Commonwealth Land Party | William J. Wallace | Henry W. Hetzel | 15 |
| Votes cast (Note: Based on highest elector on each ticket) | | | 90,885 |

=== Results by county ===
| County | Calvin Coolidge Republican | | John W. Davis Democratic | | Robert M. La Follette Progressive | | William J. Wallace Commonwealth Land | | Margin | | Total votes cast |
| County | # | % | # | % | # | % | # | % | # | % | Total votes cast |
|---|---|---|---|---|---|---|---|---|---|---|---|
| Kent | 6,894 | 49.17% | 6,935 | 49.46% | 192 | 1.37% | 0 | 0.00% | -41 | -0.29% | 14,021 |
| New Castle | 35,427 | 61.24% | 17,842 | 30.84% | 4,562 | 7.89% | 20 | 0.03% | 17,585 | 30.40% | 57,851 |
| Sussex | 10,120 | 53.23% | 8,668 | 45.59% | 225 | 1.18% | 0 | 0.00% | 1,452 | 7.64% | 19,013 |
| Totals | 52,441 | 57.70% | 33,445 | 36.80% | 4,979 | 5.48% | 20 | 0.02% | 18,996 | 20.90% | 90,885 |

== See also ==
- United States presidential elections in Delaware
