= 2000 United States presidential election in Delaware =

- November 7, 2000

Nominee	Al Gore	George W. Bush
Party	Democratic	Republican
Home state	Tennessee	Texas
Running mate	Joe Lieberman	Dick Cheney
Electoral vote	3	0
Popular vote	180,068	137,288
Percentage	54.96%	41.90%

Gore
40–50%
50–60%
60–70%
70–80%
80–90%
90–100%
Bush
40–50%
50–60%
President before election
Bill Clinton
Democratic
Elected President
George W. Bush
Republican

The 2000 United States presidential election in Delaware took place on November 7, 2000, part of the 2000 United States presidential election in all 50 states and D.C. Voters chose three representatives, or electors to the Electoral College, who voted for president and vice president.

Delaware was won by Vice President Al Gore with a 13.1% margin of victory. Gore carried Delaware's most populous county, New Castle County, with almost 60% of the vote. Bush won the other two counties, but by relatively narrow margins. This was the first election since 1948, and only the fourth since 1892, in which Delaware backed the losing nominee, indicating its transformation from historical bellwether state to reliable blue state. Bush became the first Republican since Benjamin Harrison in 1888 to win a presidential election without New Castle County or Delaware at-large. Gore also became the first losing Democrat since John W. Davis in 1924 to win any of Delaware's counties.

Delaware was one of ten states that backed George H. W. Bush for president in 1988 that did not back George W. Bush in either 2000 or 2004.

== General election ==
=== Polling ===
Poll source	Date(s)	Sample size	Margin of error	George W. Bush (R)	Al Gore (D)	Ralph Nader (G)	Other / undecided (Note: Calculated by taking the difference of 100% and all other listed candidates combined. For polls that do not report a figure for Nader, this includes his support.)
Mason-Dixon Polling & Strategy	November 1, 2000	625	—	46%	42%	4%	8%
Rasmussen Reports	October 30, 2000	776	—	43%	44%	—	13%
SurveyUSA	October 24, 2000	500	—	45%	49%	—	6%

=== Results ===
2000 United States presidential election in Delaware
Party	Candidate	Running mate	Votes	Percentage	Electoral votes
Democratic	Albert Arnold Gore Jr.	Joseph Isadore Lieberman	180,068	54.96%	3
Republican	George Walker Bush	Richard Bruce Cheney	137,288	41.91%	0
Green	Ralph Nader	Winona LaDuke	8,307	2.54%	0
Reform	Pat Buchanan	Ezola Foster	777	0.24%	0
Libertarian	Harry Browne	Wayne Allyn Root	774	0.24%	0
Constitution	Howard Phillips	Michael Peroutka	289	0.09%	0
Natural Law	John Hagelin	Mary Alice Herbert	107	0.03%	0
	write-ins		93	0.03%	0
Totals			327,703	100.00%	3
Voter turnout (voting age)					56%

==== By county ====
County	Al Gore Democratic		George W. Bush Republican		Ralph Nader Green		Various candidates Other parties		Margin		Total votes cast
County	#	%	#	%	#	%	#	%	#	%	Total votes cast
Kent	22,790	47.23%	24,081	49.90%	1,082	2.24%	301	0.62%	-1,291	-2.67%	48,254
New Castle	127,539	59.86%	78,587	36.88%	5,767	2.71%	1,167	0.55%	48,952	22.98%	213,060
Sussex	29,739	44.86%	34,620	52.23%	1,458	2.20%	470	0.71%	-4,881	-7.37%	66,287
Totals	180,068	54.96%	137,288	41.90%	8,307	2.54%	1,959	0.60%	42,780	13.06%	327,622

Counties that flipped from Democratic to Republican

- Kent (largest city: Dover)
- Sussex (largest city: Seaford)

==== By congressional district ====
Due to the state's low population, only 1 congressional district, Delaware's at-large congressional district is allocated.

District	Bush	Gore	Representative
At-large	41.9%	55.0%	Mike Castle

== Electors ==
Technically the voters of Delaware cast their ballots for electors: representatives to the Electoral College. Delaware is allocated three electors because it has one congressional district and two senators. All candidates who appear on the ballot or qualify to receive write-in votes must submit a list of three electors, who pledge to vote for their candidate and their running mate. Whoever wins the majority of votes in the state is awarded all three electoral votes. Their chosen electors then vote for president and vice president. Although electors are pledged to their candidate and running mate, they are not obligated to vote for them. An elector who votes for someone other than their candidate is known as a faithless elector.

The electors of each state and the District of Columbia met on December 18, 2000 to cast their votes for president and vice president. The Electoral College itself never meets as one body. Instead the electors from each state and the District of Columbia met in their respective capitols.

The following were the members of the Electoral College from the state. All were pledged to and voted for Gore and Lieberman:

- Michael Begatto
- Margaret Rose Henry
- Ruth Ann Messick

== See also ==
- United States presidential elections in Delaware
