= Jenkins Airport =

- IATA: none; ICAO: none; FAA LID: 15N

Summary
- Airport type: Public use
- Owner: Joe C. Jenkins
- Serves: Wyoming, Delaware
- Time zone: UTC−05:00 (-5)
  - Summer (DST): UTC−04:00 (-4)
- Elevation AMSL: 53 ft (16 m)
- Coordinates: 39°07′02″N 075°35′04″W

Map
- Interactive map of Jenkins Airport

Runways
Direction	Length		Surface
Direction	ft	m	Surface
12/30	2,035	620	Turf

Statistics (2022)
- Aircraft operations: 60
- Based aircraft: 20
- Source: Federal Aviation Administration

Jenkins Airport (FAA LID: 15N) is a public use airport located one nautical mile (2 km) west of the central business district of Wyoming, a town in Kent County, Delaware, United States. It is privately owned by Joe C. Jenkins.

== Facilities and aircraft ==
Jenkins Airport covers an area of 60 acres (24 ha) at an elevation of 53 feet (16 m) above mean sea level. It has one runway, which has a turf surface: runway 12/30 is 2,035 by 70 feet (620 x 21 m).

For the 12-month period ending December 31, 2022, the airport had 60 aircraft operations, all general aviation, an average of 5 per month. This is down from 1,400 operations in 2011. At that time, there were 20 aircraft based at this airport: 18 single-engine airplanes, 1 multi-engine airplane, and 1 glider.

The airport does not have a fixed-base operator, and no fuel is available.

== See also ==
- List of airports in Delaware
