= Chorman Airport =

Airport in Delaware, United States

- IATA: none; ICAO: none; FAA LID: D74

Summary
- Airport type: Public use
- Owner: Allen Chorman
- Serves: Farmington, Delaware
- Time zone: UTC−05:00 (-5)
  - Summer (DST): UTC−04:00 (-4)
- Elevation AMSL: 66 ft (20 m)
- Coordinates: 38°50′58″N 075°36′46″W

Map
- Interactive map of Chorman Airport

Runways
| Direction | Length | | Surface |
| Direction | ft | m | Surface |
|---|---|---|---|
| 16/34 | 3,588 | 1,094 | Asphalt |

Statistics (2022)
- Aircraft operations: 9,950
- Based aircraft: 44
- Source: Federal Aviation Administration

Chorman Airport (FAA LID: D74) is a public use airport located two nautical miles (4 km) southwest of the central business district of Farmington, a town in Kent County, Delaware, United States. It is privately owned by Allen Chorman.

== Facilities and aircraft ==
Chorman Airport covers an area of 134 acres (54 ha) at an elevation of 66 feet (20 m) above mean sea level. It has one runway designated 16/34 with an asphalt surface measuring 3,588 x 37 ft (1,094 x 11 m).

For the 12-month period ending December 31, 2022, the airport had 9,950 aircraft operations, an average of 27 per day. It was all general aviation. This was down from 14,600 annual operations in 2011. In December 2022, there were 44 aircraft based at this airport: 38 single engine, 4 multi engine airplanes, and 2 helicopters.

The airport does not have a fixed-base operator, and no fuel is available.

== Accidents and incidents ==
- On November 4, 2006, an amateur-built Blondin 601HDS was destroyed when it collided with terrain after takeoff from Chorman Airport. Witnesses stated that the engine sound during the takeoff roll and initial climb was "normal," "strong," and continuous with no interruption. The takeoff roll was "much longer than usual" and the airplane used about two thirds of the runway. The aircraft had a shallow climb and drifted right of runway centerline; it then banked to the left in an apparent attempt to return to the airport. It soon disappeared below the trees, but just after reappearing, it entered a steep bank and disappeared again, at which time it crashed. The reason for the crash could not be determined.
- On June 18, 2014, a Grumman Ag Cat impacted the ground during a forced landing shortly after takeoff from Chorman Airport. The pilot had flown the aircraft earlier in the day. After departure on the accident flight, the pilot maneuvered the airplane in order to climb out to the right of the runway's extended centerline to avoid overflying a residence. Approximately 150 feet above ground level, he commanded a slight left bank towards the west, and the airplane immediately began to "settle." The pilot leveled the wings; however, the airplane started an uncommanded right bank "similar to entering a stall." The pilot attempted to pull the dump handle but was unable to do so due to the aircraft's close proximity to the ground. The airplane subsequently impacted a field, nosed over, and came to rest inverted. The probable cause of the accident was found to be the pilot's inadequate preflight planning for a takeoff in high density altitude conditions and his decision to reduce power during the initial climb, which led to the airplane exceeding its critical angle of attack and experiencing an aerodynamic stall.
- On November 27, 2015, a Mooney M20J and a Boeing PT17 collided in the traffic pattern at Chorman Airport. The two aircraft arrived at the airport around the same time and entered the traffic patterns for opposing sides of the same runway: the Mooney joined left downwind for runway 34, and the Boeing entered the downwind to runway 16. As the Mooney touched down on Runway 34, he saw the Boeing on the opposite end of the runway; while the Mooney pilot stopped 300 feet ahead of the Boeing, he said the Boeing kept taxiing toward him. The Mooney pilot attempted to take evasive action, but, in doing so, impacted the Boeing, which was in a nose-high attitude due to its tailwheel configuration and therefore did not see the Mooney until just before the collision. The probable cause of the accident was found to be both pilots' failure to maintain visual separation during landing at a non-towered airport.

== See also ==
- List of airports in Delaware
