= Summit Airport (Delaware) =

- IATA: none; ICAO: KEVY; FAA LID: EVY

Summary
- Airport type: Public
- Owner: Summit Aviation, Inc.
- Location: Middletown, Delaware, United States
- Time zone: UTC−05:00 (-5)
  - Summer (DST): UTC−04:00 (-4)
- Elevation AMSL: 70 ft / 21 m
- Coordinates: 39°31′13″N 075°43′14″W
- Website: Summit Aviation

Map
- Interactive map of Summit Airport

Runways
Direction	Length		Surface
Direction	ft	m	Surface
17/35	4,487	1,368	Asphalt
11/29	3,600	1,097	Turf

Statistics (2016)
- Aircraft operations: 31,390
- Based aircraft: 21
- Source: Federal Aviation Administration

Summit Airport (ICAO: KEVY, FAA LID: EVY) is a public-use airport located 5 miles (8.0 km) north of the central business district of Middletown, in New Castle County, Delaware, United States. It is privately owned by Summit Aviation, Inc. It is included in the Federal Aviation Administration (FAA) National Plan of Integrated Airport Systems for 2017–2021, in which it is categorized as a reliever general aviation facility.

Many U.S. airports use the same three-letter location identifier for the FAA and IATA. However, this airport is assigned EVY by the FAA but has no designation from the IATA.

The airport hosts a variety of aviation-related events throughout the year. It hosts a multi-week Women in Aviation and Law Enforcement Seminar sponsored by the Delaware State Police.

The airport has hosted training missions for medivac helicopter crews. It is also a maintenance base for military Chinook helicopters.

The airport has been a source of controversy for storing an ATR 42 purchased to serve in drug enforcement efforts in Afghanistan. The plane is unairworthy and unable to fly, and it thus is taking up space and rent.

== Facilities and aircraft ==
Summit Airport covers an area of 209 acres (85 ha) which contains two runways. Runway 17/35 measures 4,488 x 65 ft (1,368 x 20 m) with an asphalt surface. Runway 11/29 measures 3,601 x 200 ft (1,098 x 61 m) with a turf surface.

For the 12-month period ending December 31, 2016, the airport had 31,390 aircraft operations, an average of 86 per day: 99% general aviation and less than 1% military. This is down from 89,600 aircraft operations in 2002. In 2016, there were 21 aircraft based at the airport, all single engine airplanes. This was down from 103 based aircraft in 2002.

== Accidents and incidents ==
- On November 9, 2008, a Rotorway Executive 162F experimental helicopter was damaged during an engine runup at the Summit Airport. The helicopter's chain drive oil system had just been repaired. The probable cause of the accident was found to be the student pilot’s excessive use of cyclic during the engine run-up. Contributing to the accident were the pilot’s inexperience and gusting wind conditions.
- On December 1, 2008, a Piper PA-32 experienced a "sudden loss of airspeed and rapid increase in descent rate that was not altered by the application of power." The aircraft made it to the airport, but it landed hard and all three landing gear collapsed. The aircraft slid off the runway, and the wing spar and engine firewall were damaged. After the accident, the pilot said he had been flying from the right seat, making it difficult to read the instruments; the pilot also said he had encountered windshear on final. The probable cause of the accident was found to be the pilot's failure to maintain aircraft control while landing in gusty conditions.
- A small plane crashed near the airport in April 2010.
- On August 18, 2013, a Cessna 172S Skyhawk crashed while on a student pilot solo flight. On the last landing, the plane touched down hard and bounced. The pilot tried to release back pressure to compensate, and the aircraft bounced again. After the power was pulled to idle, the plane hit the ground a third time and came to a stop. The probable cause of the accident was found to be the student pilot’s improper recovery from a bounced landing.

== See also ==
- List of airports in Delaware
