= 1912 United States presidential election in Delaware =

- November 5, 1912

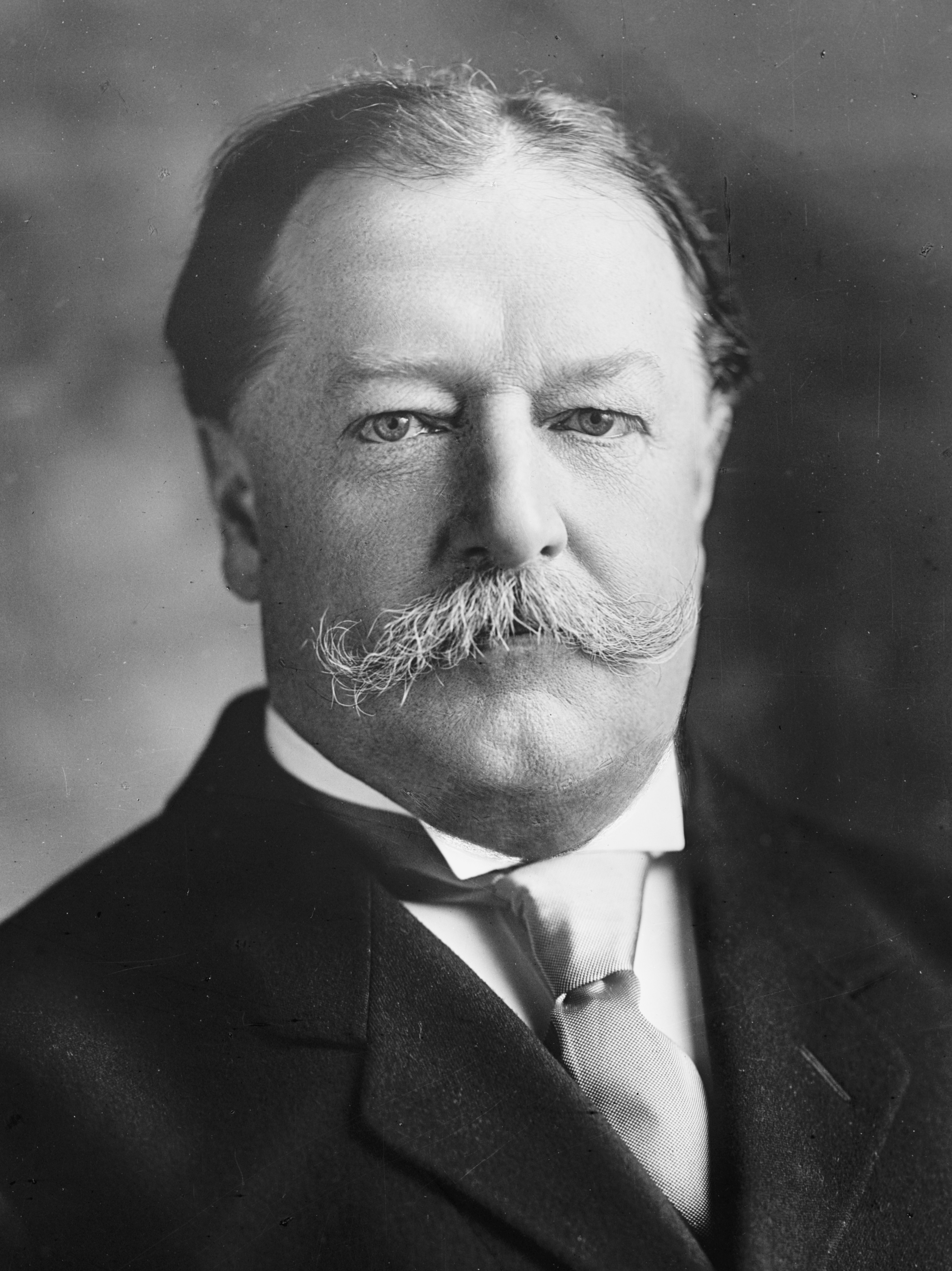

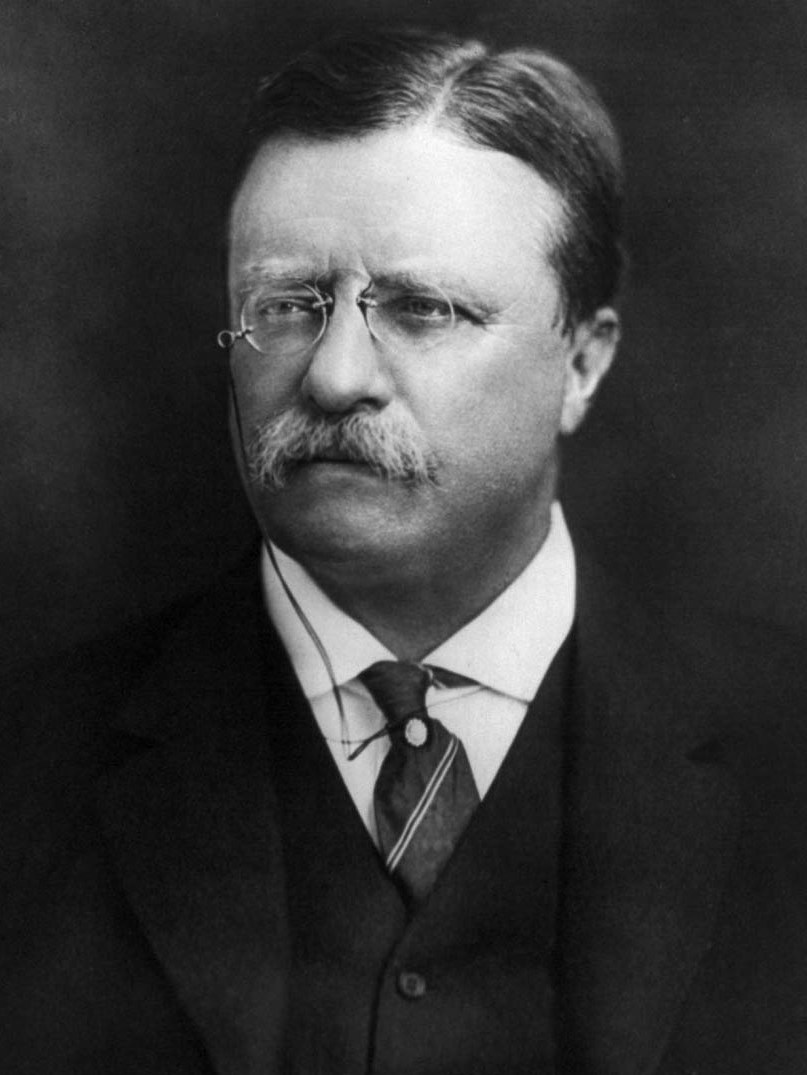
Nominee	Woodrow Wilson	William Howard Taft	Theodore Roosevelt
Party	Democratic	Republican	Progressive
Home state	New Jersey	Ohio	New York
Running mate	Thomas R. Marshall	Nicholas M. Butler	Hiram Johnson
Electoral vote	3	0	0
Popular vote	22,631	15,997	8,886
Percentage	46.48%	32.85%	18.25%
County results
Wilson
40–50%
50–60%
President before election
William Howard Taft
Republican
Elected President
Woodrow Wilson
Democratic

The 1912 United States presidential election in Delaware took place on November 5, 1912, as part of the 1912 United States presidential election. State voters chose three representatives, or electors, to the Electoral College, who voted for president and vice president.

Delaware was won by Princeton University President and governor of New Jersey Woodrow Wilson (D–Virginia), running with governor of Indiana Thomas R. Marshall, with 46.48% of the popular vote, against the 27th president of the United States William Howard Taft (R–Ohio), running with Columbia University President Nicholas Murray Butler, with 32.85% of the popular vote and the 26th president of the United States Theodore Roosevelt (P–New York), running with governor of California Hiram Johnson, with 18.25% of the popular vote.

Delaware was the only state where the Prohibition Party received fourth place with 1.28% of the popular vote which was ahead of the Socialist Eugene V. Debs who only received 1.14% of the vote. Woodrow Wilson became the first Democratic presidential candidate to carry Delaware since Grover Cleveland in 1892, and the last until Franklin D. Roosevelt in 1936.

== Results ==
General Election Results
Party	Pledged to	Elector	Votes
Democratic Party	Woodrow Wilson	Spottswood Garland	22,631
Democratic Party	Woodrow Wilson	Irving Culver	22,626
Democratic Party	Woodrow Wilson	James H. Hughes	22,624
Republican Party	William Howard Taft	John Bancroft	15,997
Republican Party	William Howard Taft	Daniel M. Wilson	15,996
Republican Party	William Howard Taft	Harry V. Lyons	15,995
Progressive Party	Theodore Roosevelt	Francis I. du Pont	8,886
Progressive Party	Theodore Roosevelt	Samuel H. Derby	8,884
Progressive Party	Theodore Roosevelt	George W. Stradley	8,881
Prohibition Party	Eugene W. Chafin	Hiram B. Hitch	623
Prohibition Party	Eugene W. Chafin	James D. West	621
Prohibition Party	Eugene W. Chafin	Daniel Green	620
Socialist Party	Eugene V. Debs	Hiram Handloser	556
Socialist Party	Eugene V. Debs	Paul Scheuler	556
Socialist Party	Eugene V. Debs	Morde Smith	556
Votes cast (Note: Based on highest elector on each ticket)			48,693

=== Results by county ===
County	Woodrow Wilson Democratic		William Howard Taft Republican		Theodore Roosevelt Progressive		Eugene W. Chafin Prohibition		Eugene V. Debs Socialist		Margin		Total votes cast
County	#	%	#	%	#	%	#	%	#	%	#	%	Total votes cast
Kent	4,071	51.30%	3,192	40.22%	567	7.14%	97	1.22%	9	0.11%	879	11.08%	7,936
New Castle	13,009	44.27%	8,340	28.38%	7,090	24.13%	398	1.35%	547	1.86%	4,669	15.89%	29,384
Sussex	5,551	48.81%	4,465	39.26%	1,229	10.81%	128	1.13%	0	0.00%	1,086	9.55%	11,373
Totals	22,631	46.48%	15,997	32.85%	8,886	18.25%	623	1.28%	556	1.14%	6,634	13.62	48,693

==== Counties that flipped from Republican to Democratic ====
- Kent
- New Castle
- Sussex

== See also ==
- United States presidential elections in Delaware
