= Henderson Aviation Airport =

- IATA: none; ICAO: none; FAA LID: 0N6

Summary
- Airport type: Public
- Owner: Emad Albanna
- Serves: Felton, Delaware
- Time zone: UTC−05:00 (-5)
  - Summer (DST): UTC−04:00 (-4)
- Elevation AMSL: 50 ft (15 m)
- Coordinates: 39°00′46″N 075°32′02″W

Map
- Interactive map of Henderson Aviation Airport

Runways
Direction	Length		Surface
Direction	ft	m	Surface
15/33	2,048	624	Turf

Statistics (2017)
- Aircraft operations: 10
- Source: Federal Aviation Administration

Henderson Aviation Airport (FAA LID: 0N6) (also known as Albanna Aviation Airport) is an airport located two nautical miles (4 km) northeast of the central business district of Felton, a town in Kent County, Delaware, United States. It is privately owned by Emad Albanna.

As of May 2023, a NOTAM marks the airport as closed except to aircraft with prior permission to land there.

== Facilities and aircraft ==
Henderson Aviation Airport, founded by and originally named for David O. Henderson, covers an area of 86 acres (35 ha) at an elevation of 50 feet (15 m) above mean sea level. It has one runway designated as runway 15/33 with a turf surface and measuring 2,048 by 40 feet (624 x 12 m). Based on the 12 month period ending August 29, 2017, the airport averages 10 aircraft operations per year, all general aviation. This is down from 1,800 operations per year in 2002.

The airport does not have a fixed-base operator and has no fuel.

== Accidents and incidents ==
- On August 1, 2005, a Grumman Ag Cat was returning to Albanna Aviation Airport when it experienced a total loss of engine power. The aircraft landed hard on a soybean field, bounced, and came to rest inverted. The commercial pilot aboard was not injured. The probable cause of the accident was found to be the aircraft's mechanic's failure to comply with an airworthiness directive at the aircraft's last annual inspection, resulting in a total failure of the second stage turbine rotor.

== See also ==
- List of airports in Delaware
