= 1888 United States presidential election in Delaware =

- November 6, 1888
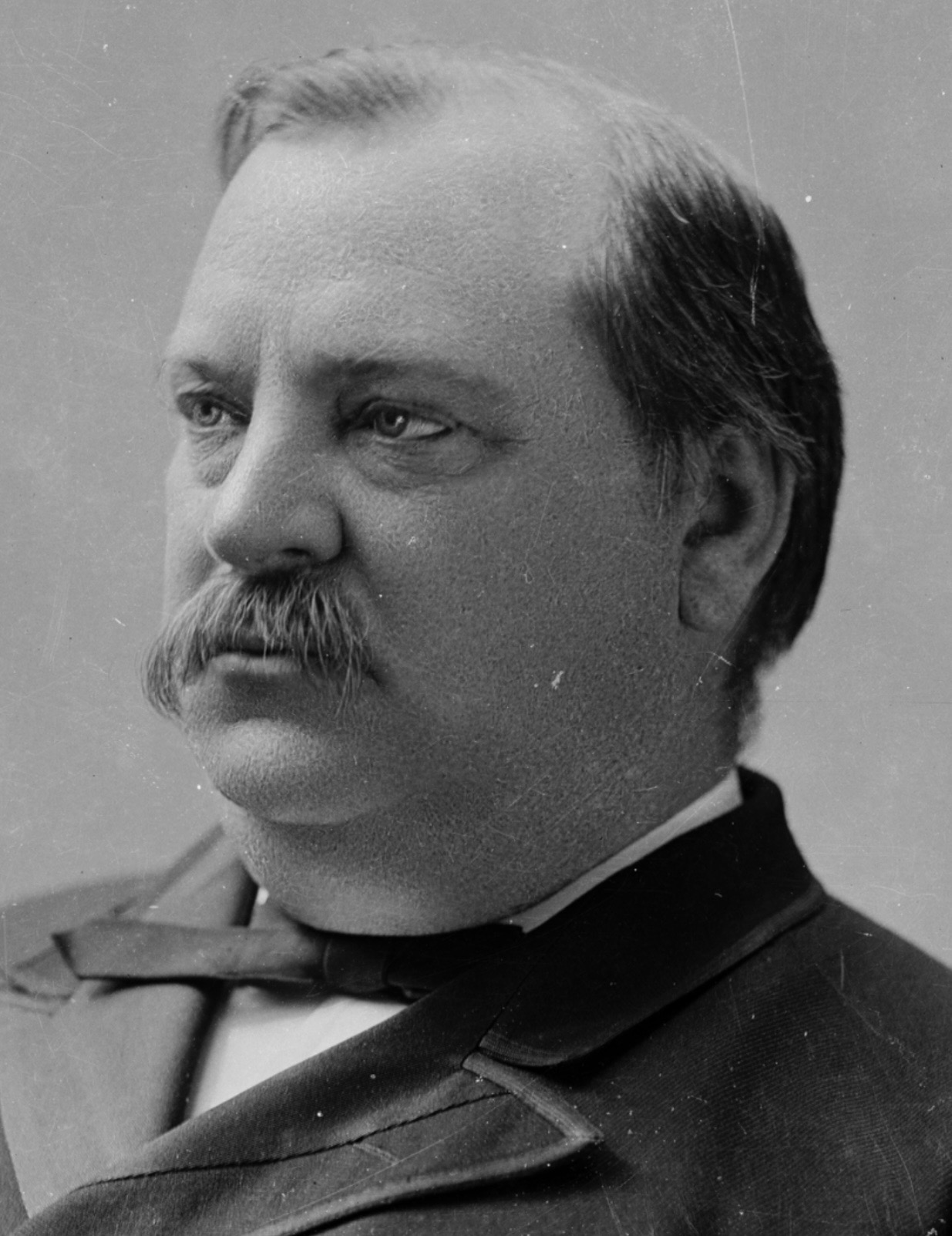

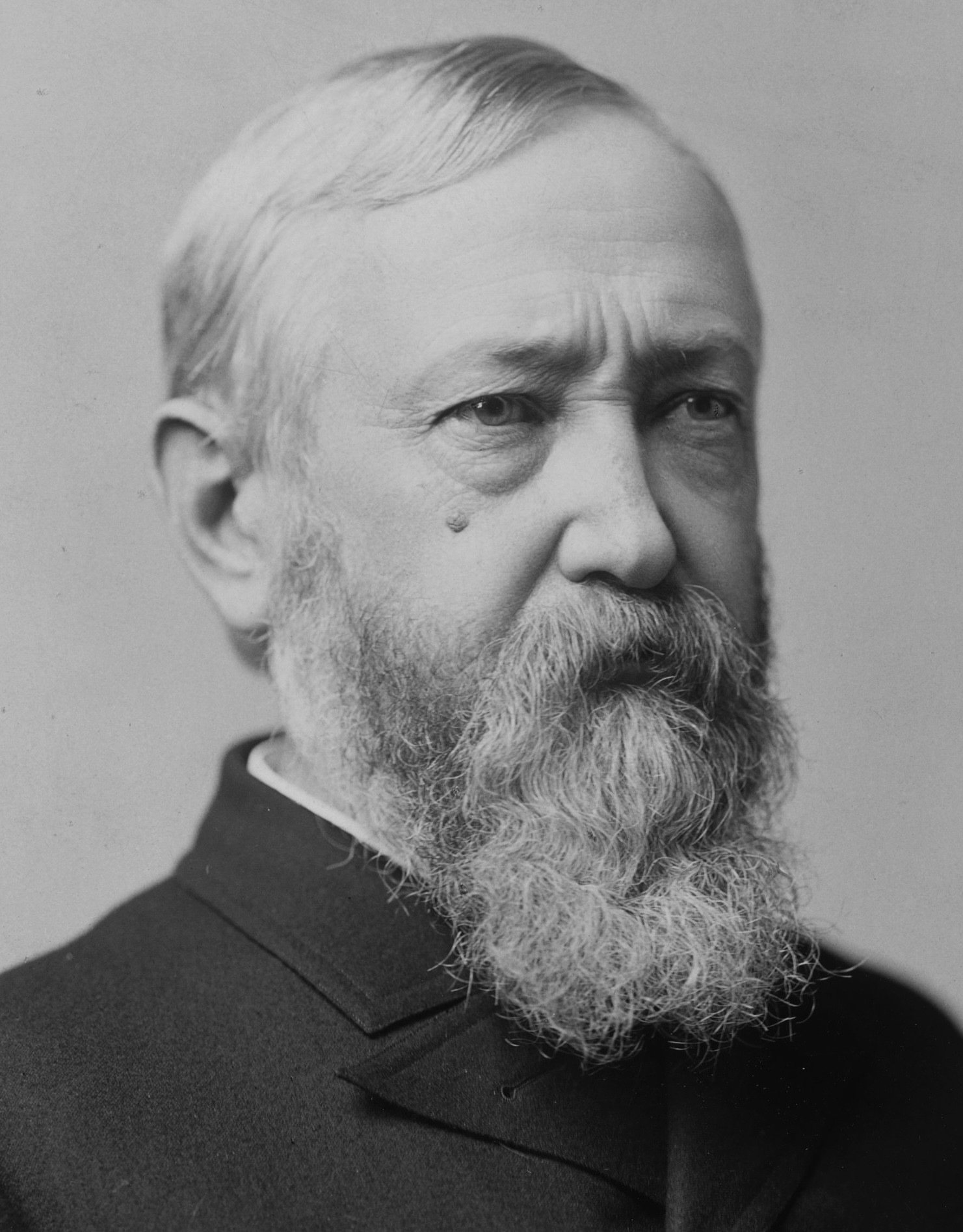
Nominee	Grover Cleveland	Benjamin Harrison
Party	Democratic	Republican
Home state	New York	Indiana
Running mate	Allen G. Thurman	Levi P. Morton
Electoral vote	3	0
Popular vote	16,414	12,973
Percentage	55.10%	43.55%
County results
Cleveland
50–60%
Harrison
40–50%
President before election
Grover Cleveland
Democratic
Elected President
Benjamin Harrison
Republican

The 1888 United States presidential election in Delaware took place on November 6, 1888, as part of the 1888 United States presidential election. Voters chose three representatives, or electors to the Electoral College, who voted for president and vice president.

Delaware voted for the Democratic nominee, incumbent President Grover Cleveland, over the Republican nominee, Benjamin Harrison. Cleveland won the state by a margin of 11.55%.

This was the last time until 2000 that a Republican was elected president without winning Delaware.

== Results ==
General Election Results
Party	Pledged to	Elector	Votes
Democratic Party	Grover Cleveland	Caleb P. Johnson	16,414
Democratic Party	Grover Cleveland	Robert Hill	16,406
Democratic Party	Grover Cleveland	William T. Records	16,391
Republican Party	Benjamin Harrison	Joshua H. Marvel	12,973
Republican Party	Benjamin Harrison	Joseph R. Whitaker	12,952
Republican Party	Benjamin Harrison	Henry du Pont	12,950
Prohibition Party	Clinton B. Fisk	Benjamin Hitch	400
Prohibition Party	Clinton B. Fisk	William Denney	399
Prohibition Party	Clinton B. Fisk	Henry S. Kent	399
Write-in		Scattering	1
Votes cast (Note: Based on highest elector on each ticket)			29,788

=== Results by county ===
County	Grover Cleveland Democratic		Benjamin Harrison Republican		Clinton B. Fisk Prohibition		Margin		Total votes cast
County	#	%	#	%	#	%	#	%	Total votes cast
Kent	3,969	57.80%	2,797	40.73%	101	1.47%	1,172	17.07%	6,867
New Castle	8,463	57.24%	6,130	41.46%	192	1.30%	2,333	15.78%	14,786 (Note: Includes 1 Scattering vote)
Sussex	3,982	48.95%	4,046	49.74%	107	1.32%	-64	-0.79%	8,135
Totals	16,414	55.10%	12,973	43.55%	400	1.34%	3,441	11.55%	29,788

==== Counties that flipped from Democratic to Republican ====
- Sussex

== See also ==
- United States presidential elections in Delaware
