= Kent County, Delaware =

County in Delaware, United States

- County of Delaware
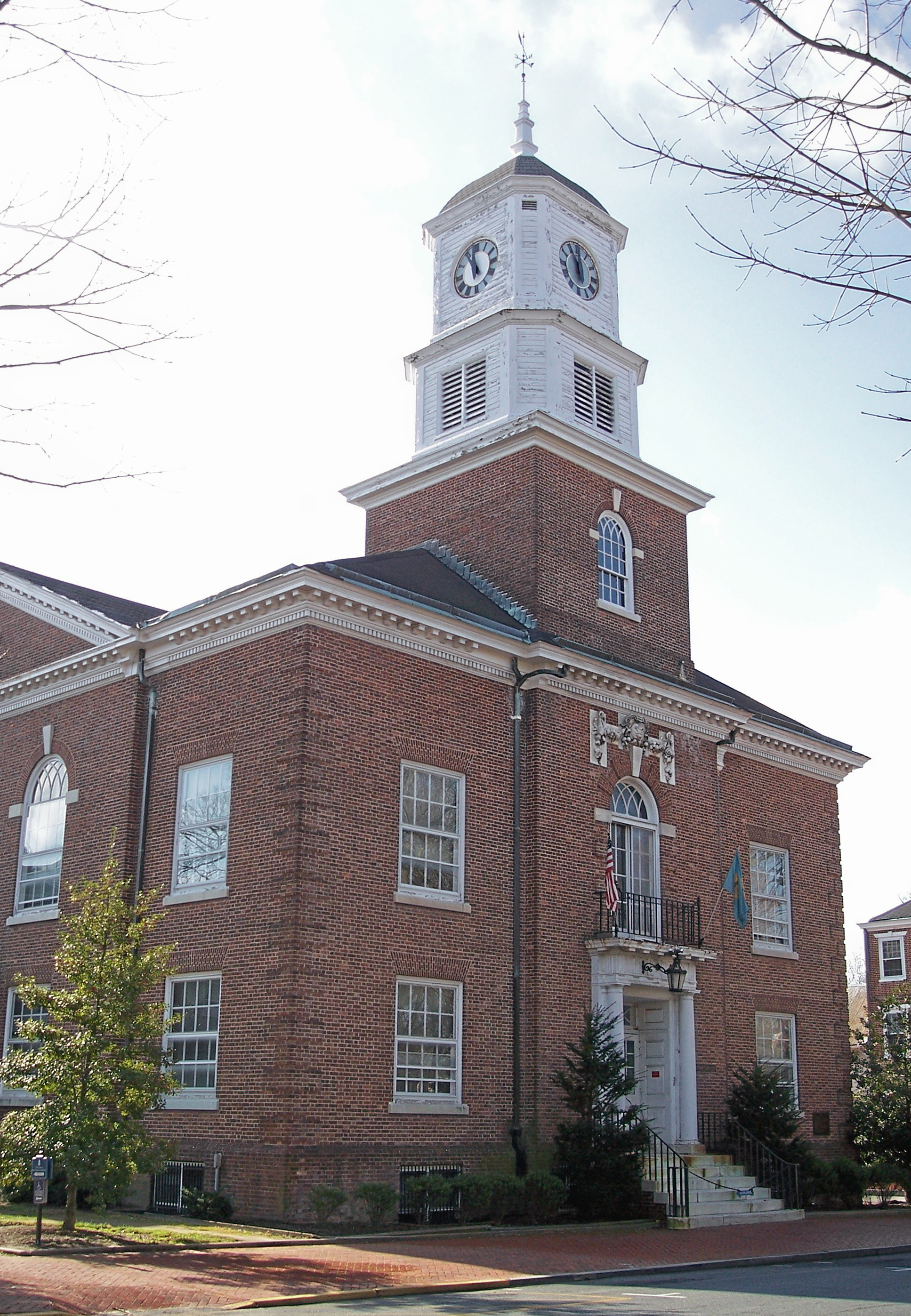
- The Kent County Courthouse in Dover in 2006

- Flag Seal

- Location within the U.S. state of Delaware
- Coordinates: 39°06′N 75°30′W
- Country: United States
- State: Delaware
- Founded: August 8, 1683
- Named for: Kent, England
- Seat: Dover
- Largest city: Dover

Area
  - Total: 798 sq mi (2,070 km^{2})
  - Land: 586 sq mi (1,520 km^{2})
  - Water: 212 sq mi (550 km^{2}) 26.6%

Population (2020)
  - Total: 181,851
  - Estimate (2025): 194,786 ▲
  - Density: 310.33/sq mi (119.82/km^{2})
- Time zone: UTC−5 (Eastern)
  - Summer (DST): UTC−4 (EDT)
- Congressional district: At-large
- Website: www.kentcountyde.gov

Kent County is a county located in the central part of the U.S. state of Delaware. As of the 2020 census, the population was 181,851, making it the least populous county in Delaware, but the most populous county in the United States to be the least populous in its state. The county seat is Dover, the state capital of Delaware. It is named for Kent, an English county.

Kent County comprises the Dover metropolitan area, which is included in the Philadelphia metropolitan area.

== History ==
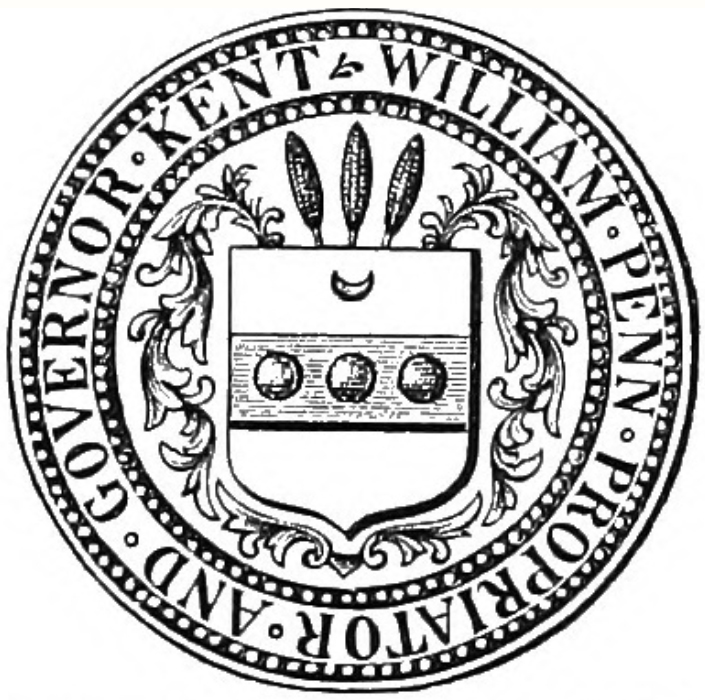
1683 Seal of Kent County

In about 1670 the English began to settle in the valley of the St. Jones River, earlier known as Wolf Creek. On June 21, 1680, the Duke of York chartered St. Jones County, which was carved out of New Amstel/New Castle and Hoarkill/Sussex counties. St. Jones County was transferred to William Penn on August 24, 1682, and became part of Penn's newly chartered Delaware Colony.

Penn ordered a court town to be laid out, and the courthouse was built in 1697. The town of Dover, named after the town of Dover in England's Kent, was finally laid out in 1717, in what was then known as the Lower Counties. It was designated as the capital of Delaware in 1777. In 1787 Delaware was first state to ratify the U.S. Constitution, and became "the First State." Through much of the late 18th century, the economy of Kent County was based on small grain farms. As a result, farmers did not need as many slaves as owners of tobacco plantations. Delaware had a high proportion of free blacks among its African-American population by the early 19th century.

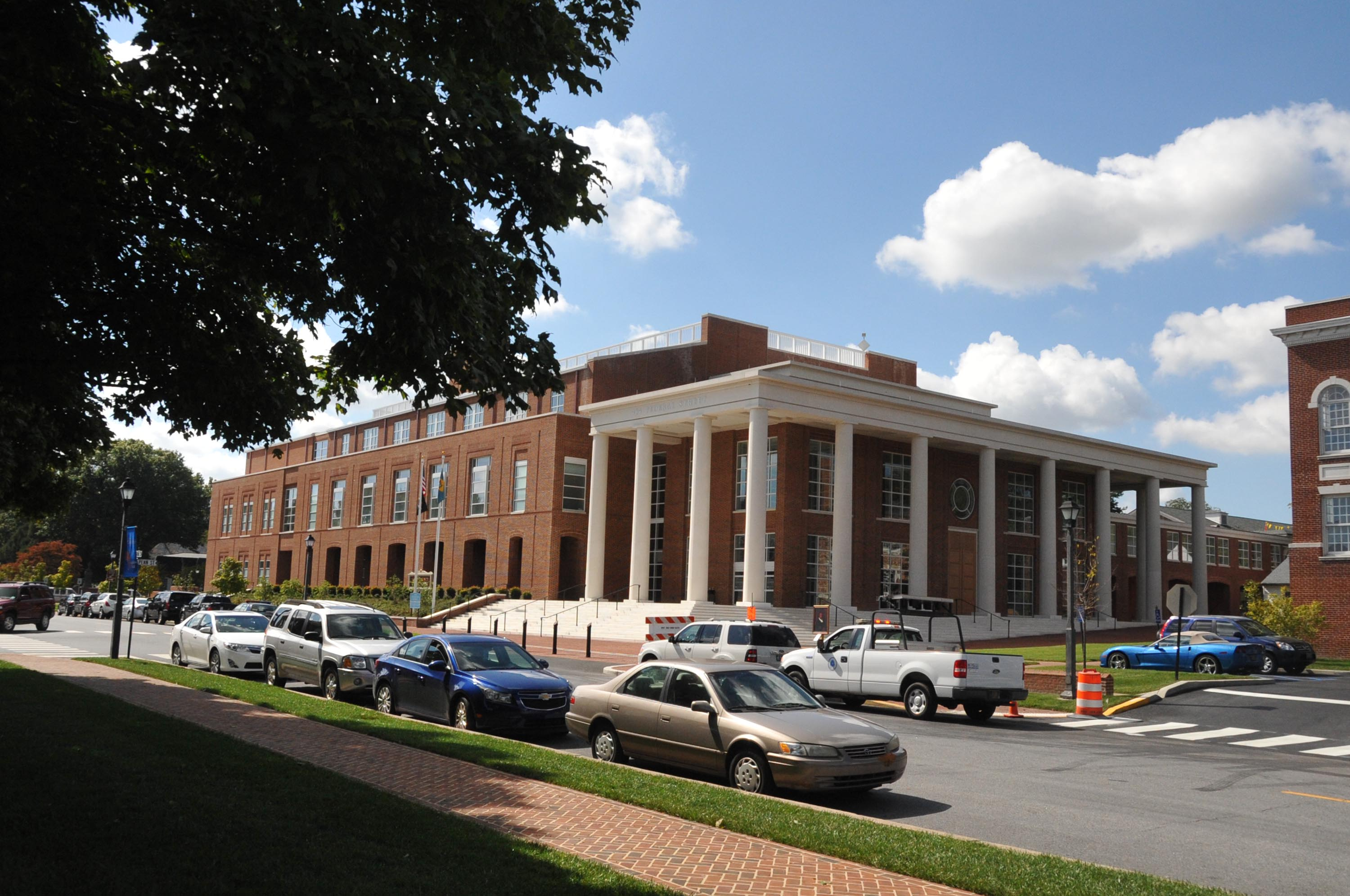
The new courthouse

In the 1960s, Dover was a center of manufacturing of spacesuits worn by NASA astronauts in the Apollo moon flights by ILC Dover, now based in the small town of Frederica. The suits, dubbed the "A7L," was first flown on the Apollo 7 mission in October 1967, and was the suit worn by Neil Armstrong and Buzz Aldrin on the Apollo 11 mission. The company still manufactures spacesuits to this day—the present-day Space Shuttle "soft" suit components (the arms and legs of the suit).

== Geography ==
According to the U.S. Census Bureau, the county has a total area of 798 square miles (2,070 km^{2}), of which 586 square miles (1,520 km^{2}) is land and 212 square miles (550 km^{2}) (26.6%) is water.

Kent County, like all of Delaware's counties, is subdivided into Hundreds. There are several explanations given for how the Hundreds were arrived at, either being an area containing 100 families, an area containing 100 people, or an area that could raise 100 militiamen. Kent County was originally apportioned into six Hundreds: Duck Creek, Little Creek, Dover, Murderkill, Milford and Mispillion. In 1867, the Delaware legislature split Murderkill Hundred into North Murderkill Hundred and South Murderkill Hundred. In 1869, the legislature formed Kenton Hundred from parts of Little Creek and Duck Creek Hundred. Today the county contains eight Hundreds.

=== Adjacent counties ===
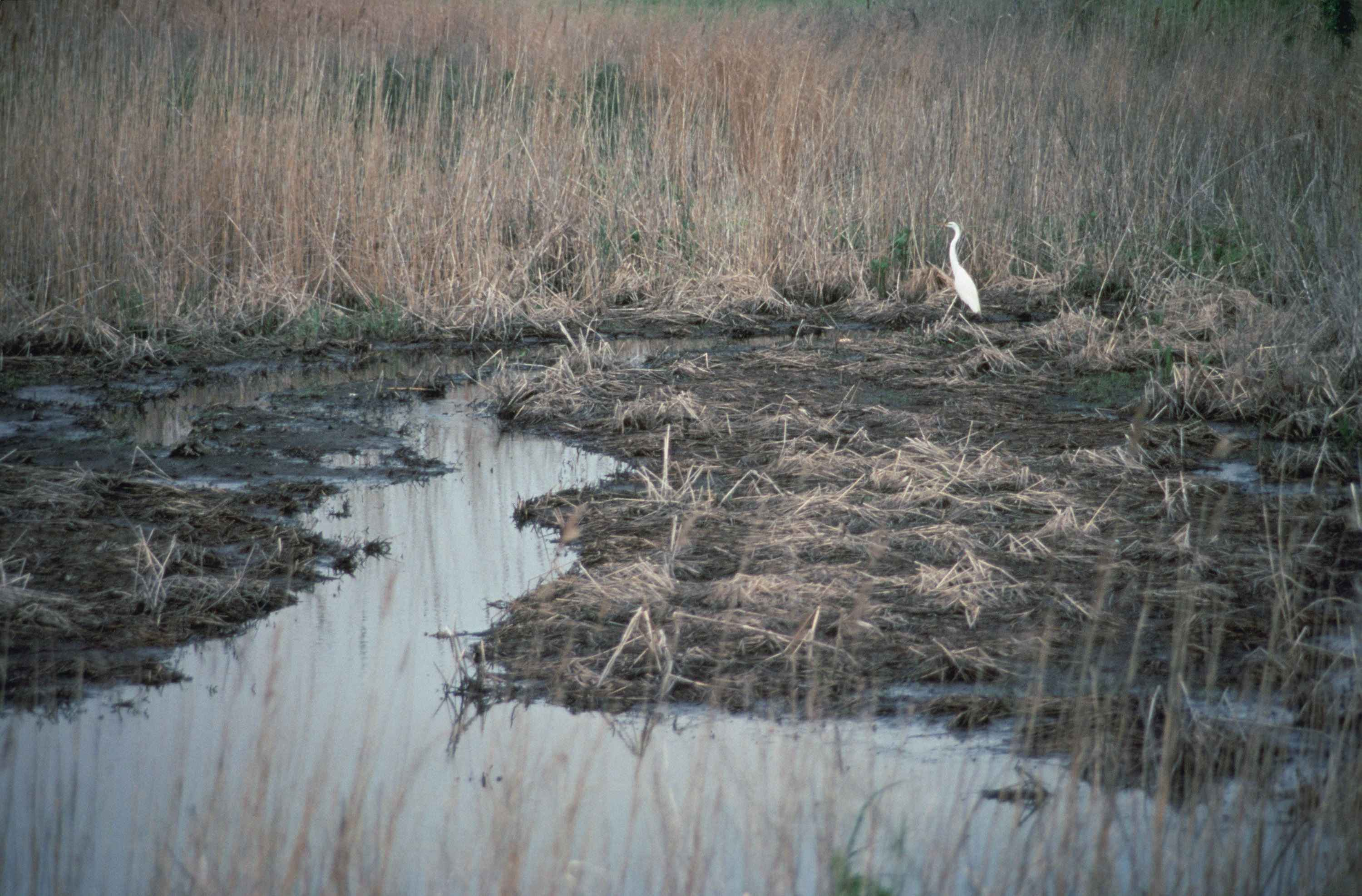
Bombay Hook National Wildlife Refuge

- New Castle County - north
- Salem County, New Jersey - northeast
- Cumberland County, New Jersey - east
- Cape May County, New Jersey - east
- Sussex County - south
- Caroline County, Maryland - southwest
- Queen Anne's County, Maryland - west
- Kent County, Maryland - northwest

=== National protected area ===
- Bombay Hook National Wildlife Refuge

=== Climate ===
Kent County has a humid subtropical climate (Cfa) according to the Köppen climate classification. The Trewartha climate classification considers the climate oceanic (Do) because only seven months average above 50 °F (above 10 °C.) All months average above freezing, and Dover has three months averaging above 22 °C (72 °F). The hardiness zone is 7b.

Climate data for Dover, Delaware (1991−2020 normals, extremes 1893–present)
Month	Jan	Feb	Mar	Apr	May	Jun	Jul	Aug	Sep	Oct	Nov	Dec	Year
Record high °F (°C)	77 (25)	80 (27)	88 (31)	97 (36)	98 (37)	101 (38)	104 (40)	102 (39)	99 (37)	95 (35)	85 (29)	75 (24)	104 (40)
Mean maximum °F (°C)	65.7 (18.7)	65.4 (18.6)	73.5 (23.1)	83.0 (28.3)	88.1 (31.2)	93.1 (33.9)	95.4 (35.2)	93.1 (33.9)	89.0 (31.7)	82.8 (28.2)	73.9 (23.3)	66.1 (18.9)	96.1 (35.6)
Mean daily maximum °F (°C)	44.4 (6.9)	47.4 (8.6)	54.5 (12.5)	66.0 (18.9)	74.4 (23.6)	82.7 (28.2)	86.9 (30.5)	85.1 (29.5)	79.2 (26.2)	68.9 (20.5)	58.0 (14.4)	48.6 (9.2)	66.3 (19.1)
Daily mean °F (°C)	36.0 (2.2)	38.2 (3.4)	45.0 (7.2)	55.5 (13.1)	64.4 (18.0)	73.2 (22.9)	77.9 (25.5)	76.2 (24.6)	70.1 (21.2)	59.2 (15.1)	48.7 (9.3)	40.3 (4.6)	57.1 (13.9)
Mean daily minimum °F (°C)	27.6 (−2.4)	29.0 (−1.7)	35.4 (1.9)	44.9 (7.2)	54.4 (12.4)	63.8 (17.7)	69.0 (20.6)	67.3 (19.6)	61.0 (16.1)	49.5 (9.7)	39.3 (4.1)	32.1 (0.1)	47.8 (8.8)
Mean minimum °F (°C)	10.8 (−11.8)	13.3 (−10.4)	20.5 (−6.4)	31.1 (−0.5)	40.7 (4.8)	51.0 (10.6)	59.5 (15.3)	58.4 (14.7)	47.7 (8.7)	34.4 (1.3)	24.0 (−4.4)	17.8 (−7.9)	8.8 (−12.9)
Record low °F (°C)	−7 (−22)	−11 (−24)	7 (−14)	14 (−10)	28 (−2)	41 (5)	45 (7)	35 (2)	30 (−1)	25 (−4)	11 (−12)	−3 (−19)	−11 (−24)
Average precipitation inches (mm)	3.43 (87)	3.08 (78)	4.21 (107)	3.72 (94)	3.89 (99)	4.56 (116)	4.14 (105)	4.92 (125)	4.25 (108)	4.06 (103)	3.36 (85)	3.99 (101)	47.61 (1,209)
Average snowfall inches (cm)	4.1 (10)	5.9 (15)	0.6 (1.5)	0.0 (0.0)	0.0 (0.0)	0.0 (0.0)	0.0 (0.0)	0.0 (0.0)	0.0 (0.0)	0.0 (0.0)	0.0 (0.0)	2.6 (6.6)	13.2 (34)
Average precipitation days (≥ 0.01 in)	9.7	9.2	9.8	10.3	10.5	9.2	9.0	8.2	8.2	8.0	7.4	10.2	109.7
Average snowy days (≥ 0.1 in)	1.8	1.9	0.4	0.0	0.0	0.0	0.0	0.0	0.0	0.0	0.0	0.8	4.9
Average ultraviolet index	2	3	5	6	8	9	9	8	7	4	2	2	5
Source 1: NOAA
Source 2: Weather Atlas (UV)

== Transportation ==
=== Major highways ===
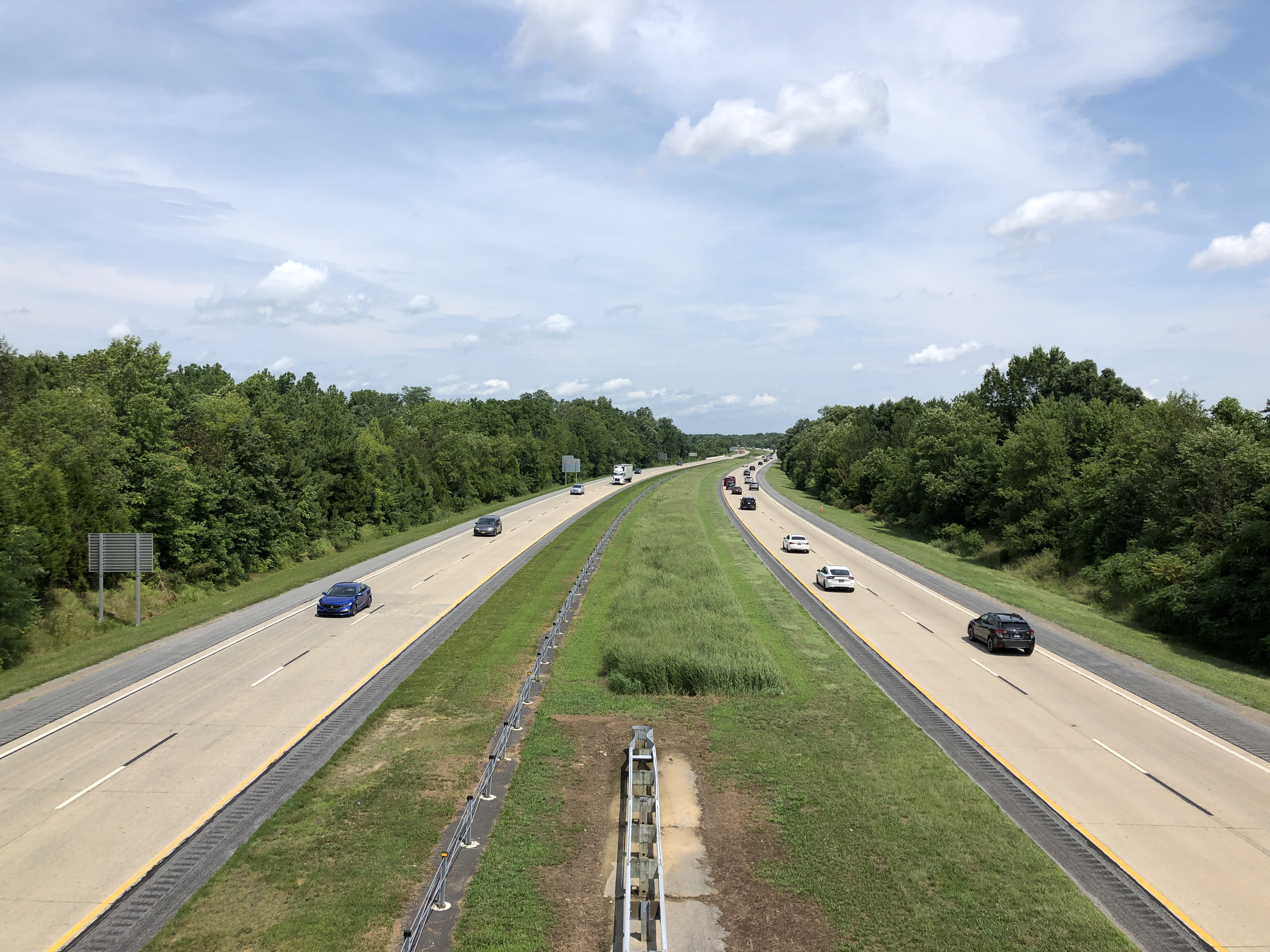
The DE 1 toll road in Smyrna, northern Kent County

The following state highways are located in Kent County:

- US 13
- US 113
- DE 1
- DE 6
- DE 8
- DE 9
- DE 10
- DE 11
- DE 12
- DE 14
- DE 15
- DE 16
- DE 42
- DE 44
- DE 300

=== Railroads ===
The Delmarva Central Railroad operates two freight lines through Kent County. The Delmarva Subdivision runs north–south along the US 13 corridor through Farmington, Harrington, Felton, Wyoming, Dover, Cheswold, and Clayton and the Indian River Subdivision branches from the Delmarva Subdivision at Harrington and runs east to Houston and Milford along the DE 14 corridor. There is no passenger rail service in the county.

=== Public transportation ===
DART First State operates bus service within Kent County. There are several local bus routes that serve the Dover area. In addition, DART First State operates inter-county service to Wilmington, Newark, Georgetown, and Lewes, along with seasonal service to Lewes and Rehoboth Beach.

=== Airports ===
Kent County contains the following public-use and military airports:

- Chandelle Estates Airport in Dover
- Chorman Airport in Farmington
- Dover Air Force Base in Dover
- Delaware Airpark in Cheswold
- Henderson Aviation Airport in Felton
- Jenkins Airport in Wyoming
- Smyrna Airport in Smyrna

== Government and politics ==
United States presidential election results for Kent County, Delaware
Year	Republican		Democratic		Third party(ies)	
Year	No.	%	No.	%	No.	%
1832	1,167	53.56%	1,012	46.44%	0	0.00%
1836	1,205	53.70%	1,039	46.30%	0	0.00%
1840	1,593	59.20%	1,095	40.69%	3	0.11%
1844	1,583	52.80%	1,415	47.20%	0	0.00%
1848	1,497	52.79%	1,337	47.14%	2	0.07%
1852	1,591	52.80%	1,422	47.20%	0	0.00%
1856	3	0.08%	2,083	57.61%	1,530	42.31%
1860	1,075	32.59%	143	4.33%	2,081	63.08%
1864	1,652	40.72%	2,405	59.28%	0	0.00%
1868	1,523	34.60%	2,879	65.40%	0	0.00%
1872	2,436	45.37%	2,863	53.32%	70	1.30%
1876	1,935	37.12%	3,278	62.88%	0	0.00%
1880	3,042	45.34%	3,665	54.62%	3	0.04%
1884	2,126	34.85%	3,975	65.15%	0	0.00%
1888	2,797	40.73%	3,969	57.80%	101	1.47%
1892	3,550	48.14%	3,720	50.45%	104	1.41%
1896	3,567	51.45%	3,149	45.42%	217	3.13%
1900	3,930	49.76%	3,857	48.84%	111	1.41%
1904	4,549	53.87%	3,779	44.75%	117	1.39%
1908	4,158	49.77%	4,093	48.99%	104	1.24%
1912	3,192	40.22%	4,071	51.30%	673	8.48%
1916	3,813	47.14%	4,210	52.05%	66	0.82%
1920	6,511	46.88%	7,211	51.92%	167	1.20%
1924	6,894	49.17%	6,936	49.47%	192	1.37%
1928	8,335	59.16%	5,727	40.65%	27	0.19%
1932	6,597	42.59%	8,829	57.00%	64	0.41%
1936	7,389	43.45%	9,588	56.38%	28	0.16%
1940	8,079	46.69%	9,226	53.31%	0	0.00%
1944	7,069	47.05%	7,900	52.58%	57	0.38%
1948	8,501	50.63%	8,174	48.68%	115	0.68%
1952	10,144	50.45%	9,874	49.10%	90	0.45%
1956	10,303	52.18%	9,319	47.20%	123	0.62%
1960	10,697	49.49%	10,754	49.75%	165	0.76%
1964	9,006	40.84%	12,981	58.86%	67	0.30%
1968	11,082	44.53%	9,055	36.38%	4,751	19.09%
1972	17,712	62.03%	10,463	36.64%	381	1.33%
1976	12,604	42.83%	16,523	56.15%	301	1.02%
1980	14,882	49.84%	12,884	43.15%	2,096	7.02%
1984	21,531	64.46%	11,789	35.29%	83	0.25%
1988	19,923	60.17%	12,996	39.25%	194	0.59%
1992	15,562	38.67%	15,364	38.18%	9,312	23.14%
1996	15,932	40.59%	18,327	46.69%	4,993	12.72%
2000	24,081	49.90%	22,790	47.23%	1,383	2.87%
2004	31,578	56.40%	23,875	42.64%	538	0.96%
2008	29,827	44.57%	36,392	54.38%	706	1.05%
2012	32,135	46.79%	35,527	51.73%	1,018	1.48%
2016	36,991	49.50%	33,351	44.63%	4,387	5.87%
2020	41,009	47.12%	44,552	51.19%	1,464	1.68%
2024	42,458	48.09%	44,222	50.09%	1,609	1.82%

Kent County is governed by the Kent County Levy Court, which consists of seven members, six of whom are elected by district and the seventh who is elected at-large. The current members of the Kent County Levy Court are:

- Joanne Masten (D) - 1st district
- Jeffrey W. Hall (D) - 2nd district
- Allan F. Angel (D) - 3rd district (vice president)
- Robert J. Scott (R) - 4th district
- George Jody Sweeney (D) - 5th district
- Paul Hertz - (R) 6th district
- Terry L. Pepper (D) - at-large (president)

The county row offices are held by:

- Eugenia Thornton - recorder of deeds
- Harold K. Brode (D) - register of wills
- Brenda A. Wootten (D) - clerk of the peace
- Norman Barlow (R) - sheriff

Politically, Kent County is a swing county in local, state, and federal elections. The county is often used in state politics to determine a party or candidate's strength in statewide elections, and is often considered a bellwether county, having voting for the winner of the national presidential election in 17 out of the last 19 presidential elections. In the 2016 general elections, Republican presidential nominee Donald Trump won Kent County with 49.81% of the vote, compared to Democratic nominee Hillary Clinton's 44.91% out of 74,260 votes cast. In the 2020 presidential election, Delaware resident Joe Biden took 51.19% of the vote compared to Trump's 47.12%, out of 87,025 votes cast. Trump lost the county in 2024, making him the first Republican in 100 years to win the presidency without the county.

Gubernatorial elections results

Gubernatorial elections results
Year	Republican	Democratic	Third parties
2024	49.75% 42,750	50.25% 43,179	0.0% 0
2020	46.05% 39,332	51.93% 44,352	2.02% 1,731
2016	48.05% 34,777	49.68% 35,955	2.27% 1,646
2012	36.04% 23,846	61.5% 40,696	2.46% 1,628

United States Senate election results for Kent County, Delaware1
Year	Republican		Democratic		Third party(ies)	
Year	No.	%	No.	%	No.	%
2024	39,158	45.39%	44,169	51.20%	2,941	3.41%
2018	27,210	45.54%	31,282	52.35%	1,261	2.11%
2012	22,561	34.03%	40,750	61.47%	2,979	4.49%

United States Senate election results for Kent County, Delaware2
Year	Republican		Democratic		Third party(ies)	
Year	No.	%	No.	%	No.	%
2020	38,571	45.39%	43,893	51.65%	2,511	2.95%
2014	19,527	49.53%	19,218	48.74%	681	1.73%
2010	25,059	52.43%	22,315	46.69%	425	0.89%

In the Delaware General Assembly, eight of the 41 seats in the Delaware State House of Representatives. As of March 2020, Democrats held four seats and Republicans held four seats. In the Delaware State Senate, five senate districts represent parts of Kent County. As of March 2020, there were three Republican seats and two Democratic seats.

Kent County voter registration and party affiliations as of March 30, 2020
Political party	Total voters	Percentage
Democratic	55,270	43.34%
Republican	38,073	29.85%
No Party	31,763	24.91%
Third Parties	2,411	1.90%
Total	127,517	100.00%

== Demographics ==
Historical population
Census	Pop.	Note	%±
1790	18,920		—
1800	19,554		3.4%
1810	20,495		4.8%
1820	20,793		1.5%
1830	19,913		−4.2%
1840	19,872		−0.2%
1850	22,816		14.8%
1860	27,804		21.9%
1870	29,804		7.2%
1880	32,874		10.3%
1890	32,664		−0.6%
1900	32,762		0.3%
1910	32,721		−0.1%
1920	31,023		−5.2%
1930	31,841		2.6%
1940	34,441		8.2%
1950	37,870		10.0%
1960	65,651		73.4%
1970	81,892		24.7%
1980	98,219		19.9%
1990	110,993		13.0%
2000	126,697		14.1%
2010	162,310		28.1%
2020	181,851		12.0%
2025 (est.)	194,786	▲	7.1%
U.S. Decennial Census; 1790-1960 1900-1990; 1990-2000 2010-2020

=== Racial and ethnic composition ===
Kent County, Delaware – racial and ethnic composition Note: the US Census treats Hispanic/Latino as an ethnic category. This table excludes Latinos from the racial categories and assigns them to a separate category. Hispanics/Latinos may be of any race.
Race / ethnicity (NH = Non-Hispanic)	Pop 1970	Pop 1980	Pop 1990	Pop 2000	Pop 2010	Pop 2020	% 1970	% 1980	% 1990	% 2000	% 2010	% 2020
White alone (NH)	67,857	77,372	86,071	91,325	105,891	104,845	82.86%	78.77%	77.55%	72.08%	65.24%	57.65%
Black or African American alone (NH)	12,999	17,581	20,316	25,770	37,812	45,737	15.87%	17.90%	18.30%	20.34%	23.30%	25.15%
Native American or Alaska Native alone (NH)	144	318	596	763	916	864	0.18%	0.32%	0.54%	0.60%	0.56%	0.48%
Asian alone (NH)	260	865	1,354	2,104	3,266	4,362	0.32%	0.88%	1.22%	1.66%	2.01%	2.40%
Native Hawaiian or Pacific Islander alone (NH)	x	x	x	41	74	107	x	x	x	0.03%	0.05%	0.06%
Other race alone (NH)	632	354	116	234	347	1,028	0.77%	0.36%	0.10%	0.18%	0.21%	0.57%
Mixed-race or multiracial (NH)	x	x	x	2,391	4,658	10,927	x	x	x	1.89%	2.87%	6.01%
Hispanic or Latino (any race)	x	1,729	2,540	4,069	9,346	13,981	x	1.76%	2.29%	3.21%	5.76%	7.69%
Total	81,892	98,219	110,993	126,697	162,310	181,851	100.00%	100.00%	100.00%	100.00%	100.00%	100.00%

=== 2020 census ===
As of the 2020 census, the county had a population of 181,851. Of the residents, 23.1% were under the age of 18 and 18.0% were 65 years of age or older; the median age was 38.5 years. For every 100 females there were 92.1 males, and for every 100 females age 18 and over there were 89.1 males. 73.5% of residents lived in urban areas and 26.5% lived in rural areas.

The racial makeup of the county was 59.2% White, 25.8% Black or African American, 0.6% American Indian and Alaska Native, 2.4% Asian, 3.1% from some other race, and 8.7% from two or more races. Hispanic or Latino residents of any race comprised 7.7% of the population.

There were 68,290 households in the county, of which 32.7% had children under the age of 18 living with them and 29.0% had a female householder with no spouse or partner present. About 24.8% of all households were made up of individuals and 11.3% had someone living alone who was 65 years of age or older.

There were 72,708 housing units, of which 6.1% were vacant. Among occupied housing units, 71.0% were owner-occupied and 29.0% were renter-occupied. The homeowner vacancy rate was 1.4% and the rental vacancy rate was 5.9%. The most reported ancestries were:

- African American (16.2%)
- English (14.9%)
- Irish (14.1%)
- German (12.9%)
- Italian (6.1%)
- Puerto Rican (3.2%)
- Polish (2.7%)
- Scottish (2.3%)
- Mexican (1.8%)
- French (1.7%)

=== 2010 census ===
As of the 2010 census, there were 162,310 people, 60,278 households, and 42,290 families living in the county. The population density was 276.9 inhabitants per square mile (106.9/km^{2}). There were 65,338 housing units at an average density of 111.5 per square mile (43.1/km^{2}). The racial makeup of the county was 67.8% white, 24.0% black or African American, 2.0% Asian, 0.6% American Indian, 0.1% Pacific islander, 2.0% from other races, and 3.5% from two or more races. Those of Hispanic or Latino origin made up 5.8% of the population.{{In terms of ancestry, 17.5% were German, 15.4% were Irish, 11.5% were English, 7.2% were Italian, and 5.9% were American.

Of the 60,278 households, 35.6% had children under the age of 18 living with them, 50.1% were married couples living together, 14.9% had a female householder with no husband present, 29.8% were non-families, and 23.6% of all households were made up of individuals. The average household size was 2.62 and the average family size was 3.09. The median age was 36.6 years.{{The median income for a household in the county was $53,183 and the median income for a family was $60,949. Males had a median income of $43,418 versus $35,603 for females. The per capita income for the county was $24,194. About 9.3% of families and 12.5% of the population were below the poverty line, including 21.0% of those under age 18 and 7.7% of those age 65 or over.

=== 2000 census ===
As of the census of 2000, there were 126,697 people, 47,224 households, and 33,623 families living in the county. The population density was 215 people per square mile (83 people/km^{2}). There were 50,481 housing units at an average density of 86 per square mile (33/km^{2}). The racial makeup of the county was 73.49% White, 20.66% Black or African American, 0.64% Native American, 1.69% Asian, 0.04% Pacific Islander, 1.27% from other races, and 2.22% from two or more races. 3.21% of the population were Hispanic or Latino of any race. 13.3% were of German, 11.3% United States or American, 10.9% Irish, 10.0% English and 5.4% Italian ancestry. 92.5% spoke English and 3.3% Spanish as their first language.

There were 47,224 households, out of which 35.50% had children under the age of 18 living with them, 52.90% were married couples living together, 13.80% had a female householder with no husband present, and 28.80% were non-families. 23.00% of all households were made up of individuals, and 8.40% had someone living alone who was 65 years of age or older. The average household size was 2.61 and the average family size was 3.06.

In the county, the population was spread out, with 27.30% under the age of 18, 10.10% from 18 to 24, 29.80% from 25 to 44, 21.20% from 45 to 64, and 11.70% who were 65 years of age or older. The median age was 34 years. For every 100 females there were 93.10 males. For every 100 females age 18 and over, there were 89.60 males.

The median income for a household in the county was $40,950, and the median income for a family was $46,504. Males had a median income of $32,660 versus $24,706 for females. The per capita income for the county was $18,662. About 8.10% of families and 10.70% of the population were below the poverty line, including 14.80% of those under age 18 and 8.80% of those age 65 or over.

=== 2021 American Community Survey estimates ===
In 2021, there were 66,720 households and an average of 2.63 people per household; 88.2% of residents had been living in the same residence one year earlier. The median household income for the county was $63,715; the county had a per capita income of $30,804. An estimated 12.2% of the population lived at or below the poverty line.

=== Amish community ===
Kent County is home to an Amish community residing to the west of Dover, consisting of nine church districts and about 1,650 people. The Amish first settled in Kent County in 1915 after migrations from Wisconsin, Montana, Alabama, and Ohio. The area is home to several Amish businesses selling food, furniture, quilts, and handmade crafts. Every September, the Amish Country Bike Tour, one of the largest cycling events in Delaware, takes place in the area. In recent years, increasing development has led to the decline in the number of Amish living in the community.

== Communities ==
=== Cities ===
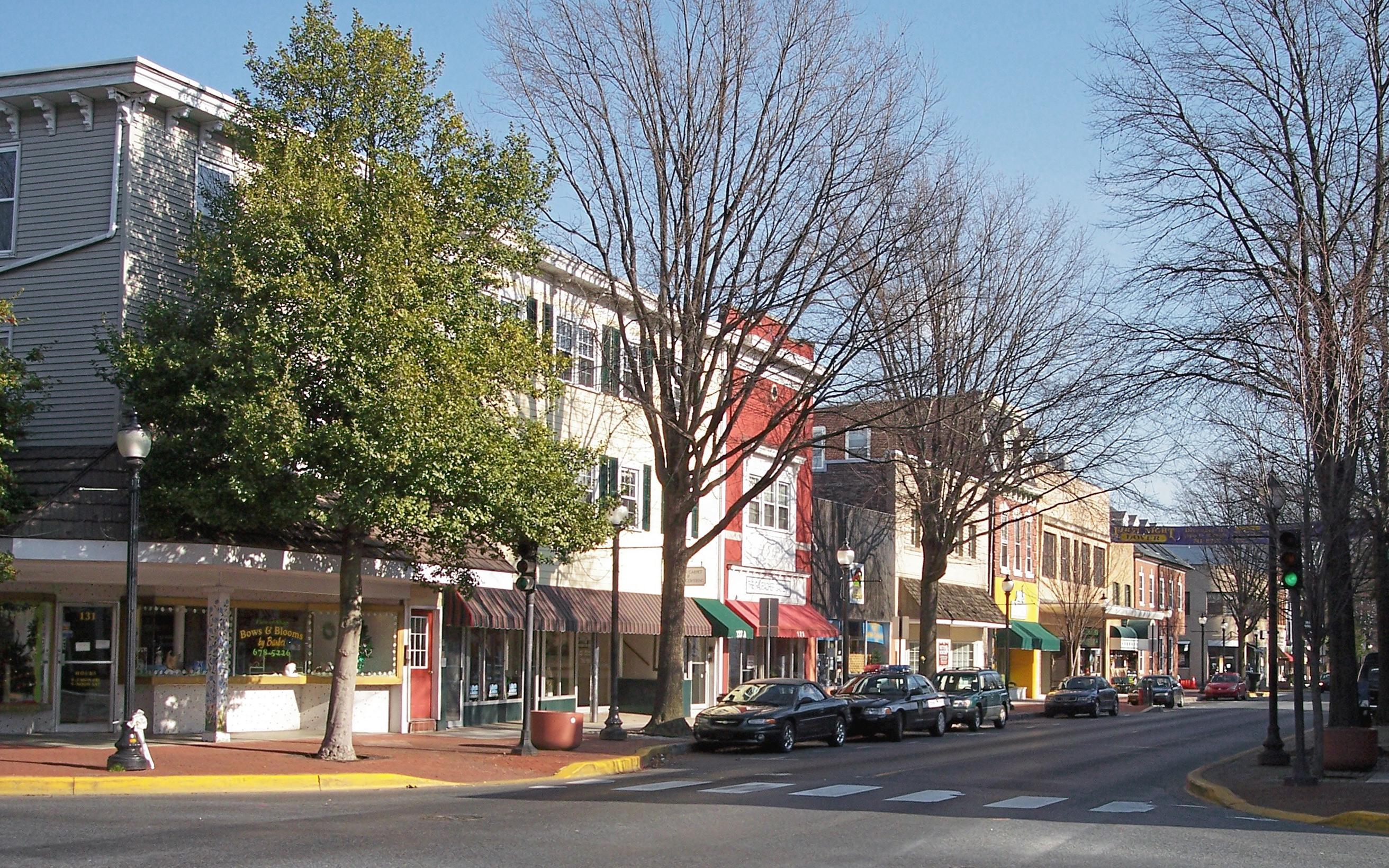
Dover

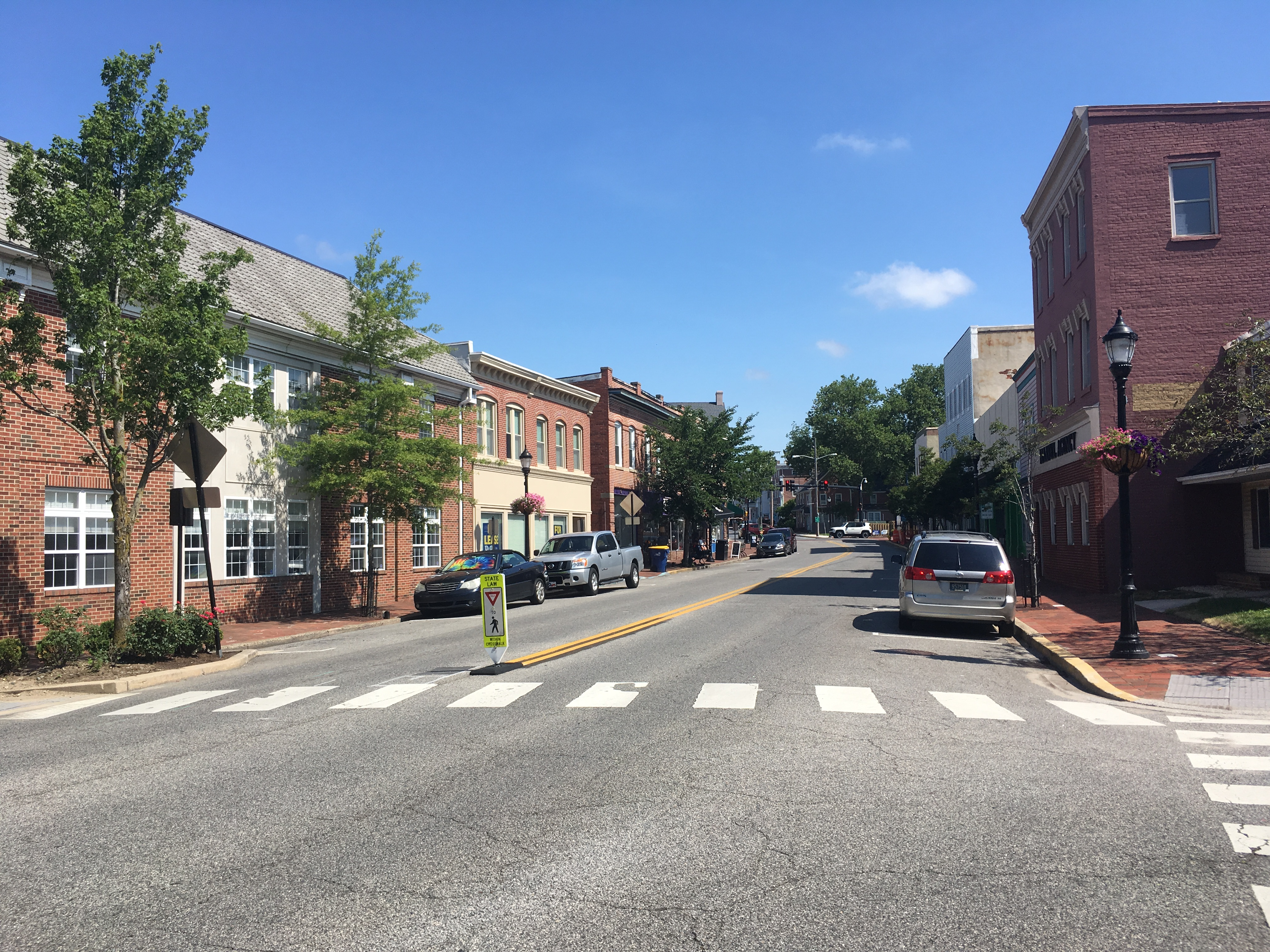
Milford

- Dover
- Harrington
- Milford (partly in Sussex County)

=== Towns ===
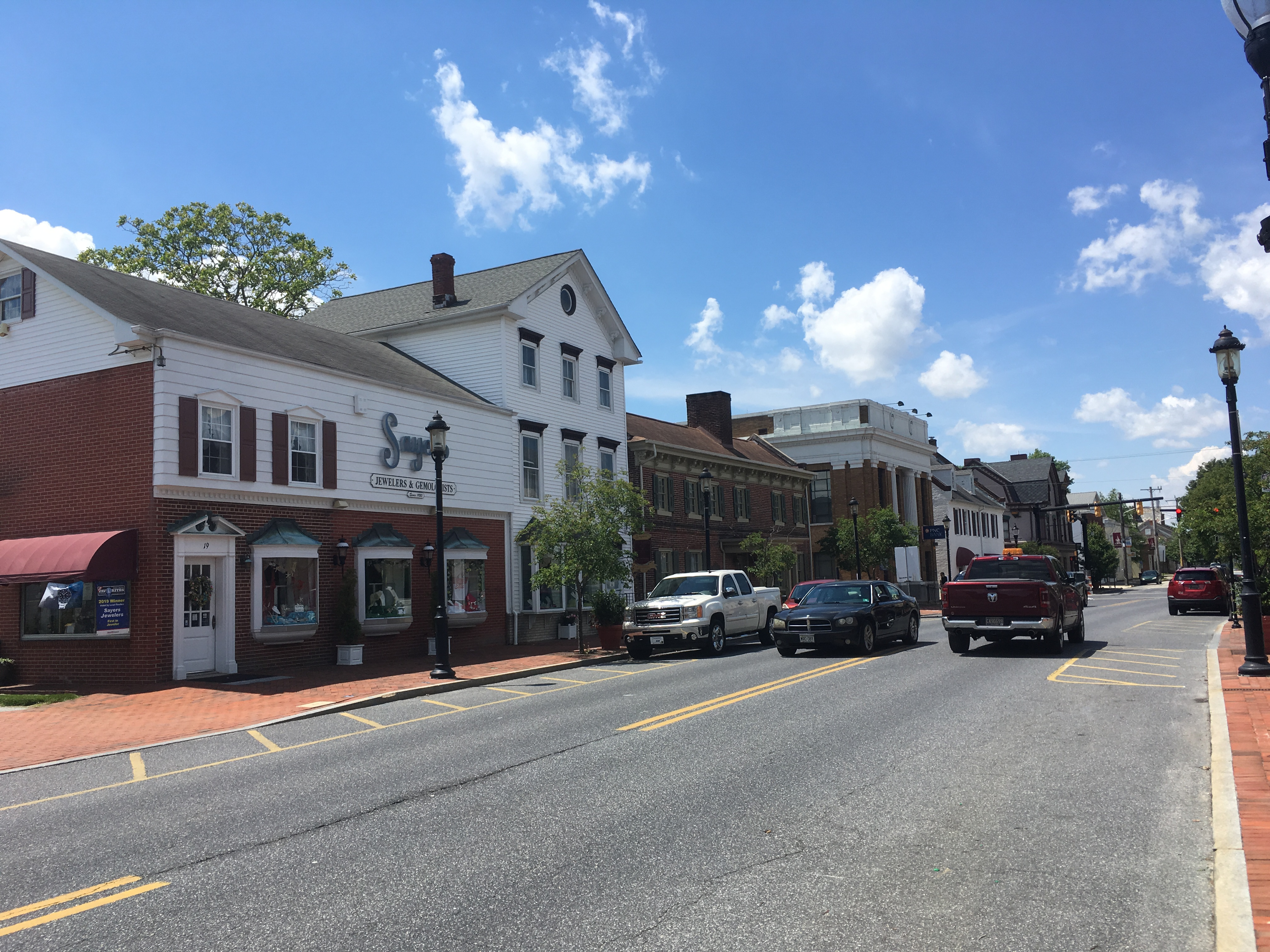
Smyrna

- Bowers
- Camden
- Cheswold
- Clayton (partly in New Castle County)
- Farmington
- Felton
- Frederica
- Hartly
- Houston
- Kenton
- Leipsic
- Little Creek
- Magnolia
- Smyrna (partly in New Castle County)
- Viola
- Woodside
- Wyoming

=== Census-designated places ===
- Dover Air Force Base
- Highland Acres
- Kent Acres
- Rising Sun-Lebanon
- Riverview
- Rodney Village
- Woodside East

=== Unincorporated localities ===
- Andrewville
- Berrytown
- Little Heaven
- Marydel
- Woodland Beach

== Education ==
=== K-12 education ===
School districts include:

- Caesar Rodney School District
- Capital School District
- Lake Forest School District
- Milford School District
- Smyrna School District
- Woodbridge School District

In 2010, 14.8% of the county students enrolled in K-12 schools were in private institutions. St. Thomas More Academy was formerly in the county.

In the period of de jure educational segregation in the United States, K-12 students of black African descent attended segregated schools. William W. M. Henry Comprehensive High School District 133 housed high school students of black African descent during the period 1952 to 1966. Desegregation occurred after 1966.

In 2023, Sean Greene of WDEL (AM) stated: "there is relatively light competition for traditional public students in Kent and Sussex County [sic] outside of school choice."

=== Higher education ===
Tertiary institutions include:

- Delaware State University (DSU)

Wesley College merged into DSU in 2021.

== See also ==
- National Register of Historic Places listings in Kent County, Delaware
