= Chandelle Estates Airport =

Airport in Kent County, Delaware, US

Chandelle Airport
- IATA: none; ICAO: none; FAA LID: 0N4

Summary
- Airport type: Public
- Serves: Dover, Delaware
- Location: Kent County, Delaware
- Time zone: UTC−05:00 (-5)
  - Summer (DST): UTC−04:00 (-4)
- Elevation AMSL: 22 ft (6.7 m)
- Coordinates: 39°12′08″N 075°29′08″W

Map
- Interactive map of Chandelle Airport

Runways
Direction	Length		Surface
Direction	ft	m	Surface
4/22	2,533	772	Asphalt

Statistics (2022)
- Aircraft operations: 2,630
- Source: Federal Aviation Administration

Chandelle Airport (FAA LID: 0N4) is a privately owned, public use airport located three nautical miles (6 km) northeast of the central business district of Dover, in Kent County, Delaware, United States.

== Facilities and aircraft ==
Chandelle Estates Airport covers an area of 27 acres (11 ha) at an elevation of 22 feet (7 m) above mean sea level. It has one asphalt paved runway designated 4/22 which measures 2,533 by 28 feet (772 x 9 m).

For the 12-month period ending December 31, 2022, the airport had 2,630 aircraft operations, an average of 50 per week: 99% general aviation and 1% military. This is down from 6,800 movements in 2007. For the same time period in 2022, there were 23 aircraft based at the airport, all airplanes: 21 single-engine and 2 multi-engine.

The airport has a fixed-base operator that sells fuel – both avgas and jet fuel – as well as a hangar and courtesy transportation.

== Accidents and incidents ==
- On May 13, 2005, a Piper PA28 impacted terrain after departure from Chandelle Airport. The pilot reported there was a substantial decrease in power on climbout; he lowered the nose to gain airspeed and tried to adjust the throttle but got no response. Postaccident examination of the exhaust system revealed that a portion of the internal baffle in the muffler assembly had separated from the surrounding structure, and was free to move around inside the muffler. Further examination of the exhaust system showed that the tailpipe was equipped with an arch shaped standoff assembly that extended from the inboard end of the tailpipe and protruded into the muffler. The probable cause of the accident was found to be the separated baffle, which blocked the tailpipe and caused a total loss of engine power.
- On July 13, 2013, a Piper PA28 crashed near the airport. The sole occupant was hospitalized.
- On September 30, 2017, a Cessna 172 Skyhawk crashed while landing at Chandelle Airport. The aircraft overshot the runway.

== See also ==
- List of airports in Delaware
