= Laurel Airport (Delaware) =

- IATA: none; ICAO: none; FAA LID: N06

Summary
- Airport type: Public
- Owner: Dest Inc.
- Serves: Laurel, Delaware
- Time zone: UTC−05:00 (-5)
  - Summer (DST): UTC−04:00 (-4)
- Elevation AMSL: 30 ft / 9 m
- Coordinates: 38°32′32″N 075°35′40″W

Map
- Interactive map of Laurel Airport

Runways
| Direction | Length | | Surface |
| Direction | ft | m | Surface |
|---|---|---|---|
| 15/33 | 3,175 | 968 | Turf |

Statistics (2022)
- Aircraft operations: 4,100
- Source: Federal Aviation Administration

Laurel Airport (FAA LID: N06) is a public-use airport located one nautical mile (2 km) southwest of the central business district of Laurel, a city in Sussex County, Delaware, United States. It is privately owned by Dest Inc.

It is currently referred to as Laurel Airport by both the Federal Aviation Administration and Delaware Department of Transportation. However, it had been renamed Western Sussex Airport-Booth Field by a prior owner known as Aerospace House Inc.

== Facilities and aircraft ==
Laurel Airport covers an area of 88 acres (36 ha) at an elevation of 30 feet (9 m) above mean sea level. It has one runway designated 15/33, with a turf surface measuring 3,175 by 270 ft (968 x 82 m).

For the 12-month period ending December 31, 2022, the airport had 4,100 general aviation aircraft operations, an average of 79 per week. At that time, there were 7 aircraft based at the airport, all single-engine airplanes.

The airport also offers a skydiving program, Skydive Delmarva.

== See also ==
- List of airports in Delaware
