= List of airports in Delaware =

This is a list of airports in Delaware (a U.S. state), grouped by type and sorted by location. It contains all public-use and military airports in the state. Some private-use and former airports may be included where notable, such as airports that were previously public-use, those with commercial enplanements recorded by the FAA or airports assigned an IATA airport code.

From 2008 to 2013, Delaware was the only U.S state that had no airports in the FAA category known as commercial service (2,500+ boardings per year). In 2013, scheduled commercial airline passenger service became available at Wilmington Airport, but it ended in 2015. Commercial service to Wilmington Airport resumed in 2021, but ended again on June 6, 2022. Commercial service resumed in 2023.

== Airports ==
This list contains the following information:

- **City served** – The city generally associated with the airport, as per the airport's master record with the Federal Aviation Administration. This is not always the actual location since some airports are located in smaller towns outside of the city they serve. It is not meant to be a complete list of cities served, which can be found in or added to each airport's Wikipedia article.
- **FAA** – The location identifier assigned by the Federal Aviation Administration (FAA). These are linked to each airport's page at the Delaware Department of Transportation.
- **IATA** – The airport code assigned by the International Air Transport Association (IATA). Those that do not match the FAA code are shown in bold.
- **ICAO** – The location indicator assigned by the International Civil Aviation Organization (ICAO).
- **Airport name** – The official airport name. Those shown in **bold** indicate the airport has scheduled passenger service on commercial airlines.
- **Role** – One of four FAA airport categories, as per the 2023–2027 National Plan of Integrated Airport Systems (NPIAS) report released September 2022:
  - P-s: Commercial service – primary are publicly owned airports that receive scheduled passenger service and have more than 10,000 passenger boardings (enplanements) each year. Each primary airport is sub-classified by the FAA as one of the following four "hub" types (s):
    - L: Large hub that accounts for at least 1% of total U.S. passenger enplanements.
    - M: Medium hub that accounts for between 0.25% and 1% of total U.S. passenger enplanements.
    - S: Small hub that accounts for between 0.05% and 0.25% of total U.S. passenger enplanements.
    - N: Nonhub that accounts for less than 0.05% of total U.S. passenger enplanements, but more than 10,000 annual enplanements.
  - CS: Commercial service – nonprimary are publicly owned airports that receive scheduled passenger service and have at least 2,500 passenger boardings each year.
  - R: Reliever airports are designated by the FAA to relieve congestion at a large commercial service airport and to provide more general aviation access to the overall community.
  - GA: General aviation airports are the largest single group of airports in the U.S. airport system. They are public-use airports that do not have scheduled service or have scheduled service with less than 2,500 passenger boardings each year.
- **Enplanements** – The number of enplanements (commercial passenger boardings) that occurred at the airport in calendar year 2024, as per FAA records released 2025.

City served	FAA	IATA	ICAO	Airport name	Role	Enplanements (2024)
				**Commercial service – primary airports**		
Wilmington	ILG	ILG	KILG	**Wilmington Airport**	P-N	125,071
				**Reliever airports**		
Middletown	EVY		KEVY	Summit Airport	R	12
				**General aviation airports**		
Dover / Cheswold	33N			Delaware Airpark	GA	14
Georgetown	GED	GED	KGED	Delaware Coastal Airport	GA	59
				**Other public-use airports** (not listed in NPIAS)		
Dover	0N4			Chandelle Airport		
Farmington	D74			Chorman Airport		
Felton	0N6			Albanna Aviation Airport		
Laurel	N06			Laurel Airport		
Smyrna	38N			Smyrna Airport		
Wyoming	15N			Jenkins Airport		
				**Other military airports**		
Dover	DOV	DOV	KDOV	Dover Air Force Base / Civil Air Terminal at Dover AFB		10
				**Notable former airports**		
Rehoboth Beach	~~REH~~			Rehoboth Airport (closed 1987)		

== See also ==
- Delaware World War II Army Airfields
