= Delaware Airpark =

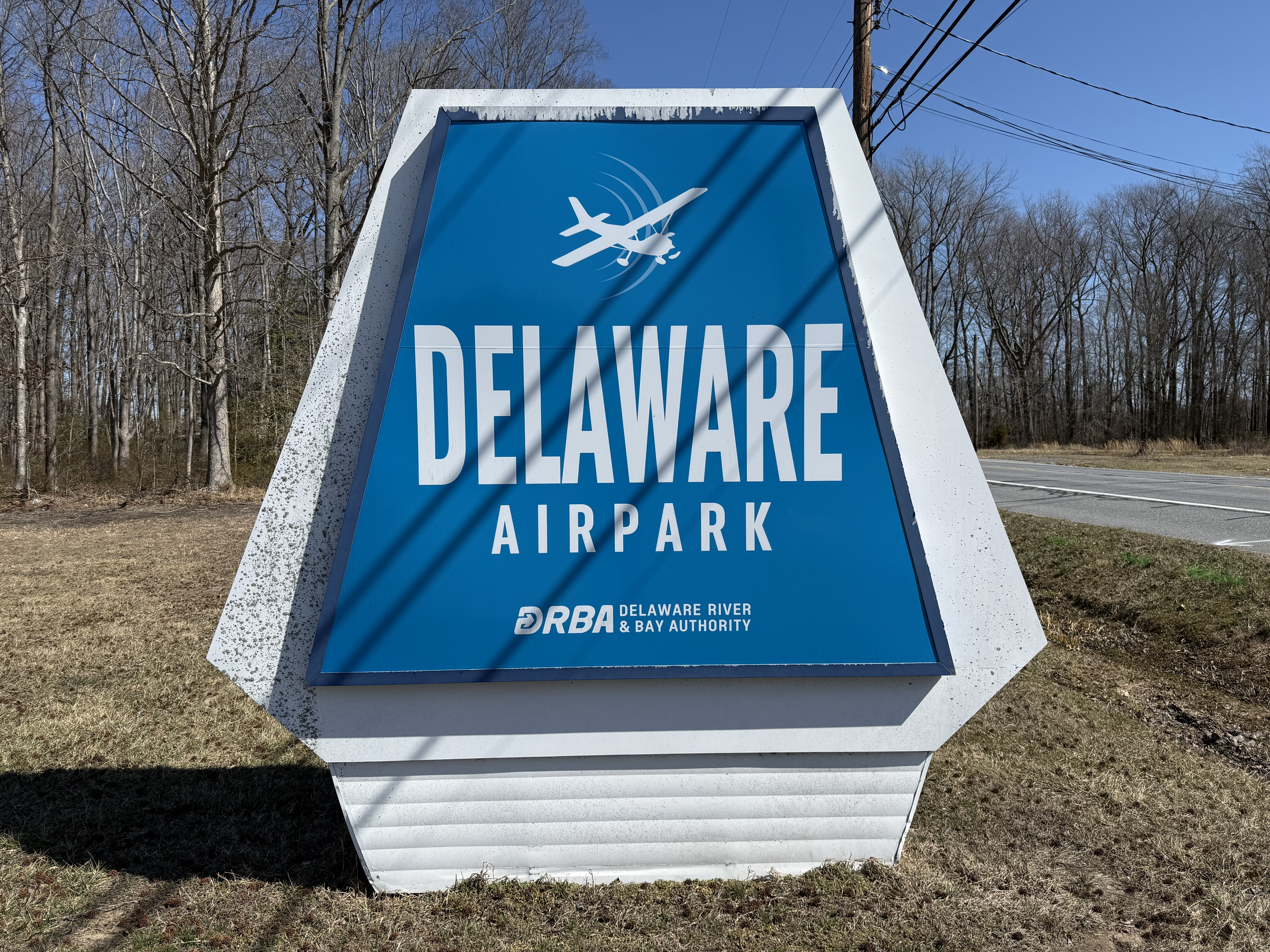

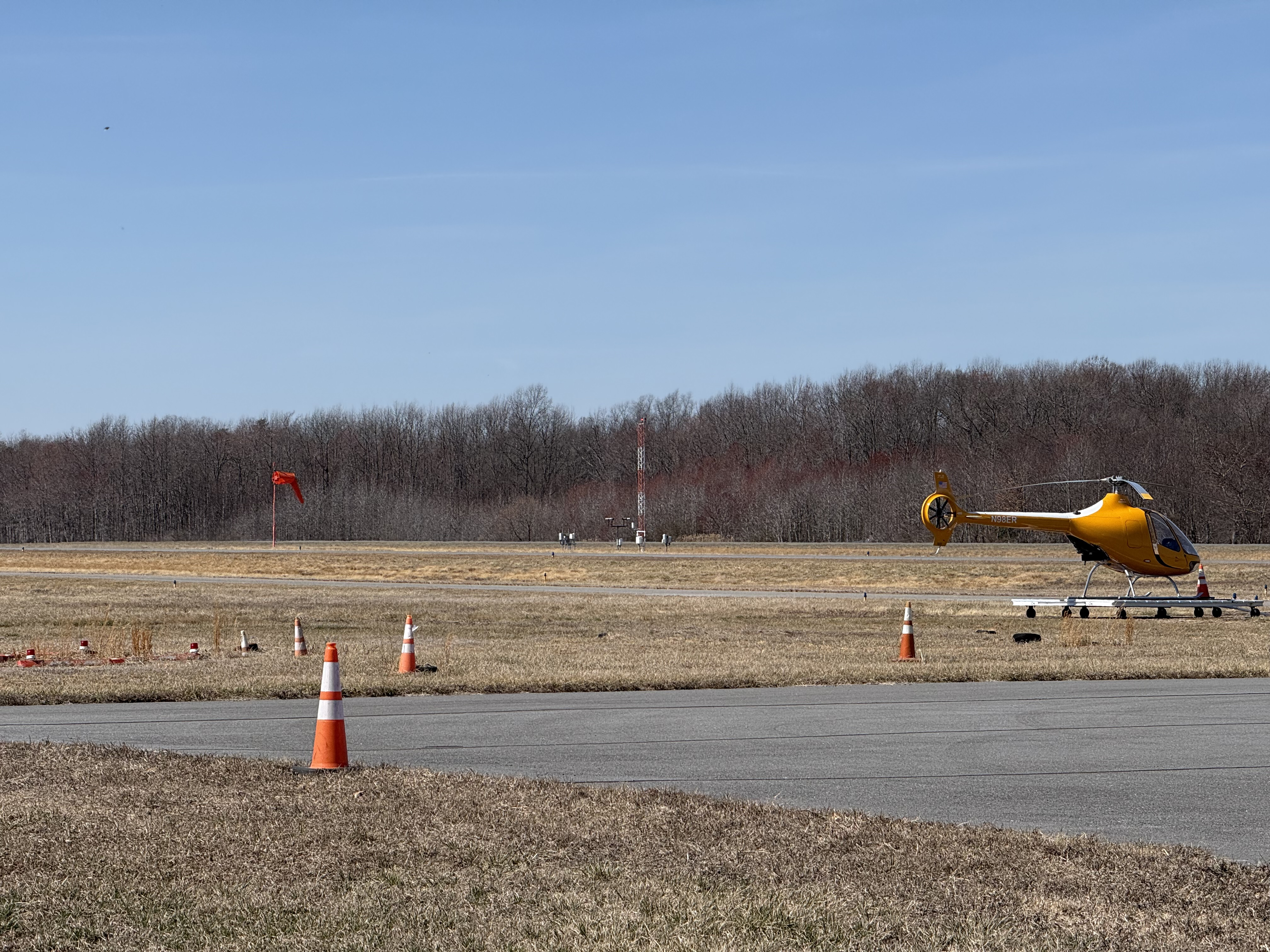
- The Automated Weather Observation System in the distance
- IATA: none; ICAO: none; FAA LID: 33N

Summary
- Airport type: Public
- Owner: Delaware Dept of Transportation
- Operator: Delaware River and Bay Authority
- Serves: Dover, Delaware
- Location: Kent County, Delaware, just west of Cheswold
- Time zone: UTC−05:00 (-5)
  - Summer (DST): UTC−04:00 (-4)
- Elevation AMSL: 55 ft (17 m)
- Coordinates: 39°13′06″N 075°35′48″W
- Website: www.DelawareAirpark.com

Map
- Interactive map of Delaware Airpark

Runways
Direction	Length		Surface
Direction	ft	m	Surface
9/27	4,201	1,280	Asphalt

Statistics (2020)
- Aircraft operations: 16,425
- Based aircraft: 48
- Source: Federal Aviation Administration

Delaware Airpark (FAA LID: 33N) is a public use airport in Kent County, Delaware, just west of the Cheswold corporate limits. The airport serves the Dover area, is owned by the Delaware Department of Transportation and is operated by the Delaware River and Bay Authority. It is included in the Federal Aviation Administration (FAA) National Plan of Integrated Airport Systems for 2017–2021, in which it is categorized as a local general aviation facility.

33N is home to Delaware State University's flight training program, providing its students with year-round flying capability. It is also used by NASCAR teams for Dover Motor Speedway events. Teams use Delaware Airpark because of its proximity to the track.

== History ==
In 2015, the airport received nearly $6 million to work towards a 13-stage project to bring the airport to proper FAA code. This included lengthening the runway, paving the entire taxiway system, and upgrading other facilities. The project was completed in 2017.

In 2020, the airport embarked on a 10-year mission to develop the airport further. This included updating the airport's master plan and potential for expanding and upgrading the airport's facilities further.

== Facilities and aircraft ==
Delaware Airpark covers an area of 319 acres (129 ha) at an elevation of 55 feet (17 m) above mean sea level. It has one runway designated 9/27 with an asphalt surface measuring 4,201 by 75 feet (1,092 x 18 m).

The airport has a fixed-base operator that sells avgas. It offers other services such as general maintenance, a conference room, a crew lounge, and more.

For the 12-month period ending December 1, 2020, the airport had 16,425 aircraft operations, an average of 45 per day. It was all general aviation. For the same time period, there were 48 aircraft based at the airport, all airplanes: 43 single-engine and 5 multi-engine

== Accidents and incidents ==
- On October 12, 2003, a Piper PA-28 Cherokee was substantially damaged while landing at the Delaware Airpark. The passenger reported that, on final approach, she noticed there was a tree above them, and she subsequently felt a bump. She then saw powerlines, noticed a bright flash, and did not remember anything further. The probable cause of the accident was found to be the pilot's failure to maintain a proper glide path to the runway, and his failure to maintain obstacle clearance which resulted in an in-flight collision with an unlit utility pole.
- On March 20, 2009, a Piper PA-28 Cherokee crashed after touchdown at the Delaware Airpark. The pilot had executed a go-around on his first attempt. On the second attempt, upon nearing touchdown, the aircraft began a turn to the left. It touched down 75 feet off the edge of the runway and continued to diverge from the runway. It struck two parked airplanes, at which point its right wing separated from the fuselage, and the aircraft came to rest. The probable cause of the accident was found to be the pilot's failure to maintain directional control during landing.

== See also ==
- List of airports in Delaware
