= Smyrna Airport (Delaware) =

- IATA: none; ICAO: none; FAA LID: 38N

Summary
- Airport type: Public
- Owner: Barbara Jones
- Serves: Smyrna, Delaware
- Time zone: UTC−05:00 (-5)
  - Summer (DST): UTC−04:00 (-4)
- Elevation AMSL: 18 ft / 5 m
- Coordinates: 39°18′13″N 075°35′02″W

Map
- Interactive map of Smyrna Airport

Runways
Direction	Length		Surface
Direction	ft	m	Surface
10/28	2,600	792	Turf

Statistics (2022)
- Aircraft operations: 3,080
- Source: Federal Aviation Administration

Smyrna Airport (FAA LID: 38N) is a public use airport located one nautical mile (2 km) east of the central business district of Smyrna, in Kent County, Delaware, United States. It is privately owned by Barbara Jones.

== Facilities and aircraft ==
Smyrna Airport covers an area of 20 acres (8.1 ha) at an elevation of 18 feet (5 m) above mean sea level. It has one runway: designated as Runway 10/28, it measures 2,600 x 125 ft (792 x 38 m) and has a turf surface.

For the 12-month period ending December 31, 2022, the airport had 3,080 aircraft operations, an average of 59 per week. It was entirely general aviation. For the same time period, 10 aircraft were based at the airport: 8 single-engine airplanes and 2 gliders.

The airport does not have a fixed-base operator, and no fuel is available.

== See also ==
- List of airports in Delaware
