= Delaware Coastal Airport =

Airport in Delaware, United States

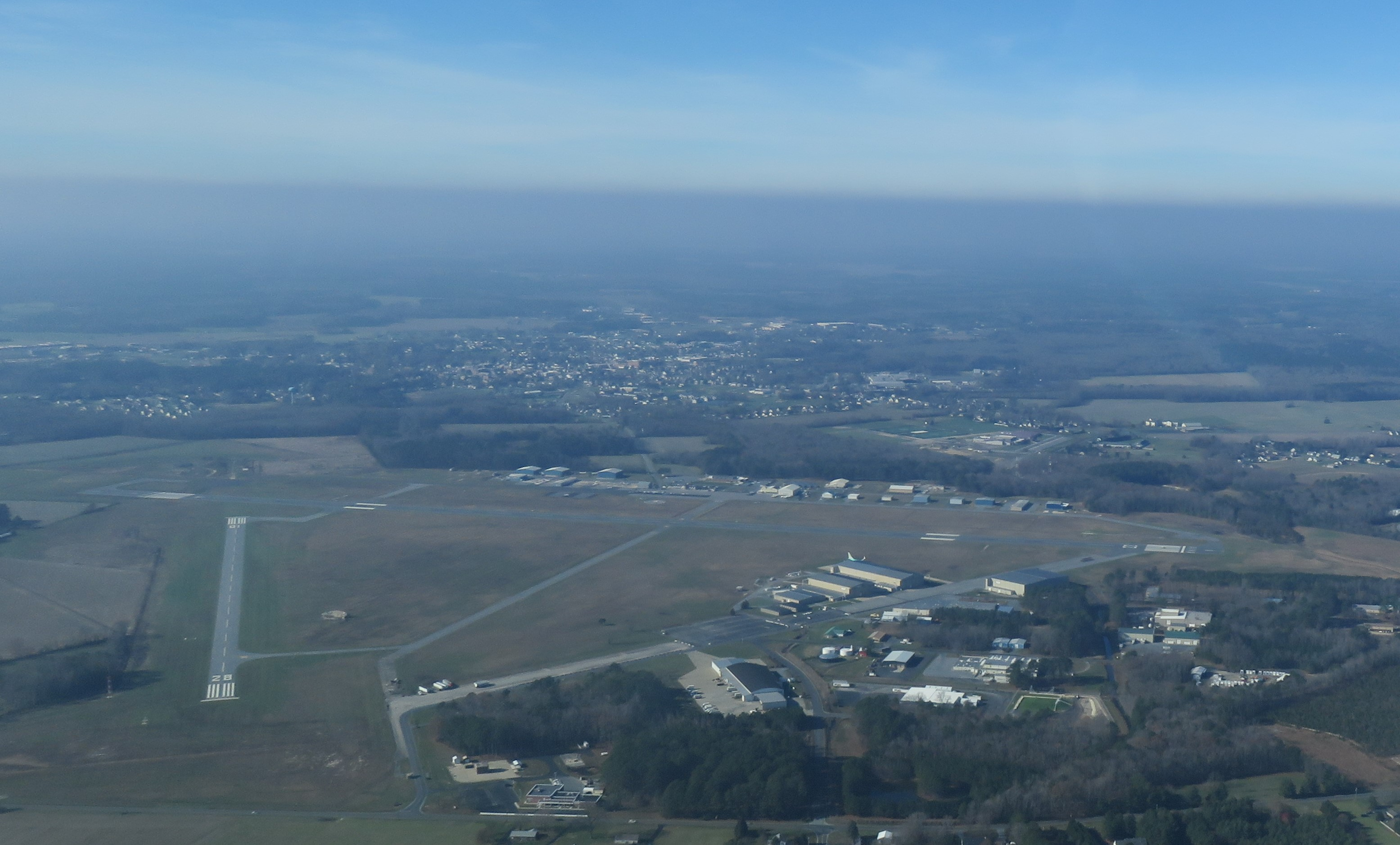
- IATA: GED; ICAO: KGED; FAA LID: GED

Summary
- Airport type: Public
- Owner: Sussex County Council
- Serves: Georgetown, Delaware
- Time zone: UTC−05:00 (-5)
  - Summer (DST): UTC−04:00 (-4)
- Elevation AMSL: 53 ft (16 m)
- Coordinates: 38°41′16″N 075°21′30″W
- Website: Delaware Coastal Airport

Map
- Interactive map of Delaware Coastal Airport

Runways
Direction	Length		Surface
Direction	ft	m	Surface
4/22	5,500	1,676	Asphalt
10/28	3,109	948	Asphalt

Statistics (2018)
- Aircraft operations: 34,310
- Based aircraft: 67
- Source: Federal Aviation Administration

Delaware Coastal Airport (IATA: GED, ICAO: KGED, FAA LID: GED) is a public use airport in unincorporated Sussex County, Delaware, United States. Owned by the Sussex County Council, it is located two nautical miles (4 km) southeast of the central business district of Georgetown. It is included in the Federal Aviation Administration (FAA) National Plan of Integrated Airport Systems for 2017–2021, in which it is categorized as a regional general aviation facility.

The airport is known locally by various unofficial names, including County Airport and, especially, Georgetown Airport. In mid-June 2015, the Sussex County Council voted to rename the airport from Sussex County Airport to Delaware Coastal Airport. The rebranding was part of a $40 million effort to modernize the facility and boost economic development.

The airport is home to the Delaware Aviation Museum, which features World War 2 aviation artifacts. The airport is also home to the Jeffrey Ethell Memorial Aviation Library, which houses more than 3,000 aviation-related books and is considered the largest aviation library on the U.S. east coast.

Though U.S. Customs and Border Protection does not operate a facility at the airport, they do accept international arrivals at the airport with prior notice.

== Facilities and aircraft ==
Delaware Coastal Airport covers an area of 615 acres (249 ha) at an elevation of 53 feet (16 m) above mean sea level. It has two runways with asphalt surfaces: 4/22 is 5,500 by 150 feet (1,676 x 46 m) and 10/28 is 3,109 by 75 feet (948 x 23 m).

For the 12-month period ending December 31, 2018, the airport had 34,310 aircraft operations, an average of 94 per day. It is 98% general aviation, 1% air taxi, and <0.4% military. At that time, there were 67 aircraft based at this airport: 48 single-engine and 8 multi-engine airplanes, 7 helicopters, and 4 jets.

In 2018, the airport received a $5.5 million federal grant to construct a taxiway parallel to the main runway and improve the approach systems for landing aircraft. In 2019, the airport received additional grants from the Federal Aviation Administration to help it continue to grow. Funds were used to extend the airport's runway and allow larger aircraft to use the airport.

In 2022, multiple new hangars were built at the airport to support more aircraft. New self-serve fuel facilities were also constructed. The new hangars' tenants, Schell Aviation, tore down old hangars to build the new facilities that could store aircraft and allow Schell to offer maintenance services to transient aircraft.

== Accidents and incidents ==
- On September 4, 2011, a North American TB-25N was substantially damaged during the landing rollout at Delaware Costal Airport. According to both pilots onboard, they landed the airplane and, during the landing rollout, they felt the right wing drop and heard a noise like "a blown tire." They attempted to maintain directional control of the airplane, but the airplane veered off of the right side of the runway. The airplane came to rest in the grass beside the runway; the pilots secured the airplane, and then exited without incident. The probable cause of the accident was found to be maintenance personnel's inadequate examination of the main landing gear during the airplane’s most recent conditional inspection, which resulted in the fatigue failure of the right main landing gear shock strut drag arm during the landing roll.
- On May 18, 2014, a Mooney M20 was substantially damaged when it collided with power lines and terrain following a total loss of engine power while on approach to Delaware Coastal Airport. As the pilot turned toward his final approach, the engine did not respond to attempts to increase power. Though the pilot thought he had enough altitude to land at the field, the airport came in too short and impacted power lines. The probable cause of the accident was found to be the pilot’s improper preflight planning and in-flight fuel management, which resulted in fuel starvation and a total loss of engine power.
- On July 11, 2016, a hoist system operator was fatally injured after falling from a Bell 429 helicopter operating at the airport. The aircraft was not damaged, and the pilot and two other crewmembers were not injured. The crew was completing recurrent rescue hoist training. The probable cause of the accident was found to be the emergency response team's failure to ensure that the system operator was secured to the helicopter, which resulted in his fall during the recurrent rescue hoist training operation.
- On January 28, 2017, a Piper PA-22 caught fire just after takeoff from Delaware Coastal Airport. Thick smoke started flowing from behind the instrument panel when the aircraft reached 1400 feet. The pilot attempted to return to the airport, but fire started entering the cabin from the floorboards, and the roof collapsed on approached. The aircraft came to rest in a grass area off the side of the runway. The pilot's descriptions of the fire were consistent with a liquid fuel-fed fire.

== See also ==
- List of airports in Delaware
