= Political party loyalty of United States counties =

In the United States, 15 counties or county equivalents have never voted for the Democratic presidential nominee in their history, while 5 have never voted for the Republican nominee. In recent decades, the number of electorally competitive counties has decreased, with most counties now consistently favoring one political party over the other.

== Records ==
Best result for the Democratic Party in each county and county equivalent in the United States from 1828 to 2024.

Best result for the Republican Party in each county and county equivalent in the United States from 1856 to 2024.

=== Highest party loyalty ===
Six counties or county equivalents have voted Republican for president in every election since they came into existence: Doniphan County, Kansas (since 1864); Leslie County, Kentucky (since 1880); Colonial Heights, Virginia (since 1952); Poquoson, Virginia (since 1976); Chugach Census Area, Alaska (since 2020); and Copper River Census Area, Alaska (since 2020). Nine other counties have never voted Democratic but have voted for a third-party candidate, specifically former Republican president Teddy Roosevelt in 1912. (Note: These are Ogle County, Illinois, Jackson County, Kentucky, McCreary County, Kentucky, Garrett County, Maryland, Missaukee County, Michigan, Avery County, North Carolina, Johnson County, Tennessee, Unicoi County, Tennessee, and Grant County, West Virginia.)

Twenty-five counties have voted Republican in every election since the end of the Civil War, however, they voted Democratic at least once prior to 1864. Most of these counties also supported Roosevelt in 1912. (Note: These are Lee County, Illinois, Edwards County, Illinois, Butler County, Kentucky, Clay County, Kentucky, Monroe County, Kentucky, Owsley County, Kentucky, Ottawa County, Michigan, Sanilac County, Michigan, Wilkes County, North Carolina, Morgan County, West Virginia, Union County, Pennsylvania, Snyder County, Pennsylvania, Blount County, Tennessee, Carter County, Tennessee, Cocke County, Tennessee, Grainger County, Tennessee, Hancock County, Tennessee, Jefferson County, Tennessee, Scott County, Tennessee, Sevier County, Tennessee, Washington County, Tennessee, Gasconade County, Missouri, Ozark County, Missouri, Putnam County, Missouri, and Taney County, Missouri.)

Five counties or county equivalents have always voted Democratic for president – Brooks County, Texas (since 1912); Jim Hogg County, Texas (since 1916); Menominee County, Wisconsin (since 1964); the District of Columbia (since 1964); and Kalawao County, Hawaii. (Note: Kalawao County elections are run by Maui County and it does not report results separately. While precinct-level data is available, the first year that residents of Kalawao County voted is unclear.)

=== Longest unbroken streak ===
Gasconade County, Missouri, holds the longest Republican voting streak, having voted for the Republican nominee in every presidential election since 1860.

The longest Democratic voting streak in presidential elections is held by Elliott County, Kentucky, which voted Democratic in every year from 1872 to 2012, though it voted Republican in 2016. The longest ongoing streak is currently held by Northampton County, North Carolina, which has voted Democratic in every election since 1900. Starr County, Texas, voted Democratic between 1896 and 2020, but flipped Republican in 2024.

== List ==
The following list shows the last time each county voted for the Democratic and Republican presidential nominee as of the 2024 election. Connecticut's historical counties listed were replaced as county equivalents in 2022 by planning regions. Alaska does not report results by borough or census area, and the boundaries of these often change, so estimates are shown based on current boundaries.

County	State	Last Democratic win	Last Republican win	Population (2020 census)
Autauga County	Alabama	1976	2024	58,805
Baldwin County	Alabama	1960	2024	231,767
Barbour County	Alabama	2012	2024	25,223
Bibb County	Alabama	1980	2024	22,293
Blount County	Alabama	1976	2024	59,134
Bullock County	Alabama	2024	1964	10,357
Butler County	Alabama	1996	2024	19,051
Calhoun County	Alabama	1976	2024	116,441
Chambers County	Alabama	1996	2024	34,772
Cherokee County	Alabama	1996	2024	24,971
Chilton County	Alabama	1976	2024	45,014
Choctaw County	Alabama	2000	2024	12,665
Clarke County	Alabama	1996	2024	23,087
Clay County	Alabama	1980	2024	14,236
Cleburne County	Alabama	1976	2024	15,056
Coffee County	Alabama	1976	2024	53,465
Colbert County	Alabama	2000	2024	57,227
Conecuh County	Alabama	2012	2024	11,597
Coosa County	Alabama	1996	2024	10,387
Covington County	Alabama	1976	2024	37,570
Crenshaw County	Alabama	1996	2024	13,194
Cullman County	Alabama	1980	2024	87,866
Dale County	Alabama	1976	2024	49,326
Dallas County	Alabama	2024	1972	38,462
DeKalb County	Alabama	1976	2024	71,608
Elmore County	Alabama	1976	2024	87,977
Escambia County	Alabama	1976	2024	36,757
Etowah County	Alabama	1996	2024	103,436
Fayette County	Alabama	1996	2024	16,321
Franklin County	Alabama	1996	2024	32,113
Geneva County	Alabama	1976	2024	26,659
Greene County	Alabama	2024	1964	7,730
Hale County	Alabama	2024	1972	14,785
Henry County	Alabama	1980	2024	17,146
Houston County	Alabama	1956	2024	107,202
Jackson County	Alabama	2000	2024	52,579
Jefferson County	Alabama	2024	2004	674,721
Lamar County	Alabama	1980	2024	13,972
Lauderdale County	Alabama	1992	2024	93,564
Lawrence County	Alabama	2000	2024	33,073
Lee County	Alabama	1960	2024	174,241
Limestone County	Alabama	1980	2024	103,570
Lowndes County	Alabama	2024	1964	10,311
Macon County	Alabama	2024	1956	19,532
Madison County	Alabama	1976	2024	388,153
Marengo County	Alabama	2020	2024	19,323
Marion County	Alabama	1996	2024	29,341
Marshall County	Alabama	1980	2024	97,612
Mobile County	Alabama	1960	2024	414,809
Monroe County	Alabama	1976	2024	19,772
Montgomery County	Alabama	2024	1992	228,954
Morgan County	Alabama	1980	2024	123,421
Perry County	Alabama	2024	1972	8,511
Pickens County	Alabama	1996	2024	19,123
Pike County	Alabama	1976	2024	33,009
Randolph County	Alabama	1980	2024	21,967
Russell County	Alabama	2024	1972	59,183
Shelby County	Alabama	1960	2024	223,024
St. Clair County	Alabama	1976	2024	91,103
Sumter County	Alabama	2024	1964	12,345
Talladega County	Alabama	1980	2024	82,149
Tallapoosa County	Alabama	1980	2024	41,311
Tuscaloosa County	Alabama	1976	2024	227,036
Walker County	Alabama	1996	2024	65,342
Washington County	Alabama	1996	2024	15,388
Wilcox County	Alabama	2024	1964	10,600
Winston County	Alabama	1976	2024	23,540
Aleutians East Borough	Alaska	1964	2024	3,420
Aleutians West Census Area	Alaska	2024	2008	5,232
Anchorage	Alaska	2024	2016	291,247
Bethel Census Area	Alaska	2024	2004	18,666
Bristol Bay Borough	Alaska	1964	2024	844
Chugach Census Area	Alaska	Never	2024	7,102
Copper River Census Area	Alaska	Never	2024	2,617
Denali Borough	Alaska	1964	2024	1,619
Dillingham Census Area	Alaska	2020	2024	4,857
Fairbanks North Star Borough	Alaska	1964	2024	95,655
Haines Borough	Alaska	2024	2012	2,080
Hoonah–Angoon Census Area	Alaska	2024	2000	2,365
Juneau	Alaska	2024	2000	32,255
Kenai Peninsula Borough	Alaska	1968	2024	58,799
Ketchikan Gateway Borough	Alaska	1964	2024	13,948
Kodiak Island Borough	Alaska	1964	2024	13,101
Kusilvak Census Area	Alaska	2024	2004	8,368
Lake and Peninsula Borough	Alaska	2020	2024	1,476
Matanuska-Susitna Borough	Alaska	1964	2024	107,081
Nome Census Area	Alaska	2024	2004	10,046
North Slope Borough	Alaska	2016	2024	11,031
Northwest Arctic Borough	Alaska	2020	2024	7,793
Petersburg Borough	Alaska	1968	2024	3,398
Prince of Wales – Hyder Census Area	Alaska	2020	2024	5,753
Sitka	Alaska	2024	2000	8,458
Skagway	Alaska	2024	2000	1,240
Southeast Fairbanks Census Area	Alaska	1964	2024	6,808
Wrangell	Alaska	1964	2024	2,127
Yakutat	Alaska	2024	2004	662
Yukon–Koyukuk Census Area	Alaska	2024	2008	5,343
Apache County	Arizona	2024	1980	66,021
Cochise County	Arizona	1992	2024	125,447
Coconino County	Arizona	2024	1988	145,101
Gila County	Arizona	1996	2024	53,272
Graham County	Arizona	1964	2024	38,533
Greenlee County	Arizona	1996	2024	9,563
La Paz County	Arizona	1996	2024	16,557
Maricopa County	Arizona	2020	2024	4,420,568
Mohave County	Arizona	1964	2024	213,267
Navajo County	Arizona	1996	2024	106,717
Pima County	Arizona	2024	1988	1,043,433
Pinal County	Arizona	1996	2024	425,264
Santa Cruz County	Arizona	2024	1988	47,669
Yavapai County	Arizona	1948	2024	236,209
Yuma County	Arizona	1964	2024	203,881
Arkansas County	Arkansas	1996	2024	17,149
Ashley County	Arkansas	2000	2024	19,062
Baxter County	Arkansas	1992	2024	41,627
Benton County	Arkansas	1948	2024	284,333
Boone County	Arkansas	1992	2024	37,373
Bradley County	Arkansas	2004	2024	10,545
Calhoun County	Arkansas	1996	2024	4,739
Carroll County	Arkansas	1992	2024	28,260
Chicot County	Arkansas	2024	1972	10,208
Clark County	Arkansas	2004	2024	21,446
Clay County	Arkansas	2004	2024	14,552
Cleburne County	Arkansas	1996	2024	24,711
Cleveland County	Arkansas	1996	2024	7,550
Columbia County	Arkansas	1996	2024	22,801
Conway County	Arkansas	1996	2024	20,715
Craighead County	Arkansas	2000	2024	111,231
Crawford County	Arkansas	1976	2024	60,133
Crittenden County	Arkansas	2024	1988	48,163
Cross County	Arkansas	2000	2024	16,833
Dallas County	Arkansas	2000	2024	6,482
Desha County	Arkansas	2020	2024	11,395
Drew County	Arkansas	2000	2024	17,350
Faulkner County	Arkansas	1996	2024	123,498
Franklin County	Arkansas	1996	2024	17,097
Fulton County	Arkansas	1996	2024	12,075
Garland County	Arkansas	1996	2024	100,180
Grant County	Arkansas	1996	2024	17,958
Greene County	Arkansas	2000	2024	45,736
Hempstead County	Arkansas	2004	2024	20,065
Hot Spring County	Arkansas	2000	2024	33,040
Howard County	Arkansas	1996	2024	12,785
Independence County	Arkansas	1996	2024	37,938
Izard County	Arkansas	2000	2024	13,577
Jackson County	Arkansas	2004	2024	16,755
Jefferson County	Arkansas	2024	1972	67,260
Johnson County	Arkansas	1996	2024	25,749
Lafayette County	Arkansas	2000	2024	6,308
Lawrence County	Arkansas	2004	2024	16,216
Lee County	Arkansas	2024	1972	8,600
Lincoln County	Arkansas	2004	2024	12,941
Little River County	Arkansas	2004	2024	12,026
Logan County	Arkansas	1996	2024	21,131
Lonoke County	Arkansas	1996	2024	74,015
Madison County	Arkansas	1996	2024	16,521
Marion County	Arkansas	1996	2024	16,826
Miller County	Arkansas	1996	2024	42,600
Mississippi County	Arkansas	2004	2024	40,685
Monroe County	Arkansas	2004	2024	6,799
Montgomery County	Arkansas	1996	2024	8,484
Nevada County	Arkansas	2000	2024	8,310
Newton County	Arkansas	1992	2024	7,225
Ouachita County	Arkansas	2000	2024	22,650
Perry County	Arkansas	1996	2024	10,019
Phillips County	Arkansas	2024	1972	16,568
Pike County	Arkansas	1996	2024	10,171
Poinsett County	Arkansas	2004	2024	22,965
Polk County	Arkansas	1992	2024	19,221
Pope County	Arkansas	1996	2024	63,381
Prairie County	Arkansas	1996	2024	8,282
Pulaski County	Arkansas	2024	1988	399,125
Randolph County	Arkansas	2004	2024	18,571
Saline County	Arkansas	1996	2024	123,416
Scott County	Arkansas	1996	2024	9,836
Searcy County	Arkansas	1976	2024	7,828
Sebastian County	Arkansas	1948	2024	127,799
Sevier County	Arkansas	1996	2024	15,839
Sharp County	Arkansas	1996	2024	17,271
St. Francis County	Arkansas	2024	1984	23,090
Stone County	Arkansas	1996	2024	12,359
Union County	Arkansas	1996	2024	39,054
Van Buren County	Arkansas	1996	2024	15,796
Washington County	Arkansas	1996	2024	245,871
White County	Arkansas	1996	2024	76,822
Woodruff County	Arkansas	2012	2024	6,269
Yell County	Arkansas	1996	2024	20,263
Alameda County	California	2024	1956	1,682,353
Alpine County	California	2024	2000	1,204
Amador County	California	1976	2024	40,474
Butte County	California	2020	2024	211,632
Calaveras County	California	1964	2024	45,292
Colusa County	California	1964	2024	21,839
Contra Costa County	California	2024	1984	1,165,927
Del Norte County	California	1992	2024	27,743
El Dorado County	California	1976	2024	191,185
Fresno County	California	2020	2024	1,008,654
Glenn County	California	1964	2024	28,917
Humboldt County	California	2024	1984	136,463
Imperial County	California	2020	2024	179,702
Inyo County	California	2020	2024	19,016
Kern County	California	1964	2024	909,235
Kings County	California	1968	2024	152,486
Lake County	California	2020	2024	68,163
Lassen County	California	1976	2024	32,730
Los Angeles County	California	2024	1984	10,014,009
Madera County	California	1976	2024	156,255
Marin County	California	2024	1980	262,321
Mariposa County	California	1992	2024	17,131
Mendocino County	California	2024	1984	91,601
Merced County	California	2020	2024	281,202
Modoc County	California	1964	2024	8,700
Mono County	California	2024	2000	13,195
Monterey County	California	2024	1988	439,035
Napa County	California	2024	1988	138,019
Nevada County	California	2024	2012	102,241
Orange County	California	2024	2012	3,186,989
Placer County	California	1976	2024	404,739
Plumas County	California	1992	2024	19,790
Riverside County	California	2020	2024	2,418,185
Sacramento County	California	2024	1988	1,585,055
San Benito County	California	2024	1988	64,209
San Bernardino County	California	2020	2024	2,181,654
San Diego County	California	2024	2004	3,298,634
San Francisco	California	2024	1956	873,965
San Joaquin County	California	2020	2024	779,233
San Luis Obispo County	California	2024	2004	282,424
San Mateo County	California	2024	1984	764,442
Santa Barbara County	California	2024	1988	448,229
Santa Clara County	California	2024	1984	1,936,259
Santa Cruz County	California	2024	1980	270,861
Shasta County	California	1976	2024	182,155
Sierra County	California	1976	2024	3,236
Siskiyou County	California	1992	2024	44,076
Solano County	California	2024	1984	453,491
Sonoma County	California	2024	1984	488,863
Stanislaus County	California	2020	2024	552,878
Sutter County	California	1940	2024	99,633
Tehama County	California	1992	2024	65,829
Trinity County	California	2008	2024	16,112
Tulare County	California	1964	2024	473,117
Tuolumne County	California	1992	2024	55,620
Ventura County	California	2024	2004	843,843
Yolo County	California	2024	1952	216,403
Yuba County	California	1976	2024	81,575
Adams County	Colorado	2024	1984	519,572
Alamosa County	Colorado	2016	2024	16,376
Arapahoe County	Colorado	2024	2004	655,070
Archuleta County	Colorado	1964	2024	13,359
Baca County	Colorado	1964	2024	3,506
Bent County	Colorado	1996	2024	5,650
Boulder County	Colorado	2024	1984	330,758
Broomfield	Colorado	2024	2004	74,112
Chaffee County	Colorado	2024	2016	19,476
Cheyenne County	Colorado	1976	2024	1,748
Clear Creek County	Colorado	2024	2000	9,397
Conejos County	Colorado	2012	2024	7,461
Costilla County	Colorado	2024	1924	3,499
Crowley County	Colorado	1964	2024	5,922
Custer County	Colorado	1964	2024	4,704
Delta County	Colorado	1964	2024	31,196
Denver	Colorado	2024	1980	715,522
Dolores County	Colorado	1976	2024	2,326
Douglas County	Colorado	1964	2024	357,978
Eagle County	Colorado	2024	2000	55,731
El Paso County	Colorado	1964	2024	730,395
Elbert County	Colorado	1932	2024	26,062
Fremont County	Colorado	1964	2024	48,939
Garfield County	Colorado	2024	2016	61,685
Gilpin County	Colorado	2024	1984	5,808
Grand County	Colorado	2008	2024	15,717
Gunnison County	Colorado	2024	2000	16,918
Hinsdale County	Colorado	1936	2024	788
Huerfano County	Colorado	2012	2024	6,820
Jackson County	Colorado	1964	2024	1,379
Jefferson County	Colorado	2024	2004	582,910
Kiowa County	Colorado	1964	2024	1,446
Kit Carson County	Colorado	1964	2024	7,087
La Plata County	Colorado	2024	2000	55,638
Lake County	Colorado	2024	1984	7,436
Larimer County	Colorado	2024	2004	359,066
Las Animas County	Colorado	2012	2024	14,555
Lincoln County	Colorado	1964	2024	5,675
Logan County	Colorado	1964	2024	21,528
Mesa County	Colorado	1992	2024	155,703
Mineral County	Colorado	1996	2024	865
Moffat County	Colorado	1964	2024	13,292
Montezuma County	Colorado	1964	2024	25,849
Montrose County	Colorado	1964	2024	42,679
Morgan County	Colorado	1964	2024	29,111
Otero County	Colorado	1996	2024	18,690
Ouray County	Colorado	2024	2004	4,874
Park County	Colorado	1964	2024	17,390
Phillips County	Colorado	1976	2024	4,530
Pitkin County	Colorado	2024	1984	17,358
Prowers County	Colorado	1976	2024	11,999
Pueblo County	Colorado	2020	2024	168,162
Rio Blanco County	Colorado	1964	2024	6,529
Rio Grande County	Colorado	1964	2024	11,539
Routt County	Colorado	2024	2000	24,829
Saguache County	Colorado	2024	1984	6,368
San Juan County	Colorado	2024	2000	705
San Miguel County	Colorado	2024	1984	8,072
Sedgwick County	Colorado	1964	2024	2,404
Summit County	Colorado	2024	1988	31,055
Teller County	Colorado	1964	2024	24,710
Washington County	Colorado	1936	2024	4,817
Weld County	Colorado	1964	2024	328,981
Yuma County	Colorado	1964	2024	9,988
Fairfield County	Connecticut	2024	1992	957,419
Hartford County	Connecticut	2024	1984	899,498
Litchfield County	Connecticut	2008	2024	185,186
Middlesex County	Connecticut	2024	1988	164,245
New Haven County	Connecticut	2024	1988	864,835
New London County	Connecticut	2024	1988	268,555
Tolland County	Connecticut	2024	1988	149,788
Windham County	Connecticut	2012	2024	116,418
Kent County	Delaware	2024	2016	181,851
New Castle County	Delaware	2024	1988	570,719
Sussex County	Delaware	1996	2024	237,378
District of Columbia	District of Columbia	2024	Never	689,545
Alachua County	Florida	2024	1988	278,468
Baker County	Florida	1980	2024	28,259
Bay County	Florida	1976	2024	175,216
Bradford County	Florida	1980	2024	28,303
Brevard County	Florida	1976	2024	606,612
Broward County	Florida	2024	1988	1,944,375
Calhoun County	Florida	1996	2024	13,648
Charlotte County	Florida	1964	2024	186,847
Citrus County	Florida	1996	2024	153,843
Clay County	Florida	1960	2024	218,245
Collier County	Florida	1952	2024	375,752
Columbia County	Florida	1980	2024	69,698
DeSoto County	Florida	1976	2024	33,976
Dixie County	Florida	1996	2024	16,759
Duval County	Florida	2020	2024	995,567
Escambia County	Florida	1960	2024	321,905
Flagler County	Florida	2008	2024	115,378
Franklin County	Florida	1996	2024	12,451
Gadsden County	Florida	2024	1972	43,826
Gilchrist County	Florida	1996	2024	17,864
Glades County	Florida	1996	2024	12,126
Gulf County	Florida	1996	2024	14,192
Hamilton County	Florida	1996	2024	14,004
Hardee County	Florida	1976	2024	25,327
Hendry County	Florida	1996	2024	39,619
Hernando County	Florida	2000	2024	194,515
Highlands County	Florida	1948	2024	101,235
Hillsborough County	Florida	2020	2024	1,459,762
Holmes County	Florida	1976	2024	19,653
Indian River County	Florida	1944	2024	159,788
Jackson County	Florida	1980	2024	47,319
Jefferson County	Florida	2012	2024	14,510
Lafayette County	Florida	1980	2024	8,226
Lake County	Florida	1944	2024	383,956
Lee County	Florida	1944	2024	760,822
Leon County	Florida	2024	1988	292,198
Levy County	Florida	1996	2024	42,915
Liberty County	Florida	1980	2024	7,974
Madison County	Florida	1996	2024	17,968
Manatee County	Florida	1944	2024	399,710
Marion County	Florida	1976	2024	375,908
Martin County	Florida	1944	2024	158,431
Miami-Dade County	Florida	2020	2024	2,701,767
Monroe County	Florida	2012	2024	82,874
Nassau County	Florida	1976	2024	90,352
Okaloosa County	Florida	1960	2024	211,668
Okeechobee County	Florida	1996	2024	39,644
Orange County	Florida	2024	1996	1,429,908
Osceola County	Florida	2020	2024	388,656
Palm Beach County	Florida	2024	1988	1,492,191
Pasco County	Florida	2000	2024	561,891
Pinellas County	Florida	2020	2024	959,107
Polk County	Florida	1976	2024	725,046
Putnam County	Florida	1996	2024	73,321
Santa Rosa County	Florida	1960	2024	188,000
Sarasota County	Florida	1944	2024	434,006
Seminole County	Florida	2020	2024	470,856
St. Johns County	Florida	1976	2024	273,425
St. Lucie County	Florida	2012	2024	329,226
Sumter County	Florida	1996	2024	129,752
Suwannee County	Florida	1980	2024	43,474
Taylor County	Florida	1996	2024	21,796
Union County	Florida	1980	2024	16,147
Volusia County	Florida	2008	2024	553,543
Wakulla County	Florida	1996	2024	33,764
Walton County	Florida	1976	2024	75,305
Washington County	Florida	1976	2024	25,318
Appling County	(Georgia (U.S. state)) Georgia	1980	2024	18,444
Atkinson County	(Georgia (U.S. state)) Georgia	1996	2024	8,286
Bacon County	(Georgia (U.S. state)) Georgia	1992	2024	11,140
Baker County	(Georgia (U.S. state)) Georgia	2012	2024	2,876
Baldwin County	(Georgia (U.S. state)) Georgia	2020	2024	43,799
Banks County	(Georgia (U.S. state)) Georgia	1980	2024	18,035
Barrow County	(Georgia (U.S. state)) Georgia	1980	2024	83,505
Bartow County	(Georgia (U.S. state)) Georgia	1980	2024	108,901
Ben Hill County	(Georgia (U.S. state)) Georgia	1996	2024	17,194
Berrien County	(Georgia (U.S. state)) Georgia	1996	2024	18,160
Bibb County	(Georgia (U.S. state)) Georgia	2024	1988	157,346
Bleckley County	(Georgia (U.S. state)) Georgia	1992	2024	12,583
Brantley County	(Georgia (U.S. state)) Georgia	1992	2024	18,021
Brooks County	(Georgia (U.S. state)) Georgia	1996	2024	16,301
Bryan County	(Georgia (U.S. state)) Georgia	1980	2024	44,738
Bulloch County	(Georgia (U.S. state)) Georgia	1980	2024	81,099
Burke County	(Georgia (U.S. state)) Georgia	2016	2024	24,596
Butts County	(Georgia (U.S. state)) Georgia	1996	2024	25,434
Calhoun County	(Georgia (U.S. state)) Georgia	2024	1972	5,573
Camden County	(Georgia (U.S. state)) Georgia	1980	2024	54,768
Candler County	(Georgia (U.S. state)) Georgia	1992	2024	10,981
Carroll County	(Georgia (U.S. state)) Georgia	1980	2024	119,148
Catoosa County	(Georgia (U.S. state)) Georgia	1976	2024	67,872
Charlton County	(Georgia (U.S. state)) Georgia	1980	2024	12,518
Chatham County	(Georgia (U.S. state)) Georgia	2024	2000	295,291
Chattahoochee County	(Georgia (U.S. state)) Georgia	2008	2024	9,565
Chattooga County	(Georgia (U.S. state)) Georgia	1996	2024	24,965
Cherokee County	(Georgia (U.S. state)) Georgia	1980	2024	266,620
Clarke County	(Georgia (U.S. state)) Georgia	2024	1984	128,671
Clay County	(Georgia (U.S. state)) Georgia	2024	1972	2,848
Clayton County	(Georgia (U.S. state)) Georgia	2024	1988	297,595
Clinch County	(Georgia (U.S. state)) Georgia	1996	2024	6,749
Cobb County	(Georgia (U.S. state)) Georgia	2024	2012	766,149
Coffee County	(Georgia (U.S. state)) Georgia	1980	2024	43,092
Colquitt County	(Georgia (U.S. state)) Georgia	1980	2024	45,898
Columbia County	(Georgia (U.S. state)) Georgia	1976	2024	156,010
Cook County	(Georgia (U.S. state)) Georgia	1996	2024	17,229
Coweta County	(Georgia (U.S. state)) Georgia	1980	2024	146,158
Crawford County	(Georgia (U.S. state)) Georgia	1996	2024	12,130
Crisp County	(Georgia (U.S. state)) Georgia	1996	2024	20,128
Dade County	(Georgia (U.S. state)) Georgia	1976	2024	16,251
Dawson County	(Georgia (U.S. state)) Georgia	1980	2024	26,798
Decatur County	(Georgia (U.S. state)) Georgia	1996	2024	29,367
DeKalb County	(Georgia (U.S. state)) Georgia	2024	1984	764,382
Dodge County	(Georgia (U.S. state)) Georgia	1996	2024	19,925
Dooly County	(Georgia (U.S. state)) Georgia	2012	2024	11,208
Dougherty County	(Georgia (U.S. state)) Georgia	2024	1988	85,790
Douglas County	(Georgia (U.S. state)) Georgia	2024	2004	144,237
Early County	(Georgia (U.S. state)) Georgia	2012	2024	10,854
Echols County	(Georgia (U.S. state)) Georgia	1980	2024	3,697
Effingham County	(Georgia (U.S. state)) Georgia	1980	2024	64,769
Elbert County	(Georgia (U.S. state)) Georgia	1996	2024	19,637
Emanuel County	(Georgia (U.S. state)) Georgia	1996	2024	22,768
Evans County	(Georgia (U.S. state)) Georgia	1980	2024	10,774
Fannin County	(Georgia (U.S. state)) Georgia	1976	2024	25,319
Fayette County	(Georgia (U.S. state)) Georgia	1976	2024	119,194
Floyd County	(Georgia (U.S. state)) Georgia	1980	2024	98,584
Forsyth County	(Georgia (U.S. state)) Georgia	1980	2024	251,283
Franklin County	(Georgia (U.S. state)) Georgia	1992	2024	23,424
Fulton County	(Georgia (U.S. state)) Georgia	2024	1972	1,066,710
Gilmer County	(Georgia (U.S. state)) Georgia	1980	2024	31,353
Glascock County	(Georgia (U.S. state)) Georgia	1980	2024	2,884
Glynn County	(Georgia (U.S. state)) Georgia	1980	2024	84,499
Gordon County	(Georgia (U.S. state)) Georgia	1980	2024	57,544
Grady County	(Georgia (U.S. state)) Georgia	1996	2024	26,236
Greene County	(Georgia (U.S. state)) Georgia	1996	2024	18,915
Gwinnett County	(Georgia (U.S. state)) Georgia	2024	2012	957,062
Habersham County	(Georgia (U.S. state)) Georgia	1980	2024	46,031
Hall County	(Georgia (U.S. state)) Georgia	1980	2024	203,136
Hancock County	(Georgia (U.S. state)) Georgia	2024	1972	8,735
Haralson County	(Georgia (U.S. state)) Georgia	1992	2024	29,919
Harris County	(Georgia (U.S. state)) Georgia	1980	2024	34,668
Hart County	(Georgia (U.S. state)) Georgia	1996	2024	25,828
Heard County	(Georgia (U.S. state)) Georgia	1996	2024	11,412
Henry County	(Georgia (U.S. state)) Georgia	2024	2012	240,712
Houston County	(Georgia (U.S. state)) Georgia	1980	2024	163,633
Irwin County	(Georgia (U.S. state)) Georgia	1996	2024	9,666
Jackson County	(Georgia (U.S. state)) Georgia	1980	2024	75,907
Jasper County	(Georgia (U.S. state)) Georgia	1996	2024	14,588
Jeff Davis County	(Georgia (U.S. state)) Georgia	1992	2024	14,779
Jefferson County	(Georgia (U.S. state)) Georgia	2020	2024	15,709
Jenkins County	(Georgia (U.S. state)) Georgia	1996	2024	8,674
Johnson County	(Georgia (U.S. state)) Georgia	1996	2024	9,189
Jones County	(Georgia (U.S. state)) Georgia	1992	2024	28,347
Lamar County	(Georgia (U.S. state)) Georgia	1996	2024	18,500
Lanier County	(Georgia (U.S. state)) Georgia	1996	2024	9,877
Laurens County	(Georgia (U.S. state)) Georgia	1992	2024	49,570
Lee County	(Georgia (U.S. state)) Georgia	1976	2024	33,163
Liberty County	(Georgia (U.S. state)) Georgia	2024	1988	65,256
Lincoln County	(Georgia (U.S. state)) Georgia	1992	2024	7,690
Long County	(Georgia (U.S. state)) Georgia	1996	2024	16,168
Lowndes County	(Georgia (U.S. state)) Georgia	1976	2024	118,251
Lumpkin County	(Georgia (U.S. state)) Georgia	1992	2024	33,488
Macon County	(Georgia (U.S. state)) Georgia	2024	1972	12,082
Madison County	(Georgia (U.S. state)) Georgia	1980	2024	30,120
Marion County	(Georgia (U.S. state)) Georgia	1996	2024	7,498
McDuffie County	(Georgia (U.S. state)) Georgia	1980	2024	21,632
McIntosh County	(Georgia (U.S. state)) Georgia	2000	2024	10,975
Meriwether County	(Georgia (U.S. state)) Georgia	2000	2024	20,613
Miller County	(Georgia (U.S. state)) Georgia	1996	2024	6,000
Mitchell County	(Georgia (U.S. state)) Georgia	2000	2024	21,755
Monroe County	(Georgia (U.S. state)) Georgia	1992	2024	27,957
Montgomery County	(Georgia (U.S. state)) Georgia	1996	2024	8,610
Morgan County	(Georgia (U.S. state)) Georgia	1992	2024	20,097
Murray County	(Georgia (U.S. state)) Georgia	1980	2024	39,973
Muscogee County	(Georgia (U.S. state)) Georgia	2024	1988	206,922
Newton County	(Georgia (U.S. state)) Georgia	2024	2004	112,483
Oconee County	(Georgia (U.S. state)) Georgia	1980	2024	41,799
Oglethorpe County	(Georgia (U.S. state)) Georgia	1980	2024	14,825
Paulding County	(Georgia (U.S. state)) Georgia	1980	2024	168,661
Peach County	(Georgia (U.S. state)) Georgia	2012	2024	27,981
Pickens County	(Georgia (U.S. state)) Georgia	1992	2024	33,216
Pierce County	(Georgia (U.S. state)) Georgia	1980	2024	19,716
Pike County	(Georgia (U.S. state)) Georgia	1980	2024	18,889
Polk County	(Georgia (U.S. state)) Georgia	1996	2024	42,853
Pulaski County	(Georgia (U.S. state)) Georgia	1996	2024	9,855
Putnam County	(Georgia (U.S. state)) Georgia	1996	2024	22,047
Quitman County	(Georgia (U.S. state)) Georgia	2012	2024	2,235
Rabun County	(Georgia (U.S. state)) Georgia	1980	2024	16,883
Randolph County	(Georgia (U.S. state)) Georgia	2024	1984	6,425
Richmond County	(Georgia (U.S. state)) Georgia	2024	1988	206,607
Rockdale County	(Georgia (U.S. state)) Georgia	2024	2004	93,570
Schley County	(Georgia (U.S. state)) Georgia	1996	2024	4,547
Screven County	(Georgia (U.S. state)) Georgia	1996	2024	14,067
Seminole County	(Georgia (U.S. state)) Georgia	1996	2024	9,147
Spalding County	(Georgia (U.S. state)) Georgia	1980	2024	67,306
Stephens County	(Georgia (U.S. state)) Georgia	1980	2024	26,784
Stewart County	(Georgia (U.S. state)) Georgia	2024	1972	5,314
Sumter County	(Georgia (U.S. state)) Georgia	2024	2004	29,616
Talbot County	(Georgia (U.S. state)) Georgia	2024	1972	5,733
Taliaferro County	(Georgia (U.S. state)) Georgia	2024	1972	1,559
Tattnall County	(Georgia (U.S. state)) Georgia	1980	2024	22,842
Taylor County	(Georgia (U.S. state)) Georgia	1996	2024	7,816
Telfair County	(Georgia (U.S. state)) Georgia	2000	2024	12,477
Terrell County	(Georgia (U.S. state)) Georgia	2024	1988	9,185
Thomas County	(Georgia (U.S. state)) Georgia	1980	2024	45,798
Tift County	(Georgia (U.S. state)) Georgia	1980	2024	41,344
Toombs County	(Georgia (U.S. state)) Georgia	1980	2024	27,030
Towns County	(Georgia (U.S. state)) Georgia	1980	2024	12,493
Treutlen County	(Georgia (U.S. state)) Georgia	1996	2024	6,406
Troup County	(Georgia (U.S. state)) Georgia	1980	2024	69,426
Turner County	(Georgia (U.S. state)) Georgia	1996	2024	9,006
Twiggs County	(Georgia (U.S. state)) Georgia	2012	2024	8,022
Union County	(Georgia (U.S. state)) Georgia	1980	2024	24,632
Upson County	(Georgia (U.S. state)) Georgia	1980	2024	27,700
Walker County	(Georgia (U.S. state)) Georgia	1976	2024	67,654
Walton County	(Georgia (U.S. state)) Georgia	1980	2024	96,673
Ware County	(Georgia (U.S. state)) Georgia	1980 (Note: The Democratic and Republican nominees were tied in the county in 1992.)	2024	36,251
Warren County	(Georgia (U.S. state)) Georgia	2024	1972	5,215
Washington County	(Georgia (U.S. state)) Georgia	2020	2024	19,988
Wayne County	(Georgia (U.S. state)) Georgia	1980	2024	30,144
Webster County	(Georgia (U.S. state)) Georgia	2004	2024	2,348
Wheeler County	(Georgia (U.S. state)) Georgia	1996	2024	7,471
White County	(Georgia (U.S. state)) Georgia	1980	2024	28,003
Whitfield County	(Georgia (U.S. state)) Georgia	1980	2024	102,864
Wilcox County	(Georgia (U.S. state)) Georgia	1996	2024	8,766
Wilkes County	(Georgia (U.S. state)) Georgia	1996	2024	9,565
Wilkinson County	(Georgia (U.S. state)) Georgia	2000	2024	8,877
Worth County	(Georgia (U.S. state)) Georgia	1992	2024	20,784
Hawaii County	Hawaii	2024	1984	200,629
Honolulu County	Hawaii	2024	1984	1,016,508
Kalawao County	Hawaii	2024	Never	82
Kauaʻi County	Hawaii	2024	1984	73,298
Maui County	Hawaii	2024	1984	164,754
Ada County	Idaho	1936	2024	494,967
Adams County	Idaho	1964	2024	4,379
Bannock County	Idaho	1964	2024	87,018
Bear Lake County	Idaho	1964	2024	6,372
Benewah County	Idaho	1992	2024	9,530
Bingham County	Idaho	1948	2024	47,992
Blaine County	Idaho	2024	1988	24,272
Boise County	Idaho	1964	2024	7,610
Bonner County	Idaho	1992	2024	47,110
Bonneville County	Idaho	1948	2024	123,964
Boundary County	Idaho	1964	2024	12,056
Butte County	Idaho	1964	2024	2,574
Camas County	Idaho	1960	2024	1,077
Canyon County	Idaho	1936	2024	231,105
Caribou County	Idaho	1964	2024	7,027
Cassia County	Idaho	1940	2024	24,655
Clark County	Idaho	1932	2024	790
Clearwater County	Idaho	1992	2024	8,734
Custer County	Idaho	1960	2024	4,275
Elmore County	Idaho	1964	2024	28,666
Franklin County	Idaho	1944	2024	14,194
Fremont County	Idaho	1964	2024	13,388
Gem County	Idaho	1964	2024	19,123
Gooding County	Idaho	1936	2024	15,598
Idaho County	Idaho	1964	2024	16,541
Jefferson County	Idaho	1948	2024	30,891
Jerome County	Idaho	1936	2024	24,237
Kootenai County	Idaho	1964	2024	171,362
Latah County	Idaho	2020	2024	39,517
Lemhi County	Idaho	1940	2024	7,974
Lewis County	Idaho	1992	2024	3,533
Lincoln County	Idaho	1936	2024	5,127
Madison County	Idaho	1948	2024	52,913
Minidoka County	Idaho	1948	2024	21,613
Nez Perce County	Idaho	1996	2024	42,090
Oneida County	Idaho	1948	2024	4,564
Owyhee County	Idaho	1940	2024	11,913
Payette County	Idaho	1936	2024	25,386
Power County	Idaho	1964	2024	7,878
Shoshone County	Idaho	1996	2024	13,169
Teton County	Idaho	2024	2016	11,630
Twin Falls County	Idaho	1936	2024	90,046
Valley County	Idaho	1964	2024	11,746
Washington County	Idaho	1964	2024	10,500
Adams County	Illinois	1964	2024	65,737
Alexander County	Illinois	2012	2024	5,240
Bond County	Illinois	1996	2024	16,725
Boone County	Illinois	2008	2024	53,448
Brown County	Illinois	1992	2024	6,244
Bureau County	Illinois	2008	2024	33,244
Calhoun County	Illinois	2008	2024	4,437
Carroll County	Illinois	2012	2024	15,702
Cass County	Illinois	2008	2024	13,042
Champaign County	Illinois	2024	1988	205,865
Christian County	Illinois	1996	2024	34,032
Clark County	Illinois	1992	2024	15,455
Clay County	Illinois	1996	2024	13,288
Clinton County	Illinois	1996	2024	36,899
Coles County	Illinois	2008	2024	46,863
Cook County	Illinois	2024	1972	5,275,541
Crawford County	Illinois	1992	2024	18,679
Cumberland County	Illinois	1992	2024	10,450
De Witt County	Illinois	1964	2024	15,516
DeKalb County	Illinois	2024	2004	100,420
Douglas County	Illinois	1992	2024	19,740
DuPage County	Illinois	2024	2004	932,877
Edgar County	Illinois	1992	2024	16,866
Edwards County	Illinois	1832	2024	6,245
Effingham County	Illinois	1964	2024	34,668
Fayette County	Illinois	1996	2024	21,488
Ford County	Illinois	1932	2024	13,534
Franklin County	Illinois	2000	2024	37,804
Fulton County	Illinois	2012	2024	33,609
Gallatin County	Illinois	2008	2024	4,946
Greene County	Illinois	1996	2024	11,985
Grundy County	Illinois	2008	2024	52,533
Hamilton County	Illinois	1996	2024	7,993
Hancock County	Illinois	1996	2024	17,620
Hardin County	Illinois	1996	2024	3,649
Henderson County	Illinois	2012	2024	6,387
Henry County	Illinois	2012	2024	49,284
Iroquois County	Illinois	1936	2024	27,077
Jackson County	Illinois	2024	1984	52,974
Jasper County	Illinois	1992	2024	9,287
Jefferson County	Illinois	1996	2024	37,113
Jersey County	Illinois	1996	2024	21,512
Jo Daviess County	Illinois	2012	2024	22,035
Johnson County	Illinois	1992	2024	13,308
Kane County	Illinois	2024	2004	516,522
Kankakee County	Illinois	2008	2024	107,502
Kendall County	Illinois	2024	2016	131,869
Knox County	Illinois	2012	2024	49,967
Lake County	Illinois	2024	2004	714,342
LaSalle County	Illinois	2008	2024	109,658
Lawrence County	Illinois	1996	2024	15,280
Lee County	Illinois	1852	2024	34,145
Livingston County	Illinois	1932	2024	35,815
Logan County	Illinois	1964	2024	27,987
Macon County	Illinois	2008	2024	103,998
Macoupin County	Illinois	2008	2024	44,967
Madison County	Illinois	2008	2024	265,859
Marion County	Illinois	1996	2024	37,729
Marshall County	Illinois	1996	2024	11,742
Mason County	Illinois	2008	2024	13,086
Massac County	Illinois	1996	2024	14,169
McDonough County	Illinois	2008	2024	27,238
McHenry County	Illinois	2008	2024	310,229
McLean County	Illinois	2024	2016	170,954
Menard County	Illinois	1964	2024	12,297
Mercer County	Illinois	2012	2024	15,699
Monroe County	Illinois	1992	2024	34,962
Montgomery County	Illinois	2008	2024	28,288
Morgan County	Illinois	1964	2024	32,915
Moultrie County	Illinois	1996	2024	14,526
Ogle County	Illinois	Never	2024	51,788
Peoria County	Illinois	2024	1988	181,830
Perry County	Illinois	2000	2024	20,945
Piatt County	Illinois	1996	2024	16,673
Pike County	Illinois	1996	2024	14,739
Pope County	Illinois	1996	2024	3,763
Pulaski County	Illinois	2008	2024	5,193
Putnam County	Illinois	2012	2024	5,637
Randolph County	Illinois	1996	2024	30,163
Richland County	Illinois	1992	2024	15,813
Rock Island County	Illinois	2024	1980	144,672
Saline County	Illinois	1996	2024	23,768
Sangamon County	Illinois	2008	2024	196,343
Schuyler County	Illinois	2008	2024	6,902
Scott County	Illinois	1964	2024	4,949
Shelby County	Illinois	1996	2024	20,990
St. Clair County	Illinois	2024	1972	257,400
Stark County	Illinois	1932	2024	5,400
Stephenson County	Illinois	2008	2024	44,630
Tazewell County	Illinois	1992	2024	131,343
Union County	Illinois	1996	2024	17,244
Vermilion County	Illinois	2008	2024	74,188
Wabash County	Illinois	1964	2024	11,361
Warren County	Illinois	2012	2024	16,835
Washington County	Illinois	1932	2024	13,761
Wayne County	Illinois	1964	2024	16,179
White County	Illinois	1996	2024	13,877
Whiteside County	Illinois	2012	2024	55,691
Will County	Illinois	2024	2004	696,355
Williamson County	Illinois	1996	2024	67,153
Winnebago County	Illinois	2024	2004	285,350
Woodford County	Illinois	1936	2024	38,467
Adams County	Indiana	1964	2024	35,809
Allen County	Indiana	1964	2024	385,410
Bartholomew County	Indiana	1964	2024	82,208
Benton County	Indiana	1964	2024	8,719
Blackford County	Indiana	1996	2024	12,112
Boone County	Indiana	1936	2024	70,812
Brown County	Indiana	1964	2024	15,475
Carroll County	Indiana	1964	2024	20,306
Cass County	Indiana	1964	2024	37,870
Clark County	Indiana	1996	2024	121,093
Clay County	Indiana	1964	2024	26,466
Clinton County	Indiana	1964	2024	33,190
Crawford County	Indiana	1996	2024	10,526
Daviess County	Indiana	1964	2024	33,381
Dearborn County	Indiana	1976	2024	50,679
Decatur County	Indiana	1964	2024	26,472
DeKalb County	Indiana	1964	2024	43,265
Delaware County	Indiana	2012	2024	111,903
Dubois County	Indiana	1976	2024	43,637
Elkhart County	Indiana	1964	2024	207,047
Fayette County	Indiana	1964	2024	23,398
Floyd County	Indiana	1996	2024	80,484
Fountain County	Indiana	1964	2024	16,479
Franklin County	Indiana	1964	2024	22,785
Fulton County	Indiana	1932	2024	20,480
Gibson County	Indiana	1996	2024	33,011
Grant County	Indiana	1964	2024	66,674
Greene County	Indiana	1992	2024	30,803
Hamilton County	Indiana	1912	2024	347,467
Hancock County	Indiana	1964	2024	79,840
Harrison County	Indiana	1992	2024	39,654
Hendricks County	Indiana	1912	2024	174,788
Henry County	Indiana	1964	2024	48,914
Howard County	Indiana	1964	2024	83,658
Huntington County	Indiana	1964	2024	36,662
Jackson County	Indiana	1964	2024	46,428
Jasper County	Indiana	1932	2024	32,918
Jay County	Indiana	1964	2024	20,478
Jefferson County	Indiana	1996	2024	33,147
Jennings County	Indiana	1964	2024	27,613
Johnson County	Indiana	1948	2024	161,765
Knox County	Indiana	1996	2024	36,282
Kosciusko County	Indiana	1932	2024	80,240
LaGrange County	Indiana	1964	2024	40,446
Lake County	Indiana	2024	1972	498,700
LaPorte County	Indiana	2012	2024	112,417
Lawrence County	Indiana	1964	2024	45,011
Madison County	Indiana	2008	2024	130,129
Marion County	Indiana	2024	2000	977,203
Marshall County	Indiana	1964	2024	46,095
Martin County	Indiana	1976	2024	9,812
Miami County	Indiana	1964	2024	35,962
Monroe County	Indiana	2024	2000	139,718
Montgomery County	Indiana	1964	2024	37,936
Morgan County	Indiana	1932	2024	71,780
Newton County	Indiana	1932	2024	71,780
Noble County	Indiana	1964	2024	13,830
Ohio County	Indiana	1976	2024	47,457
Orange County	Indiana	1964	2024	19,867
Owen County	Indiana	1976	2024	21,321
Parke County	Indiana	1964	2024	16,156
Perry County	Indiana	2012	2024	19,170
Pike County	Indiana	1996	2024	12,250
Porter County	Indiana	2012	2024	173,215
Posey County	Indiana	1996	2024	25,222
Pulaski County	Indiana	1964	2024	12,514
Putnam County	Indiana	1964	2024	36,726
Randolph County	Indiana	1964	2024	24,502
Ripley County	Indiana	1964	2024	28,995
Rush County	Indiana	1936	2024	16,752
Scott County	Indiana	2000	2024	24,384
Shelby County	Indiana	1964	2024	45,055
Spencer County	Indiana	2008	2024	19,810
St. Joseph County	Indiana	2024	2004	272,912
Starke County	Indiana	2008	2024	23,371
Steuben County	Indiana	1932	2024	34,435
Sullivan County	Indiana	1996	2024	20,817
Switzerland County	Indiana	1996	2024	9,737
Tippecanoe County	Indiana	2020	2024	186,251
Tipton County	Indiana	1964	2024	15,359
Union County	Indiana	1936	2024	7,087
Vanderburgh County	Indiana	2008	2024	180,136
Vermillion County	Indiana	2008	2024	15,439
Vigo County	Indiana	2012	2024	106,153
Wabash County	Indiana	1964	2024	30,976
Warren County	Indiana	1964	2024	8,440
Warrick County	Indiana	1996	2024	63,898
Washington County	Indiana	1992	2024	28,182
Wayne County	Indiana	1936	2024	66,553
Wells County	Indiana	1964	2024	28,180
White County	Indiana	1964	2024	24,688
Whitley County	Indiana	1964	2024	34,191
Adair County	Iowa	1996	2024	7,496
Adams County	Iowa	2008	2024	3,704
Allamakee County	Iowa	2012	2024	14,061
Appanoose County	Iowa	1996	2024	12,317
Audubon County	Iowa	2008	2024	5,674
Benton County	Iowa	2008	2024	25,575
Black Hawk County	Iowa	2024	1984	131,144
Boone County	Iowa	2012	2024	26,715
Bremer County	Iowa	2012	2024	24,988
Buchanan County	Iowa	2012	2024	20,565
Buena Vista County	Iowa	1988	2024	20,823
Butler County	Iowa	1996	2024	14,334
Calhoun County	Iowa	1996	2024	9,927
Carroll County	Iowa	2008	2024	20,760
Cass County	Iowa	1932	2024	13,127
Cedar County	Iowa	2012	2024	18,505
Cerro Gordo County	Iowa	2012	2024	43,127
Cherokee County	Iowa	1996	2024	11,658
Chickasaw County	Iowa	2012	2024	12,012
Clarke County	Iowa	2012	2024	9,748
Clay County	Iowa	1996	2024	16,384
Clayton County	Iowa	2012	2024	17,043
Clinton County	Iowa	2012	2024	46,460
Crawford County	Iowa	2008	2024	16,525
Dallas County	Iowa	1996	2024	99,678
Davis County	Iowa	1996	2024	9,110
Decatur County	Iowa	1996	2024	7,645
Delaware County	Iowa	2008	2024	17,488
Des Moines County	Iowa	2012	2024	38,910
Dickinson County	Iowa	1996	2024	17,703
Dubuque County	Iowa	2012	2024	99,266
Emmet County	Iowa	2008	2024	9,388
Fayette County	Iowa	2012	2024	19,509
Floyd County	Iowa	2012	2024	15,627
Franklin County	Iowa	2008	2024	10,019
Fremont County	Iowa	1964	2024	6,605
Greene County	Iowa	2008	2024	8,771
Grundy County	Iowa	1964	2024	12,329
Guthrie County	Iowa	1996	2024	10,623
Hamilton County	Iowa	2008	2024	15,039
Hancock County	Iowa	1996	2024	10,795
Hardin County	Iowa	2008	2024	16,878
Harrison County	Iowa	1964	2024	14,582
Henry County	Iowa	1996	2024	20,482
Howard County	Iowa	2012	2024	9,469
Humboldt County	Iowa	1988	2024	9,597
Ida County	Iowa	1964	2024	7,005
Iowa County	Iowa	2008	2024	16,662
Jackson County	Iowa	2012	2024	19,485
Jasper County	Iowa	2012	2024	37,813
Jefferson County	Iowa	2012	2024	15,663
Johnson County	Iowa	2024	1960	152,854
Jones County	Iowa	2012	2024	20,646
Keokuk County	Iowa	1996	2024	10,033
Kossuth County	Iowa	2008	2024	14,828
Lee County	Iowa	2012	2024	33,555
Linn County	Iowa	2024	1984	230,299
Louisa County	Iowa	2012	2024	10,837
Lucas County	Iowa	1996	2024	8,634
Lyon County	Iowa	1936	2024	11,934
Madison County	Iowa	1996	2024	16,548
Mahaska County	Iowa	1964	2024	22,190
Marion County	Iowa	1988	2024	33,414
Marshall County	Iowa	2012	2024	40,105
Mills County	Iowa	1964	2024	14,484
Mitchell County	Iowa	2012	2024	10,565
Monona County	Iowa	1996	2024	8,751
Monroe County	Iowa	1996	2024	7,577
Montgomery County	Iowa	1964	2024	10,330
Muscatine County	Iowa	2012	2024	43,235
O'Brien County	Iowa	1936	2024	14,182
Osceola County	Iowa	1964	2024	6,192
Page County	Iowa	1932	2024	15,211
Palo Alto County	Iowa	2008	2024	8,996
Plymouth County	Iowa	1964	2024	25,698
Pocahontas County	Iowa	1996	2024	7,078
Polk County	Iowa	2024	1980	492,401
Pottawattamie County	Iowa	1964	2024	93,667
Poweshiek County	Iowa	2012	2024	18,662
Ringgold County	Iowa	1996	2024	4,663
Sac County	Iowa	1988	2024	9,814
Scott County	Iowa	2020	2024	174,669
Shelby County	Iowa	1964	2024	11,746
Sioux County	Iowa	1936	2024	35,872
Story County	Iowa	2024	1984	98,537
Tama County	Iowa	2012	2024	17,135
Taylor County	Iowa	1996	2024	5,896
Union County	Iowa	2012	2024	12,138
Van Buren County	Iowa	1996	2024	7,203
Wapello County	Iowa	2012	2024	35,437
Warren County	Iowa	2008	2024	52,403
Washington County	Iowa	1996	2024	22,565
Wayne County	Iowa	1996	2024	6,497
Webster County	Iowa	2012	2024	36,999
Winnebago County	Iowa	2008	2024	10,679
Winneshiek County	Iowa	2012	2024	20,070
Woodbury County	Iowa	2012	2024	105,941
Worth County	Iowa	2012	2024	7,443
Wright County	Iowa	1996	2024	12,943
Allen County	Kansas	1964	2024	12,526
Anderson County	Kansas	1976	2024	7,836
Atchison County	Kansas	1996	2024	16,348
Barber County	Kansas	1964	2024	4,228
Barton County	Kansas	1964	2024	25,493
Bourbon County	Kansas	1964	2024	14,360
Brown County	Kansas	1912	2024	9,508
Butler County	Kansas	1976	2024	67,380
Chase County	Kansas	1936	2024	2,572
Chautauqua County	Kansas	1932	2024	3,379
Cherokee County	Kansas	1992	2024	19,362
Cheyenne County	Kansas	1936	2024	2,616
Clark County	Kansas	1964	2024	1,991
Clay County	Kansas	1932	2024	8,117
Cloud County	Kansas	1976	2024	9,032
Coffey County	Kansas	1932	2024	8,360
Comanche County	Kansas	1964	2024	1,689
Cowley County	Kansas	1964	2024	34,549
Crawford County	Kansas	2008	2024	38,972
Decatur County	Kansas	1936	2024	2,764
Dickinson County	Kansas	1932	2024	18,402
Doniphan County	Kansas	Never	2024	7,510
Douglas County	Kansas	2024	1988	118,785
Edwards County	Kansas	1976	2024	2,907
Elk County	Kansas	1932	2024	2,483
Ellis County	Kansas	1992	2024	28,934
Ellsworth County	Kansas	1964	2024	6,376
Finney County	Kansas	1976	2024	38,470
Ford County	Kansas	1976	2024	34,287
Franklin County	Kansas	1964	2024	25,996
Geary County	Kansas	1964	2024	36,739
Gove County	Kansas	1964	2024	2,718
Graham County	Kansas	1936	2024	2,415
Grant County	Kansas	1964	2024	7,352
Gray County	Kansas	1976	2024	5,653
Greeley County	Kansas	1976	2024	1,284
Greenwood County	Kansas	1936	2024	6,016
Hamilton County	Kansas	1976	2024	2,518
Harper County	Kansas	1936	2024	5,485
Harvey County	Kansas	1964	2024	34,024
Haskell County	Kansas	1964	2024	3,780
Hodgeman County	Kansas	1976	2024	1,723
Jackson County	Kansas	1932	2024	13,232
Jefferson County	Kansas	1932	2024	18,368
Jewell County	Kansas	1932	2024	2,932
Johnson County	Kansas	2024	2016	609,863
Kearny County	Kansas	1964	2024	3,983
Kingman County	Kansas	1976	2024	7,470
Kiowa County	Kansas	1936	2024	2,460
Labette County	Kansas	1992	2024	20,184
Lane County	Kansas	1964	2024	1,574
Leavenworth County	Kansas	1992	2024	81,881
Lincoln County	Kansas	1936	2024	2,939
Linn County	Kansas	1932	2024	9,591
Logan County	Kansas	1932	2024	2,762
Lyon County	Kansas	1964	2024	32,179
Marion County	Kansas	1936	2024	11,823
Marshall County	Kansas	1932	2024	10,038
McPherson County	Kansas	1964	2024	30,223
Meade County	Kansas	1936	2024	4,055
Miami County	Kansas	1992	2024	34,191
Mitchell County	Kansas	1936	2024	5,796
Montgomery County	Kansas	1964	2024	31,486
Morris County	Kansas	1936	2024	5,386
Morton County	Kansas	1964	2024	2,701
Nemaha County	Kansas	1964	2024	10,273
Neosho County	Kansas	1964	2024	15,904
Ness County	Kansas	1976	2024	2,687
Norton County	Kansas	1932	2024	5,459
Osage County	Kansas	1964	2024	15,766
Osborne County	Kansas	1916	2024	3,500
Ottawa County	Kansas	1964	2024	5,735
Pawnee County	Kansas	1976	2024	6,253
Phillips County	Kansas	1932	2024	4,981
Pottawatomie County	Kansas	1932	2024	25,348
Pratt County	Kansas	1964	2024	9,157
Rawlins County	Kansas	1936	2024	2,561
Reno County	Kansas	1976	2024	61,898
Republic County	Kansas	1932	2024	4,674
Rice County	Kansas	1976	2024	9,427
Riley County	Kansas	2024	2016	71,959
Rooks County	Kansas	1936	2024	4,919
Rush County	Kansas	1976	2024	2,956
Russell County	Kansas	1964	2024	6,691
Saline County	Kansas	1964	2024	54,303
Scott County	Kansas	1936	2024	5,151
Sedgwick County	Kansas	1964	2024	523,824
Seward County	Kansas	1936	2024	21,964
Shawnee County	Kansas	2024	2016	178,909
Sheridan County	Kansas	1964	2024	2,447
Sherman County	Kansas	1964	2024	5,927
Smith County	Kansas	1932	2024	3,570
Stafford County	Kansas	1976	2024	4,072
Stanton County	Kansas	1964	2024	2,084
Stevens County	Kansas	1964	2024	5,250
Sumner County	Kansas	1976	2024	22,382
Thomas County	Kansas	1964	2024	7,930
Trego County	Kansas	1964	2024	2,808
Wabaunsee County	Kansas	1932	2024	6,877
Wallace County	Kansas	1932	2024	1,512
Washington County	Kansas	1932	2024	5,530
Wichita County	Kansas	1976	2024	2,152
Wilson County	Kansas	1932	2024	8,624
Woodson County	Kansas	1932	2024	3,115
Wyandotte County	Kansas	2024	1972	169,245
Adair County	Kentucky	1932	2024	18,903
Allen County	Kentucky	1912	2024	20,588
Anderson County	Kentucky	1980	2024	23,852
Ballard County	Kentucky	2000	2024	7,728
Barren County	Kentucky	1992	2024	44,485
Bath County	Kentucky	2004	2024	12,750
Bell County	Kentucky	1996	2024	24,097
Boone County	Kentucky	1964 (Note: The Democratic and Republican nominees were tied in the county in 1976.)	2024	135,968
Bourbon County	Kentucky	1996	2024	20,252
Boyd County	Kentucky	2000	2024	48,261
Boyle County	Kentucky	1980	2024	30,614
Bracken County	Kentucky	1992	2024	8,400
Breathitt County	Kentucky	2004	2024	13,718
Breckinridge County	Kentucky	1992	2024	20,432
Bullitt County	Kentucky	1992	2024	82,217
Butler County	Kentucky	1864	2024	12,371
Caldwell County	Kentucky	1996	2024	12,649
Calloway County	Kentucky	1996	2024	37,103
Campbell County	Kentucky	1964	2024	93,076
Carlisle County	Kentucky	1996	2024	4,826
Carroll County	Kentucky	1996	2024	10,810
Carter County	Kentucky	2004	2024	26,627
Casey County	Kentucky	1912	2024	15,941
Christian County	Kentucky	1976	2024	72,748
Clark County	Kentucky	1996	2024	36,972
Clay County	Kentucky	1860 (Note: Won by Southern Democratic nominee John C. Breckinridge.)	2024	20,345
Clinton County	Kentucky	1868	2024	9,253
Crittenden County	Kentucky	1992	2024	8,990
Cumberland County	Kentucky	1868	2024	5,888
Daviess County	Kentucky	1992	2024	103,312
Edmonson County	Kentucky	1912	2024	12,126
Elliott County	Kentucky	2012	2024	7,354
Estill County	Kentucky	1964	2024	14,163
Fayette County	Kentucky	2024	2004	322,570
Fleming County	Kentucky	1992	2024	15,082
Floyd County	Kentucky	2004	2024	35,942
Franklin County	Kentucky	2012	2024	51,541
Fulton County	Kentucky	2000	2024	6,515
Gallatin County	Kentucky	1996	2024	8,690
Garrard County	Kentucky	1964	2024	16,953
Grant County	Kentucky	1980	2024	24,941
Graves County	Kentucky	1996	2024	36,649
Grayson County	Kentucky	1932	2024	26,420
Green County	Kentucky	1964	2024	11,107
Greenup County	Kentucky	1996	2024	35,962
Hancock County	Kentucky	2008	2024	9,095
Hardin County	Kentucky	1976	2024	110,702
Harlan County	Kentucky	2000	2024	26,831
Harrison County	Kentucky	1996	2024	18,692
Hart County	Kentucky	1992	2024	19,288
Henderson County	Kentucky	2008	2024	44,793
Henry County	Kentucky	1996	2024	15,678
Hickman County	Kentucky	1996	2024	4,521
Hopkins County	Kentucky	1996	2024	45,423
Jackson County	Kentucky	Never	2024	12,955
Jefferson County	Kentucky	2024	1988	782,969
Jessamine County	Kentucky	1964	2024	52,991
Johnson County	Kentucky	1996	2024	22,680
Kenton County	Kentucky	1964	2024	169,064
Knott County	Kentucky	2004	2024	14,251
Knox County	Kentucky	1964	2024	30,193
LaRue County	Kentucky	1992	2024	14,867
Laurel County	Kentucky	1912	2024	62,613
Lawrence County	Kentucky	1996	2024	16,293
Lee County	Kentucky	1964	2024	7,395
Leslie County	Kentucky	Never	2024	10,513
Letcher County	Kentucky	2000	2024	21,548
Lewis County	Kentucky	1876	2024	13,080
Lincoln County	Kentucky	1976	2024	24,275
Livingston County	Kentucky	1996	2024	8,888
Logan County	Kentucky	1996	2024	27,432
Lyon County	Kentucky	1996	2024	8,680
Madison County	Kentucky	1976	2024	92,701
Magoffin County	Kentucky	2004	2024	11,637
Marion County	Kentucky	1996	2024	19,581
Marshall County	Kentucky	1996	2024	31,659
Martin County	Kentucky	1996	2024	11,287
Mason County	Kentucky	1992	2024	17,120
McCracken County	Kentucky	1996	2024	67,875
McCreary County	Kentucky	Never	2024	16,888
McLean County	Kentucky	1996	2024	9,152
Meade County	Kentucky	1996	2024	30,003
Menifee County	Kentucky	2008	2024	6,113
Mercer County	Kentucky	1980	2024	22,641
Metcalfe County	Kentucky	1992	2024	10,286
Monroe County	Kentucky	1864	2024	11,338
Montgomery County	Kentucky	1996	2024	28,114
Morgan County	Kentucky	1996	2024	13,726
Muhlenberg County	Kentucky	2000	2024	30,928
Nelson County	Kentucky	1996	2024	46,738
Nicholas County	Kentucky	1996	2024	7,537
Ohio County	Kentucky	1996	2024	23,772
Oldham County	Kentucky	1964	2024	67,607
Owen County	Kentucky	1992	2024	11,278
Owsley County	Kentucky	1860	2024	4,051
Pendleton County	Kentucky	1980	2024	14,644
Perry County	Kentucky	2000	2024	28,473
Pike County	Kentucky	2004	2024	58,669
Powell County	Kentucky	1996	2024	13,129
Pulaski County	Kentucky	1912	2024	65,034
Robertson County	Kentucky	1992	2024	2,193
Rockcastle County	Kentucky	1880	2024	16,037
Rowan County	Kentucky	2008	2024	24,662
Russell County	Kentucky	1884	2024	17,991
Scott County	Kentucky	1980	2024	57,155
Shelby County	Kentucky	1980	2024	48,065
Simpson County	Kentucky	1996	2024	19,594
Spencer County	Kentucky	1992	2024	19,490
Taylor County	Kentucky	1976	2024	26,023
Todd County	Kentucky	1992	2024	12,243
Trigg County	Kentucky	1996	2024	14,061
Trimble County	Kentucky	1996	2024	8,474
Union County	Kentucky	1996	2024	13,668
Warren County	Kentucky	1976	2024	134,554
Washington County	Kentucky	1980	2024	12,027
Wayne County	Kentucky	1964	2024	19,555
Webster County	Kentucky	1996	2024	13,017
Whitley County	Kentucky	1964	2024	36,712
Wolfe County	Kentucky	2008	2024	6,562
Woodford County	Kentucky	1980	2024	26,871
Acadia Parish	Louisiana	1996	2024	57,576
Allen Parish	Louisiana	1996	2024	22,750
Ascension Parish	Louisiana	1996	2024	126,500
Assumption Parish	Louisiana	2004	2024	21,039
Avoyelles Parish	Louisiana	1996	2024	39,693
Beauregard Parish	Louisiana	1980	2024	36,549
Bienville Parish	Louisiana	2000	2024	12,981
Bossier Parish	Louisiana	1944	2024	128,746
Caddo Parish	Louisiana	2024	2004	237,848
Calcasieu Parish	Louisiana	1996	2024	216,785
Caldwell Parish	Louisiana	1996	2024	9,645
Cameron Parish	Louisiana	1996	2024	5,617
Catahoula Parish	Louisiana	1996	2024	8,906
Claiborne Parish	Louisiana	1996	2024	14,170
Concordia Parish	Louisiana	1996	2024	18,687
De Soto Parish	Louisiana	1996	2024	26,812
East Baton Rouge Parish	Louisiana	2024	2004	456,781
East Carroll Parish	Louisiana	2024	1972	7,459
East Feliciana Parish	Louisiana	1996	2024	19,539
Evangeline Parish	Louisiana	1996	2024	32,350
Franklin Parish	Louisiana	1996	2024	19,774
Grant Parish	Louisiana	1976	2024	22,169
Iberia Parish	Louisiana	1996	2024	69,929
Iberville Parish	Louisiana	2020	2024	30,241
Jackson Parish	Louisiana	1996	2024	15,031
Jefferson Davis Parish	Louisiana	1996	2024	32,250
Jefferson Parish	Louisiana	1960	2024	440,781
Lafayette Parish	Louisiana	1964	2024	241,753
Lafourche Parish	Louisiana	1996	2024	97,557
LaSalle Parish	Louisiana	1952	2024	14,791
Lincoln Parish	Louisiana	1996	2024	48,396
Livingston Parish	Louisiana	1980	2024	142,282
Madison Parish	Louisiana	2024	1972	10,017
Morehouse Parish	Louisiana	1996	2024	25,629
Natchitoches Parish	Louisiana	1996	2024	37,515
Orleans Parish	Louisiana	2024	1972	383,997
Ouachita Parish	Louisiana	1952	2024	160,368
Plaquemines Parish	Louisiana	1996	2024	23,515
Pointe Coupee Parish	Louisiana	2004	2024	20,758
Rapides Parish	Louisiana	1996	2024	130,023
Red River Parish	Louisiana	1996	2024	7,620
Richland Parish	Louisiana	1996	2024	20,043
Sabine Parish	Louisiana	1996	2024	22,155
St. Bernard Parish	Louisiana	1996	2024	43,764
St. Charles Parish	Louisiana	1996	2024	52,549
St. Helena Parish	Louisiana	2024	1972	10,920
St. James Parish	Louisiana	2020	2024	20,192
St. John the Baptist Parish	Louisiana	2024	1984	42,477
St. Landry Parish	Louisiana	2000	2024	82,540
St. Martin Parish	Louisiana	1996	2024	51,767
St. Mary Parish	Louisiana	1996	2024	49,406
St. Tammany Parish	Louisiana	1960	2024	264,570
Tangipahoa Parish	Louisiana	1996	2024	133,157
Tensas Parish	Louisiana	2020	2024	4,147
Terrebonne Parish	Louisiana	1996	2024	109,580
Union Parish	Louisiana	1952	2024	21,107
Vermilion Parish	Louisiana	1996	2024	57,359
Vernon Parish	Louisiana	1996	2024	48,750
Washington Parish	Louisiana	1996	2024	45,463
Webster Parish	Louisiana	1996	2024	36,967
West Baton Rouge Parish	Louisiana	2000	2024	27,199
West Carroll Parish	Louisiana	1976	2024	9,751
West Feliciana Parish	Louisiana	1996	2024	15,310
Winn Parish	Louisiana	1996	2024	13,755
Androscoggin County	Maine	2012	2024	111,139
Aroostook County	Maine	2012	2024	67,105
Cumberland County	Maine	2024	1988	303,069
Franklin County	Maine	2012	2024	29,456
Hancock County	Maine	2024	1988	55,478
Kennebec County	Maine	2020	2024	123,642
Knox County	Maine	2024	1988	40,607
Lincoln County	Maine	2024	2000	35,237
Oxford County	Maine	2012	2024	57,777
Penobscot County	Maine	2012	2024	152,199
Piscataquis County	Maine	1996	2024	16,800
Sagadahoc County	Maine	2024	1988	36,699
Somerset County	Maine	2012	2024	50,477
Waldo County	Maine	2024	2000	39,607
Washington County	Maine	2012	2024	31,095
York County	Maine	2024	1988	211,972
Allegany County	Maryland	1976	2024	68,106
Anne Arundel County	Maryland	2024	2012	588,261
Baltimore City	Maryland	2024	1956	585,708
Baltimore County	Maryland	2024	1988	854,535
Calvert County	Maryland	1976	2024	92,783
Caroline County	Maryland	1964	2024	33,293
Carroll County	Maryland	1964	2024	172,891
Cecil County	Maryland	1976	2024	103,725
Charles County	Maryland	2024	1996	166,617
Dorchester County	Maryland	1996	2024	32,531
Frederick County	Maryland	2024	2016	271,717
Garrett County	Maryland	Never	2024	28,806
Harford County	Maryland	1964	2024	260,924
Howard County	Maryland	2024	1988	332,317
Kent County	Maryland	2020	2024	19,198
Montgomery County	Maryland	2024	1984	1,062,061
Prince George's County	Maryland	2024	1972	967,201
Queen Anne's County	Maryland	1964	2024	49,874
Somerset County	Maryland	2012	2024	24,620
St. Mary's County	Maryland	1976	2024	113,777
Talbot County	Maryland	2020	2024	37,526
Washington County	Maryland	1964	2024	154,705
Wicomico County	Maryland	1964	2024	103,588
Worcester County	Maryland	1964	2024	52,460
Barnstable County	Massachusetts	2024	1988	228,996
Berkshire County	Massachusetts	2024	1984	129,026
Bristol County	Massachusetts	2024	1956	579,200
Dukes County	Massachusetts	2024	1972	20,600
Essex County	Massachusetts	2024	1984	809,829
Franklin County	Massachusetts	2024	1984	71,029
Hampden County	Massachusetts	2024	1984	465,825
Hampshire County	Massachusetts	2024	1956	162,308
Middlesex County	Massachusetts	2024	1956	1,632,002
Nantucket	Massachusetts	2024	1984	14,255
Norfolk County	Massachusetts	2024	1984	725,981
Plymouth County	Massachusetts	2024	1988	530,819
Suffolk County	Massachusetts	2024	1924	797,936
Worcester County	Massachusetts	2024	1988	862,111
Alcona County	Michigan	1996	2024	10,167
Alger County	Michigan	2008	2024	8,842
Allegan County	Michigan	1964	2024	120,502
Alpena County	Michigan	2008	2024	28,907
Antrim County	Michigan	1964	2024	23,431
Arenac County	Michigan	2008	2024	15,002
Baraga County	Michigan	1996	2024	8,158
Barry County	Michigan	1964	2024	62,423
Bay County	Michigan	2012	2024	103,856
Benzie County	Michigan	2008	2024	17,970
Berrien County	Michigan	2008	2024	154,316
Branch County	Michigan	1996	2024	44,862
Calhoun County	Michigan	2012	2024	134,310
Cass County	Michigan	2008	2024	51,589
Charlevoix County	Michigan	1992	2024	26,054
Cheboygan County	Michigan	1996	2024	25,579
Chippewa County	Michigan	1996	2024	36,785
Clare County	Michigan	2008	2024	30,856
Clinton County	Michigan	2008	2024	79,128
Crawford County	Michigan	1996	2024	12,988
Delta County	Michigan	2008	2024	36,903
Dickinson County	Michigan	1996	2024	25,947
Eaton County	Michigan	2012	2024	109,175
Emmet County	Michigan	1964	2024	34,112
Genesee County	Michigan	2024	1984	406,211
Gladwin County	Michigan	2008	2024	25,386
Gogebic County	Michigan	2012	2024	14,380
Grand Traverse County	Michigan	1964	2024	95,238
Gratiot County	Michigan	2008	2024	41,761
Hillsdale County	Michigan	1964	2024	45,746
Houghton County	Michigan	1996	2024	37,361
Huron County	Michigan	1996	2024	31,407
Ingham County	Michigan	2024	1988	284,900
Ionia County	Michigan	1964	2024	66,804
Iosco County	Michigan	2008	2024	25,237
Iron County	Michigan	2008	2024	11,631
Isabella County	Michigan	2012	2024	64,394
Jackson County	Michigan	2008	2024	160,366
Kalamazoo County	Michigan	2024	1988	261,670
Kalkaska County	Michigan	1996	2024	17,939
Kent County	Michigan	2024	2016	657,974
Keweenaw County	Michigan	1996	2024	2,046
Lake County	Michigan	2012	2024	12,096
Lapeer County	Michigan	1996	2024	88,619
Leelanau County	Michigan	2024	2016	22,301
Lenawee County	Michigan	2008	2024	99,423
Livingston County	Michigan	1964	2024	193,866
Luce County	Michigan	1996	2024	5,339
Mackinac County	Michigan	1996	2024	10,834
Macomb County	Michigan	2012	2024	881,217
Manistee County	Michigan	2012	2024	25,032
Marquette County	Michigan	2024	1984	66,017
Mason County	Michigan	2008	2024	29,052
Mecosta County	Michigan	1996	2024	39,714
Menominee County	Michigan	2008	2024	23,502
Midland County	Michigan	1964	2024	83,494
Missaukee County	Michigan	Never	2024	15,052
Monroe County	Michigan	2012	2024	154,809
Montcalm County	Michigan	1996	2024	66,614
Montmorency County	Michigan	1996	2024	9,153
Muskegon County	Michigan	2020	2024	175,824
Newaygo County	Michigan	1964	2024	49,978
Oakland County	Michigan	2024	1992	1,274,395
Oceana County	Michigan	2008	2024	26,659
Ogemaw County	Michigan	2008	2024	20,770
Ontonagon County	Michigan	2008	2024	5,816
Osceola County	Michigan	1996	2024	22,891
Oscoda County	Michigan	1996	2024	8,219
Otsego County	Michigan	1964	2024	25,091
Ottawa County	Michigan	1864	2024	296,200
Presque Isle County	Michigan	2008	2024	12,982
Roscommon County	Michigan	2008	2024	23,459
Saginaw County	Michigan	2020	2024	190,124
Sanilac County	Michigan	1852	2024	40,611
Schoolcraft County	Michigan	2008	2024	8,047
Shiawassee County	Michigan	2012	2024	68,094
St. Clair County	Michigan	2008	2024	160,383
St. Joseph County	Michigan	1964	2024	60,939
Tuscola County	Michigan	1996	2024	53,323
Van Buren County	Michigan	2012	2024	75,587
Washtenaw County	Michigan	2024	1984	372,258
Wayne County	Michigan	2024	1928	1,793,561
Wexford County	Michigan	1996	2024	33,673
Aitkin County	Minnesota	2008	2024	15,697
Anoka County	Minnesota	1996	2024	363,887
Becker County	Minnesota	1996	2024	35,183
Beltrami County	Minnesota	2012	2024	46,228
Benton County	Minnesota	1996	2024	41,379
Big Stone County	Minnesota	2008	2024	5,166
Blue Earth County	Minnesota	2020	2024	69,112
Brown County	Minnesota	1964	2024	25,912
Carlton County	Minnesota	2020	2024	36,207
Carver County	Minnesota	1932	2024	106,922
Cass County	Minnesota	1996	2024	30,066
Chippewa County	Minnesota	2012	2024	12,598
Chisago County	Minnesota	1996	2024	56,621
Clay County	Minnesota	2024	2016	65,318
Clearwater County	Minnesota	1996	2024	8,524
Cook County	Minnesota	2024	2000	5,600
Cottonwood County	Minnesota	1996	2024	11,517
Crow Wing County	Minnesota	1996	2024	66,123
Dakota County	Minnesota	2024	2004	439,882
Dodge County	Minnesota	1996	2024	20,867
Douglas County	Minnesota	1976	2024	39,006
Faribault County	Minnesota	1996	2024	13,921
Fillmore County	Minnesota	2012	2024	21,228
Freeborn County	Minnesota	2012	2024	30,895
Goodhue County	Minnesota	1996	2024	47,582
Grant County	Minnesota	2008	2024	6,074
Hennepin County	Minnesota	2024	1972	1,281,565
Houston County	Minnesota	2012	2024	18,843
Hubbard County	Minnesota	1996	2024	21,344
Isanti County	Minnesota	1996	2024	41,135
Itasca County	Minnesota	2012	2024	45,014
Jackson County	Minnesota	1996	2024	9,989
Kanabec County	Minnesota	1996	2024	16,032
Kandiyohi County	Minnesota	1996	2024	43,732
Kittson County	Minnesota	2012	2024	4,207
Koochiching County	Minnesota	2012	2024	12,062
Lac qui Parle County	Minnesota	2012	2024	6,719
Lake County	Minnesota	2024	1932	10,905
Lake of the Woods County	Minnesota	1996	2024	3,763
Le Sueur County	Minnesota	1996	2024	28,674
Lincoln County	Minnesota	2008	2024	5,640
Lyon County	Minnesota	1996	2024	25,269
Mahnomen County	Minnesota	2012	2024	5,411
Marshall County	Minnesota	2008	2024	9,040
Martin County	Minnesota	1996	2024	20,025
McLeod County	Minnesota	1996	2024	36,771
Meeker County	Minnesota	1996	2024	23,400
Mille Lacs County	Minnesota	1996	2024	26,459
Morrison County	Minnesota	1996	2024	34,010
Mower County	Minnesota	2012	2024	40,029
Murray County	Minnesota	2008	2024	8,179
Nicollet County	Minnesota	2020	2024	34,454
Nobles County	Minnesota	1996	2024	22,290
Norman County	Minnesota	2012	2024	6,441
Olmsted County	Minnesota	2024	2004	162,847
Otter Tail County	Minnesota	1932	2024	60,081
Pennington County	Minnesota	2008	2024	13,992
Pine County	Minnesota	2008	2024	28,876
Pipestone County	Minnesota	1976	2024	9,424
Polk County	Minnesota	2008	2024	31,192
Pope County	Minnesota	2008	2024	11,308
Ramsey County	Minnesota	2024	1924	552,352
Red Lake County	Minnesota	2008	2024	3,935
Redwood County	Minnesota	1964	2024	15,425
Renville County	Minnesota	1996	2024	14,723
Rice County	Minnesota	2012	2024	67,097
Rock County	Minnesota	1964	2024	9,704
Roseau County	Minnesota	1976	2024	15,331
Scott County	Minnesota	1996	2024	150,928
Sherburne County	Minnesota	1996	2024	97,183
Sibley County	Minnesota	1996	2024	14,836
St. Louis County	Minnesota	2024	1928	200,231
Stearns County	Minnesota	1996	2024	158,292
Steele County	Minnesota	1996	2024	37,406
Stevens County	Minnesota	2008	2024	9,671
Swift County	Minnesota	2012	2024	9,838
Todd County	Minnesota	1996	2024	25,262
Traverse County	Minnesota	2012	2024	3,360
Wabasha County	Minnesota	1996	2024	21,387
Wadena County	Minnesota	1976	2024	14,065
Waseca County	Minnesota	1996	2024	18,968
Washington County	Minnesota	2024	2004	267,568
Watonwan County	Minnesota	2008	2024	11,253
Wilkin County	Minnesota	1976	2024	6,506
Winona County	Minnesota	2020	2024	49,671
Wright County	Minnesota	1996	2024	141,337
Yellow Medicine County	Minnesota	2008	2024	9,528
Adams County	Mississippi	2024	1988	29,538
Alcorn County	Mississippi	1996	2024	34,740
Amite County	Mississippi	1996	2024	12,720
Attala County	Mississippi	1980	2024	17,889
Benton County	Mississippi	2012	2024	7,646
Bolivar County	Mississippi	2024	1972	30,985
Calhoun County	Mississippi	1980	2024	13,266
Carroll County	Mississippi	1976	2024	9,998
Chickasaw County	Mississippi	2012	2024	17,106
Choctaw County	Mississippi	1960	2024	8,246
Claiborne County	Mississippi	2024	1964	9,135
Clarke County	Mississippi	1956 (Note: The Democratic and Republican nominees were tied in the county in 1980.)	2024	15,615
Clay County	Mississippi	2024	1984	18,636
Coahoma County	Mississippi	2024	1972	21,390
Copiah County	Mississippi	2020	2024	28,368
Covington County	Mississippi	1976	2024	18,340
DeSoto County	Mississippi	1976	2024	185,314
Forrest County	Mississippi	1944	2024	78,158
Franklin County	Mississippi	1980	2024	7,675
George County	Mississippi	1976	2024	24,350
Greene County	Mississippi	1976	2024	13,530
Grenada County	Mississippi	1980	2024	21,629
Hancock County	Mississippi	1976	2024	46,053
Harrison County	Mississippi	1960	2024	208,621
Hinds County	Mississippi	2024	1992	227,742
Holmes County	Mississippi	2024	1964	17,000
Humphreys County	Mississippi	2024	1972	7,785
Issaquena County	Mississippi	2020	2024	1,338
Itawamba County	Mississippi	1980	2024	23,863
Jackson County	Mississippi	1960	2024	143,252
Jasper County	Mississippi	2020	2024	16,367
Jefferson County	Mississippi	2024	1964	7,260
Jefferson Davis County	Mississippi	2024	1984	11,321
Jones County	Mississippi	1960	2024	67,246
Kemper County	Mississippi	2024	1988	8,988
Lafayette County	Mississippi	1980	2024	55,813
Lamar County	Mississippi	1956	2024	64,222
Lauderdale County	Mississippi	1956	2024	72,984
Lawrence County	Mississippi	1996	2024	12,016
Leake County	Mississippi	1980	2024	21,275
Lee County	Mississippi	1980	2024	83,343
Leflore County	Mississippi	2024	1988	28,339
Lincoln County	Mississippi	1956	2024	34,907
Lowndes County	Mississippi	1956	2024	58,879
Madison County	Mississippi	1980	2024	109,145
Marion County	Mississippi	1980	2024	24,441
Marshall County	Mississippi	2020	2024	33,752
Monroe County	Mississippi	1980	2024	34,180
Montgomery County	Mississippi	1996	2024	9,822
Neshoba County	Mississippi	1976	2024	29,087
Newton County	Mississippi	1956	2024	21,291
Noxubee County	Mississippi	2024	1972	10,285
Oktibbeha County	Mississippi	2020	2024	51,788
Panola County	Mississippi	2012	2024	33,208
Pearl River County	Mississippi	1976	2024	56,145
Perry County	Mississippi	1976	2024	11,511
Pike County	Mississippi	2020	2024	40,324
Pontotoc County	Mississippi	1980	2024	31,184
Prentiss County	Mississippi	1980	2024	25,008
Quitman County	Mississippi	2024	1972	6,176
Rankin County	Mississippi	1956	2024	157,031
Scott County	Mississippi	1956	2024	27,990
Sharkey County	Mississippi	2024	1972	3,800
Simpson County	Mississippi	1956	2024	25,949
Smith County	Mississippi	1960	2024	14,209
Stone County	Mississippi	1976	2024	18,333
Sunflower County	Mississippi	2024	1984	25,971
Tallahatchie County	Mississippi	2024	1984	12,715
Tate County	Mississippi	1980	2024	28,064
Tippah County	Mississippi	1980	2024	21,815
Tishomingo County	Mississippi	1992	2024	18,850
Tunica County	Mississippi	2024	1972	9,782
Union County	Mississippi	1980	2024	27,777
Walthall County	Mississippi	1996	2024	13,884
Warren County	Mississippi	2020	2024	44,722
Washington County	Mississippi	2024	1988	44,922
Wayne County	Mississippi	1976	2024	19,779
Webster County	Mississippi	1976	2024	9,926
Wilkinson County	Mississippi	2024	1972	8,587
Winston County	Mississippi	1980	2024	17,714
Yalobusha County	Mississippi	2000	2024	12,481
Yazoo County	Mississippi	2020	2024	26,743
Adair County	Missouri	1992	2024	25,314
Andrew County	Missouri	1992	2024	18,135
Atchison County	Missouri	1992	2024	5,305
Audrain County	Missouri	1996	2024	24,962
Barry County	Missouri	1964	2024	34,534
Barton County	Missouri	1964	2024	11,637
Bates County	Missouri	1996	2024	16,042
Benton County	Missouri	1996	2024	19,394
Bollinger County	Missouri	1976	2024	10,567
Boone County	Missouri	2024	2004	183,610
Buchanan County	Missouri	2008	2024	84,793
Butler County	Missouri	1992	2024	42,130
Caldwell County	Missouri	1996	2024	8,815
Callaway County	Missouri	1996	2024	44,283
Camden County	Missouri	1932	2024	42,745
Cape Girardeau County	Missouri	1964	2024	81,710
Carroll County	Missouri	1996	2024	8,495
Carter County	Missouri	1992	2024	5,202
Cass County	Missouri	1976	2024	107,824
Cedar County	Missouri	1932	2024	14,188
Chariton County	Missouri	1996	2024	7,408
Christian County	Missouri	1932	2024	88,842
Clark County	Missouri	1996	2024	6,634
Clay County	Missouri	2000	2024	253,335
Clinton County	Missouri	1996	2024	21,184
Cole County	Missouri	1948	2024	77,279
Cooper County	Missouri	1964	2024	17,103
Crawford County	Missouri	1996	2024	23,056
Dade County	Missouri	1932	2024	7,569
Dallas County	Missouri	1992	2024	17,071
Daviess County	Missouri	1996	2024	8,430
DeKalb County	Missouri	1996	2024	11,029
Dent County	Missouri	1992	2024	14,421
Douglas County	Missouri	1896	2024	11,578
Dunklin County	Missouri	1996	2024	28,283
Franklin County	Missouri	1996	2024	104,682
Gasconade County	Missouri	1856	2024	14,794
Gentry County	Missouri	1996	2024	6,162
Greene County	Missouri	1964	2024	298,915
Grundy County	Missouri	1996	2024	9,808
Harrison County	Missouri	1992	2024	8,157
Henry County	Missouri	1996	2024	21,946
Hickory County	Missouri	1996	2024	8,279
Holt County	Missouri	1964	2024	4,223
Howard County	Missouri	1996	2024	10,151
Howell County	Missouri	1992	2024	39,750
Iron County	Missouri	2008	2024	9,537
Jackson County	Missouri	2024	1972	717,204
Jasper County	Missouri	1964	2024	122,761
Jefferson County	Missouri	2008	2024	226,739
Johnson County	Missouri	1992	2024	54,013
Knox County	Missouri	1996	2024	3,744
Laclede County	Missouri	1976	2024	36,039
Lafayette County	Missouri	1996	2024	32,984
Lawrence County	Missouri	1964	2024	38,001
Lewis County	Missouri	1996	2024	10,032
Lincoln County	Missouri	1996	2024	59,574
Linn County	Missouri	1996	2024	11,874
Livingston County	Missouri	1996	2024	14,557
Macon County	Missouri	1996	2024	15,209
Madison County	Missouri	1996	2024	12,626
Maries County	Missouri	1992	2024	8,432
Marion County	Missouri	1996	2024	28,525
McDonald County	Missouri	1976	2024	23,303
Mercer County	Missouri	1996	2024	3,538
Miller County	Missouri	1932	2024	24,722
Mississippi County	Missouri	2000	2024	12,577
Moniteau County	Missouri	1948	2024	15,473
Monroe County	Missouri	1996	2024	8,666
Montgomery County	Missouri	1996	2024	11,322
Morgan County	Missouri	1992	2024	21,006
New Madrid County	Missouri	2000	2024	16,434
Newton County	Missouri	1964	2024	58,648
Nodaway County	Missouri	1996	2024	21,241
Oregon County	Missouri	1996	2024	8,635
Osage County	Missouri	1960	2024	13,274
Ozark County	Missouri	1860	2024	8,553
Pemiscot County	Missouri	2000	2024	15,661
Perry County	Missouri	1964	2024	18,956
Pettis County	Missouri	1976	2024	42,980
Phelps County	Missouri	1992	2024	44,638
Pike County	Missouri	1996	2024	17,587
Platte County	Missouri	1992	2024	106,718
Polk County	Missouri	1964	2024	31,519
Pulaski County	Missouri	1992	2024	53,955
Putnam County	Missouri	1860	2024	4,681
Ralls County	Missouri	1996	2024	10,355
Randolph County	Missouri	1996	2024	24,716
Ray County	Missouri	2000	2024	23,158
Reynolds County	Missouri	1996	2024	6,096
Ripley County	Missouri	1996	2024	10,679
Saline County	Missouri	2000	2024	23,333
Schuyler County	Missouri	1996	2024	4,032
Scotland County	Missouri	1996	2024	4,716
Scott County	Missouri	1996	2024	38,059
Shannon County	Missouri	1996	2024	7,031
Shelby County	Missouri	1996	2024	6,103
St. Charles County	Missouri	1964	2024	405,262
St. Clair County	Missouri	1996	2024	9,284
St. Francois County	Missouri	1996	2024	66,922
St. Louis County	Missouri	2024	1988	1,004,125
St. Louis City	Missouri	2024	1924	301,578
Ste. Genevieve County	Missouri	2008	2024	18,479
Stoddard County	Missouri	1992	2024	28,672
Stone County	Missouri	1932	2024	31,076
Sullivan County	Missouri	1996	2024	5,999
Taney County	Missouri	1860	2024	56,066
Texas County	Missouri	1992	2024	24,487
Vernon County	Missouri	1996	2024	19,707
Warren County	Missouri	1992	2024	35,532
Washington County	Missouri	2008	2024	23,514
Wayne County	Missouri	1996	2024	10,974
Webster County	Missouri	1976	2024	39,085
Worth County	Missouri	1996	2024	1,973
Wright County	Missouri	1932	2024	18,188
Beaverhead County	Montana	1936	2024	9,371
Big Horn County	Montana	2020	2024	13,124
Blaine County	Montana	2020	2024	7,044
Broadwater County	Montana	1940	2024	6,774
Carbon County	Montana	1964	2024	10,473
Carter County	Montana	1948	2024	1,415
Cascade County	Montana	2008	2024	84,414
Chouteau County	Montana	1964	2024	5,895
Custer County	Montana	1964	2024	11,867
Daniels County	Montana	1964	2024	1,661
Dawson County	Montana	1996	2024	8,940
Deer Lodge County	Montana	2024	1924	9,421
Fallon County	Montana	1936	2024	3,049
Fergus County	Montana	1964	2024	11,446
Flathead County	Montana	1964	2024	104,357
Gallatin County	Montana	2024	2012	118,960
Garfield County	Montana	1940	2024	1,173
Glacier County	Montana	2024	1984	13,778
Golden Valley County	Montana	1964	2024	823
Granite County	Montana	1964	2024	3,309
Hill County	Montana	2012	2024	16,309
Jefferson County	Montana	1968	2024	12,085
Judith Basin County	Montana	1964	2024	2,023
Lake County	Montana	2008	2024	31,134
Lewis and Clark County	Montana	2008	2024	70,973
Liberty County	Montana	1964	2024	1,959
Lincoln County	Montana	1988	2024	19,677
Madison County	Montana	1940	2024	8,623
McCone County	Montana	1976	2024	1,729
Meagher County	Montana	1940	2024	1,927
Mineral County	Montana	1996	2024	4,535
Missoula County	Montana	2024	2000	117,922
Musselshell County	Montana	1964	2024	4,730
Park County	Montana	1964	2024	17,191
Petroleum County	Montana	1964	2024	496
Phillips County	Montana	1964	2024	4,217
Pondera County	Montana	1964	2024	5,898
Powder River County	Montana	1936	2024	1,694
Powell County	Montana	1964	2024	6,946
Prairie County	Montana	1948	2024	1,088
Ravalli County	Montana	1964	2024	44,174
Richland County	Montana	1964	2024	11,491
Roosevelt County	Montana	2012	2024	10,794
Rosebud County	Montana	2008	2024	8,329
Sanders County	Montana	1992	2024	12,400
Sheridan County	Montana	1996	2024	3,539
Silver Bow County	Montana	2024	1956	35,133
Stillwater County	Montana	1936	2024	8,963
Sweet Grass County	Montana	1936	2024	3,678
Teton County	Montana	1964	2024	6,226
Toole County	Montana	1964	2024	4,971
Treasure County	Montana	1964	2024	762
Valley County	Montana	1992	2024	7,578
Wheatland County	Montana	1964	2024	2,069
Wibaux County	Montana	1976	2024	937
Yellowstone County	Montana	1964	2024	164,731
Adams County	Nebraska	1964	2024	31,205
Antelope County	Nebraska	1932	2024	6,295
Arthur County	Nebraska	1932	2024	434
Banner County	Nebraska	1936	2024	674
Blaine County	Nebraska	1936	2024	431
Boone County	Nebraska	1964	2024	5,379
Box Butte County	Nebraska	1936	2024	10,842
Boyd County	Nebraska	1936	2024	1,810
Brown County	Nebraska	1932	2024	2,903
Buffalo County	Nebraska	1964	2024	50,084
Burt County	Nebraska	1936	2024	6,722
Butler County	Nebraska	1976	2024	8,369
Cass County	Nebraska	1964	2024	26,598
Cedar County	Nebraska	1964	2024	8,380
Chase County	Nebraska	1936	2024	3,893
Cherry County	Nebraska	1936	2024	5,455
Cheyenne County	Nebraska	1936	2024	9,468
Clay County	Nebraska	1964	2024	6,104
Colfax County	Nebraska	1964	2024	10,582
Cuming County	Nebraska	1936	2024	9,013
Custer County	Nebraska	1936	2024	10,545
Dakota County	Nebraska	1996	2024	21,582
Dawes County	Nebraska	1936	2024	8,199
Dawson County	Nebraska	1936	2024	24,111
Deuel County	Nebraska	1936	2024	1,838
Dixon County	Nebraska	1964	2024	5,606
Dodge County	Nebraska	1936	2024	37,167
Douglas County	Nebraska	2024	2012	584,526
Dundy County	Nebraska	1936	2024	1,654
Fillmore County	Nebraska	1964	2024	5,551
Franklin County	Nebraska	1964	2024	2,889
Frontier County	Nebraska	1936	2024	2,519
Furnas County	Nebraska	1932	2024	4,636
Gage County	Nebraska	1964	2024	21,704
Garden County	Nebraska	1932	2024	1,874
Garfield County	Nebraska	1932	2024	1,813
Gosper County	Nebraska	1936	2024	1,893
Grant County	Nebraska	1936	2024	611
Greeley County	Nebraska	1976	2024	2,188
Hall County	Nebraska	1964	2024	62,895
Hamilton County	Nebraska	1932	2024	9,429
Harlan County	Nebraska	1936	2024	3,073
Hayes County	Nebraska	1936	2024	856
Hitchcock County	Nebraska	1936	2024	2,616
Holt County	Nebraska	1936	2024	10,127
Hooker County	Nebraska	1932	2024	711
Howard County	Nebraska	1964	2024	6,475
Jefferson County	Nebraska	1964	2024	7,240
Johnson County	Nebraska	1964	2024	5,290
Kearney County	Nebraska	1964	2024	6,688
Keith County	Nebraska	1936	2024	8,335
Keya Paha County	Nebraska	1916	2024	769
Kimball County	Nebraska	1936	2024	3,434
Knox County	Nebraska	1936	2024	8,391
Lancaster County	Nebraska	2024	2012	322,608
Lincoln County	Nebraska	1964	2024	34,676
Logan County	Nebraska	1964	2024	716
Loup County	Nebraska	1932	2024	607
Madison County	Nebraska	1936	2024	35,585
McPherson County	Nebraska	1932	2024	399
Merrick County	Nebraska	1936	2024	7,668
Morrill County	Nebraska	1936	2024	4,555
Nance County	Nebraska	1964	2024	3,380
Nemaha County	Nebraska	1964	2024	7,074
Nuckolls County	Nebraska	1964	2024	4,095
Otoe County	Nebraska	1932	2024	15,912
Pawnee County	Nebraska	1936	2024	2,544
Perkins County	Nebraska	1936	2024	2,858
Phelps County	Nebraska	1936	2024	8,968
Pierce County	Nebraska	1936	2024	7,317
Platte County	Nebraska	1964	2024	34,296
Polk County	Nebraska	1964	2024	5,214
Red Willow County	Nebraska	1936	2024	10,702
Richardson County	Nebraska	1964	2024	7,871
Rock County	Nebraska	1932	2024	1,262
Saline County	Nebraska	2008	2024	14,292
Sarpy County	Nebraska	1964	2024	190,604
Saunders County	Nebraska	1964	2024	22,278
Scotts Bluff County	Nebraska	1936	2024	36,084
Seward County	Nebraska	1964	2024	17,609
Sheridan County	Nebraska	1936	2024	5,127
Sherman County	Nebraska	1976	2024	2,959
Sioux County	Nebraska	1936	2024	1,135
Stanton County	Nebraska	1936	2024	5,842
Thayer County	Nebraska	1964	2024	5,034
Thomas County	Nebraska	1936	2024	669
Thurston County	Nebraska	2012	2024	6,773
Valley County	Nebraska	1932	2024	4,059
Washington County	Nebraska	1964	2024	20,865
Wayne County	Nebraska	1936	2024	9,697
Webster County	Nebraska	1964	2024	3,395
Wheeler County	Nebraska	1948	2024	774
York County	Nebraska	1932	2024	14,125
Carson City	Nevada	2008	2024	58,639
Churchill County	Nevada	1940	2024	25,516
Clark County	Nevada	2024	1988	2,265,461
Douglas County	Nevada	1936	2024	49,488
Elko County	Nevada	1964	2024	53,702
Esmeralda County	Nevada	1976	2024	729
Eureka County	Nevada	1964	2024	1,855
Humboldt County	Nevada	1964	2024	17,285
Lander County	Nevada	1964	2024	5,734
Lincoln County	Nevada	1964	2024	4,499
Lyon County	Nevada	1940	2024	59,235
Mineral County	Nevada	1996	2024	4,554
Nye County	Nevada	1976	2024	51,591
Pershing County	Nevada	1964	2024	6,650
Storey County	Nevada	1976	2024	4,104
Washoe County	Nevada	2024	2004	486,492
White Pine County	Nevada	1992	2024	9,080
Belknap County	New Hampshire	2008	2024	63,705
Carroll County	New Hampshire	2020	2024	50,107
Cheshire County	New Hampshire	2024	1988	76,458
Coos County	New Hampshire	2012	2024	31,268
Grafton County	New Hampshire	2024	1988	91,118
Hillsborough County	New Hampshire	2024	2016	422,937
Merrimack County	New Hampshire	2024	1988	153,808
Rockingham County	New Hampshire	2020	2024	314,176
Strafford County	New Hampshire	2024	1988	130,889
Sullivan County	New Hampshire	2020	2024	43,063
Atlantic County	New Jersey	2020	2024	274,534
Bergen County	New Jersey	2024	1992	955,732
Burlington County	New Jersey	2024	1988	461,860
Camden County	New Jersey	2024	1988	523,485
Cape May County	New Jersey	1996	2024	95,263
Cumberland County	New Jersey	2020	2024	154,152
Essex County	New Jersey	2024	1972	863,728
Gloucester County	New Jersey	2020	2024	302,294
Hudson County	New Jersey	2024	1984	724,854
Hunterdon County	New Jersey	1964	2024	128,947
Mercer County	New Jersey	2024	1984	387,340
Middlesex County	New Jersey	2024	1988	863,162
Monmouth County	New Jersey	2000	2024	643,615
Morris County	New Jersey	2020	2024	509,285
Ocean County	New Jersey	1996	2024	637,229
Passaic County	New Jersey	2020	2024	524,118
Salem County	New Jersey	2012	2024	64,837
Somerset County	New Jersey	2024	2004	345,361
Sussex County	New Jersey	1964	2024	144,221
Union County	New Jersey	2024	1988	575,345
Warren County	New Jersey	1964	2024	109,632
Bernalillo County	New Mexico	2024	1988	676,444
Catron County	New Mexico	1964	2024	3,579
Chaves County	New Mexico	1964	2024	65,157
Cibola County	New Mexico	2024	1984	27,172
Colfax County	New Mexico	2012	2024	12,387
Curry County	New Mexico	1964	2024	48,430
De Baca County	New Mexico	1996	2024	1,698
Doña Ana County	New Mexico	2024	1988	219,561
Eddy County	New Mexico	1996	2024	62,314
Grant County	New Mexico	2024	1980	28,185
Guadalupe County	New Mexico	2024	1984	4,452
Harding County	New Mexico	1948	2024	657
Hidalgo County	New Mexico	2012	2024	4,178
Lea County	New Mexico	1964	2024	74,455
Lincoln County	New Mexico	1936	2024	20,269
Los Alamos County	New Mexico	2024	2004	19,419
Luna County	New Mexico	2008	2024	25,427
McKinley County	New Mexico	2024	1980	72,902
Mora County	New Mexico	2024	1972	4,189
Otero County	New Mexico	1964	2024	67,839
Quay County	New Mexico	1976	2024	8,746
Rio Arriba County	New Mexico	2024	1956	40,363
Roosevelt County	New Mexico	1964	2024	19,191
San Juan County	New Mexico	1964	2024	121,661
San Miguel County	New Mexico	2024	1956	27,201
Sandoval County	New Mexico	2024	2004	148,834
Santa Fe County	New Mexico	2024	1972	154,823
Sierra County	New Mexico	1996	2024	11,576
Socorro County	New Mexico	2020	2024	16,595
Taos County	New Mexico	2024	1972	34,489
Torrance County	New Mexico	1976	2024	15,045
Union County	New Mexico	1948	2024	4,079
Valencia County	New Mexico	2012	2024	76,205
Albany County	New York	2024	1972	314,848
Allegany County	New York	1964	2024	46,456
Bronx County	New York	2024	1924	1,472,654
Broome County	New York	2024	2016	198,683
Cattaraugus County	New York	1996	2024	77,042
Cayuga County	New York	2012	2024	76,248
Chautauqua County	New York	2008	2024	127,657
Chemung County	New York	1996	2024	84,148
Chenango County	New York	1996	2024	47,220
Clinton County	New York	2020	2024	79,843
Columbia County	New York	2024	1992	61,570
Cortland County	New York	2012	2024	46,809
Delaware County	New York	1996	2024	44,308
Dutchess County	New York	2024	2004	295,911
Erie County	New York	2024	1972	954,236
Essex County	New York	2024	2016	37,381
Franklin County	New York	2012	2024	47,555
Fulton County	New York	1996	2024	53,324
Genesee County	New York	1964	2024	58,388
Greene County	New York	1964	2024	47,931
Hamilton County	New York	1964	2024	5,107
Herkimer County	New York	1996	2024	60,139
Jefferson County	New York	1996	2024	116,721
Kings County	New York	2024	1924	2,736,074
Lewis County	New York	1996	2024	26,582
Livingston County	New York	1964	2024	61,834
Madison County	New York	2012	2024	68,016
Monroe County	New York	2024	1988	759,443
Montgomery County	New York	2000	2024	49,532
Nassau County	New York	2020	2024	1,395,774
New York County	New York	2024	1924	1,694,251
Niagara County	New York	2012	2024	212,666
Oneida County	New York	1996	2024	232,125
Onondaga County	New York	2024	1988	476,516
Ontario County	New York	1996	2024	112,458
Orange County	New York	2012	2024	401,310
Orleans County	New York	1964	2024	40,343
Oswego County	New York	2012	2024	117,525
Otsego County	New York	2012	2024	58,524
Putnam County	New York	1964	2024	97,668
Queens County	New York	2024	1972	2,405,464
Rensselaer County	New York	2024	2016	161,130
Richmond County	New York	2012	2024	495,747
Rockland County	New York	2020	2024	338,329
Saratoga County	New York	2024	2016	235,509
Schenectady County	New York	2024	1984	158,061
Schoharie County	New York	1996	2024	29,714
Schuyler County	New York	1996	2024	17,898
Seneca County	New York	2012	2024	33,814
St. Lawrence County	New York	2012	2024	108,505
Steuben County	New York	1964	2024	93,584
Suffolk County	New York	2012	2024	1,525,920
Sullivan County	New York	2012	2024	78,624
Tioga County	New York	1964	2024	48,455
Tompkins County	New York	2024	1980	105,740
Ulster County	New York	2024	1988	181,851
Warren County	New York	2012	2024	65,737
Washington County	New York	2012	2024	61,302
Wayne County	New York	1964	2024	91,283
Westchester County	New York	2024	1988	1,004,457
Wyoming County	New York	1964	2024	40,531
Yates County	New York	1996	2024	24,774
Alamance County	North Carolina	1976	2024	171,415
Alexander County	North Carolina	1976	2024	36,444
Alleghany County	North Carolina	1992	2024	10,888
Anson County	North Carolina	2020	2024	22,055
Ashe County	North Carolina	1976	2024	26,577
Avery County	North Carolina	Never	2024	17,806
Beaufort County	North Carolina	1976	2024	44,652
Bertie County	North Carolina	2024	1972	17,934
Bladen County	North Carolina	2012	2024	29,606
Brunswick County	North Carolina	1992	2024	136,693
Buncombe County	North Carolina	2024	2004	269,452
Burke County	North Carolina	1976	2024	87,570
Cabarrus County	North Carolina	1948	2024	225,804
Caldwell County	North Carolina	1976	2024	80,652
Camden County	North Carolina	1996	2024	10,355
Carteret County	North Carolina	1976	2024	67,686
Caswell County	North Carolina	2008	2024	22,736
Catawba County	North Carolina	1944	2024	160,610
Chatham County	North Carolina	2024	1984	76,285
Cherokee County	North Carolina	1976	2024	28,774
Chowan County	North Carolina	2000	2024	13,708
Clay County	North Carolina	1976	2024	11,089
Cleveland County	North Carolina	1980	2024	99,519
Columbus County	North Carolina	2000	2024	50,623
Craven County	North Carolina	1976	2024	100,720
Cumberland County	North Carolina	2024	2004	334,728
Currituck County	North Carolina	1980	2024	28,100
Dare County	North Carolina	1976	2024	36,915
Davidson County	North Carolina	1944	2024	168,930
Davie County	North Carolina	1940	2024	42,712
Duplin County	North Carolina	1996	2024	48,715
Durham County	North Carolina	2024	1972	324,833
Edgecombe County	North Carolina	2024	1972	48,900
Forsyth County	North Carolina	2024	2004	382,590
Franklin County	North Carolina	1996	2024	68,573
Gaston County	North Carolina	1976	2024	227,943
Gates County	North Carolina	2012	2024	10,478
Graham County	North Carolina	1976	2024	8,030
Granville County	North Carolina	2012	2024	60,992
Greene County	North Carolina	1992	2024	20,451
Guilford County	North Carolina	2024	2000	541,299
Halifax County	North Carolina	2024	1972	48,622
Harnett County	North Carolina	1980	2024	133,568
Haywood County	North Carolina	1996	2024	62,089
Henderson County	North Carolina	1944	2024	116,281
Hertford County	North Carolina	2024	1972	21,552
Hoke County	North Carolina	2024	1972	52,082
Hyde County	North Carolina	2008	2024	4,589
Iredell County	North Carolina	1976	2024	186,693
Jackson County	North Carolina	2008	2024	43,109
Johnston County	North Carolina	1976	2024	215,999
Jones County	North Carolina	1996	2024	9,172
Lee County	North Carolina	1980	2024	63,285
Lenoir County	North Carolina	1964	2024	55,122
Lincoln County	North Carolina	1976	2024	86,810
Macon County	North Carolina	1976	2024	37,014
Madison County	North Carolina	1996	2024	21,193
Martin County	North Carolina	2012	2024	22,031
McDowell County	North Carolina	1976	2024	44,578
Mecklenburg County	North Carolina	2024	2000	1,115,482
Mitchell County	North Carolina	1876	2024	14,903
Montgomery County	North Carolina	1996	2024	25,751
Moore County	North Carolina	1964	2024	99,727
Nash County	North Carolina	2020	2024	94,970
New Hanover County	North Carolina	2024	2016	225,702
Northampton County	North Carolina	2024	1896	17,471
Onslow County	North Carolina	1976	2024	204,576
Orange County	North Carolina	2024	1928	148,696
Pamlico County	North Carolina	1992	2024	12,276
Pasquotank County	North Carolina	2020	2024	40,568
Pender County	North Carolina	1992	2024	60,203
Perquimans County	North Carolina	1996	2024	13,005
Person County	North Carolina	1980	2024	39,097
Pitt County	North Carolina	2024	2004	170,243
Polk County	North Carolina	1976	2024	19,328
Randolph County	North Carolina	1940	2024	144,171
Richmond County	North Carolina	2012	2024	42,946
Robeson County	North Carolina	2012	2024	116,530
Rockingham County	North Carolina	1992	2024	91,096
Rowan County	North Carolina	1976	2024	146,875
Rutherford County	North Carolina	1976	2024	64,444
Sampson County	North Carolina	1992	2024	59,036
Scotland County	North Carolina	2016	2024	34,174
Stanly County	North Carolina	1976	2024	62,504
Stokes County	North Carolina	1976	2024	44,520
Surry County	North Carolina	1976	2024	71,359
Swain County	North Carolina	1996	2024	14,117
Transylvania County	North Carolina	1976	2024	32,986
Tyrrell County	North Carolina	2000	2024	3,245
Union County	North Carolina	1980	2024	238,267
Vance County	North Carolina	2024	1984	42,578
Wake County	North Carolina	2024	2004	1,129,410
Warren County	North Carolina	2024	1972	18,642
Washington County	North Carolina	2024	1972	11,003
Watauga County	North Carolina	2024	2012	54,086
Wayne County	North Carolina	1964	2024	117,333
Wilkes County	North Carolina	1832	2024	65,969
Wilson County	North Carolina	2024	2004	78,784
Yadkin County	North Carolina	1868	2024	37,214
Yancey County	North Carolina	1992	2024	18,470
Adams County	North Dakota	1976	2024	2,200
Barnes County	North Dakota	1964	2024	10,853
Benson County	North Dakota	2012	2024	5,964
Billings County	North Dakota	1964	2024	945
Bottineau County	North Dakota	1964	2024	6,379
Bowman County	North Dakota	1964	2024	2,993
Burke County	North Dakota	1964	2024	2,201
Burleigh County	North Dakota	1964	2024	98,458
Cass County	North Dakota	2008	2024	184,525
Cavalier County	North Dakota	1976	2024	3,704
Dickey County	North Dakota	1964	2024	4,999
Divide County	North Dakota	1996	2024	2,195
Dunn County	North Dakota	1976	2024	4,095
Eddy County	North Dakota	2008	2024	2,347
Emmons County	North Dakota	1976	2024	3,301
Foster County	North Dakota	1976	2024	3,397
Golden Valley County	North Dakota	1936	2024	1,736
Grand Forks County	North Dakota	2008	2024	73,170
Grant County	North Dakota	1936	2024	2,301
Griggs County	North Dakota	1976	2024	2,306
Hettinger County	North Dakota	1964	2024	2,489
Kidder County	North Dakota	1936	2024	2,394
LaMoure County	North Dakota	1964	2024	4,093
Logan County	North Dakota	1936	2024	1,876
McHenry County	North Dakota	1964	2024	5,345
McIntosh County	North Dakota	1936	2024	2,530
McKenzie County	North Dakota	1964	2024	14,704
McLean County	North Dakota	1976	2024	9,771
Mercer County	North Dakota	1936	2024	8,350
Morton County	North Dakota	1976	2024	33,291
Mountrail County	North Dakota	2008	2024	9,809
Nelson County	North Dakota	2008	2024	3,015
Oliver County	North Dakota	1964	2024	1,877
Pembina County	North Dakota	1964	2024	6,844
Pierce County	North Dakota	1976	2024	3,990
Ramsey County	North Dakota	1996	2024	11,605
Ransom County	North Dakota	2012	2024	5,703
Renville County	North Dakota	1976	2024	2,282
Richland County	North Dakota	1964	2024	16,529
Rolette County	North Dakota	2024	1952	12,187
Sargent County	North Dakota	2012	2024	3,862
Sheridan County	North Dakota	1936	2024	1,265
Sioux County	North Dakota	2024	1980	3,898
Slope County	North Dakota	1964	2024	706
Stark County	North Dakota	1964	2024	33,646
Steele County	North Dakota	2012	2024	1,798
Stutsman County	North Dakota	1964	2024	21,593
Towner County	North Dakota	2008	2024	2,162
Traill County	North Dakota	2008	2024	7,997
Walsh County	North Dakota	1976	2024	10,563
Ward County	North Dakota	1964	2024	69,919
Wells County	North Dakota	1964	2024	3,982
Williams County	North Dakota	1964	2024	40,950
Adams County	Ohio	1976	2024	27,477
Allen County	Ohio	1936	2024	102,206
Ashland County	Ohio	1964	2024	52,447
Ashtabula County	Ohio	2012	2024	97,574
Athens County	Ohio	2024	1984	62,431
Auglaize County	Ohio	1964	2024	46,422
Belmont County	Ohio	2008	2024	66,497
Brown County	Ohio	1976	2024	43,676
Butler County	Ohio	1964	2024	390,357
Carroll County	Ohio	1996	2024	26,721
Champaign County	Ohio	1964	2024	38,714
Clark County	Ohio	2000	2024	136,001
Clermont County	Ohio	1964	2024	208,601
Clinton County	Ohio	1964	2024	42,018
Columbiana County	Ohio	1996	2024	101,877
Coshocton County	Ohio	1992	2024	36,612
Crawford County	Ohio	1964	2024	42,025
Cuyahoga County	Ohio	2024	1972	1,264,817
Darke County	Ohio	1964	2024	51,881
Defiance County	Ohio	1964	2024	38,286
Delaware County	Ohio	1916	2024	214,124
Erie County	Ohio	2012	2024	75,622
Fairfield County	Ohio	1964	2024	158,921
Fayette County	Ohio	1964	2024	28,951
Franklin County	Ohio	2024	1992	1,323,807
Fulton County	Ohio	1932	2024	42,713
Gallia County	Ohio	1996	2024	29,220
Geauga County	Ohio	1964	2024	95,397
Greene County	Ohio	1964	2024	167,966
Guernsey County	Ohio	1996	2024	38,438
Hamilton County	Ohio	2024	2004	830,639
Hancock County	Ohio	1936	2024	74,920
Hardin County	Ohio	1964	2024	30,696
Harrison County	Ohio	1996	2024	14,483
Henry County	Ohio	1964	2024	27,662
Highland County	Ohio	1964	2024	43,317
Hocking County	Ohio	1996	2024	28,050
Holmes County	Ohio	1964	2024	44,223
Huron County	Ohio	1996	2024	58,565
Jackson County	Ohio	1996	2024	32,653
Jefferson County	Ohio	2008	2024	65,249
Knox County	Ohio	1964	2024	62,721
Lake County	Ohio	2008	2024	232,603
Lawrence County	Ohio	1996	2024	58,240
Licking County	Ohio	1964	2024	178,519
Logan County	Ohio	1964	2024	46,150
Lorain County	Ohio	2016	2024	312,964
Lucas County	Ohio	2024	1984	431,279
Madison County	Ohio	1964	2024	43,824
Mahoning County	Ohio	2016	2024	228,614
Marion County	Ohio	1964	2024	65,359
Medina County	Ohio	1964	2024	182,470
Meigs County	Ohio	1996	2024	22,210
Mercer County	Ohio	1968	2024	42,528
Miami County	Ohio	1964	2024	108,774
Monroe County	Ohio	2008	2024	13,385
Montgomery County	Ohio	2024	2016	537,309
Morgan County	Ohio	1964	2024	13,802
Morrow County	Ohio	1964	2024	34,950
Muskingum County	Ohio	1964	2024	86,410
Noble County	Ohio	1996	2024	14,115
Ottawa County	Ohio	2012	2024	40,364
Paulding County	Ohio	1964	2024	18,806
Perry County	Ohio	1996	2024	35,408
Pickaway County	Ohio	1964	2024	58,539
Pike County	Ohio	1996	2024	27,088
Portage County	Ohio	2012	2024	161,791
Preble County	Ohio	1964	2024	40,999
Putnam County	Ohio	1964	2024	34,451
Richland County	Ohio	1964	2024	124,936
Ross County	Ohio	1996	2024	77,093
Sandusky County	Ohio	2012	2024	58,896
Scioto County	Ohio	1996	2024	74,008
Seneca County	Ohio	1996	2024	55,069
Shelby County	Ohio	1964	2024	48,230
Stark County	Ohio	2012	2024	374,853
Summit County	Ohio	2024	1984	540,428
Trumbull County	Ohio	2012	2024	201,977
Tuscarawas County	Ohio	2008	2024	93,263
Union County	Ohio	1932	2024	62,784
Van Wert County	Ohio	1964	2024	28,931
Vinton County	Ohio	1996	2024	12,800
Warren County	Ohio	1964	2024	242,337
Washington County	Ohio	1964	2024	59,771
Wayne County	Ohio	1964	2024	116,894
Williams County	Ohio	1964	2024	37,102
Wood County	Ohio	2012	2024	132,248
Wyandot County	Ohio	1964	2024	21,900
Adair County	Oklahoma	1976	2024	19,495
Alfalfa County	Oklahoma	1936	2024	5,699
Atoka County	Oklahoma	1996	2024	14,143
Beaver County	Oklahoma	1948	2024	5,049
Beckham County	Oklahoma	1992	2024	22,410
Blaine County	Oklahoma	1936	2024	8,735
Bryan County	Oklahoma	1996	2024	46,067
Caddo County	Oklahoma	1996	2024	26,945
Canadian County	Oklahoma	1964	2024	154,405
Carter County	Oklahoma	1996	2024	48,003
Cherokee County	Oklahoma	2000	2024	47,078
Choctaw County	Oklahoma	2000	2024	14,204
Cimarron County	Oklahoma	1976	2024	2,296
Cleveland County	Oklahoma	1964	2024	295,528
Coal County	Oklahoma	1996	2024	5,266
Comanche County	Oklahoma	1964	2024	121,125
Cotton County	Oklahoma	1996	2024	5,527
Craig County	Oklahoma	1996	2024	14,107
Creek County	Oklahoma	1976	2024	71,754
Custer County	Oklahoma	1964	2024	28,513
Delaware County	Oklahoma	1992	2024	40,397
Dewey County	Oklahoma	1976	2024	4,484
Ellis County	Oklahoma	1936	2024	3,749
Garfield County	Oklahoma	1936	2024	62,846
Garvin County	Oklahoma	1996	2024	25,656
Grady County	Oklahoma	1976	2024	54,795
Grant County	Oklahoma	1976	2024	4,169
Greer County	Oklahoma	1996	2024	5,491
Harmon County	Oklahoma	1996	2024	2,488
Harper County	Oklahoma	1948	2024	3,272
Haskell County	Oklahoma	2000	2024	11,561
Hughes County	Oklahoma	2000	2024	13,367
Jackson County	Oklahoma	1976	2024	24,785
Jefferson County	Oklahoma	1996	2024	5,337
Johnston County	Oklahoma	1996	2024	10,272
Kay County	Oklahoma	1948	2024	43,700
Kingfisher County	Oklahoma	1936	2024	15,184
Kiowa County	Oklahoma	1996	2024	8,509
Latimer County	Oklahoma	2000	2024	9,444
Le Flore County	Oklahoma	1996	2024	48,129
Lincoln County	Oklahoma	1976	2024	33,458
Logan County	Oklahoma	1976	2024	49,555
Love County	Oklahoma	1996	2024	10,146
Major County	Oklahoma	1932	2024	7,782
Marshall County	Oklahoma	1996	2024	15,312
Mayes County	Oklahoma	1996	2024	39,046
McClain County	Oklahoma	1976	2024	41,662
McCurtain County	Oklahoma	1996	2024	30,814
McIntosh County	Oklahoma	2000	2024	18,941
Murray County	Oklahoma	1996	2024	13,904
Muskogee County	Oklahoma	2000	2024	66,339
Noble County	Oklahoma	1964	2024	10,924
Nowata County	Oklahoma	1996	2024	9,320
Okfuskee County	Oklahoma	1996	2024	11,310
Oklahoma County	Oklahoma	1964	2024	796,292
Okmulgee County	Oklahoma	2000	2024	36,706
Osage County	Oklahoma	1996	2024	45,818
Ottawa County	Oklahoma	2000	2024	30,285
Pawnee County	Oklahoma	1996	2024	15,553
Payne County	Oklahoma	1964	2024	81,646
Pittsburg County	Oklahoma	1996	2024	43,773
Pontotoc County	Oklahoma	1996	2024	38,065
Pottawatomie County	Oklahoma	1976	2024	72,454
Pushmataha County	Oklahoma	1996	2024	10,812
Roger Mills County	Oklahoma	1976	2024	3,442
Rogers County	Oklahoma	1976	2024	95,240
Seminole County	Oklahoma	1996	2024	23,556
Sequoyah County	Oklahoma	1996	2024	39,281
Stephens County	Oklahoma	1992	2024	42,848
Texas County	Oklahoma	1948	2024	21,384
Tillman County	Oklahoma	1996	2024	6,968
Tulsa County	Oklahoma	1936	2024	669,279
Wagoner County	Oklahoma	1976	2024	80,981
Washington County	Oklahoma	1936	2024	52,455
Washita County	Oklahoma	1992	2024	10,924
Woods County	Oklahoma	1948	2024	8,624
Woodward County	Oklahoma	1936	2024	20,470
Baker County	Oregon	1964	2024	16,668
Benton County	Oregon	2024	1984	95,184
Clackamas County	Oregon	2024	2004	421,401
Clatsop County	Oregon	2024	1956	41,072
Columbia County	Oregon	2012	2024	52,589
Coos County	Oregon	1996	2024	64,929
Crook County	Oregon	1976	2024	24,738
Curry County	Oregon	1992	2024	23,446
Deschutes County	Oregon	2024	2016	198,253
Douglas County	Oregon	1964	2024	111,201
Gilliam County	Oregon	1996	2024	1,995
Grant County	Oregon	1964	2024	7,233
Harney County	Oregon	1964	2024	7,495
Hood River County	Oregon	2024	1984	23,977
Jackson County	Oregon	2008	2024	223,259
Jefferson County	Oregon	1992	2024	24,502
Josephine County	Oregon	1936	2024	88,090
Klamath County	Oregon	1964	2024	69,413
Lake County	Oregon	1964	2024	8,160
Lane County	Oregon	2024	1980	382,971
Lincoln County	Oregon	2024	1984	50,395
Linn County	Oregon	1976	2024	128,610
Malheur County	Oregon	1940	2024	31,571
Marion County	Oregon	2020	2024	345,920
Morrow County	Oregon	1996	2024	12,186
Multnomah County	Oregon	2024	1960	815,428
Polk County	Oregon	1964	2024	87,433
Sherman County	Oregon	1964	2024	1,870
Tillamook County	Oregon	2012	2024	27,390
Umatilla County	Oregon	1964	2024	80,075
Union County	Oregon	1964	2024	26,196
Wallowa County	Oregon	1964	2024	7,391
Wasco County	Oregon	2008	2024	26,670
Washington County	Oregon	2024	1988	600,372
Wheeler County	Oregon	1976	2024	1,451
Yamhill County	Oregon	1964	2024	107,722
Adams County	Pennsylvania	1964	2024	103,852
Allegheny County	Pennsylvania	2024	1972	1,250,578
Armstrong County	Pennsylvania	1996	2024	65,558
Beaver County	Pennsylvania	2004	2024	168,215
Bedford County	Pennsylvania	1964	2024	47,577
Berks County	Pennsylvania	2008	2024	428,849
Blair County	Pennsylvania	1964	2024	122,822
Bradford County	Pennsylvania	1964	2024	59,967
Bucks County	Pennsylvania	2020	2024	646,538
Butler County	Pennsylvania	1964	2024	193,763
Cambria County	Pennsylvania	2008	2024	133,472
Cameron County	Pennsylvania	1964	2024	4,547
Carbon County	Pennsylvania	2008	2024	64,749
Centre County	Pennsylvania	2024	2004	158,172
Chester County	Pennsylvania	2024	2012	534,413
Clarion County	Pennsylvania	1964	2024	37,241
Clearfield County	Pennsylvania	1992	2024	80,562
Clinton County	Pennsylvania	1996	2024	37,450
Columbia County	Pennsylvania	1996	2024	64,727
Crawford County	Pennsylvania	1964	2024	83,938
Cumberland County	Pennsylvania	1964	2024	259,469
Dauphin County	Pennsylvania	2024	2004	286,401
Delaware County	Pennsylvania	2024	1988	576,830
Elk County	Pennsylvania	2008	2024	30,990
Erie County	Pennsylvania	2020	2024	270,876
Fayette County	Pennsylvania	2004	2024	128,804
Forest County	Pennsylvania	1996	2024	6,973
Franklin County	Pennsylvania	1964	2024	155,932
Fulton County	Pennsylvania	1964	2024	14,556
Greene County	Pennsylvania	2000	2024	35,954
Huntingdon County	Pennsylvania	1964	2024	44,092
Indiana County	Pennsylvania	1996	2024	83,246
Jefferson County	Pennsylvania	1964	2024	44,492
Juniata County	Pennsylvania	1964	2024	23,509
Lackawanna County	Pennsylvania	2024	1984	215,896
Lancaster County	Pennsylvania	1964	2024	552,984
Lawrence County	Pennsylvania	2000	2024	86,070
Lebanon County	Pennsylvania	1936	2024	143,257
Lehigh County	Pennsylvania	2024	1988	374,557
Luzerne County	Pennsylvania	2012	2024	325,594
Lycoming County	Pennsylvania	1964	2024	114,188
McKean County	Pennsylvania	1964	2024	40,432
Mercer County	Pennsylvania	2000	2024	110,652
Mifflin County	Pennsylvania	1964	2024	46,143
Monroe County	Pennsylvania	2020	2024	168,327
Montgomery County	Pennsylvania	2024	1988	856,553
Montour County	Pennsylvania	1964	2024	18,136
Northampton County	Pennsylvania	2020	2024	312,951
Northumberland County	Pennsylvania	1964	2024	91,647
Perry County	Pennsylvania	1964	2024	45,842
Philadelphia County	Pennsylvania	2024	1932	1,603,797
Pike County	Pennsylvania	1964	2024	58,535
Potter County	Pennsylvania	1964	2024	16,396
Schuylkill County	Pennsylvania	1996	2024	143,049
Snyder County	Pennsylvania	1856	2024	39,736
Somerset County	Pennsylvania	1964	2024	74,129
Sullivan County	Pennsylvania	1964	2024	5,840
Susquehanna County	Pennsylvania	1964	2024	38,434
Tioga County	Pennsylvania	1964	2024	41,045
Union County	Pennsylvania	1832	2024	42,681
Venango County	Pennsylvania	1964	2024	50,454
Warren County	Pennsylvania	1996	2024	38,587
Washington County	Pennsylvania	2004	2024	209,349
Wayne County	Pennsylvania	1892	2024	51,155
Westmoreland County	Pennsylvania	1996	2024	354,663
Wyoming County	Pennsylvania	1964	2024	26,069
York County	Pennsylvania	1964	2024	456,438
Bristol County	Rhode Island	2024	1984	50,793
Kent County	Rhode Island	2024	2016	170,363
Newport County	Rhode Island	2024	1984	85,643
Providence County	Rhode Island	2024	1972	660,741
Washington County	Rhode Island	2024	1984	129,839
Abbeville County	South Carolina	1996	2024	24,295
Aiken County	South Carolina	1952	2024	168,808
Allendale County	South Carolina	2024	1972	8,039
Anderson County	South Carolina	1980	2024	203,718
Bamberg County	South Carolina	2024	1984	13,311
Barnwell County	South Carolina	2012	2024	20,589
Beaufort County	South Carolina	1976	2024	187,117
Berkeley County	South Carolina	1976	2024	229,861
Calhoun County	South Carolina	2012	2024	14,119
Charleston County	South Carolina	2024	2004	408,235
Cherokee County	South Carolina	1980	2024	56,216
Chester County	South Carolina	2012	2024	32,294
Chesterfield County	South Carolina	1996	2024	43,273
Clarendon County	South Carolina	2016	2024	31,144
Colleton County	South Carolina	2012	2024	38,604
Darlington County	South Carolina	2012	2024	62,905
Dillon County	South Carolina	2016	2024	28,292
Dorchester County	South Carolina	1976	2024	161,540
Edgefield County	South Carolina	1992	2024	25,657
Fairfield County	South Carolina	2024	1972	20,948
Florence County	South Carolina	1976	2024	137,059
Georgetown County	South Carolina	1996	2024	63,404
Greenville County	South Carolina	1956	2024	525,534
Greenwood County	South Carolina	1980	2024	69,351
Hampton County	South Carolina	2024	1972	18,561
Horry County	South Carolina	1976	2024	351,029
Jasper County	South Carolina	2020	2024	28,791
Kershaw County	South Carolina	1976	2024	65,403
Lancaster County	South Carolina	1996	2024	96,016
Laurens County	South Carolina	1980	2024	67,539
Lee County	South Carolina	2024	1972	16,531
Lexington County	South Carolina	1944	2024	293,991
Marion County	South Carolina	2024	1972	29,183
Marlboro County	South Carolina	2024	1972	26,667
McCormick County	South Carolina	2012	2024	9,526
Newberry County	South Carolina	1976	2024	37,719
Oconee County	South Carolina	1980	2024	78,607
Orangeburg County	South Carolina	2024	1972	84,223
Pickens County	South Carolina	1976	2024	131,404
Richland County	South Carolina	2024	1988	416,147
Saluda County	South Carolina	1980	2024	18,862
Spartanburg County	South Carolina	1976	2024	327,997
Sumter County	South Carolina	2024	2000	105,556
Union County	South Carolina	1996	2024	27,244
Williamsburg County	South Carolina	2024	1972	31,026
York County	South Carolina	1980	2024	282,090
Aurora County	South Dakota	1992	2024	2,747
Beadle County	South Dakota	1996	2024	19,149
Bennett County	South Dakota	1964	2024	3,381
Bon Homme County	South Dakota	1996	2024	7,003
Brookings County	South Dakota	2008	2024	34,375
Brown County	South Dakota	2008	2024	38,301
Brule County	South Dakota	1996	2024	5,247
Buffalo County	South Dakota	2024	1984	1,948
Butte County	South Dakota	1932	2024	10,243
Campbell County	South Dakota	1932	2024	1,377
Charles Mix County	South Dakota	1996	2024	9,373
Clark County	South Dakota	1964	2024	3,837
Clay County	South Dakota	2024	1984	14,967
Codington County	South Dakota	1976	2024	28,325
Corson County	South Dakota	2012	2024	3,902
Custer County	South Dakota	1964	2024	8,318
Davison County	South Dakota	1992	2024	19,956
Day County	South Dakota	2012	2024	5,449
Deuel County	South Dakota	1996	2024	4,295
Dewey County	South Dakota	2024	1984	5,239
Douglas County	South Dakota	1936	2024	2,835
Edmunds County	South Dakota	1976	2024	3,986
Fall River County	South Dakota	1936	2024	6,973
Faulk County	South Dakota	1976	2024	2,125
Grant County	South Dakota	1996	2024	7,556
Gregory County	South Dakota	1976	2024	3,994
Haakon County	South Dakota	1936	2024	1,872
Hamlin County	South Dakota	1964	2024	6,164
Hand County	South Dakota	1964	2024	3,145
Hanson County	South Dakota	1992	2024	3,461
Harding County	South Dakota	1936	2024	1,311
Hughes County	South Dakota	1936	2024	17,765
Hutchinson County	South Dakota	1932	2024	7,427
Hyde County	South Dakota	1964	2024	1,262
Jackson County	South Dakota	1964	2024	2,806
Jerauld County	South Dakota	1996	2024	1,663
Jones County	South Dakota	1964	2024	917
Kingsbury County	South Dakota	1996	2024	5,187
Lake County	South Dakota	2008	2024	11,059
Lawrence County	South Dakota	1916	2024	25,768
Lincoln County	South Dakota	1964	2024	65,161
Lyman County	South Dakota	1964	2024	3,718
Marshall County	South Dakota	2012	2024	4,306
McCook County	South Dakota	1976	2024	5,682
McPherson County	South Dakota	1932	2024	2,411
Meade County	South Dakota	1964	2024	29,852
Mellette County	South Dakota	1964	2024	1,918
Miner County	South Dakota	2008	2024	2,298
Minnehaha County	South Dakota	2008	2024	197,214
Moody County	South Dakota	2008	2024	6,336
Oglala Lakota County	South Dakota	2024	1952	13,672
Pennington County	South Dakota	1964	2024	109,222
Perkins County	South Dakota	1936	2024	2,835
Potter County	South Dakota	1964	2024	2,472
Roberts County	South Dakota	2012	2024	10,280
Sanborn County	South Dakota	1996	2024	2,330
Spink County	South Dakota	1992	2024	6,361
Stanley County	South Dakota	1964	2024	2,980
Sully County	South Dakota	1932	2024	1,446
Todd County	South Dakota	2024	1960	9,319
Tripp County	South Dakota	1964	2024	5,624
Turner County	South Dakota	1932	2024	8,673
Union County	South Dakota	1996	2024	16,811
Walworth County	South Dakota	1964	2024	5,315
Yankton County	South Dakota	1964	2024	23,310
Ziebach County	South Dakota	2020	2024	2,413
Anderson County	Tennessee	1996	2024	77,123
Bedford County	Tennessee	2000	2024	50,237
Benton County	Tennessee	2004	2024	15,864
Bledsoe County	Tennessee	1992	2024	14,913
Blount County	Tennessee	1832	2024	135,280
Bradley County	Tennessee	1936	2024	108,620
Campbell County	Tennessee	2000	2024	39,272
Cannon County	Tennessee	2000	2024	14,506
Carroll County	Tennessee	1996	2024	28,440
Carter County	Tennessee	1832	2024	56,356
Cheatham County	Tennessee	1996	2024	41,072
Chester County	Tennessee	1976	2024	17,341
Claiborne County	Tennessee	1992	2024	32,043
Clay County	Tennessee	2004	2024	7,581
Cocke County	Tennessee	1832	2024	35,999
Coffee County	Tennessee	1996	2024	57,889
Crockett County	Tennessee	2000	2024	13,911
Cumberland County	Tennessee	1976	2024	61,145
Davidson County	Tennessee	2024	1988	715,884
Decatur County	Tennessee	2000	2024	11,435
DeKalb County	Tennessee	2000	2024	20,080
Dickson County	Tennessee	2000	2024	54,315
Dyer County	Tennessee	1996	2024	36,801
Fayette County	Tennessee	1996	2024	41,990
Fentress County	Tennessee	1996	2024	18,489
Franklin County	Tennessee	2000	2024	42,774
Gibson County	Tennessee	2000	2024	50,429
Giles County	Tennessee	2000	2024	30,346
Grainger County	Tennessee	1832	2024	23,527
Greene County	Tennessee	1936	2024	70,152
Grundy County	Tennessee	2004	2024	13,529
Hamblen County	Tennessee	1976	2024	64,499
Hamilton County	Tennessee	1948	2024	366,207
Hancock County	Tennessee	1860	2024	6,662
Hardeman County	Tennessee	2012	2024	25,462
Hardin County	Tennessee	1992	2024	26,831
Hawkins County	Tennessee	1912	2024	56,721
Haywood County	Tennessee	2024	1972	17,864
Henderson County	Tennessee	1876	2024	27,842
Henry County	Tennessee	2000	2024	32,199
Hickman County	Tennessee	2000	2024	24,925
Houston County	Tennessee	2008	2024	8,283
Humphreys County	Tennessee	2004	2024	18,990
Jackson County	Tennessee	2008	2024	11,617
Jefferson County	Tennessee	1832	2024	54,683
Johnson County	Tennessee	Never	2024	17,948
Knox County	Tennessee	1940	2024	478,971
Lake County	Tennessee	2004	2024	7,005
Lauderdale County	Tennessee	2004	2024	25,143
Lawrence County	Tennessee	1996	2024	44,159
Lewis County	Tennessee	2000	2024	12,582
Lincoln County	Tennessee	1992	2024	35,319
Loudon County	Tennessee	1976	2024	54,886
Macon County	Tennessee	1992	2024	25,216
Madison County	Tennessee	1976	2024	98,823
Marion County	Tennessee	2000	2024	28,837
Marshall County	Tennessee	2000	2024	34,318
Maury County	Tennessee	1996	2024	100,974
McMinn County	Tennessee	1976	2024	53,276
McNairy County	Tennessee	1996	2024	25,866
Meigs County	Tennessee	1996	2024	12,758
Monroe County	Tennessee	1976	2024	46,250
Montgomery County	Tennessee	1996	2024	220,069
Moore County	Tennessee	1996	2024	6,461
Morgan County	Tennessee	1996	2024	21,035
Obion County	Tennessee	1996	2024	30,787
Overton County	Tennessee	2004	2024	22,511
Perry County	Tennessee	2004	2024	8,366
Pickett County	Tennessee	1992	2024	5,001
Polk County	Tennessee	1996	2024	17,544
Putnam County	Tennessee	1996	2024	79,854
Rhea County	Tennessee	1976	2024	32,870
Roane County	Tennessee	1996	2024	53,404
Robertson County	Tennessee	2000	2024	72,803
Rutherford County	Tennessee	1992	2024	341,486
Scott County	Tennessee	1856	2024	21,850
Sequatchie County	Tennessee	1996	2024	15,826
Sevier County	Tennessee	1832	2024	98,380
Shelby County	Tennessee	2024	1988	929,744
Smith County	Tennessee	2004	2024	19,904
Stewart County	Tennessee	2004	2024	13,657
Sullivan County	Tennessee	1976	2024	158,163
Sumner County	Tennessee	1992	2024	196,281
Tipton County	Tennessee	1980	2024	60,970
Trousdale County	Tennessee	2004	2024	11,615
Unicoi County	Tennessee	Never	2024	17,928
Union County	Tennessee	1996	2024	19,802
Van Buren County	Tennessee	2004	2024	6,168
Warren County	Tennessee	2000	2024	40,953
Washington County	Tennessee	1860	2024	133,001
Wayne County	Tennessee	1876	2024	16,232
Weakley County	Tennessee	1996	2024	32,902
White County	Tennessee	2000	2024	27,351
Williamson County	Tennessee	1976	2024	247,726
Wilson County	Tennessee	1992	2024	147,737
Anderson County	Texas	1976	2024	57,922
Andrews County	Texas	1964	2024	18,610
Angelina County	Texas	1992	2024	86,395
Aransas County	Texas	1976	2024	23,830
Archer County	Texas	1976	2024	8,560
Armstrong County	Texas	1976	2024	1,848
Atascosa County	Texas	1996	2024	48,981
Austin County	Texas	1964	2024	30,167
Bailey County	Texas	1976	2024	6,904
Bandera County	Texas	1964	2024	20,851
Bastrop County	Texas	1996	2024	97,216
Baylor County	Texas	1996	2024	3,465
Bee County	Texas	1996	2024	31,047
Bell County	Texas	1976	2024	370,647
Bexar County	Texas	2024	2004	2,009,324
Blanco County	Texas	1968	2024	11,374
Borden County	Texas	1976	2024	631
Bosque County	Texas	1976	2024	18,235
Bowie County	Texas	1996	2024	92,893
Brazoria County	Texas	1976	2024	372,031
Brazos County	Texas	1964	2024	233,849
Brewster County	Texas	2008	2024	9,546
Briscoe County	Texas	1992	2024	1,435
Brooks County	Texas	2024	Never	7,076
Brown County	Texas	1976	2024	38,095
Burleson County	Texas	1996	2024	17,642
Burnet County	Texas	1976	2024	49,130
Caldwell County	Texas	1996	2024	45,883
Calhoun County	Texas	1988	2024	20,106
Callahan County	Texas	1976	2024	13,708
Cameron County	Texas	2020	2024	421,017
Camp County	Texas	1996	2024	12,464
Carson County	Texas	1976	2024	5,807
Cass County	Texas	1996	2024	28,454
Castro County	Texas	1976	2024	7,371
Chambers County	Texas	1976	2024	46,571
Cherokee County	Texas	1980	2024	50,412
Childress County	Texas	1976	2024	6,664
Clay County	Texas	1992	2024	10,218
Cochran County	Texas	1976	2024	2,547
Coke County	Texas	1980	2024	3,285
Coleman County	Texas	1992	2024	7,684
Collin County	Texas	1964	2024	1,064,465
Collingsworth County	Texas	1976	2024	2,652
Colorado County	Texas	1976	2024	20,557
Comal County	Texas	1964	2024	161,501
Comanche County	Texas	1996	2024	13,594
Concho County	Texas	1992	2024	3,303
Cooke County	Texas	1964	2024	41,668
Coryell County	Texas	1976	2024	83,093
Cottle County	Texas	1996	2024	1,380
Crane County	Texas	1964	2024	4,675
Crockett County	Texas	1992	2024	3,098
Crosby County	Texas	1996	2024	5,133
Culberson County	Texas	2020	2024	2,188
Dallam County	Texas	1976	2024	7,115
Dallas County	Texas	2024	2004	2,613,539
Dawson County	Texas	1964	2024	12,456
Deaf Smith County	Texas	1964	2024	18,583
Delta County	Texas	1996	2024	5,230
Denton County	Texas	1964	2024	906,422
DeWitt County	Texas	1964	2024	19,824
Dickens County	Texas	1996	2024	1,770
Dimmit County	Texas	2024	1972	8,615
Donley County	Texas	1976	2024	3,258
Duval County	Texas	2020	2024	9,831
Eastland County	Texas	1976	2024	17,725
Ector County	Texas	1948	2024	165,171
Edwards County	Texas	1948	2024	1,422
El Paso County	Texas	2024	1984	865,657
Ellis County	Texas	1976	2024	192,455
Erath County	Texas	1980	2024	42,545
Falls County	Texas	1996	2024	16,968
Fannin County	Texas	1996	2024	35,662
Fayette County	Texas	1976	2024	24,435
Fisher County	Texas	1996	2024	3,672
Floyd County	Texas	1976	2024	5,402
Foard County	Texas	1996	2024	1,095
Fort Bend County	Texas	2024	2012	822,779
Franklin County	Texas	1992	2024	10,359
Freestone County	Texas	1992	2024	19,435
Frio County	Texas	2016	2024	18,385
Gaines County	Texas	1976	2024	21,598
Galveston County	Texas	1996	2024	350,682
Garza County	Texas	1976	2024	5,816
Gillespie County	Texas	1964	2024	26,725
Glasscock County	Texas	1960	2024	1,116
Goliad County	Texas	1976	2024	7,012
Gonzales County	Texas	1976	2024	19,653
Gray County	Texas	1948	2024	21,227
Grayson County	Texas	1976	2024	135,543
Gregg County	Texas	1948	2024	124,239
Grimes County	Texas	1996	2024	29,268
Guadalupe County	Texas	1964	2024	172,706
Hale County	Texas	1976	2024	32,522
Hall County	Texas	1996	2024	2,825
Hamilton County	Texas	1976	2024	8,222
Hansford County	Texas	1948	2024	5,285
Hardeman County	Texas	1996	2024	3,549
Hardin County	Texas	1992	2024	56,231
Harris County	Texas	2024	2004	4,731,145
Harrison County	Texas	1996	2024	68,839
Hartley County	Texas	1964	2024	5,382
Haskell County	Texas	1996	2024	5,416
Hays County	Texas	2024	2016	241,067
Hemphill County	Texas	1964	2024	3,382
Henderson County	Texas	1992	2024	82,150
Hidalgo County	Texas	2020	2024	870,781
Hill County	Texas	1992	2024	35,874
Hockley County	Texas	1976	2024	21,537
Hood County	Texas	1976	2024	61,598
Hopkins County	Texas	1996	2024	36,787
Houston County	Texas	1992	2024	22,066
Howard County	Texas	1976	2024	34,860
Hudspeth County	Texas	1996	2024	3,202
Hunt County	Texas	1976	2024	99,956
Hutchinson County	Texas	1948	2024	20,617
Irion County	Texas	1964	2024	1,513
Jack County	Texas	1992	2024	8,472
Jackson County	Texas	1976	2024	14,988
Jasper County	Texas	1996	2024	32,980
Jeff Davis County	Texas	1976	2024	1,996
Jefferson County	Texas	2012	2024	256,526
Jim Hogg County	Texas	2024	Never	4,838
Jim Wells County	Texas	2016	2024	38,891
Johnson County	Texas	1976	2024	179,927
Jones County	Texas	1996	2024	19,663
Karnes County	Texas	1996	2024	14,710
Kaufman County	Texas	1980	2024	145,310
Kendall County	Texas	1932	2024	44,279
Kenedy County	Texas	2016	2024	350
Kent County	Texas	1996	2024	753
Kerr County	Texas	1964	2024	52,598
Kimble County	Texas	1964	2024	4,286
King County	Texas	1976	2024	265
Kinney County	Texas	1976	2024	3,129
Kleberg County	Texas	2016	2024	31,040
Knox County	Texas	1996	2024	3,353
La Salle County	Texas	2016	2024	6,664
Lamar County	Texas	1992	2024	50,088
Lamb County	Texas	1976	2024	13,045
Lampasas County	Texas	1976	2024	21,627
Lavaca County	Texas	1976	2024	20,337
Lee County	Texas	1988	2024	17,478
Leon County	Texas	1980	2024	15,719
Liberty County	Texas	1992	2024	91,628
Limestone County	Texas	1996	2024	22,146
Lipscomb County	Texas	1948	2024	3,059
Live Oak County	Texas	1976	2024	11,335
Llano County	Texas	1976	2024	21,243
Loving County	Texas	1964	2024	64
Lubbock County	Texas	1964	2024	310,639
Lynn County	Texas	1976	2024	5,596
Madison County	Texas	1992	2024	13,455
Marion County	Texas	1996	2024	9,725
Martin County	Texas	1976	2024	5,237
Mason County	Texas	1976	2024	3,953
Matagorda County	Texas	1976	2024	36,255
Maverick County	Texas	2020	2024	57,887
McCulloch County	Texas	1992	2024	7,630
McLennan County	Texas	1976	2024	260,579
McMullen County	Texas	1964	2024	600
Medina County	Texas	1976	2024	50,748
Menard County	Texas	1996	2024	1,962
Midland County	Texas	1948	2024	169,983
Milam County	Texas	1996	2024	24,754
Mills County	Texas	1992	2024	4,456
Mitchell County	Texas	1996	2024	8,990
Montague County	Texas	1992	2024	19,965
Montgomery County	Texas	1964	2024	620,443
Moore County	Texas	1976	2024	21,358
Morris County	Texas	2000	2024	11,973
Motley County	Texas	1976	2024	1,063
Nacogdoches County	Texas	1968	2024	64,653
Navarro County	Texas	1996	2024	52,624
Newton County	Texas	2000	2024	12,217
Nolan County	Texas	1996	2024	14,738
Nueces County	Texas	1996	2024	353,178
Ochiltree County	Texas	1948	2024	10,015
Oldham County	Texas	1976	2024	1,758
Orange County	Texas	1996	2024	84,808
Palo Pinto County	Texas	1996	2024	28,409
Panola County	Texas	1996	2024	22,491
Parker County	Texas	1976	2024	148,222
Parmer County	Texas	1976	2024	9,869
Pecos County	Texas	1996	2024	15,193
Polk County	Texas	1992	2024	50,123
Potter County	Texas	1964	2024	118,525
Presidio County	Texas	2024	1972	6,131
Rains County	Texas	1996	2024	12,164
Randall County	Texas	1948	2024	140,753
Reagan County	Texas	1964	2024	3,385
Real County	Texas	1976	2024	2,758
Red River County	Texas	1996	2024	11,587
Reeves County	Texas	2016	2024	14,748
Refugio County	Texas	1996	2024	6,741
Roberts County	Texas	1948	2024	827
Robertson County	Texas	2000	2024	16,757
Rockwall County	Texas	1968	2024	107,819
Runnels County	Texas	1964	2024	9,900
Rusk County	Texas	1964	2024	107,819
Sabine County	Texas	1996	2024	9,894
San Augustine County	Texas	1996	2024	7,918
San Jacinto County	Texas	1992	2024	27,402
San Patricio County	Texas	1996	2024	68,755
San Saba County	Texas	1988	2024	5,730
Schleicher County	Texas	1964	2024	2,451
Scurry County	Texas	1968	2024	16,932
Shackelford County	Texas	1976	2024	3,105
Shelby County	Texas	1996	2024	24,022
Sherman County	Texas	1976	2024	2,782
Smith County	Texas	1948	2024	233,479
Somervell County	Texas	1980	2024	9,205
Starr County	Texas	2020	2024	65,920
Stephens County	Texas	1976	2024	9,101
Sterling County	Texas	1964	2024	1,372
Stonewall County	Texas	1996	2024	1,245
Sutton County	Texas	1964	2024	3,372
Swisher County	Texas	1996	2024	6,971
Tarrant County	Texas	2020	2024	2,110,640
Taylor County	Texas	1964	2024	143,208
Terrell County	Texas	1996	2024	760
Terry County	Texas	1976	2024	11,831
Throckmorton County	Texas	1992	2024	1,440
Titus County	Texas	1996	2024	31,247
Tom Green County	Texas	1964	2024	120,003
Travis County	Texas	2024	2000	1,290,188
Trinity County	Texas	1996	2024	13,602
Tyler County	Texas	1996	2024	19,798
Upshur County	Texas	1992	2024	40,892
Upton County	Texas	1964	2024	3,308
Uvalde County	Texas	1964	2024	24,564
Val Verde County	Texas	2016	2024	47,586
Van Zandt County	Texas	1980	2024	59,541
Victoria County	Texas	1964	2024	91,319
Walker County	Texas	1976	2024	76,400
Waller County	Texas	1996	2024	56,794
Ward County	Texas	1996	2024	11,644
Washington County	Texas	1964	2024	35,805
Webb County	Texas	2020	2024	267,114
Wharton County	Texas	1976	2024	41,570
Wheeler County	Texas	1976	2024	4,990
Wichita County	Texas	1976	2024	129,350
Wilbarger County	Texas	1976	2024	12,887
Willacy County	Texas	2020	2024	20,164
Williamson County	Texas	2020	2024	609,017
Wilson County	Texas	1976	2024	49,753
Winkler County	Texas	1964	2024	7,791
Wise County	Texas	1980	2024	68,632
Wood County	Texas	1976	2024	44,843
Yoakum County	Texas	1964	2024	7,694
Young County	Texas	1976	2024	17,867
Zapata County	Texas	2016	2024	13,889
Zavala County	Texas	2024	1972	9,670
Beaver County	Utah	1964	2024	7,072
Box Elder County	Utah	1944	2024	57,666
Cache County	Utah	1944	2024	133,154
Carbon County	Utah	1996	2024	20,412
Daggett County	Utah	1964	2024	935
Davis County	Utah	1948	2024	362,679
Duchesne County	Utah	1964	2024	19,596
Emery County	Utah	1976	2024	9,825
Garfield County	Utah	1936	2024	5,083
Grand County	Utah	2024	2016	9,669
Iron County	Utah	1936	2024	57,289
Juab County	Utah	1964	2024	11,786
Kane County	Utah	1916	2024	7,667
Millard County	Utah	1944	2024	12,975
Morgan County	Utah	1964	2024	12,295
Piute County	Utah	1940	2024	1,438
Rich County	Utah	1944	2024	2,510
Salt Lake County	Utah	2024	2012	1,185,238
San Juan County	Utah	1936	2024	14,518
Sanpete County	Utah	1936	2024	28,437
Sevier County	Utah	1936	2024	21,522
Summit County	Utah	2024	2012	42,357
Tooele County	Utah	1996	2024	72,698
Uintah County	Utah	1948	2024	35,620
Utah County	Utah	1964	2024	659,399
Wasatch County	Utah	1964	2024	34,788
Washington County	Utah	1944	2024	180,279
Wayne County	Utah	1964	2024	2,486
Weber County	Utah	1964	2024	262,223
Addison County	Vermont	2024	1984	37,363
Bennington County	Vermont	2024	1988	37,347
Caledonia County	Vermont	2024	2000	30,233
Chittenden County	Vermont	2024	1984	168,323
Essex County	Vermont	2012	2024	5,920
Franklin County	Vermont	2024	1984	49,946
Grand Isle County	Vermont	2024	1984	7,293
Lamoille County	Vermont	2024	1988	25,945
Orange County	Vermont	2024	2000	29,277
Orleans County	Vermont	2020	2024	27,393
Rutland County	Vermont	2024	1988	60,572
Washington County	Vermont	2024	1988	59,807
Windham County	Vermont	2024	1984	45,905
Windsor County	Vermont	2024	1988	57,753
Accomack County	Virginia	1996	2024	33,413
Albemarle County	Virginia	2024	2000	112,395
Alexandria	Virginia	2024	1980	159,467
Alleghany County	Virginia	1996	2024	15,223
Amelia County	Virginia	1976	2024	13,265
Amherst County	Virginia	1964	2024	31,307
Appomattox County	Virginia	1960	2024	16,119
Arlington County	Virginia	2024	1980	238,643
Augusta County	Virginia	1944	2024	77,487
Bath County	Virginia	1996	2024	4,209
Bedford County	Virginia	1976	2024	79,462
Bland County	Virginia	1964	2024	6,270
Botetourt County	Virginia	1976	2024	33,596
Bristol	Virginia	1976	2024	17,219
Brunswick County	Virginia	2024	1972	15,849
Buchanan County	Virginia	2004	2024	20,355
Buckingham County	Virginia	2012	2024	16,824
Buena Vista	Virginia	1996	2024	6,641
Campbell County	Virginia	1960	2024	55,696
Caroline County	Virginia	2012	2024	30,887
Carroll County	Virginia	1932	2024	29,155
Charles City County	Virginia	2024	1956	6,773
Charlotte County	Virginia	1976	2024	11,529
Charlottesville	Virginia	2024	1972	46,553
Chesapeake	Virginia	2024	2016	249,422
Chesterfield County	Virginia	2024	2016	364,548
Clarke County	Virginia	1964	2024	14,783
Colonial Heights	Virginia	Never	2024	18,170
Covington	Virginia	2012	2024	5,737
Craig County	Virginia	1980	2024	4,892
Culpeper County	Virginia	1964	2024	52,552
Cumberland County	Virginia	1976	2024	9,675
Danville	Virginia	2024	2000	42,590
Dickenson County	Virginia	2004	2024	14,124
Dinwiddie County	Virginia	1996	2024	27,947
Emporia	Virginia	2024	1992	5,766
Essex County	Virginia	2012	2024	10,599
Fairfax County	Virginia	2024	2000	1,150,309
Fairfax	Virginia	2024	2000	24,146
Falls Church	Virginia	2024	1984	14,658
Fauquier County	Virginia	1964	2024	72,972
Floyd County	Virginia	1880	2024	15,476
Fluvanna County	Virginia	1976	2024	27,249
Franklin County	Virginia	1980	2024	54,477
Franklin	Virginia	2024	1984	8,180
Frederick County	Virginia	1964	2024	91,419
Fredericksburg	Virginia	2024	1988	27,982
Galax	Virginia	1996	2024	6,720
Giles County	Virginia	1996	2024	16,787
Gloucester County	Virginia	1976	2024	38,711
Goochland County	Virginia	1976	2024	24,727
Grayson County	Virginia	1976	2024	15,333
Greene County	Virginia	1940	2024	20,552
Greensville County	Virginia	2024	1972	11,391
Halifax County	Virginia	1976	2024	34,022
Hampton	Virginia	2024	1988	137,148
Hanover County	Virginia	1948	2024	109,979
Harrisonburg	Virginia	2024	2004	51,814
Henrico County	Virginia	2024	2004	334,389
Henry County	Virginia	1992	2024	50,948
Highland County	Virginia	1932	2024	2,232
Hopewell	Virginia	2024	2004	23,033
Isle of Wight County	Virginia	1980	2024	38,606
James City County	Virginia	2024	2016	78,254
King and Queen County	Virginia	2008	2024	6,608
King George County	Virginia	1976	2024	26,723
King William County	Virginia	1948	2024	17,810
Lancaster County	Virginia	1948	2024	10,919
Lee County	Virginia	1996	2024	22,173
Lexington	Virginia	2024	1984	7,320
Loudoun County	Virginia	2024	2004	420,959
Louisa County	Virginia	1980	2024	37,596
Lunenburg County	Virginia	1960	2024	11,936
Lynchburg	Virginia	2020	2024	79,009
Madison County	Virginia	1940	2024	13,837
Manassas Park	Virginia	2024	2004	42,772
Manassas	Virginia	2024	2004	17,219
Martinsville	Virginia	2024	1988	13,485
Mathews County	Virginia	1944	2024	8,533
Mecklenburg County	Virginia	1960	2024	30,319
Middlesex County	Virginia	1948	2024	10,625
Montgomery County	Virginia	2024	2012	99,721
Nelson County	Virginia	2012	2024	14,775
New Kent County	Virginia	1976	2024	22,945
Newport News	Virginia	2024	1992	186,247
Norfolk	Virginia	2024	1972	238,005
Northampton County	Virginia	2024	1988	12,282
Northumberland County	Virginia	1944	2024	11,839
Norton	Virginia	2000	2024	3,687
Nottoway County	Virginia	1976	2024	15,642
Orange County	Virginia	1948	2024	36,254
Page County	Virginia	1936	2024	23,709
Patrick County	Virginia	1976	2024	17,608
Petersburg	Virginia	2024	1972	33,458
Pittsylvania County	Virginia	1960	2024	60,501
Poquoson	Virginia	Never	2024	12,460
Portsmouth	Virginia	2024	1972	97,915
Powhatan County	Virginia	1968	2024	30,333
Prince Edward County	Virginia	2020	2024	21,849
Prince George County	Virginia	1976	2024	43,010
Prince William County	Virginia	2024	2004	482,204
Pulaski County	Virginia	1980	2024	33,800
Radford	Virginia	2024	2004	16,070
Rappahannock County	Virginia	1976	2024	7,348
Richmond County	Virginia	1944	2024	8,923
Richmond City	Virginia	2024	1972	226,610
Roanoke County	Virginia	1944	2024	96,929
Roanoke	Virginia	2024	1984	100,011
Rockbridge County	Virginia	1976	2024	22,650
Rockingham County	Virginia	1964	2024	83,757
Russell County	Virginia	2000	2024	25,781
Salem	Virginia	1976	2024	25,346
Scott County	Virginia	1976	2024	21,576
Shenandoah County	Virginia	1932	2024	44,186
Smyth County	Virginia	1996	2024	29,800
Southampton County	Virginia	2000	2024	17,996
Spotsylvania County	Virginia	1976	2024	140,032
Stafford County	Virginia	2024	2016	156,927
Staunton	Virginia	2024	2004	25,750
Suffolk	Virginia	2024	2004	94,324
Surry County	Virginia	2020	2024	6,561
Sussex County	Virginia	2024	1972	10,829
Tazewell County	Virginia	1996	2024	40,429
Virginia Beach	Virginia	2024	2016	459,470
Warren County	Virginia	1976	2024	40,727
Washington County	Virginia	1964	2024	53,935
Waynesboro	Virginia	1964	2024	22,196
Westmoreland County	Virginia	2012	2024	18,477
Williamsburg	Virginia	2024	2000	15,425
Winchester	Virginia	2024	2004	28,120
Wise County	Virginia	1996	2024	36,130
Wythe County	Virginia	1940	2024	28,290
York County	Virginia	1964	2024	70,045
Adams County	Washington	1936	2024	20,613
Asotin County	Washington	1996	2024	22,285
Benton County	Washington	1964	2024	206,873
Chelan County	Washington	1964	2024	79,074
Clallam County	Washington	2024	2016	77,155
Clark County	Washington	2024	2004	503,311
Columbia County	Washington	1964	2024	3,952
Cowlitz County	Washington	2012	2024	110,730
Douglas County	Washington	1964	2024	42,938
Ferry County	Washington	1996	2024	7,178
Franklin County	Washington	1964	2024	96,749
Garfield County	Washington	1964	2024	2,286
Grant County	Washington	1964	2024	99,123
Grays Harbor County	Washington	2012	2024	75,636
Island County	Washington	2024	2004	86,857
Jefferson County	Washington	2024	1980	32,977
King County	Washington	2024	1984	2,269,675
Kitsap County	Washington	2024	1988	275,611
Kittitas County	Washington	1996	2024	44,337
Klickitat County	Washington	2008	2024	22,735
Lewis County	Washington	1964	2024	82,149
Lincoln County	Washington	1948	2024	10,876
Mason County	Washington	2012	2024	65,726
Okanogan County	Washington	1992	2024	42,104
Pacific County	Washington	2012	2024	23,365
Pend Oreille County	Washington	1996	2024	13,401
Pierce County	Washington	2024	1984	921,130
San Juan County	Washington	2024	1984	17,788
Skagit County	Washington	2024	2004	129,523
Skamania County	Washington	2008	2024	12,036
Snohomish County	Washington	2024	1988	827,957
Spokane County	Washington	1996	2024	539,339
Stevens County	Washington	1964	2024	46,445
Thurston County	Washington	2024	1984	294,793
Wahkiakum County	Washington	2008	2024	4,422
Walla Walla County	Washington	1964	2024	62,584
Whatcom County	Washington	2024	2000	226,847
Whitman County	Washington	2024	2012	47,973
Yakima County	Washington	1964	2024	256,728
Barbour County	West Virginia	1996	2024	15,465
Berkeley County	West Virginia	1964	2024	122,076
Boone County	West Virginia	2008	2024	21,809
Braxton County	West Virginia	2008	2024	12,447
Brooke County	West Virginia	2004	2024	22,559
Cabell County	West Virginia	1996	2024	94,350
Calhoun County	West Virginia	1996	2024	6,229
Clay County	West Virginia	1996	2024	8,051
Doddridge County	West Virginia	1964	2024	7,808
Fayette County	West Virginia	2004	2024	40,488
Gilmer County	West Virginia	1996	2024	7,408
Grant County	West Virginia	Never	2024	10,976
Greenbrier County	West Virginia	1996	2024	32,977
Hampshire County	West Virginia	1976	2024	23,093
Hancock County	West Virginia	1996	2024	29,095
Hardy County	West Virginia	1996	2024	14,299
Harrison County	West Virginia	2000	2024	65,921
Jackson County	West Virginia	1996	2024	27,791
Jefferson County	West Virginia	2008	2024	57,701
Kanawha County	West Virginia	2000	2024	180,745
Lewis County	West Virginia	1996	2024	17,033
Lincoln County	West Virginia	2000	2024	20,463
Logan County	West Virginia	2004	2024	32,567
Marion County	West Virginia	2008	2024	56,205
Marshall County	West Virginia	1996	2024	30,591
Mason County	West Virginia	1996	2024	25,453
McDowell County	West Virginia	2008	2024	19,111
Mercer County	West Virginia	1996	2024	59,664
Mineral County	West Virginia	1976	2024	26,938
Mingo County	West Virginia	2004	2024	23,568
Monongalia County	West Virginia	2008	2024	105,822
Monroe County	West Virginia	1996	2024	12,376
Morgan County	West Virginia	1848	2024	17,063
Nicholas County	West Virginia	1996	2024	24,604
Ohio County	West Virginia	1996	2024	42,425
Pendleton County	West Virginia	1996	2024	6,143
Pleasants County	West Virginia	1996	2024	7,653
Pocahontas County	West Virginia	1996	2024	7,869
Preston County	West Virginia	1964	2024	34,216
Putnam County	West Virginia	1976	2024	57,440
Raleigh County	West Virginia	1996	2024	74,591
Randolph County	West Virginia	1996	2024	27,932
Ritchie County	West Virginia	1912	2024	8,444
Roane County	West Virginia	1996	2024	14,028
Summers County	West Virginia	1996	2024	11,959
Taylor County	West Virginia	1996	2024	16,705
Tucker County	West Virginia	1996	2024	6,762
Tyler County	West Virginia	1996	2024	8,313
Upshur County	West Virginia	1964	2024	23,816
Wayne County	West Virginia	1996	2024	38,982
Webster County	West Virginia	2008	2024	8,378
Wetzel County	West Virginia	1996	2024	14,442
Wirt County	West Virginia	1992	2024	5,194
Wood County	West Virginia	1964	2024	84,296
Wyoming County	West Virginia	2000	2024	21,382
Adams County	Wisconsin	2012	2024	20,654
Ashland County	Wisconsin	2024	1956	16,027
Barron County	Wisconsin	2008	2024	46,711
Bayfield County	Wisconsin	2024	1972	16,220
Brown County	Wisconsin	2008	2024	268,740
Buffalo County	Wisconsin	2012	2024	13,317
Burnett County	Wisconsin	2008	2024	16,526
Calumet County	Wisconsin	2008	2024	52,442
Chippewa County	Wisconsin	2008	2024	66,297
Clark County	Wisconsin	2008	2024	34,659
Columbia County	Wisconsin	2012	2024	58,490
Crawford County	Wisconsin	2012	2024	16,113
Dane County	Wisconsin	2024	1956	561,504
Dodge County	Wisconsin	1964	2024	89,396
Door County	Wisconsin	2024	2016	30,066
Douglas County	Wisconsin	2024	1928	44,295
Dunn County	Wisconsin	2012	2024	45,440
Eau Claire County	Wisconsin	2024	1984	105,710
Florence County	Wisconsin	1992	2024	4,558
Fond du Lac County	Wisconsin	1964	2024	104,154
Forest County	Wisconsin	2012	2024	9,179
Grant County	Wisconsin	2012	2024	51,938
Green County	Wisconsin	2024	1988	37,093
Green Lake County	Wisconsin	1964	2024	19,018
Iowa County	Wisconsin	2024	1984	23,709
Iron County	Wisconsin	2008	2024	6,137
Jackson County	Wisconsin	2012	2024	21,145
Jefferson County	Wisconsin	2008	2024	84,900
Juneau County	Wisconsin	2012	2024	26,718
Kenosha County	Wisconsin	2012	2024	169,151
Kewaunee County	Wisconsin	2008	2024	20,563
La Crosse County	Wisconsin	2024	1984	120,784
Lafayette County	Wisconsin	2012	2024	16,611
Langlade County	Wisconsin	2008	2024	19,491
Lincoln County	Wisconsin	2012	2024	28,415
Manitowoc County	Wisconsin	2008	2024	81,359
Marathon County	Wisconsin	2008	2024	138,013
Marinette County	Wisconsin	2008	2024	41,872
Marquette County	Wisconsin	2012	2024	15,592
Menominee County	Wisconsin	2024	Never	4,255
Milwaukee County	Wisconsin	2024	1956	939,489
Monroe County	Wisconsin	2008	2024	46,274
Oconto County	Wisconsin	2008	2024	38,965
Oneida County	Wisconsin	2008	2024	37,845
Outagamie County	Wisconsin	2008	2024	190,705
Ozaukee County	Wisconsin	1964	2024	91,503
Pepin County	Wisconsin	2012	2024	7,318
Pierce County	Wisconsin	2008	2024	42,212
Polk County	Wisconsin	1996	2024	44,977
Portage County	Wisconsin	2024	1956	70,377
Price County	Wisconsin	2012	2024	14,054
Racine County	Wisconsin	2012	2024	197,727
Richland County	Wisconsin	2012	2024	17,304
Rock County	Wisconsin	2024	1984	163,687
Rusk County	Wisconsin	2008	2024	14,188
Sauk County	Wisconsin	2020	2024	65,763
Sawyer County	Wisconsin	2012	2024	18,074
Shawano County	Wisconsin	2008	2024	40,881
Sheboygan County	Wisconsin	1996	2024	118,034
St. Croix County	Wisconsin	1996	2024	93,536
Taylor County	Wisconsin	1996	2024	19,913
Trempealeau County	Wisconsin	2012	2024	30,760
Vernon County	Wisconsin	2012	2024	30,714
Vilas County	Wisconsin	1964	2024	23,047
Walworth County	Wisconsin	1912	2024	106,478
Washburn County	Wisconsin	2008	2024	16,623
Washington County	Wisconsin	1964	2024	136,761
Waukesha County	Wisconsin	1964	2024	406,978
Waupaca County	Wisconsin	2008	2024	51,812
Waushara County	Wisconsin	2008	2024	24,520
Winnebago County	Wisconsin	2012	2024	171,730
Wood County	Wisconsin	2008	2024	74,207
Albany County	Wyoming	2020	2024	37,066
Big Horn County	Wyoming	1964	2024	11,521
Campbell County	Wyoming	1936	2024	47,026
Carbon County	Wyoming	1992	2024	14,537
Converse County	Wyoming	1936	2024	13,751
Crook County	Wyoming	1932	2024	7,181
Fremont County	Wyoming	1964	2024	39,234
Goshen County	Wyoming	1964	2024	12,498
Hot Springs County	Wyoming	1964	2024	4,621
Johnson County	Wyoming	1932	2024	8,447
Laramie County	Wyoming	1964	2024	100,512
Lincoln County	Wyoming	1964	2024	19,581
Natrona County	Wyoming	1992	2024	79,955
Niobrara County	Wyoming	1936	2024	2,467
Park County	Wyoming	1964	2024	29,624
Platte County	Wyoming	1964	2024	8,605
Sheridan County	Wyoming	1964	2024	30,921
Sublette County	Wyoming	1936	2024	8,728
Sweetwater County	Wyoming	1996	2024	42,272
Teton County	Wyoming	2024	2000	23,331
Uinta County	Wyoming	1964	2024	20,450
Washakie County	Wyoming	1936	2024	7,685
Weston County	Wyoming	1936	2024	6,838

== See also ==
- List of election bellwether counties in the United States
