= Senator Saulsbury =

Senator Saulsbury may refer to:

- Eli Saulsbury (1817–1893), U.S. Senator from Delaware
- Gove Saulsbury (1815–1881), Delaware State Senate
- Willard Saulsbury Jr. (1861–1927), U.S. Senator from Delaware
- Willard Saulsbury Sr. (1820–1893), U.S. Senator from Delaware
