= 1874 Delaware gubernatorial election =

- November 8, 1874
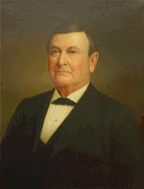

Nominee	John P. Cochran	Isaac Jump
Party	Democratic	Republican
Popular vote	12,488	11,259
Percentage	52.59%	47.41%
- County results Cochran: 50–60%
Governor before election
James Ponder
Democratic
Elected Governor
John P. Cochran
Democratic

The 1874 Delaware gubernatorial election was held on November 3, 1874. Incumbent Democratic Governor James Ponder was unable to seek re-election. Former county judge John P. Cochran ran as the Democratic nominee to succeed Ponder and faced the Republican nominee, Dr. Isaac Jump. Cochran ultimately defeated Jump, but by a significantly reduced margin from 1870.

== General election ==
=== Results ===
1874 Delaware gubernatorial election
Party	Candidate	Votes	%	±%
Democratic	John P. Cochran	12,488	52.59%	−3.03%
Republican	Isaac Jump	11,259	47.41%	+3.03%
Majority		1,229	5.18%	−6.06%
Turnout		23,747	100.00%	
Democratic hold				

== Bibliography ==
- Gubernatorial Elections, 1787-1997. Washington, D.C.: Congressional Quarterly Inc. 1998. ISBN 1-56802-396-0.
- Glashan, Roy R. (1979). American Governors and Gubernatorial Elections, 1775-1978. Meckler Books. ISBN 0-930466-17-9.
- Dubin, Michael J. (2003). United States Gubernatorial Elections, 1776-1860: The Official Results by State and County. Jefferson, North Carolina: McFarland. ISBN 978-0-7864-1439-0.
- Delaware House Journal, 75th General Assembly, 1st Reg. Sess. (1875).
