= 73rd Delaware General Assembly =

American legislative session

←	72nd	74th	→

Overview
- Legislative body: Delaware General Assembly
- Term: January 3, 1865 – January 1, 1867

The 73rd Delaware General Assembly was a meeting of the legislative branch of the state government, consisting of the Delaware Senate and the Delaware House of Representatives. Elections were held the first Tuesday after November 1 and terms began on the first Tuesday in January. It met in Dover, convening January 3, 1865, two weeks before the beginning of the third and fourth year of the administration of Governor William Cannon. He died March 1, 1865, and nearly all the time was covered by Gove Saulsbury.

The apportionment of seats was permanently assigned to three senators and seven representatives for each of the three counties. Population of the county did not affect the number of delegates. Both chambers had a Democratic majority.

== Leadership ==
=== Senate ===
- Gove Saulsbury, Kent County
- William Hitch, Sussex County

=== House of Representatives ===
- Shephard P. Houston, Sussex County

== Members ==
=== Senate ===
Senators were elected by the public for a four-year term, some elected each two year.

New Castle County

- John P. Belville
- Isaac S. Elliott
- John F. Williamson

Kent County

- John H. Bewley
- Thomas Cahall
- Gove Saulsbury

Sussex County

- Henry Hickman
- William Hitch
- James Ponder

=== House of Representatives ===
Representatives were elected by the public for a term, every two years.

New Castle County

- John A. Alderdice
- John A. Duncan
- Andrew Eliason
- James H. Hoffecker
- John G. Jackson
- Elias N. Moore
- Merritt H. Paxson

Kent County

- Charles M. Adams
- Henry C. Douglas
- William Dyer
- William D. Fowler
- Abner Harrington
- Henry Todd
- John C. Wilson

Sussex County

- William F. Causey
- John Hickman
- Benjamin Hitch
- Shephard F. Houston
- John Jones
- Miles Messick
- James Stuart

== Places with more information ==
- Delaware Historical Society; website; 505 North Market Street, Wilmington, Delaware 19801; (302) 655-7161.
- University of Delaware; Library website; 181 South College Avenue, Newark, Delaware 19717; (302) 831-2965.
