= Draper House =

Draper House may refer to:

In the United States ordered by state

- Draper House (Milford, Delaware), listed on the National Register of Historic Places (NRHP) in Delaware
- Draper-Adkins House, listed on the NRHP in Milton, Delaware
- Draper House (Lima, New York), listed on the NRHP in Livingston County, New York
- John William Draper House, listed on the NRHP in Hastings-on-Hudson, New York
- Draper-Steadman House, listed on the NRHP in Riverton, Utah
