= 74th Delaware General Assembly =

American legislative session

←	73rd	75th	→

Overview
- Legislative body: Delaware General Assembly
- Term: January 1, 1867 – January 5, 1869

The 74th Delaware General Assembly was a meeting of the legislative branch of the state government, consisting of the Delaware Senate and the Delaware House of Representatives. Elections were held the first Tuesday after November 1 and terms began in Dover on the first Tuesday in January. This date was January 3, 1867, which was two weeks before the beginning of the first administrative year of Governor Gove Saulsbury.

Currently the distribution of the Senate Assembly seats was made to three senators for each of the three counties. Likewise the current distribution of the House Assembly seats was made to seven representatives for each of the three counties. The actual population changes of the county did not directly affect the number of senators or representatives at this time.

In the 74th Delaware General Assembly session both chambers had a Democratic majority.

== Leadership ==
=== Senate ===
- James Ponder, Sussex County, Democratic

=== House of Representatives ===
- William A. Polk, Kent County, Democratic

== Members ==
=== Senate ===
Senators were elected by the public for a four-year term, some elected each two year.

New Castle County

- Isaas S. Elliott
- Curtis B. Ellison
- John G. Jackson

Kent County

- John H. Bewley
- John W. Hall
- James W. Minors

Sussex County

- Jacob Bounds
- John H. Paynter
- James Ponder

=== House of Representatives ===
Representatives were elected by the public for a term, every two years.

New Castle County

- John A. Alderdice
- Samuel Bancroft
- James Bradford
- Charles Corbot
- Andrew Eliason
- Levi W. Lattomus
- John Pilling

Kent County

- Joseph Booth
- Peter L. Cooper Jr.
- William A. Polk
- Henry Pratt
- George A. Raymont
- Elias S. Reed
- James H. Smith

Sussex County

- John S. Bacon
- Robert H. Davis
- Raynter Frame
- John H. Houston
- Joshua J. Johnson Jr.
- Thomas A. John
- William D. Waples

== Places with more information ==
- Delaware Historical Society; website; 505 North Market Street, Wilmington, Delaware 19801; (302) 655–7161.
- University of Delaware; Library website; 181 South College Avenue, Newark, Delaware 19717; (302) 831–2965.
