= 76th Delaware General Assembly =

American legislative session

←	75th	77th	→

Overview
- Legislative body: Delaware General Assembly
- Term: January 3, 1871 – January 6, 1873

The 76th Delaware General Assembly was a meeting of the legislative branch of the state government, consisting of the Delaware Senate and the Delaware House of Representatives. Elections were held the first Tuesday after November 1 and terms began in Dover on the first Tuesday in January. This date was January 3, 1871, which was two weeks before the beginning of the first administrative year Governor James Ponder.

Currently the distribution of the Senate Assembly seats was made to three senators for each of the three counties. Likewise the current distribution of the House Assembly seats was made to seven representatives for each of the three counties. The actual population changes of the county did not directly affect the number of senators or representatives at this time.

In the 76th Delaware General Assembly session both chambers had a Democratic majority.

== Leadership ==
=== Senate ===
- Charles Gooding, New Castle County, Democratic

=== House of Representatives ===
- Sewell C. Biggs, New Castle County, Democratic

== Members ==
=== Senate ===
Senators were elected by the public for a four-year term, some elected every two years.

New Castle County

- Charles Gooding
- Allen V. Lesley
- Leonard G. Vandegrift

Kent County

- Thomas H. Denney
- John Mustard
- Curtis S. Watson

Sussex County

- Martin M. Ellis
- Thomas E. Records
- George Russell

=== House of Representatives ===
Representatives were elected by the public for a term, every two years.

New Castle County

- Sewell C. Biggs
- Benjamin Caulk
- J. Paulson Chandler
- Lot Cloud
- Aquilla Derrickerson
- Albert O. Newton
- Francis T. Perry

Kent County

- John C. Carsons
- Samuel B. Cooper
- Nimrod Harrington
- Henry H. Howe
- Samuel Hutchinson Jr.
- David Needles
- James L. Smith

Sussex County

- Curtis A. Conaway
- Levin Hitch
- Shephard P. Martin
- William W. Morris
- Jesse W. Robinson
- John W. Short
- Ebe W. Tunnell

== Places with more information ==
- Delaware Historical Society; website; 505 North Market Street, Wilmington, Delaware 19801; (302) 655-7161.
- University of Delaware; Library website; 181 South College Avenue, Newark, Delaware 19717; (302) 831-2965.
