= Hedgelawn =

Former historic house in Delaware, US

- U.S. National Register of Historic Places
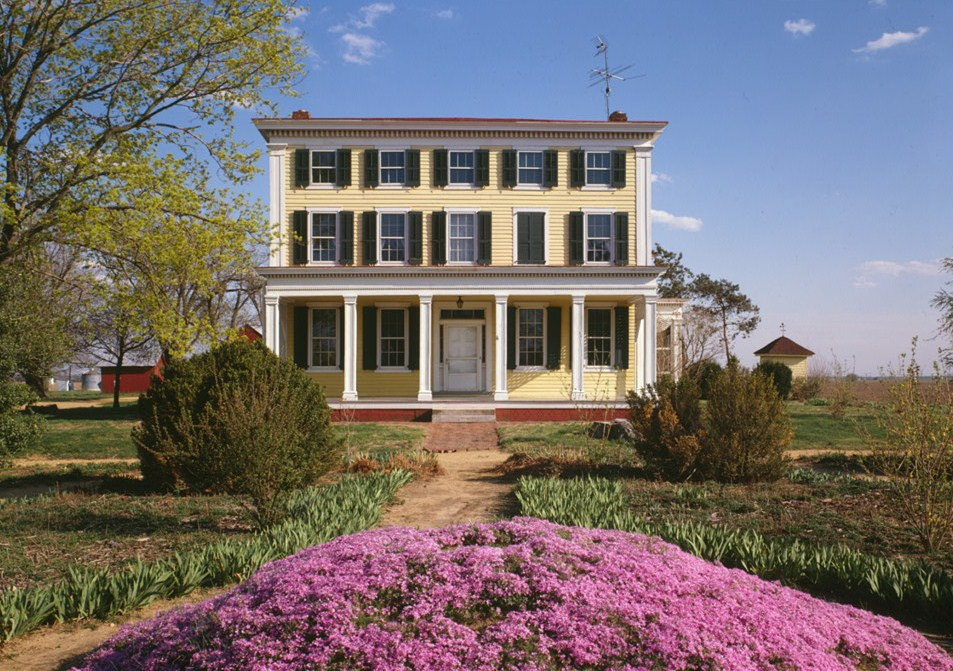
- Hedgelawn, HABS Photo, July 1982

- Location within Delaware Location within the United States
- Location: 772 Middletown-Warwick Road, Middletown, Delaware
- Coordinates: 39.441411°N 75.741573°W
- Area: 10 acres (4.0 ha)
- Built: 1856
- Architectural style: Greek Revival, Italianate, Peach Mansion
- NRHP reference No.: 73000516
- Added to NRHP: April 3, 1973

Hedgelawn, also known as the Kohl House, was a historic home located near Middletown in New Castle County, Delaware, United States. It was built in 1856, and is 2 1/2-story, five-bay, clapboard-clad frame dwelling with a flat roof. It is L-shaped. The design was influenced by the Greek Revival, Italianate, and Georgian styles. Also on the property was a contributing hipped roof privy. Hedgelawn was the home of William R. Cochran, son of John P. Cochran, 43rd Governor of Delaware (1875–1879). Prior to its demolition, the nearby Rumsey Farm house was almost identical to Hedgelawn.

It was listed on the National Register of Historic Places in 1973.

On April 30, 2017, Hedgelawn was burned to the ground in a controlled demolition, in order to make way for a motorcycle retail business. Its fate was similar to that of the nearby Summerton Mansion, also in Middletown, which was razed in 2016 to make way for a gas station.
