= Willard Saulsbury =

Willard Saulsbury is the name of:

- Willard Saulsbury Sr., U. S. Senator from Delaware in the 1860s and his son,
- Willard Saulsbury Jr., U. S. Senator from Delaware in the 1910s
