= Rumsey Farm =

Historic house in Delaware, United States

- U.S. National Register of Historic Places
- Location within Delaware Location within the United States
- Location: 829 Middletown-Warwick Road, Middletown, Delaware
- Coordinates: 39°26′29″N 75°44′58″W
- Area: 3 acres (1.2 ha)
- Built: 1854
- Built by: Stevens, Mr.
- Architectural style: Greek Revival, Italianate, Peach Mansion
- NRHP reference No.: 78000898
- Added to NRHP: March 30, 1978

Rumsey Farm was a historic home located near Middletown, New Castle County, Delaware. It was built in 1854, and was a three-story, L-shaped, frame dwelling. It was representative of Peach Mansion architecture, with Greek Revival and Italianate style details. The house had porches with Doric order columns, flat roofs with protruding bracketed cornices, and Doric corner pilasters. It was built by John P. Cochran, 43rd Governor of Delaware (1875–1879). Nearby Hedgelawn is almost identical to Rumsey.

It was listed on the National Register of Historic Places in 1978. It was demolished between 2011 and 2013.
