= 72nd Delaware General Assembly =

American legislative session

| ← | 71st | 73rd | → |

Overview
- Legislative body: Delaware General Assembly
- Term: January 6, 1863 – January 3, 1865

The 72nd Delaware General Assembly was a meeting of the legislative branch of the state government, consisting of the Delaware Senate and the Delaware House of Representatives. Elections were held the first Tuesday after November 1 and terms began on the first Tuesday in January. It met in Dover, convening January 6, 1863, two weeks before the beginning of the first year of the administration of Governor William Cannon.

The apportionment of seats was permanently assigned to three senators and seven representatives for each of the three counties. Population of the county did not effect the number of delegates. Both chambers had a Democratic majority.

== Leadership ==
=== Senate ===
- John R. Tatum, New Castle County

=== House of Representatives ===
- John Sorden, Sussex County

== Members ==
=== Senate ===
Senators were elected by the public for a four-year term, some elected each two year.

New Castle County

- John P. Belville
- John R. Tatum
- John F. Williamson

Kent County

- Thomas Cahall
- John Green
- Gove Saulsbury

Sussex County

- Henry Hickman
- William Hitch
- Hicks D. Hooper

=== House of Representatives ===
Representatives were elected by the public for a term, every two years.

New Castle County

- Solomon M. Curtis
- John A. Duncan
- David W. Gemmill
- John Hayes
- Levi W. Lattomus
- Merritt H. Paxson
- John Whitby

Kent County

- John H. Bewley
- Benjamin S. Goote
- Robert Raughley
- John Slay
- William B. Stubbs
- Curtis S. Watson
- James Williams

Sussex County

- Major W. Allen
- Isaac H. Bailey
- Luther W. Fisher
- George W. Horsey
- William A. Scribner
- John Sorden
- William D. Waples

== Places with more information ==
- Delaware Historical Society; website; 505 North Market Street, Wilmington, Delaware 19801; (302) 655-7161.
- University of Delaware; Library website; 181 South College Avenue, Newark, Delaware 19717; (302) 831-2965.
