= Governor Cochran =

Governor Cochran may refer to:

- John P. Cochran (1809–1898), 43rd Governor of Delaware
- Roy Cochran (politician) (1886–1963), 24th Governor of Nebraska
