= 70th Delaware General Assembly =

American legislative session

←	69th	71st	→

Overview
- Legislative body: Delaware General Assembly
- Term: January 4, 1859 – January 1, 1861

The 70th Delaware General Assembly was a meeting of the legislative branch of the state government, consisting of the Delaware Senate and the Delaware House of Representatives. Elections were held the first Tuesday after November 1 and terms began on the first Tuesday in January. It met in Dover, convening January 4, 1859, two weeks before the beginning of the first and second year of the administration of Governor William Burton.

The apportionment of seats was permanently assigned to three senators and seven representatives for each of the three counties. Population of the county did not effect the number of delegates. Both chambers had a Democratic majority.

== Leadership ==
=== Senate ===
- Manlove Carlisle, Sussex County

=== House of Representatives ===
- John W. F. Jackson, Kent County

== Members ==
=== Senate ===
Senators were elected by the public for a four-year term, some elected each two year.

New Castle County

- Abraham Boyce
- David W. Gemmell
- Charles T. Polk

Kent County

- Wilson L. Cannon
- Alexander Johnson
- Thomas J. Moore

Sussex County

- Manlove R. Carlisle
- John Martin
- Joseph A. McFerran

=== House of Representatives ===
Representatives were elected by the public for a term, every two years.

New Castle County

- Thomas W. Belville
- George W. Churchman
- Jonathan L. Ellison
- Franklin Q. Flinn
- John M. Naudain
- Charles H. Oldham
- Lewis Thompson

Kent County

- Jonathan Brown
- John Harrington
- John W. F. Jackson
- Caleb S. Pennewill
- Isaac Short
- William Slaughter
- Curtis S. Watson

Sussex County

- Loxley R. Jacobs
- Thomas A. Jones
- Bushrod L. May
- Alfred McIlvaine
- William H. Moore
- John W. Walker
- Benjamin White

== Places with more information ==
- Delaware Historical Society; website; 505 North Market Street, Wilmington, Delaware 19801; (302) 655-7161.
- University of Delaware; Library website; 181 South College Avenue, Newark, Delaware 19717; (302) 831-2965.
