= 1870 Delaware gubernatorial election =

- November 8, 1870
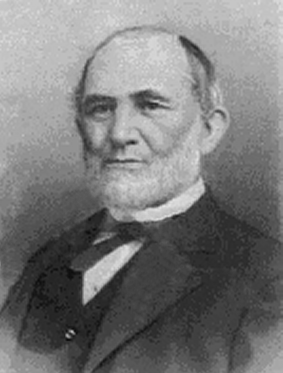

Nominee	James Ponder	Thomas B. Coursey
Party	Democratic	Republican
Popular vote	12,459	9,942
Percentage	55.62%	44.38%
- County results Ponder: 50–60% 60–70%
Governor before election
Gove Saulsbury
Democratic
Elected Governor
James Ponder
Democratic

The 1870 Delaware gubernatorial election was held on November 8, 1870. Incumbent Democratic Governor Gove Saulsbury was unable to seek re-election. Former State Senator James Ponder ran as the Democratic candidate to succeed Saulsbury and faced Republican nominee Thomas B. Coursey. As Black Delawareans gained the right to vote, Republicans were confident about their chances, and the Democratic Party responded by presenting itself as the "white man's party." Ponder ultimately defeated Coursey by a wide margin, in part because of low Black turnout and a racist backlash against Black suffrage.

== General election ==
=== Results ===
1870 Delaware gubernatorial election
Party	Candidate	Votes	%	±%
Democratic	James Ponder	12,459	55.62%	+2.33%
Republican	Thomas B. Coursey	9,942	44.38%	−2.33%
Majority		2,517	11.24%	+4.65%
Turnout		22,401	100.00%	
Democratic hold				

== Bibliography ==
- Gubernatorial Elections, 1787-1997. Washington, D.C.: Congressional Quarterly Inc. 1998. ISBN 1-56802-396-0.
- Glashan, Roy R. (1979). American Governors and Gubernatorial Elections, 1775-1978. Meckler Books. ISBN 0-930466-17-9.
- Dubin, Michael J. (2003). United States Gubernatorial Elections, 1776-1860: The Official Results by State and County. Jefferson, North Carolina: McFarland. ISBN 978-0-7864-1439-0.
- Delaware House Journal, 73rd General Assembly, 1st Reg. Sess. (1871).
