= 1866 Delaware gubernatorial election =

- November 6, 1866
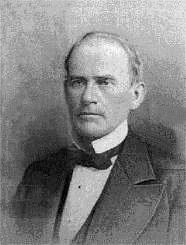

Nominee	Gove Saulsbury	James Riddle
Party	Democratic	Republican
Popular vote	9,810	8,598
Percentage	53.29%	46.71%
- County results Saulsbury: 50–60% 60–70% Riddle: 50–60%
Governor before election
Gove Saulsbury
Democratic
Elected Governor
Gove Saulsbury
Democratic

The 1866 Delaware gubernatorial election was held on November 6, 1866. On March 1, 1865, Republican Governor William Cannon died in office, elevating State Senate Speaker Gove Saulsbury, a Democrat, to the governorship. Saulsbury ran for re-election in 1866, the first Governor to do so since Joshua Clayton in 1792. He faced Republican nominee James Riddle, a prominent industrialist. Saulsbury defeated Riddle by a decisive margin, ushering in a large Democratic majority in both houses of the legislature.

== General election ==
=== Results ===
1866 Delaware gubernatorial election
Party	Candidate	Votes	%	±%
Democratic	Gove Saulsbury (inc.)	9,810	53.29%	+3.63%
Republican	James Riddle	8,598	46.71%	−3.63%
Majority		1,212	6.58%	+5.90%
Turnout		18,408	100.00%	
Democratic hold				

== Bibliography ==
- Gubernatorial Elections, 1787-1997. Washington, D.C.: Congressional Quarterly Inc. 1998. ISBN 1-56802-396-0.
- Glashan, Roy R. (1979). American Governors and Gubernatorial Elections, 1775-1978. Meckler Books. ISBN 0-930466-17-9.
- Dubin, Michael J. (2003). United States Gubernatorial Elections, 1776-1860: The Official Results by State and County. Jefferson, North Carolina: McFarland. ISBN 978-0-7864-1439-0.
- Delaware House Journal, 71st General Assembly, 1st Reg. Sess. (1867).
