= Cochran Grange =

Historic house in Delaware, US

- U.S. National Register of Historic Places
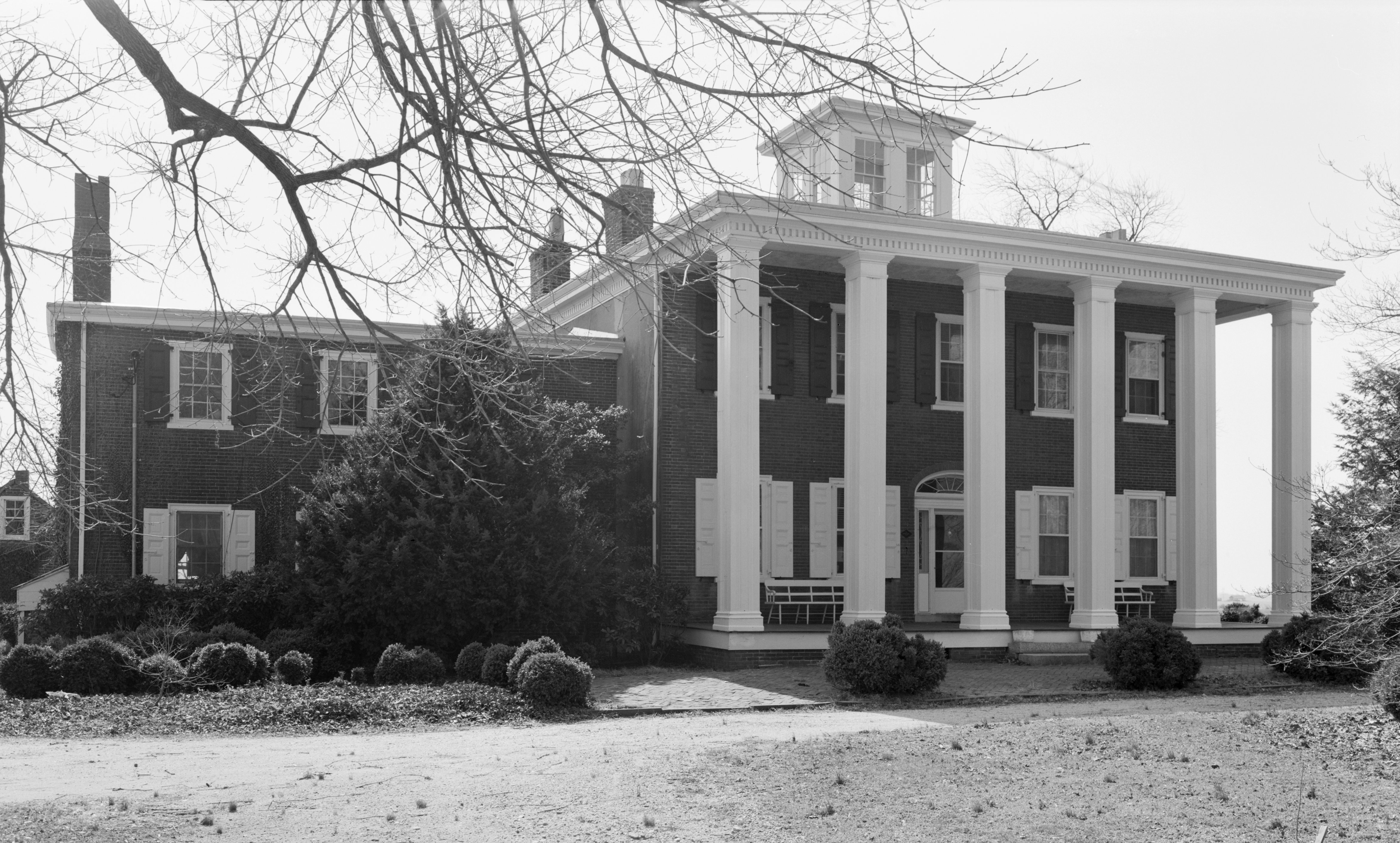
- Cochran Grange, HABS Photo, January 1983

- Location within Delaware Location within the United States
- Location: 704 Middletown-Warwick Road, Middletown, Delaware
- Coordinates: 39°26′35″N 75°44′11″W
- Area: 10 acres (4.0 ha)
- Built: 1842–1845
- Architectural style: Greek Revival, Italianate, Georgian
- NRHP reference No.: 73000514
- Added to NRHP: April 03, 1973

The Cochran Grange, also known as John P. Cochran House, is a historic home located in Middletown, Delaware, United States. It was built between 1842 and 1845, and consists of a two-story, five-bay, main block with a two-story wing. The design is influenced by the Greek Revival, Italianate, and Georgian styles. The house features a two-story porch supported by Doric order columns and a flat roof surmounted by a square cupola. Cochran Grange was the home of John P. Cochran, 43rd Governor of Delaware (1875–1879).

It was listed on the National Register of Historic Places in 1973.

== Gallery ==
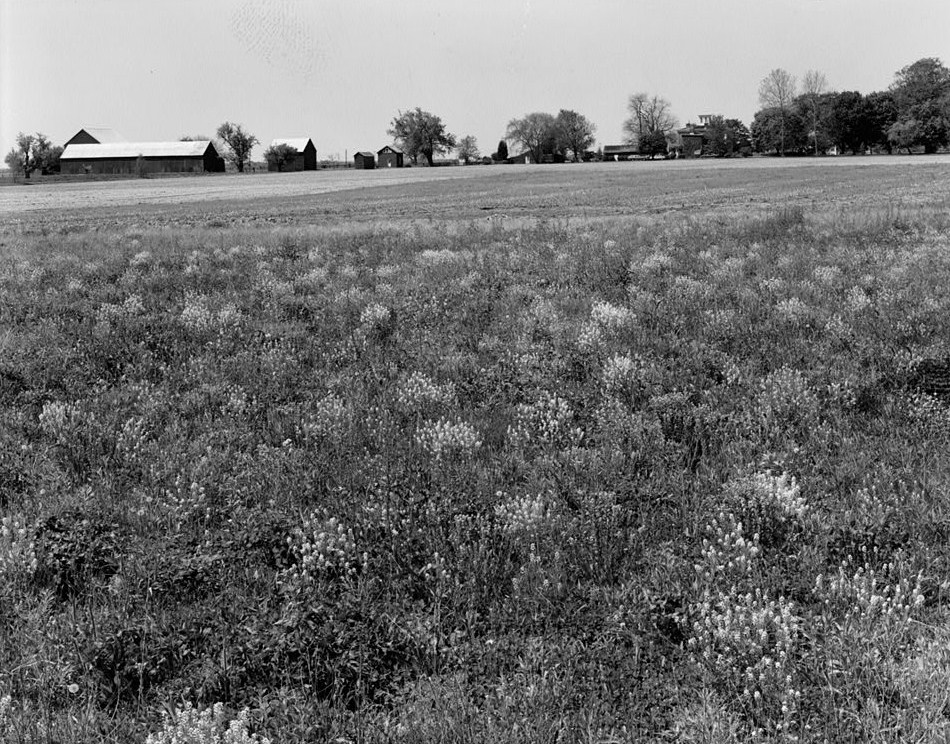
Cochran Grange, July 1982
