= Hazzard House =

Historic house in Delaware, United States

- U.S. National Register of Historic Places
- U.S. Historic district – Contributing property
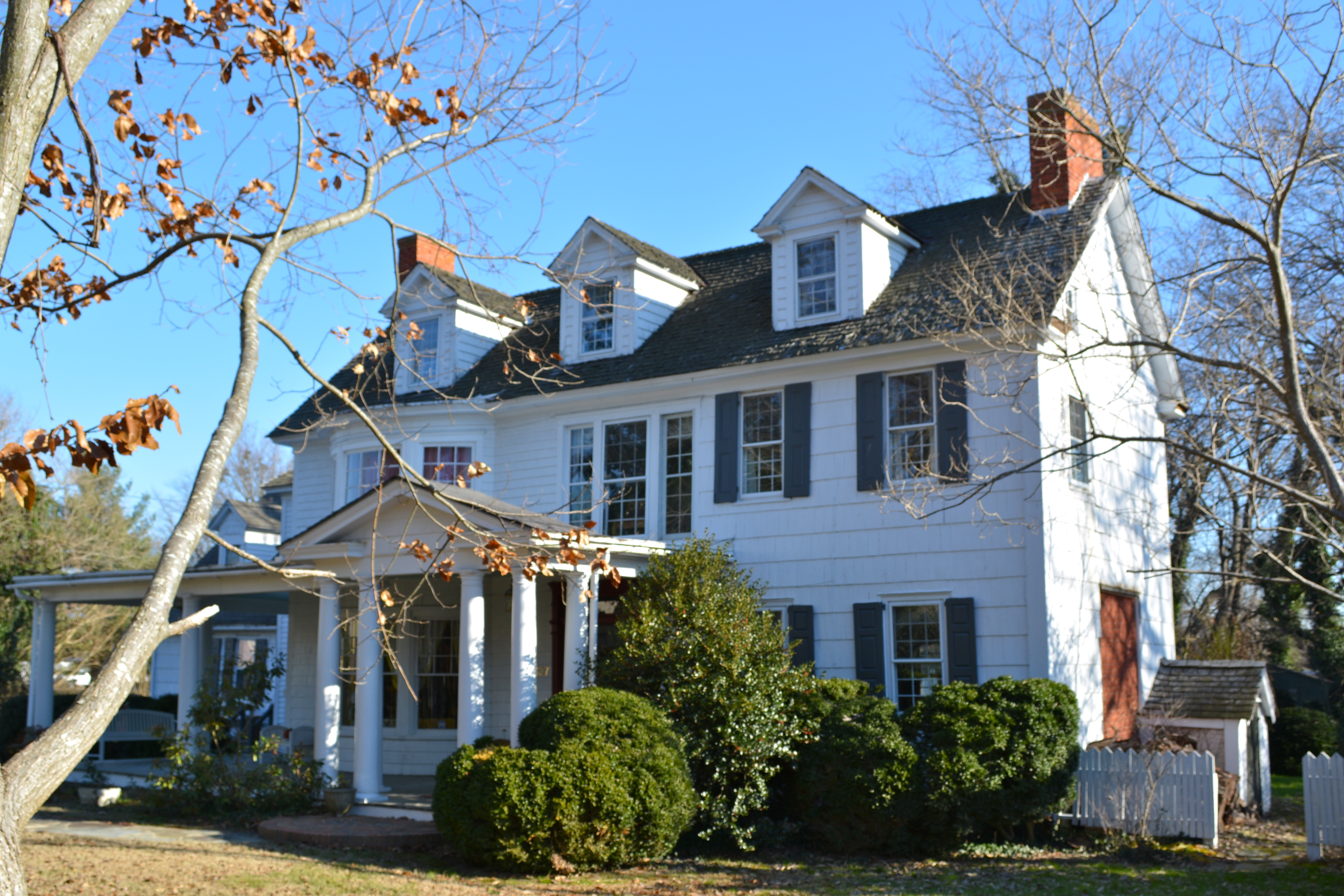

- Location within Delaware Location within the United States
- Location: 327 Union St., Milton, Delaware
- Coordinates: 38°46′55″N 75°18′46″W
- Area: 1 acre (0.40 ha)
- NRHP reference No.: 73000559
- Added to NRHP: July 2, 1973

Hazzard House is a historic home located at Milton, Sussex County, Delaware. The original section dates to the 18th century, and is a two-story, three-bay, single pile dwelling, of timber-frame construction on a brick foundation. It was expanded in the first half of the 19th century with a two-room, double pile addition. It features a large verandah. It was the home of Delaware Governor David Hazzard (1781-1864).

It was added to the National Register of Historic Places in 1973. It is located in the Milton Historic District.
