= 71st Delaware General Assembly =

American legislative session

←	70th	72nd	→

Overview
- Legislative body: Delaware General Assembly
- Term: January 1, 1861 – January 6, 1863

The 71st Delaware General Assembly was a meeting of the legislative branch of the state government, consisting of the Delaware Senate and the Delaware House of Representatives. Elections were held the first Tuesday after November 1 and terms began on the first Tuesday in January. It met in Dover, convening January 1, 1861, two weeks before the beginning of the third and fourth year of the administration of Governor William Burton.

The apportionment of seats was permanently assigned to three senators and seven representatives for each of the three counties. Population of the county did not effect the number of delegates. The Senate had a Democratic majority and the House had a Republican majority.

== Leadership ==
=== Senate ===
- Jacob Green, Kent County

=== House of Representatives ===
- John F. Williamson, New Castle County

== Members ==
=== Senate ===
Senators were elected by the public for a four-year term, some elected each two year.

New Castle County

- David W. Gemmell
- Charles T. Polk
- John R. Tatum

Kent County

- Wilson L. Cannon
- John Green
- Alexander Johnson

Sussex County

- Hards D. Hooper
- John Martin
- Joseph A. McFerran

=== House of Representatives ===
Representatives were elected by the public for a term, every two years.

New Castle County

- Henry H. Appleton
- Edward Betts
- Abram Chandler
- George W. Churchman
- Robert A. Cochran
- Anthony M. Higgins
- John F. Williamson

Kent County

- Ambrose Broadaway
- Thomas Clements Jr.
- Henderson Collins Jr.
- Thomas Davis
- John A. Moore
- William Virden
- Charles Williamson III

Sussex County

- James H. Boyce
- Peter Cahoon
- Jonathan Moore
- William S. Phillips
- William H. Richards
- Peter Robinson
- Lemuel W. Waples

== Places with more information ==
- Delaware Historical Society; website; 505 North Market Street, Wilmington, Delaware 19801; (302) 655-7161.
- University of Delaware; Library website; 181 South College Avenue, Newark, Delaware 19717; (302) 831-2965.
