= Milton Historic District (Milton, Delaware) =

Historic district in Delaware, United States

- U.S. National Register of Historic Places
- U.S. Historic district
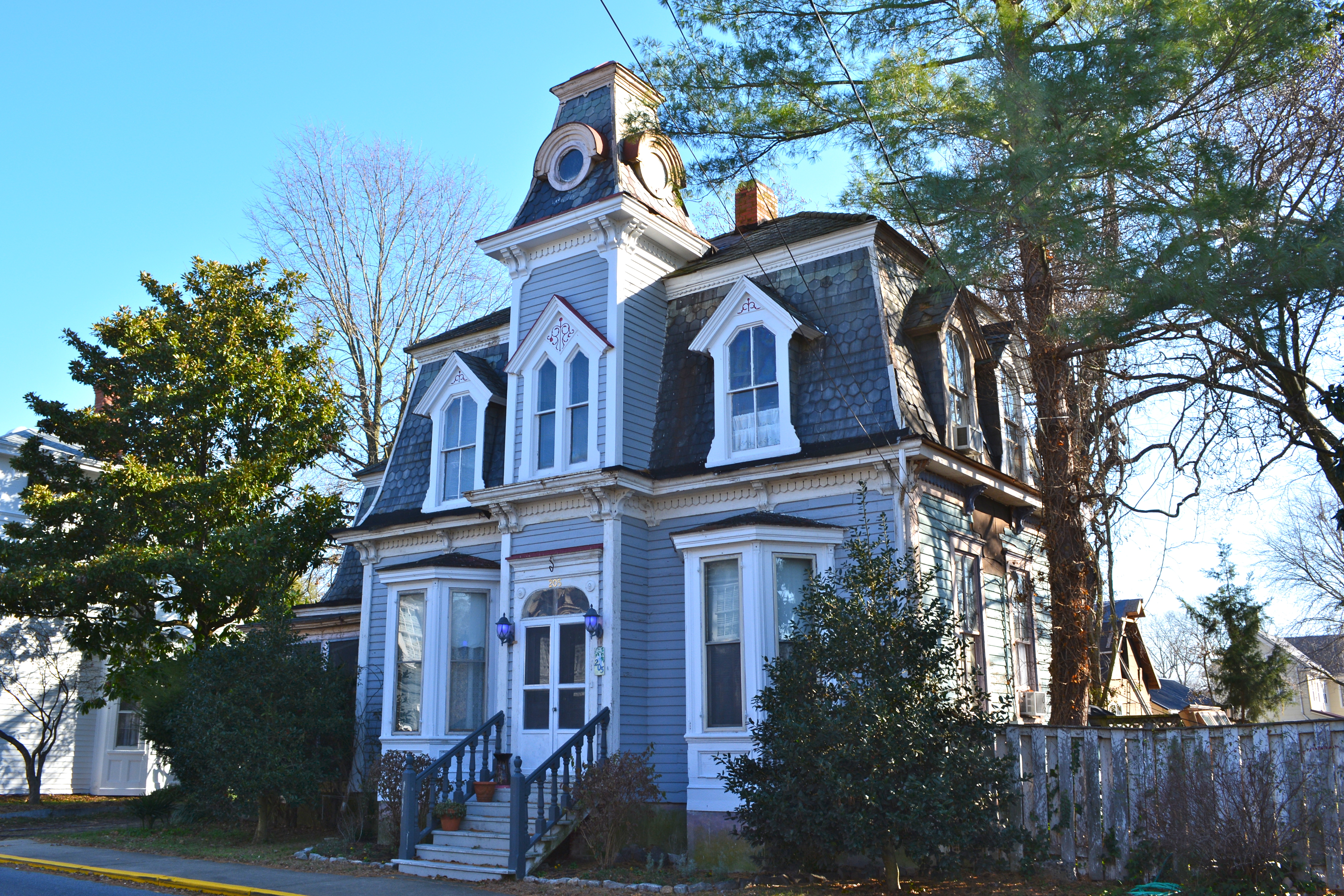
- 205 Federal Street

- Location within Delaware Location within the United States
- Location: DE 5, Milton, Delaware
- Coordinates: 38°46′35″N 75°18′35″W
- Area: 87.2 acres (35.3 ha)
- Architectural style: Late Victorian
- NRHP reference No.: 82002366 (original); 100007919 (increase)

Significant dates
- Added to NRHP: June 25, 1982
- Boundary increase: July 21, 2022

Milton Historic District is a national historic district located at Milton, Sussex County, Delaware. It includes 188 contributing buildings and 1 contributing site in the central business district and surrounding residential areas of Milton. The district includes much of Union, Federal, Broad, Chestnut, and Mill Streets, and encompasses a wide variety of residential, commercial, and institutional buildings from the late-18th century to the early-20th century. Union, Broad and Chestnut Streets include many examples of Gothic Revival and vernacular building styles popular in the 19th century, while Federal Street is noted for larger homes that include many Second Empire, Queen Anne, and Federal style homes, as well as Gothic Revival and vernacular styles. Notable non-residential buildings on Union Street include the Lydia B. Cannon Museum building (formerly Grace Church, 1859), the "Irish Eyes" restaurant (two storefronts built in 1910), and the Milton Theater (1939). On Federal Street, there are the Sussex Trust, Title and Safe Deposit Company building (1901, now housing a hair salon), and the Episcopal Church of St. John Baptist (1877).. Located in the district and separately listed are the Draper-Adkins House, Hazzard House, and Gov. James Ponder House.

It was added to the National Register of Historic Places in 1982, with a boundary increase in 2022.

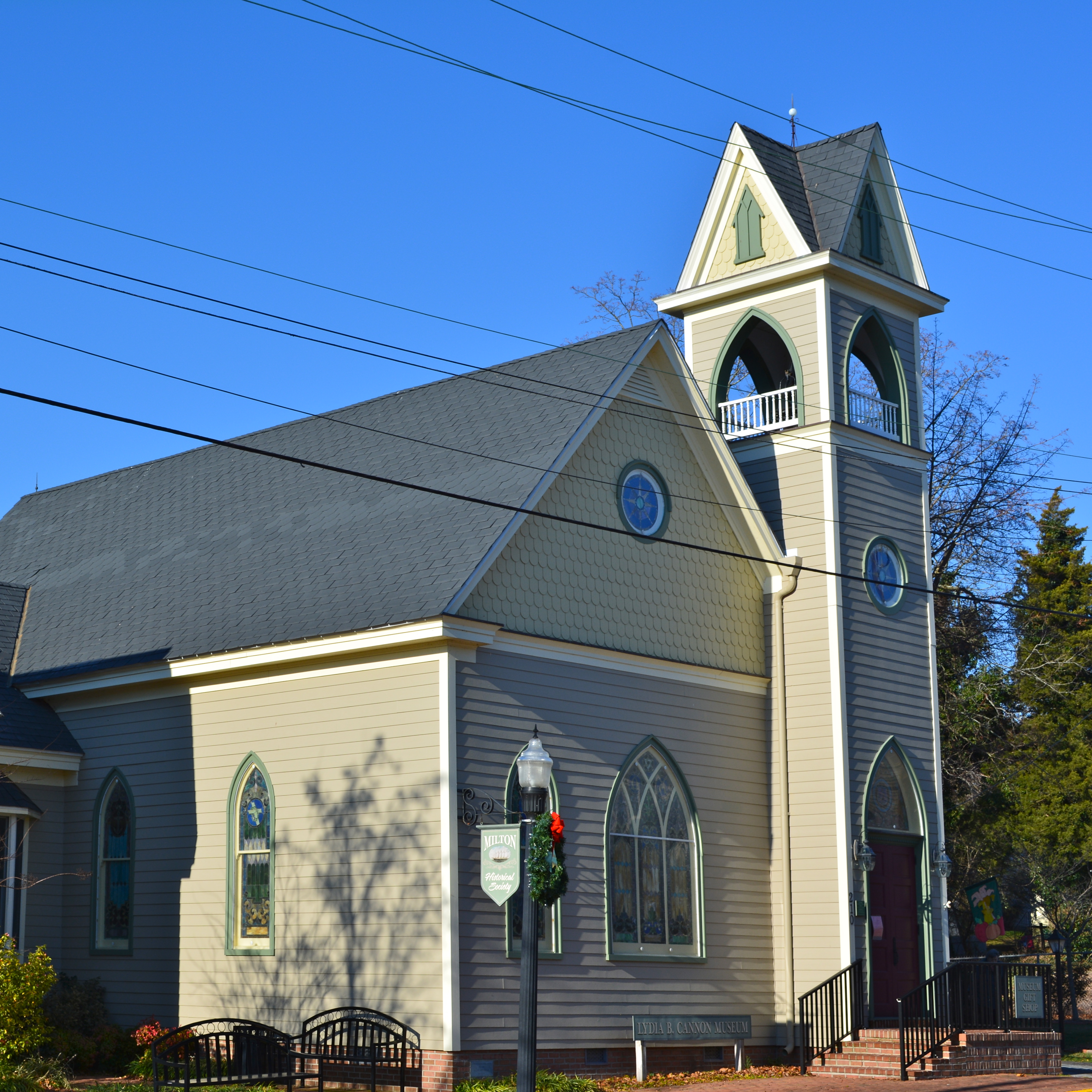
Lydia B, Cannon Museum, home of the Milton Historical Society, on Union Street

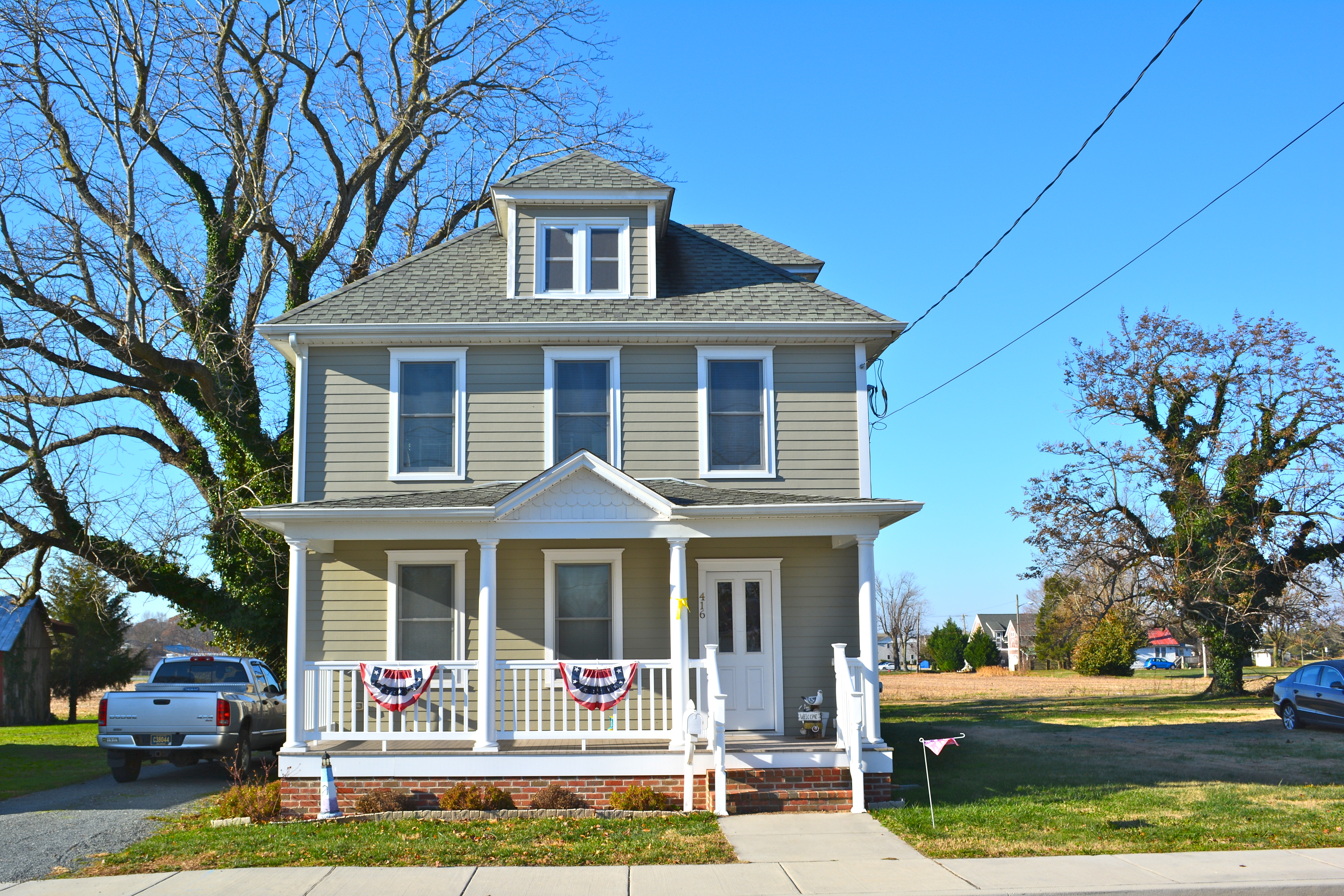
416 Union St.

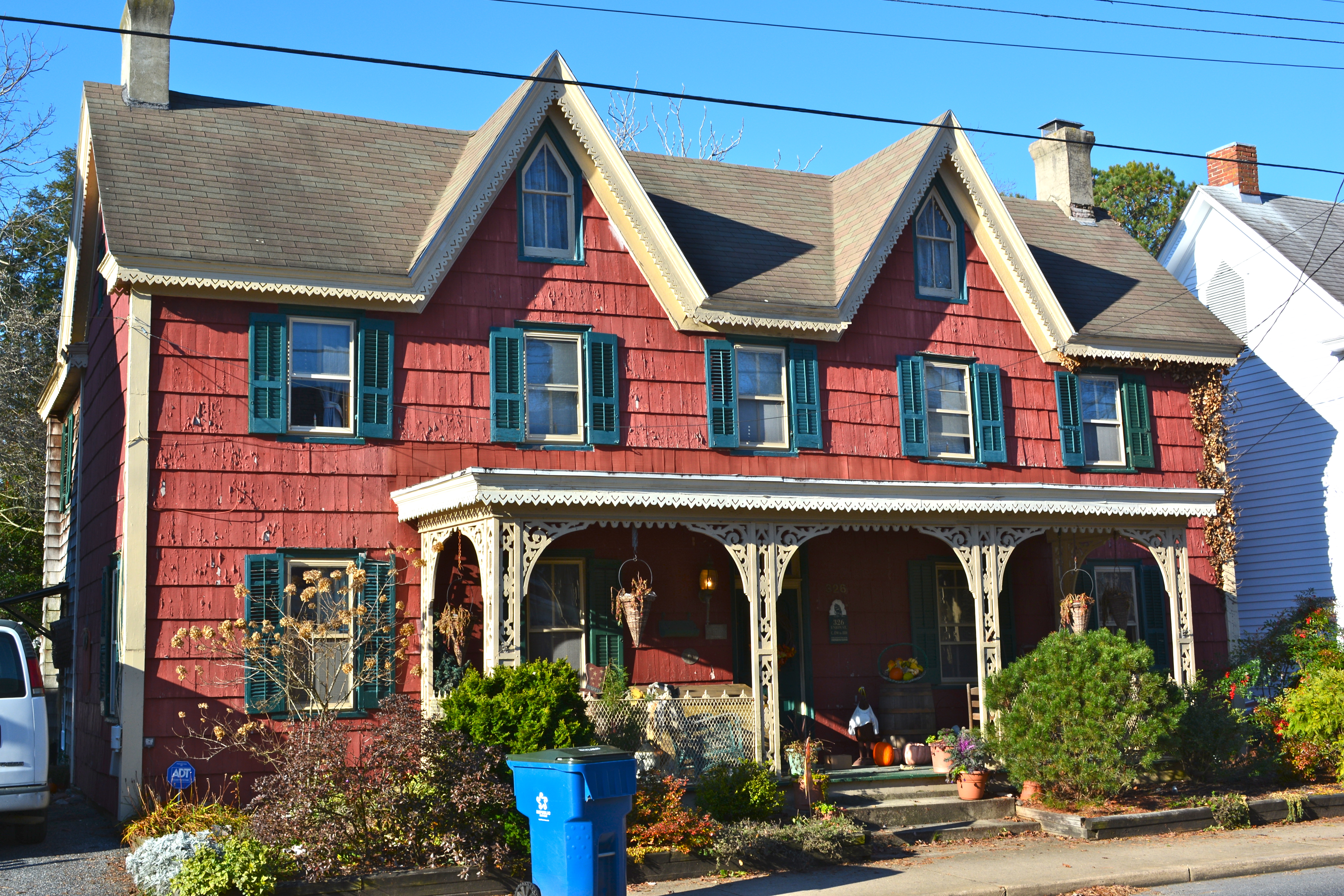
326 Union St.

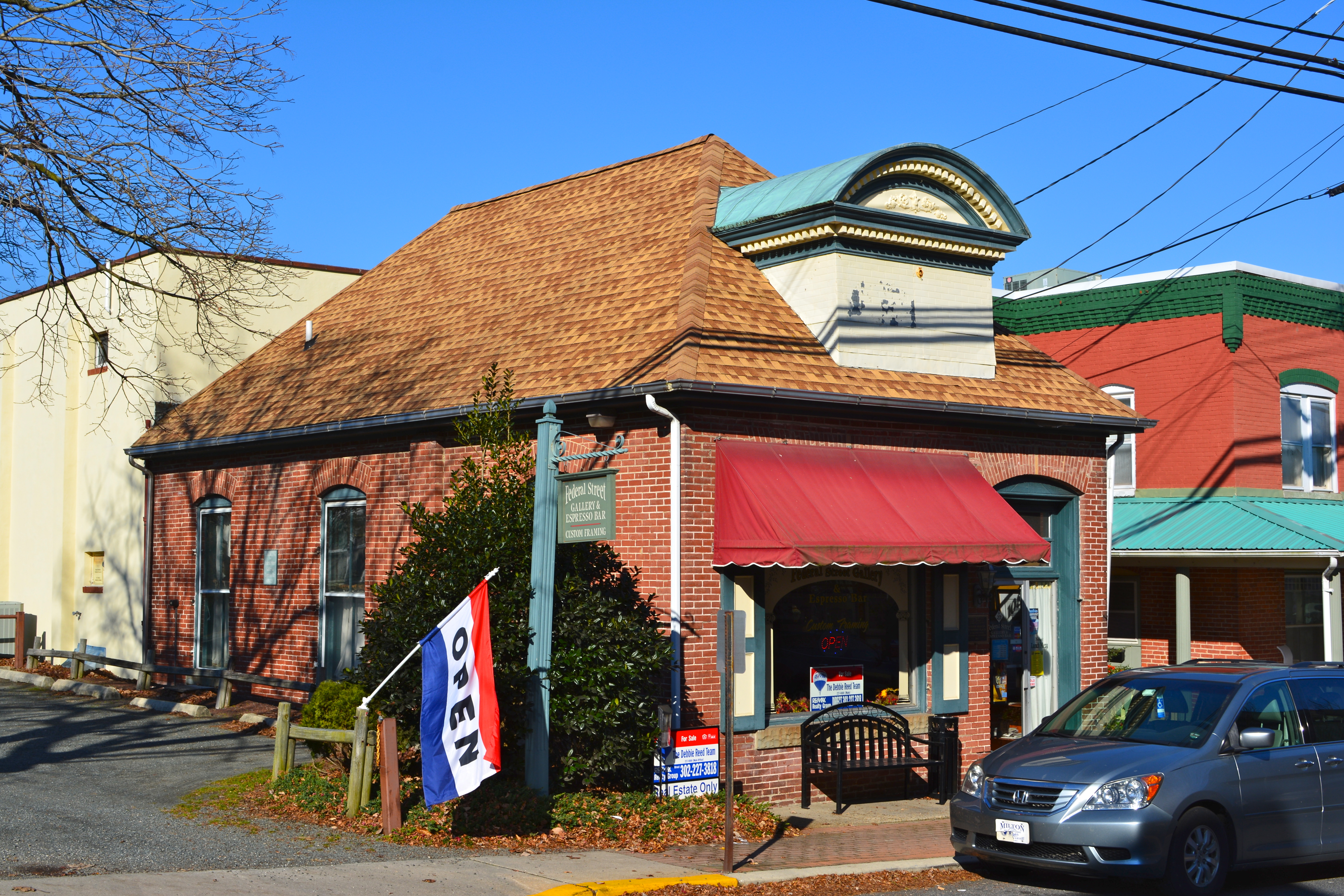
Former Sussex Trust, Title and Safe Deposit Co. building on Federal Street, completed 1901

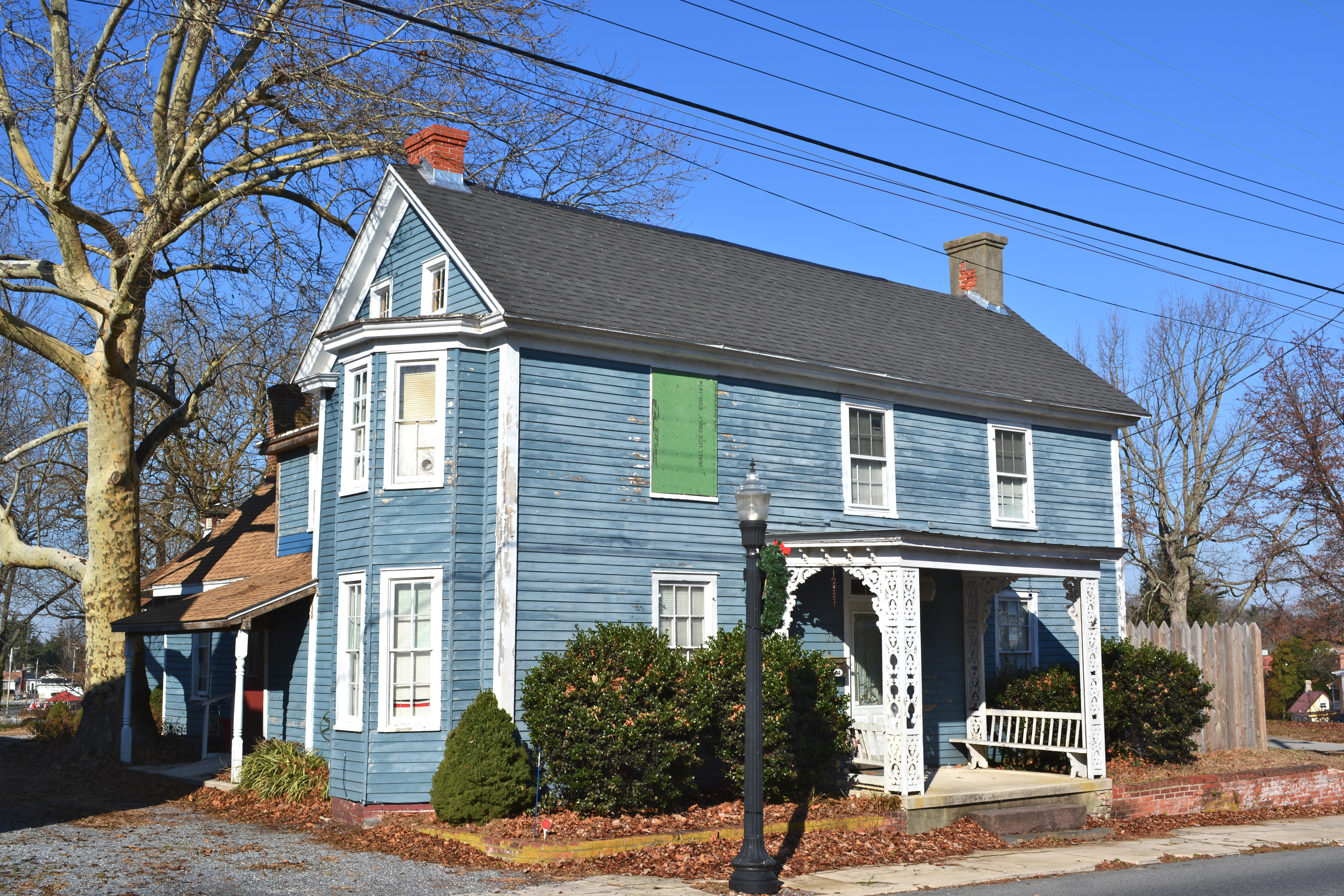
120 Federal St.
