= Gov. James Ponder House =

Historic house in Delaware, United States

- U.S. National Register of Historic Places
- U.S. Historic district – Contributing property
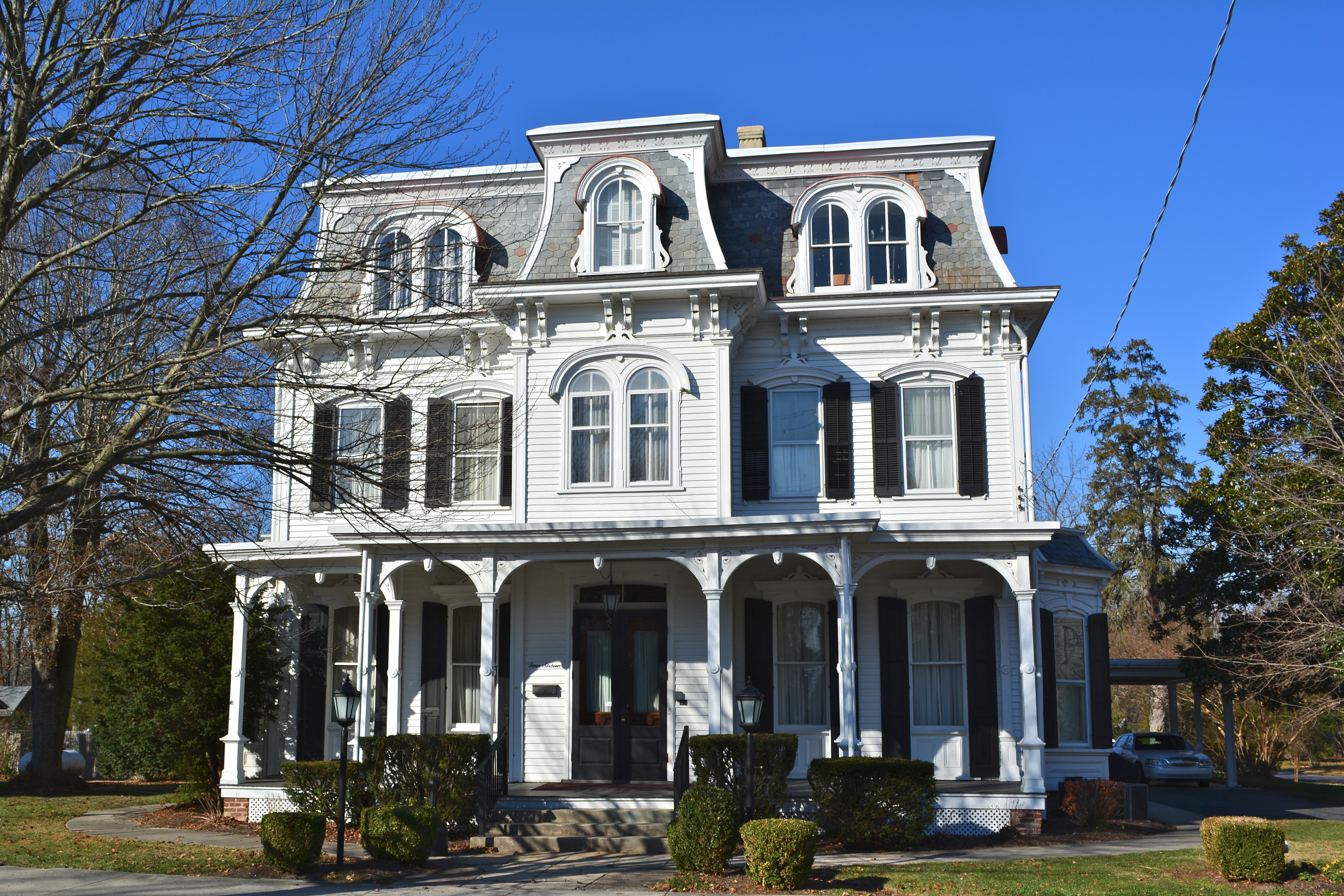

- Location within Delaware Location within the United States
- Location: 416 Federal St., Milton, Delaware
- Coordinates: 38°46′26″N 75°18′49″W
- Area: 0.5 acres (0.20 ha)
- Built: 1875
- Architectural style: Late Victorian, Center hall plan
- NRHP reference No.: 73000560
- Added to NRHP: May 24, 1973

Gov. James Ponder House, now the Short Funeral Chapel, is a historic home located at Milton, Sussex County, Delaware. It was built about 1875, and is a three-story, five-bay, Victorian townhouse. It features a mansard roof and has a center hall plan. The front facade features a full-width verandah. It was the home of Delaware Governor James Ponder (1819-1897). The building now houses a mortuary and rear additions were made to accommodate that use.

It was added to the National Register of Historic Places in 1973. It is located in the Milton Historic District.
