= Draper–Adkins House =

Historic house in Delaware, United States

- U.S. National Register of Historic Places
- U.S. Historic district – Contributing property
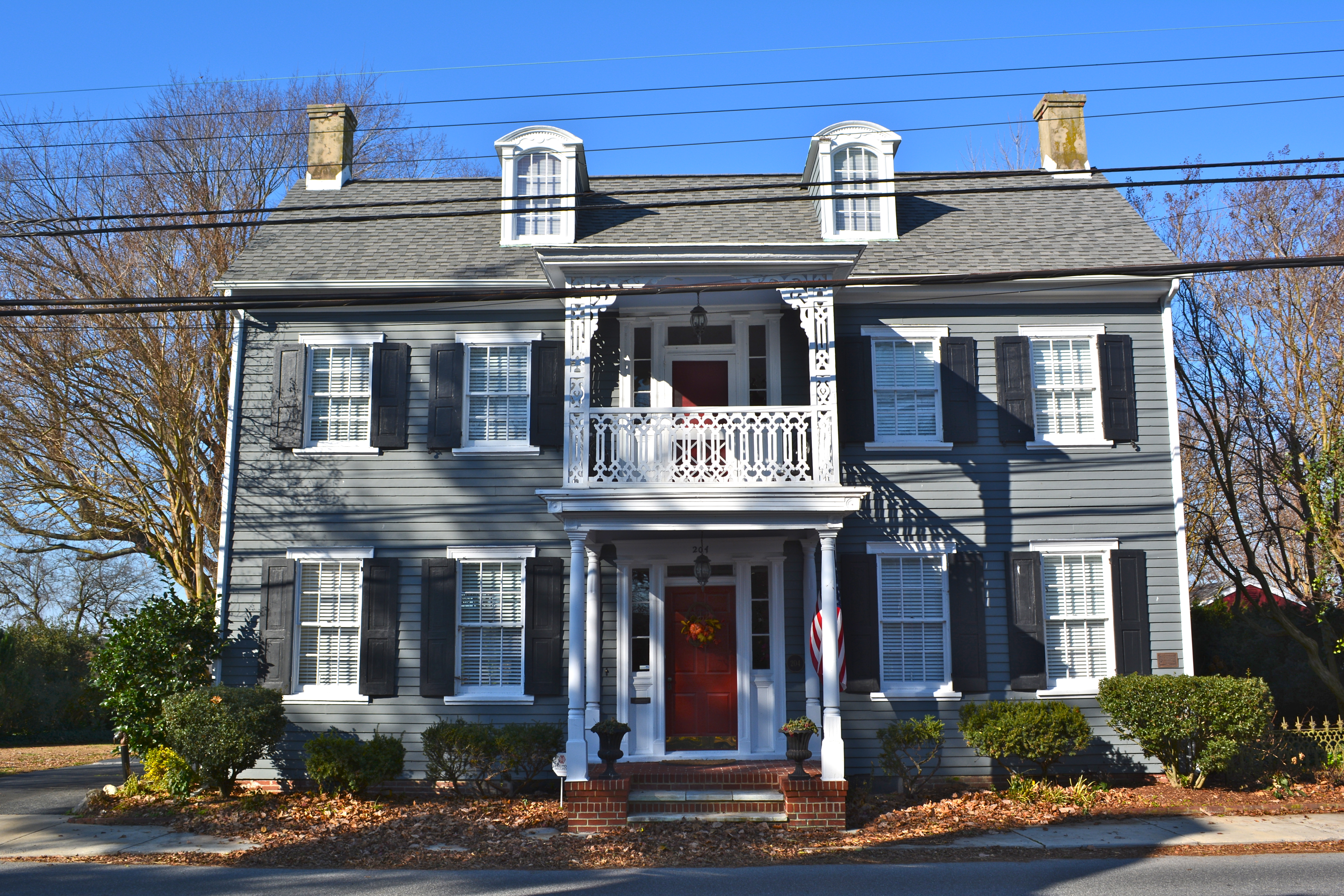

- Location within Delaware Location within the United States
- Location: 204 Federal St., Milton, Delaware
- Coordinates: 38°46′36″N 75°18′41″W
- Area: less than one acre
- Built: c. 1840
- Architectural style: Greek Revival
- NRHP reference No.: 73000558
- Added to NRHP: April 11, 1973

Draper–Adkins House, also known as the Jenny Adkins House, is a historic home located at Milton, Sussex County, Delaware. It was built about 1840, and is a 2 1/2-story, five-bay, single pile, wood frame dwelling clad in weatherboard. The interior has Greek Revival style details. It sits on a brick foundation has a lower rear wing, and has a two-story front portico with scroll-cut wooden decoration.

It was added to the National Register of Historic Places in 1973. It is located in the Milton Historic District.
