= Eli Saulsbury =

American lawyer and politician (1817–1893)

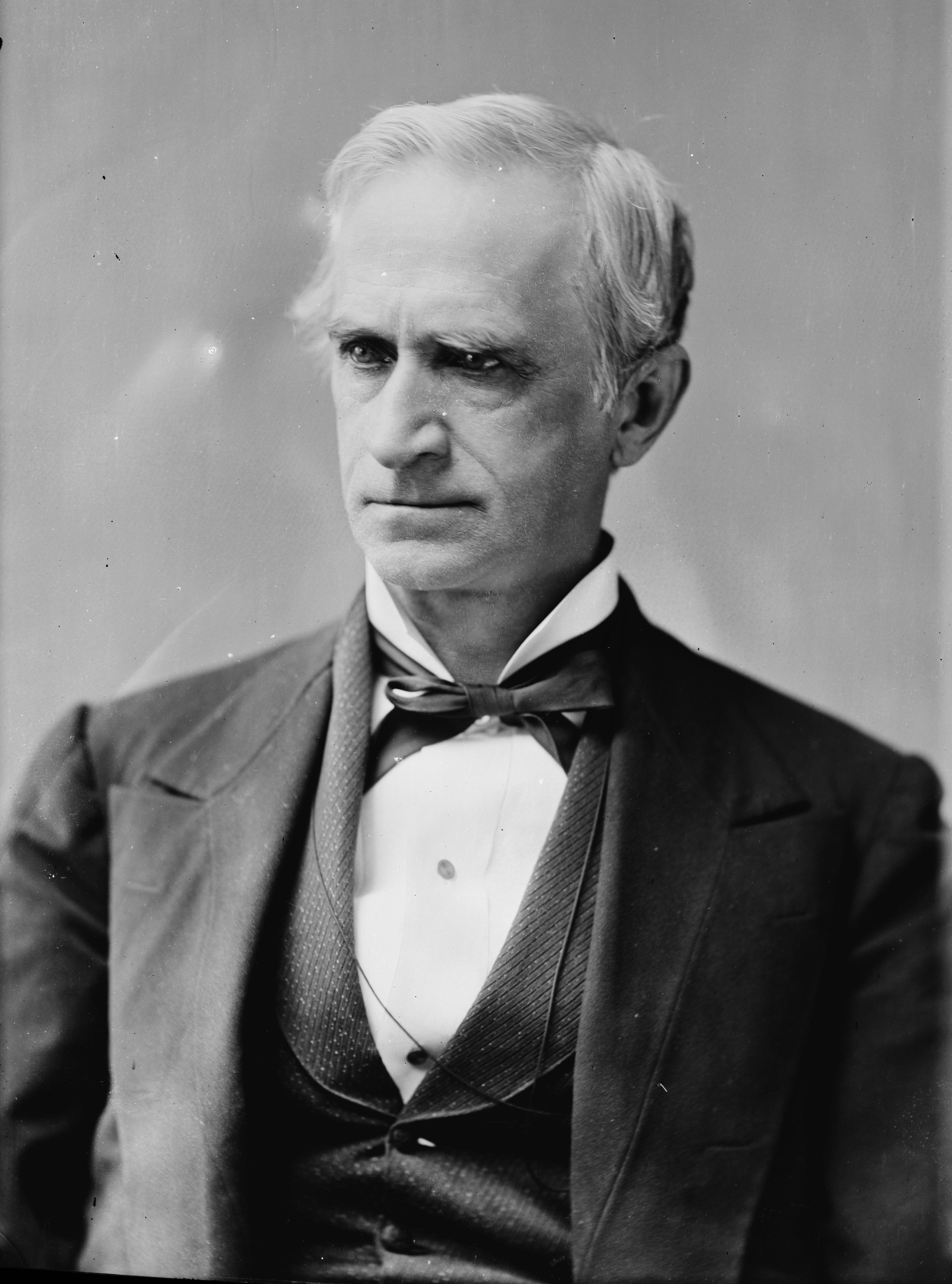

United States Senator from Delaware
- In office March 4, 1871 – March 3, 1889
- Preceded by: Willard Saulsbury Sr.
- Succeeded by: Anthony Higgins

Member of the Delaware House of Representatives
- In office 1853–1855

Personal details
- Born: December 29, 1817 Kent County, Delaware, U.S.
- Died: March 22, 1893 (aged 75) Dover, Delaware, U.S.
- Party: Democratic
- Education: Dickinson College
- Profession: lawyer

Eli Saulsbury (December 29, 1817 – March 22, 1893) was an American lawyer and politician from Dover, in Kent County, Delaware. He was a member of the Democratic Party, who served in the Delaware General Assembly and as U.S. Senator from Delaware.

== Early life and family ==
Saulsbury was born in Mispillion Hundred, Kent County, Delaware, son of William and Margaret Ann (Smith) Saulsbury. He was the middle brother of Governor Gove Saulsbury and U.S. Senator Willard Saulsbury Sr. According to a local Caroline County history, Eli and his brothers attended the Chinquapin School in Burrsville. Saulsbury was educated at Dickinson College, studied law, was admitted to the Delaware Bar in 1857, and began his practice in Dover, Delaware, where he lived.

== Political career ==
Saulsbury served one term in the State House, during the 1853/54 session. In 1871 he successfully challenged his younger brother, incumbent U.S. Senator Willard Saulsbury Sr., for his seat in the U.S. Senate. He went on to win three full terms but was defeated in an attempt for a fourth term by Republican candidate Anthony Higgins. He was in office from March 4, 1871, until March 3, 1889, and served on the Committee on Privileges and Elections in the 46th Congress, and the Committee on Engrossed Bills in the 47th Congress through the 50th Congress.

He opposed civil rights for African Americans in 1873.

== Death and legacy ==
Saulsbury died at Dover and is buried there in the Silver Lake Cemetery.

== Almanac ==
Elections are held the first week of November. Members of the Delaware General Assembly take office the first week of January. The State House has a term of two years. The General Assembly chose the U.S. Senators, who took office March 4 for a six-year term.

Public offices
Office	Type	Location	Began office	Ended office	Notes
State Representative	Legislature	Dover	January 4, 1853	January 2, 1855	
U.S. Senator	Legislature	Washington, D.C.	March 4, 1871	March 3, 1877	
U.S. Senator	Legislature	Washington, D.C.	March 4, 1877	March 3, 1883	
U.S. Senator	Legislature	Washington, D.C.	March 4, 1883	March 3, 1889	

Delaware General Assembly service
Dates	Congress	Chamber	Majority	Governor	Committees	Class/District
1853/54	67th	State House	Democratic	William H. H. Ross		Kent at-large

United States congressional service
Dates	Congress	Chamber	Majority	President	Committees	Class/District
1871–1873	42nd	U.S. Senate	Republican	Ulysses S. Grant		class 2
1873–1875	43rd	U.S. Senate	Republican	Ulysses S. Grant		class 2
1875–1877	44th	U.S. Senate	Republican	Ulysses S. Grant		class 2
1877–1879	45th	U.S. Senate	Republican	Rutherford B. Hayes		class 2
1879–1881	46th	U.S. Senate	Democratic	Rutherford B. Hayes		class 2
1881–1883	47th	U.S. Senate	Democratic	James A. Garfield; Chester A. Arthur		class 2
1883–1885	48th	U.S. Senate	Republican	Chester A. Arthur		class 2
1885–1887	49th	U.S. Senate	Republican	Grover Cleveland		class 2
1887–1889	50th	U.S. Senate	Republican	Grover Cleveland		class 2

== Images ==
- Biographical Directory of the United States Congress

== Places with more information ==
- Delaware Historical Society; website; 505 North Market Street, Wilmington, Delaware 19801.
- University of Delaware; Library website; 181 South College Avenue, Newark, Delaware 19717.

U.S. Senate
Preceded by Willard Saulsbury Sr.	U.S. senator (Class 2) from Delaware; March 4, 1871 – March 3, 1889; Served alongside: Thomas F. Bayard, George Gray	Succeeded by Anthony Higgins
