= Draper–Steadman House =

Historic house in Utah, United States

- U.S. National Register of Historic Places
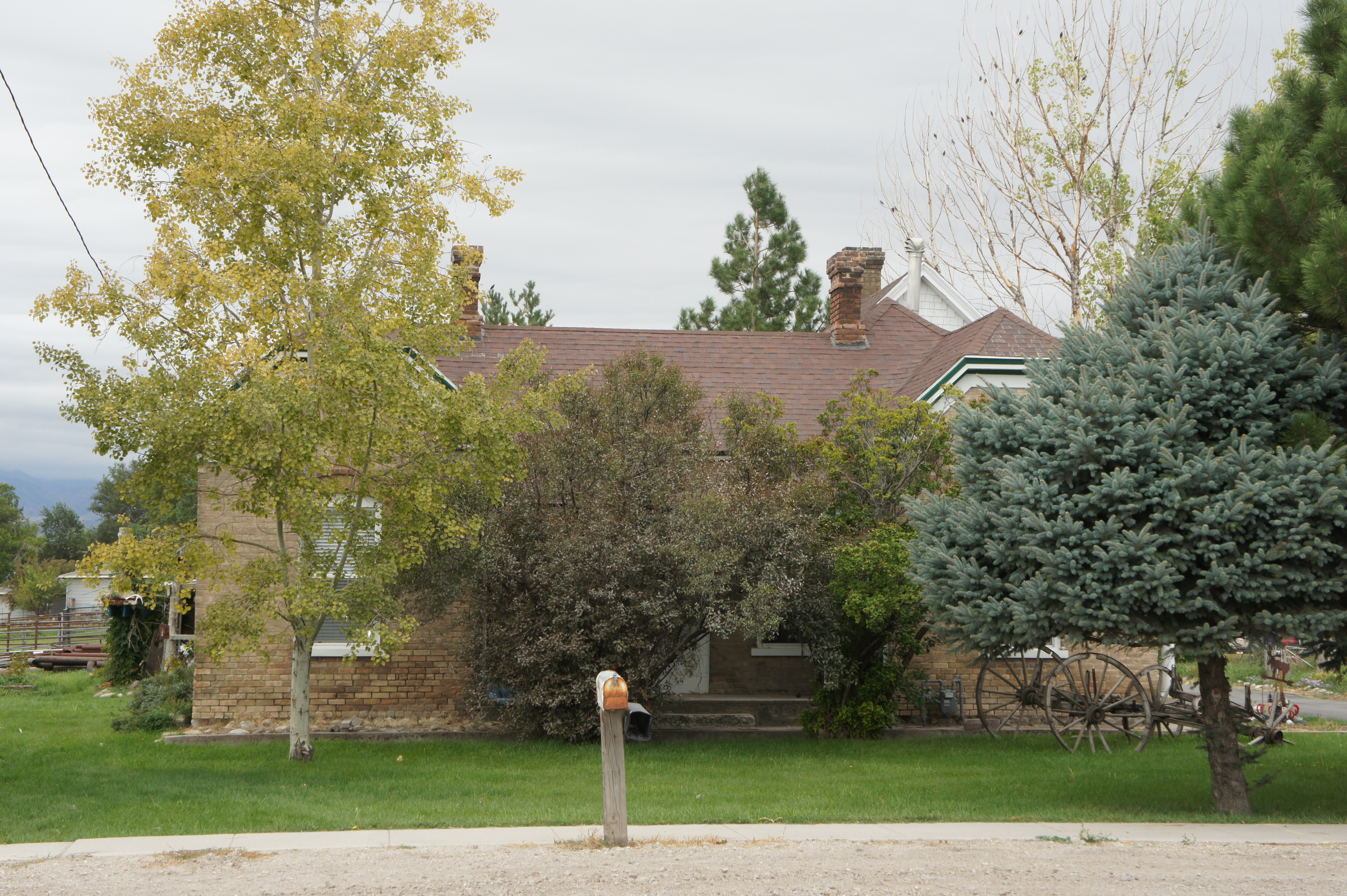

- Location within Utah Location within the United States
- Location: 13518 S. 1700 West, Riverton, Utah
- Coordinates: 40°30′19″N 111°56′18″W
- Area: 3.6 acres (1.5 ha)
- Built: c. 1894
- Architectural style: Classical Revival, Late Victorian, Victorian Eclectic
- NRHP reference No.: 92001057
- Added to NRHP: August 21, 1992

The Draper–Steadman House (also known as the Draper–Steadman–Morgan House) is a historic house located at 13518 South 1700 West in Riverton, Utah, United States.

== Description and history ==
Constructed in 1894, its National Register of Historic Places nomination asserted that, "the house is architecturally significant as one of the best examples of the Victorian Eclectic style in Riverton and as a rare example of the double cross-wing house type." Also on the property is one contributing building, originally used as a privy and built from the same bricks as the main house. There are other non-contributing structures on the property, some of which were apparently destroyed by fire sometime in the late 1970s.

The people for whom the house is named are Josiah Draper, the original owner of the house, James Steadman, a subsequent owner who constructed two additions to the house, and Vernon H. Morgan, who purchased the house from James Steadman.

It was listed on the National Register of Historic Places on August 21, 1992.
