= Milton, Delaware =

- Town
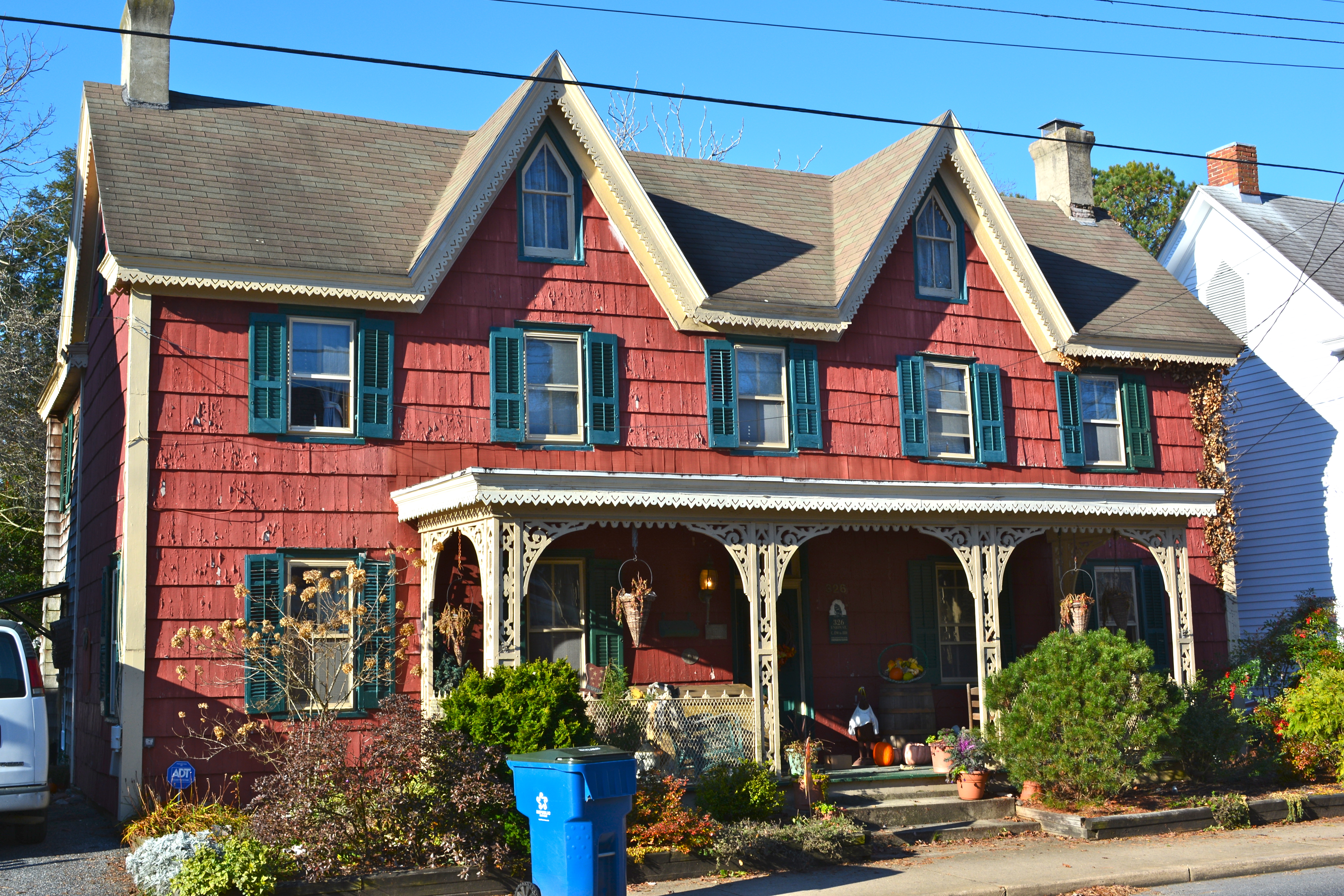
- House in Milton Historic District

- Flag

- Location of Milton in Sussex County, Delaware.

- Location within the state of Delaware Milton (the United States)
- Coordinates: 38°46′39″N 75°18′36″W
- Country: United States
- State: Delaware
- County: Sussex
- Founded: 1763 (263 years ago) (as Head of Broadkiln)
- Incorporated: March 17, 1865 (161 years ago)

Government
  - Type: Council-Manager
  - Mayor: John R. Collier (NP)
  - Town Manager: Kristy Rogers

Area
  - Total: 1.89 sq mi (4.89 km^{2})
  - Land: 1.79 sq mi (4.63 km^{2})
  - Water: 0.10 sq mi (0.26 km^{2})
- Elevation: 10 ft (3.0 m)

Population (2020)
  - Total: 3,291
  - Density: 1,842.4/sq mi (711.35/km^{2})
- Time zone: UTC−5 (Eastern (EST))
  - Summer (DST): UTC−4 (EDT)
- ZIP code: 19968
- Area code: 302
- FIPS code: 10-48330
- GNIS feature ID: 214325
- Website: milton.delaware.gov

Milton is a town in Sussex County, Delaware, United States, on the Delmarva Peninsula. It is located on the Broadkill River, which empties into Delaware Bay. The population was 3,291 at the 2020 census.

It is part of the rapidly growing Cape Region and lies within the Salisbury, Maryland-Delaware Metropolitan Statistical Area. Delaware Route 5 passes through Milton.

== History ==
Located at the head of the Broadkill River, which enters Delaware Bay, the Milton area was first settled in 1672 by English colonists and founded as Head of Broadkiln in 1763. It became important for shipbuilding. The town was renamed by the Delaware Legislature in 1807, in honor of the English poet John Milton. The Delaware General Assembly passed a charter on March 17, 1865, that recognized the Town of Milton as a municipality.

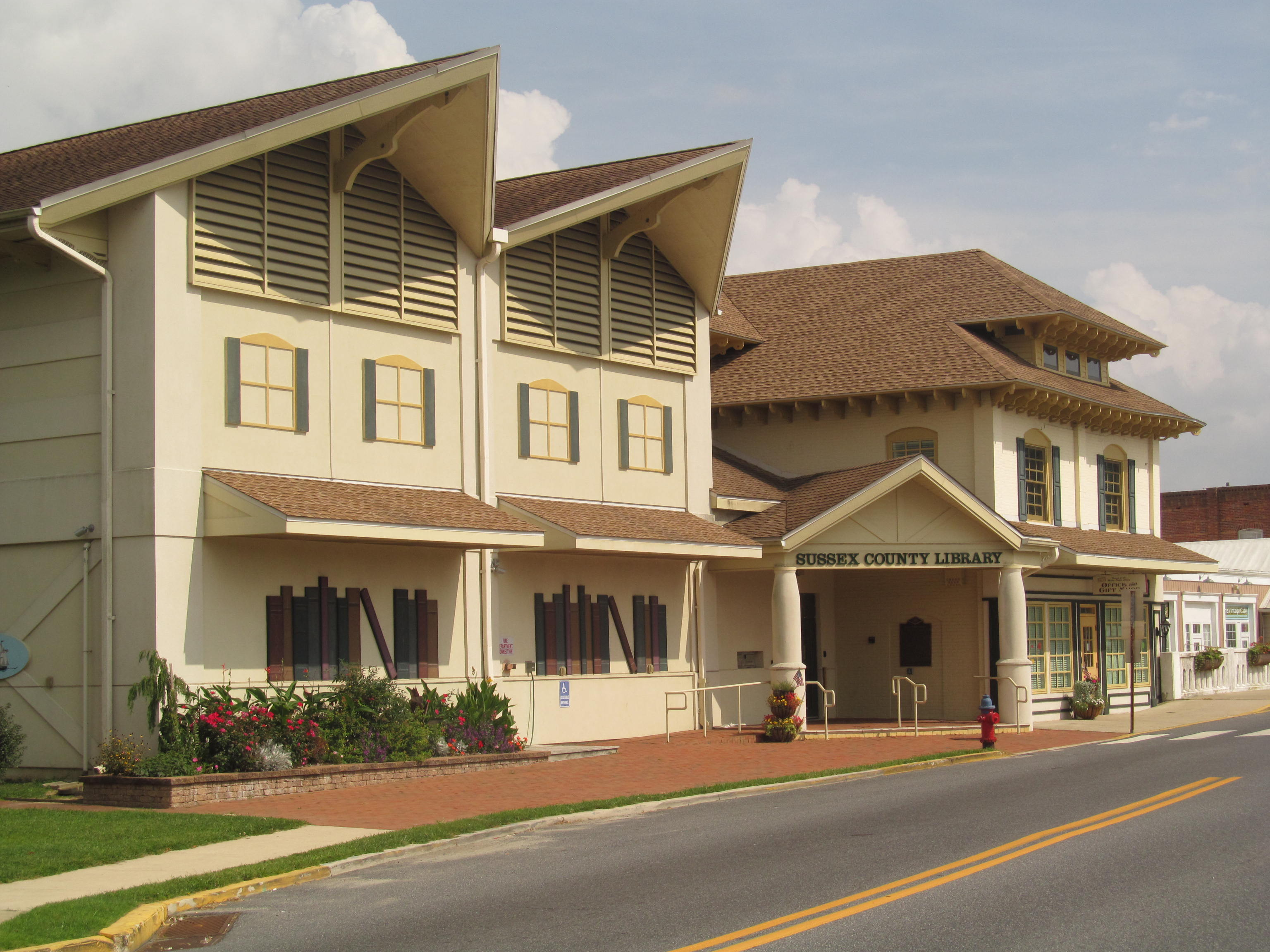
Sussex County Library in Milton

History and Milton's shipbuilding heritage remain very important to the town, which is home to some of the finest Victorian and Colonial architecture in Delaware. Many of the homes have been restored to their original form, particularly those on Union and Federal streets.

== Geography ==
Milton is located along the Broadkill River.

According to the United States Census Bureau, the town has a total area of 1.2 square miles (3.1 km^{2}), of which 1.1 square miles (2.8 km^{2}) is land and 0.1 square miles (0.26 km^{2}) (8.62%) is water.

=== Climate ===
In Milton, the summers are warm and muggy; the winters are very cold, wet, and windy; and it is partly cloudy year round. Over the course of the year, the temperature typically varies from 28 °F to 86 °F and is rarely below 15 °F or above 93 °F. Based on the tourism score, the best times of year to visit Milton for warm-weather activities are for the entire month of June and from mid August to early October.

The hot season lasts for 3.5 months, from June 1 to September 17, with an average daily high temperature above 77 °F. The hottest month of the year in Milton is July, with an average high of 86 °F and low of 70 °F. The cold season lasts for 3.2 months, from December 5 to March 10, with an average daily high temperature below 52 °F. The coldest month of the year in Milton is January, with an average low of 29 °F and high of 44 °F.

Rain falls throughout the year in Milton. The month with the most rain in Milton is August, with an average rainfall of 3.6 inches. The month with the least rain in Milton is February, with an average rainfall of 2.6 inches.

The snowy period of the year lasts for 3.2 months, from December 7 to March 15, with a sliding 31-day snowfall of at least 1.0 inches. The month with the most snow in Milton is February, with an average snowfall of 3.6 inches.

The growing season in Milton typically lasts for 7.3 months (223 days), from around March 31 to around November 9, rarely starting before March 13 or after April 18, and rarely ending before October 23 or after November 28.

== Demographics ==
Historical population
Census	Pop.	Note	%±
1860	780		—
1870	824		5.6%
1880	1,026		24.5%
1890	1,074		4.7%
1900	948		−11.7%
1910	1,038		9.5%
1920	898		−13.5%
1930	1,130		25.8%
1940	1,198		6.0%
1950	1,321		10.3%
1960	1,617		22.4%
1970	1,490		−7.9%
1980	1,359		−8.8%
1990	1,417		4.3%
2000	1,657		16.9%
2010	2,576		55.5%
2020	3,291		27.8%
U.S. Decennial Census

=== 2020 census ===
As of the 2020 census, Milton had a population of 3,291. The median age was 50.9 years. 17.8% of residents were under the age of 18 and 32.8% of residents were 65 years of age or older. For every 100 females there were 84.8 males, and for every 100 females age 18 and over there were 80.3 males age 18 and over.

0.0% of residents lived in urban areas, while 100.0% lived in rural areas.

There were 1,478 households in Milton, of which 24.2% had children under the age of 18 living in them. Of all households, 47.8% were married-couple households, 12.7% were households with a male householder and no spouse or partner present, and 32.1% were households with a female householder and no spouse or partner present. About 29.7% of all households were made up of individuals and 18.0% had someone living alone who was 65 years of age or older.

There were 1,682 housing units, of which 12.1% were vacant. The homeowner vacancy rate was 1.7% and the rental vacancy rate was 5.4%.

Racial composition as of the 2020 census
Race	Number	Percent
White	2,615	79.5%
Black or African American	326	9.9%
American Indian and Alaska Native	31	0.9%
Asian	29	0.9%
Native Hawaiian and Other Pacific Islander	1	0.0%
Some other race	87	2.6%
Two or more races	202	6.1%
Hispanic or Latino (of any race)	263	8.0%

=== 2000 census ===
As of the census of 2000, there were 1,657 people, 700 households, and 438 families residing in the town. The population density was 1,568.5 inhabitants per square mile (605.6/km^{2}). There were 804 housing units at an average density of 761.1 units per square mile (293.9 units/km^{2}). The racial makeup of the town was 67.11% White, 24.32% Black, 0.24% Native American, 0.48% Asian, 0.12% Pacific Islander, 6.04% from other races, and 1.69% from two or more races. Hispanic or Latino of any race were 8.93% of the population.

There were 700 households, out of which 31.4% had children under the age of 18 living with them, 37.3% were married couples living together, 20.1% had a female householder with no husband present, and 37.4% were non-families. 31.3% of all households were made up of individuals, and 17.4% had someone living alone who was 65 years of age or older. The average household size was 2.33 and the average family size was 2.90.

In the town, the population was spread out, with 24.6% under the age of 18, 10.2% from 18 to 24, 26.4% from 25 to 44, 22.0% from 45 to 64, and 16.8% who were 65 years of age or older. The median age was 37 years. For every 100 females, there were 78.7 males. For every 100 females age 18 and over, there were 71.8 males.

The median income for a household in the town was $32,368, and the median income for a family was $40,313. Males had a median income of $26,065 versus $23,269 for females. The per capita income for the town was $17,016. About 12.8% of families and 18.0% of the population were below the poverty line, including 28.6% of those under age 18 and 14.0% of those age 65 or over.

== Arts and culture ==
Milton has 198 contributing structures listed within its Federal Register Historic District. Significant buildings and sites are the Lydia Black Cannon Museum, the Governor James Carey home, the Chestnut Street Cemetery, and the Governor David Hazzard Mansion. The Hazzard House and Gov. James Ponder House were listed on the National Register of Historic Places in 1973. The Milton Historic District was added in 1982.

Milton serves local residents and summer tourists in the Milton, Broadkill Beach and Primehook Beach areas with family-operated businesses and new office and shopping complexes. Several local businesses in the area are served by the Delmarva Central Railroad, which operates a branch that extends to Milton from Ellendale. Recreational opportunities abound with the Broadkill River, Wagamon's Pond, Diamond Pond and Lavinia Pond. Public boat docks and fishing piers are also available. It is within an easy drive to the coastal resorts of Lewes and Rehoboth Beach, Delaware.

Milton is the home of the Dogfish Head Brewery, a well-known East Coast beer-maker.

== Parks and recreation ==
A footpath known as the Governors Walk follows the Broadkill River in central Milton. The Nature Conservancy established a preserve along the river downstream of Milton in 1998. As of 2005, an annual canoe and kayak race was being held on the river in Milton. The river passes through and feeds Prime Hook National Wildlife Refuge to the east before entering Delaware Bay.

== Education ==
It is in the Cape Henlopen School District. The Milton School District was consolidated into the Cape Henlopen district in 1969.

Two elementary schools, Milton Elementary School and H. O. Brittingham Elementary School, serve sections of Milton. The Mariner Middle School is middle school in the Cape Henlopen School District located in the town of Milton. Mariner is one of three middle schools in the district.

Cape Henlopen High School is the sole comprehensive high school of the district.

== Infrastructure ==
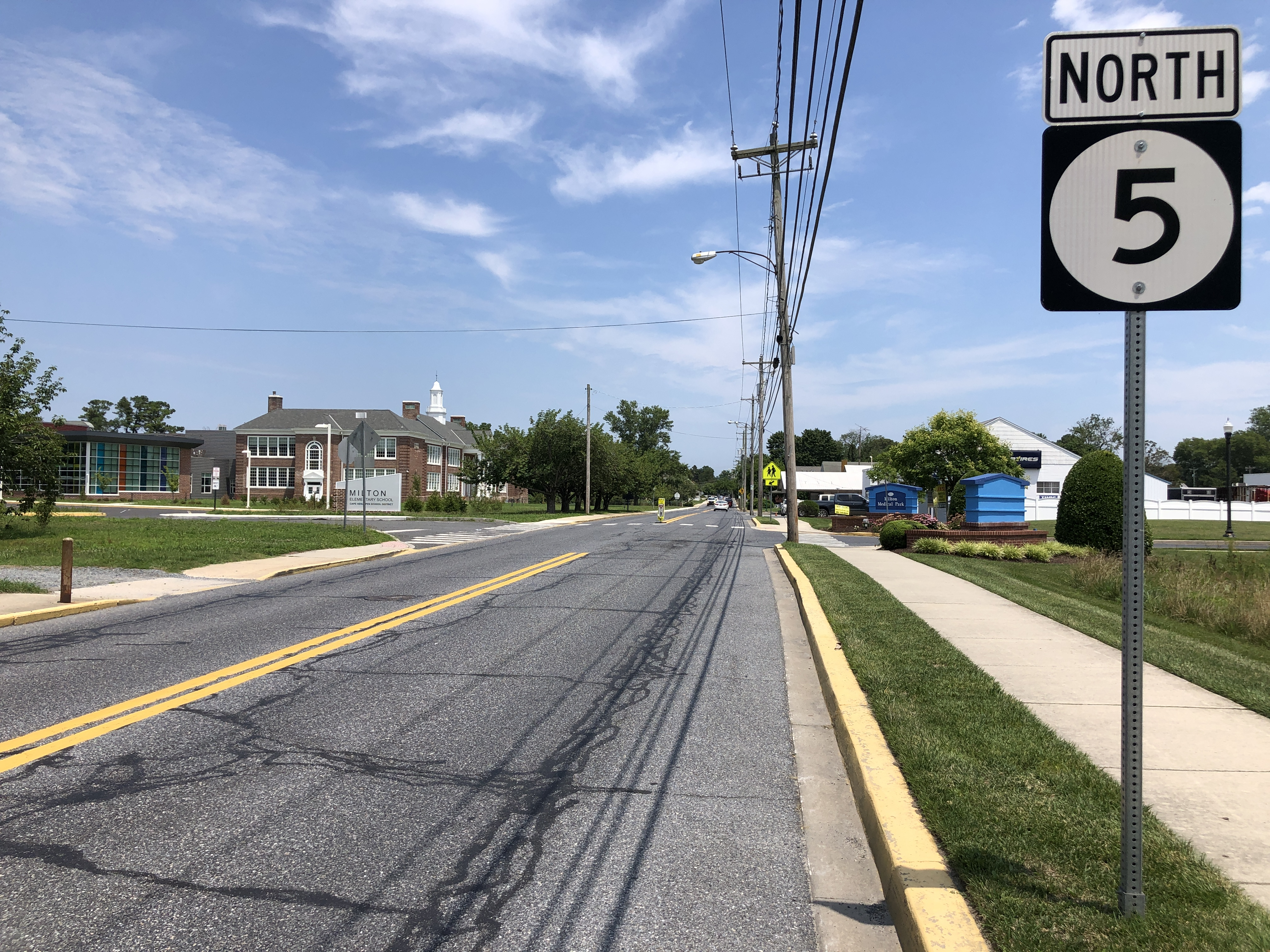
DE 5 northbound entering Milton

=== Transportation ===
Roads are the main means of transport to and from Milton. Delaware Route 5 is the main highway serving Milton, running on a north–south alignment through the center of town. Trucks are served by a bypass route, Delaware Route 5 Alternate, which bypasses downtown to the west. Delaware Route 16 also passes through Milton, skimming the north side of town on an east–west alignment. Delaware Route 30 passes just outside the town to the west, following a similar north–south alignment to parallel DE 5. DART First State provides bus service to Milton along Route 303, which runs north to Dover and south to Georgetown. The Delmarva Central Railroad's Milton Industrial Track line runs from Milton west to a junction with the Indian River Subdivision in Ellendale.

== Notable people ==
- Jimmie Allen, country singer
- Joseph M. Carey, Governor of Wyoming from 1911 to 1915
- David Hazzard (1781–1864), politician, Delaware Governor
- Robert G. Houston, publisher, lawyer, politician
- James Ponder (1819–1897), politician, Delaware Governor
- Bryan Stevenson, lawyer, activist, author, law professor; founder and executive director of Equal Justice Initiative based in Montgomery, Alabama

== Gallery ==
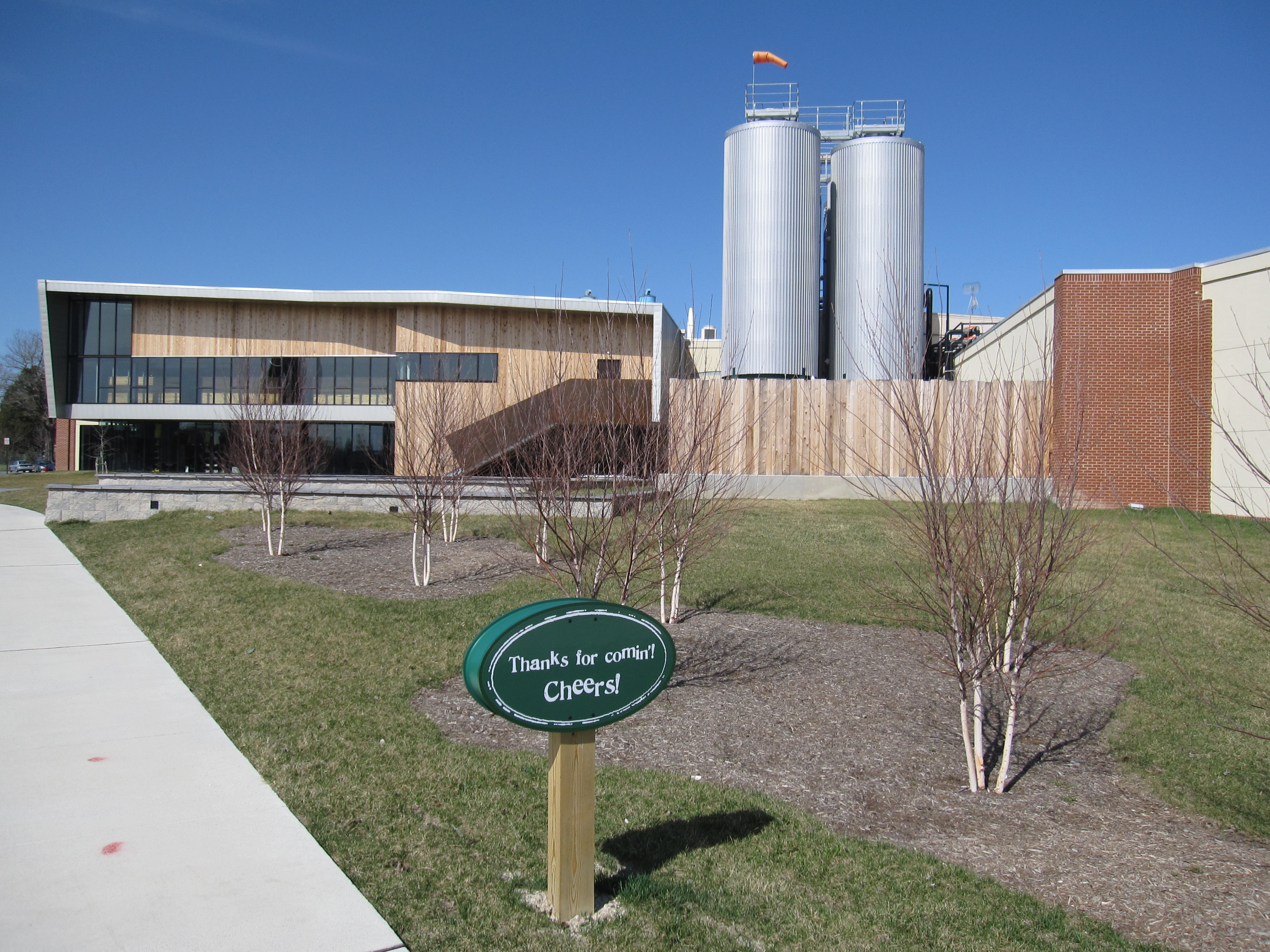
Dogfish Head Brewery in Milton

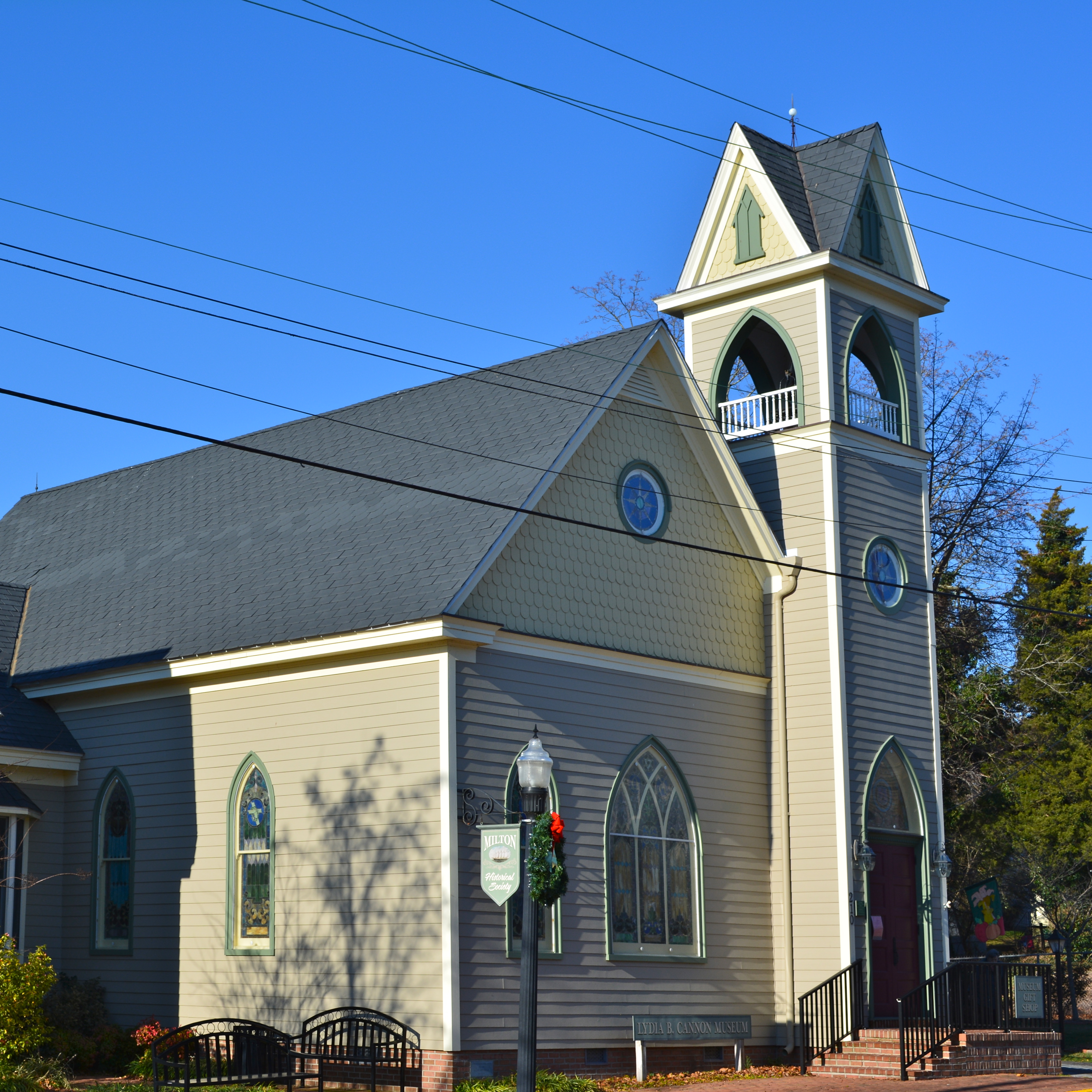
Milton Historical Society

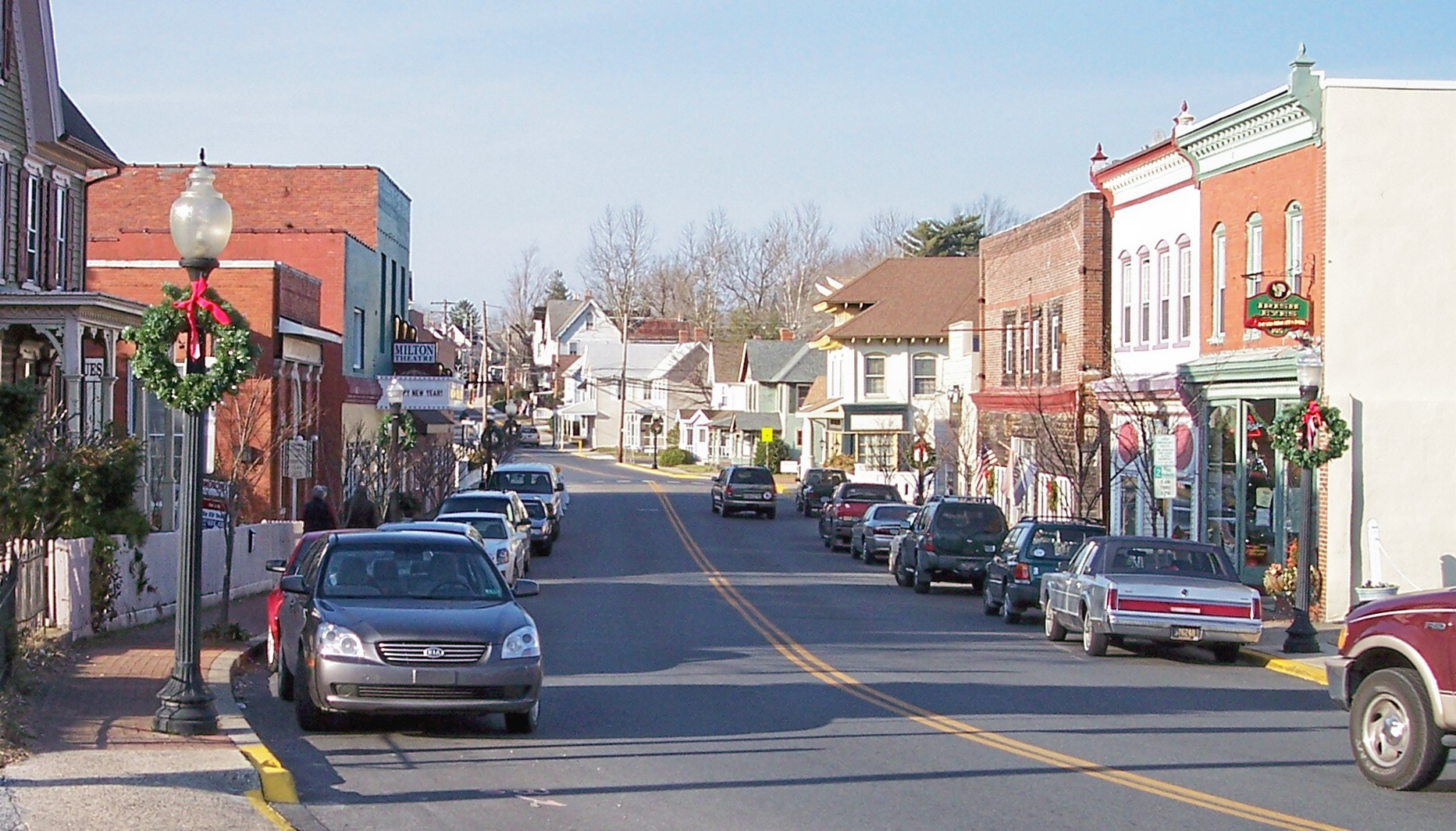
Federal Street in Milton in 2006

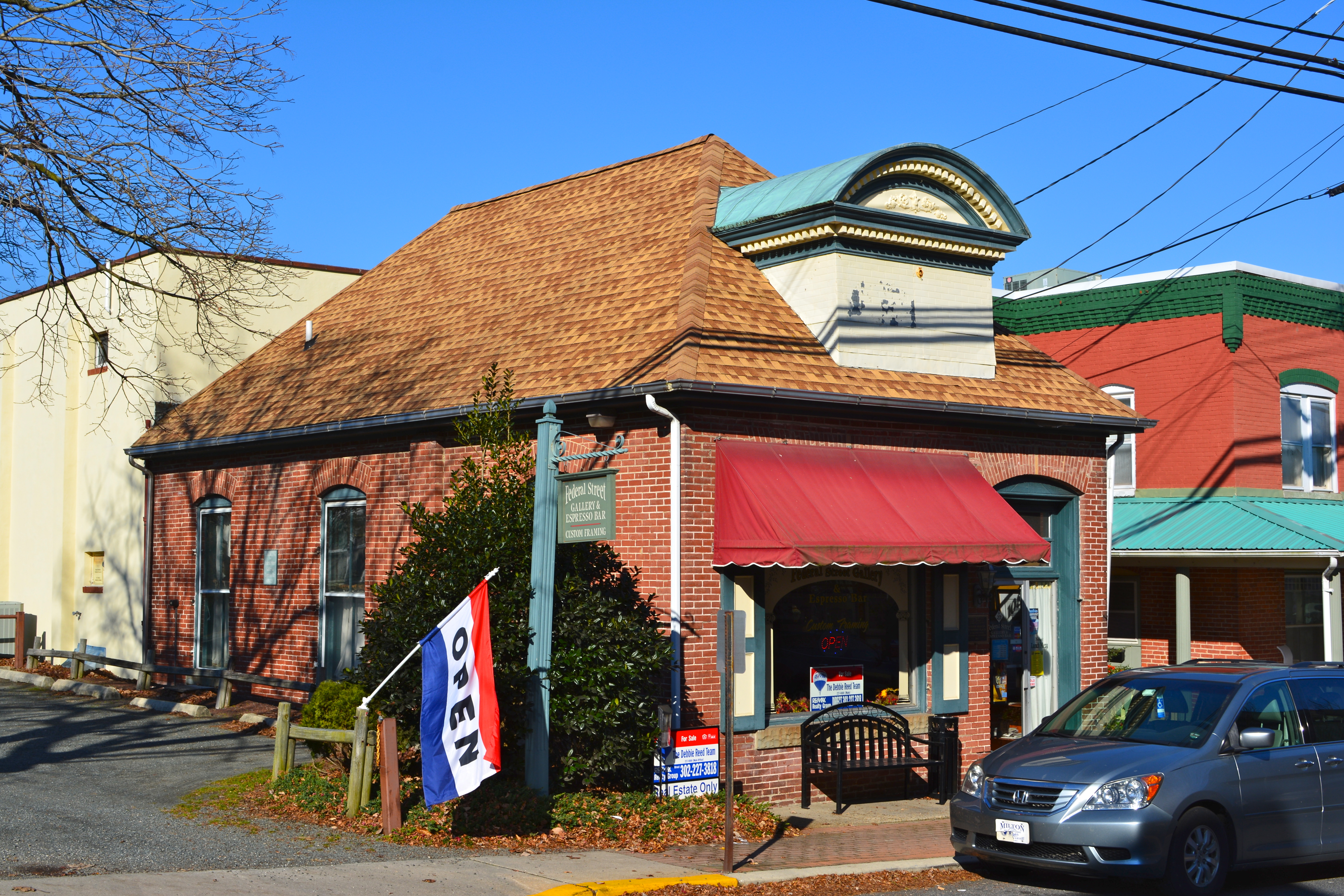
Federal Street Gallery & Espresso Bar
