= Willard Saulsbury Sr. =

American politician (1820–1892)

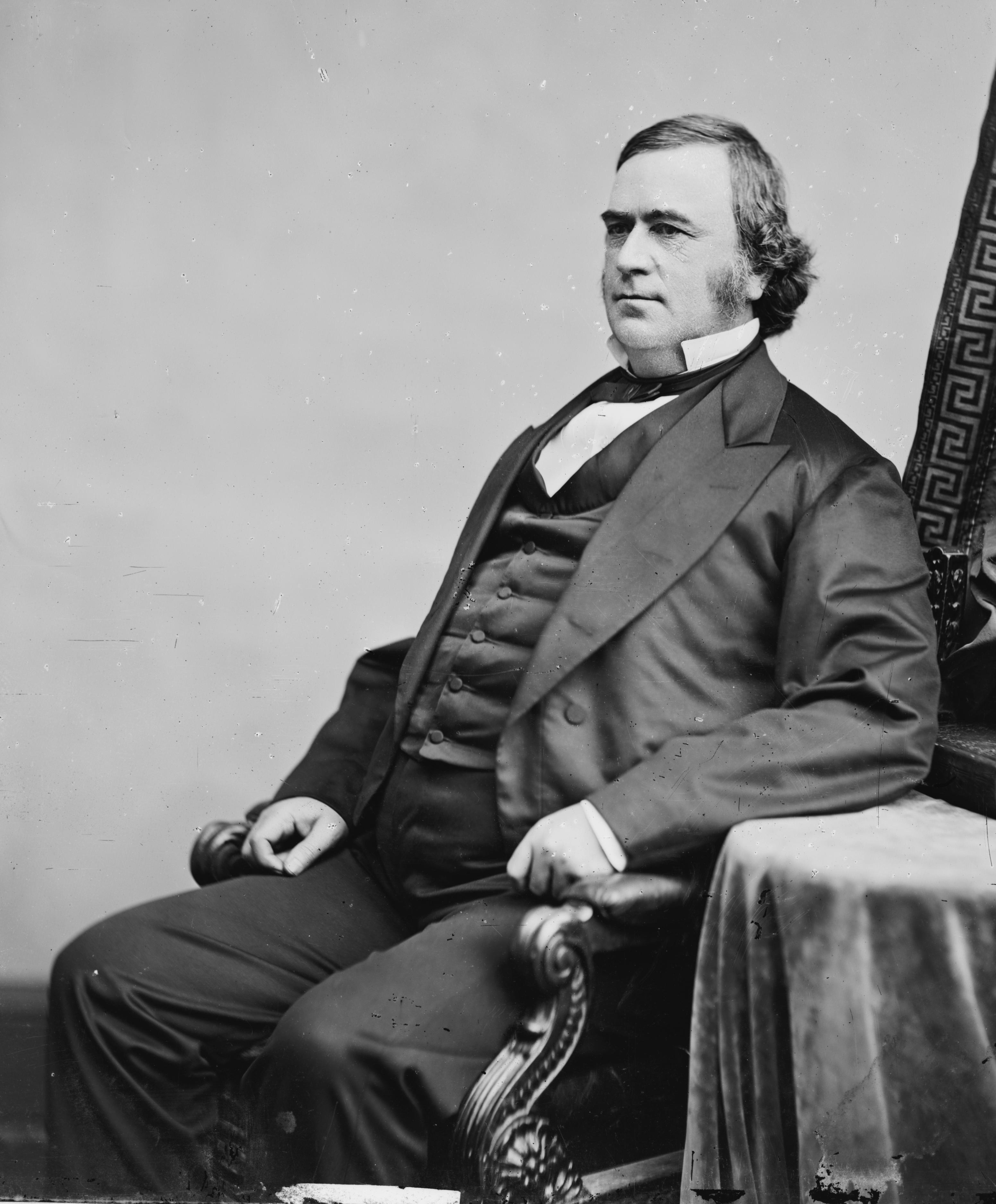

Chancellor of Delaware
- In office November 14, 1873 – April 6, 1892
- Preceded by: Daniel M. Bates
- Succeeded by: James L. Wolcott

United States Senator from Delaware
- In office March 4, 1859 – March 3, 1871
- Preceded by: Martin W. Bates
- Succeeded by: Eli Saulsbury

10th Attorney General of Delaware
- In office 1850–1855
- Governor: William Tharp; William H. H. Ross
- Preceded by: Edward W. Gilpin
- Succeeded by: George P. Fisher

Personal details
- Born: June 2, 1820 Kent County, Delaware
- Died: April 6, 1892 (aged 71) Dover, Delaware
- Party: Democratic
- Spouse: Annie Ponder
- Relations: Eli Saulsbury (brother); Gove Saulsbury (brother)
- Children: 3, including Willard Jr.
- Education: Delaware College
- Profession: Lawyer

Willard Saulsbury Sr. (June 2, 1820 – April 6, 1892) was an American lawyer and politician from Georgetown, Delaware. He was a member of the Democratic Party, who served as Attorney General of Delaware, U.S. Senator from Delaware and Chancellor of Court of Chancery of Delaware.

== Early life and family ==
Saulsbury was born in Mispillion Hundred, Kent County, Delaware, son of William & Margaret Ann Smith Saulsbury. He was a younger brother of Governor Gove Saulsbury and U.S. Senator Eli Saulsbury. According to a local Caroline County history, Willard and his brothers attended the Chinquapin School in Burrsville. He married Annie Ponder, sister of Governor James Ponder, and they had three children, John Ponder, Margaret, and Willard Jr. They were members of the Episcopal Church. Saulsbury was educated at Dickinson College and Delaware College, which is now the University of Delaware, studied law, was admitted to the Delaware Bar, and began his practice in Georgetown, Delaware. He was a slaveholder.

== Political career ==
Saulsbury was the Delaware Attorney General from 1850 until 1855, and was elected by the Delaware General Assembly to the United States Senate in 1858, defeating incumbent U.S. Senator Martin W. Bates. Saulsbury was reelected in 1864, but was defeated for a third term in 1870 by his older brother, Eli Saulsbury. He served two full terms from March 4, 1859, to March 4, 1871. He then continued his law practice and served as Chancellor of Delaware from 1873 until his death in 1892.

In 1863, Saulsbury was a vehement critic of President Abraham Lincoln's administration. Opposing the war in general and the suspension of habeas corpus specifically, Saulsbury attempted to prevent a vote sustaining that controversial executive order. Apparently intoxicated, Saulsbury verbally attacked the President on the Senate floor in what John Hay described as "language fit only for a drunken fishwife". Senator Saulsbury called Lincoln "an imbecile" and stated that the President was "the weakest man ever placed in a high office". When Vice President Hannibal Hamlin called Saulsbury to order, the Senator refused to take his seat. Finally, the Senate's sergeant-at-arms approached to remove Saulsbury from the Senate floor when the Senator suddenly brandished a revolver, placed it against the sergeant's head and said, "Damn you, if you touch me I'll shoot you dead!" Eventually, Saulsbury was calmed and removed from the Senate floor.

Saulsbury was one of six senators to oppose the Thirteenth Amendment to the United States Constitution.

== Death and legacy ==
Saulsbury died at Dover and is buried there in the Christ Episcopal Church Cemetery. His son Willard Saulsbury Jr. was also a U.S. Senator.

== Offices held ==
Public offices
Office	Type	Location	Began office	Ended office	Notes
Attorney General	Executive	Dover	1850	1855	Delaware
U.S. Senator	Legislature	Washington	March 4, 1859	March 3, 1865	
U.S. Senator	Legislature	Washington	March 4, 1865	March 3, 1871	
Chancellor	Judiciary	Dover	November 14, 1873	April 6, 1892	State Chancery Court

United States congressional service
Dates	Congress	Chamber	Majority	President	Committees	Class/District
1859–1861	36th	U.S. Senate	Democratic	James Buchanan		class 2
1861–1863	37th	U.S. Senate	Republican	Abraham Lincoln		class 2
1863–1865	38th	U.S. Senate	Republican	Abraham Lincoln		class 2
1865–1867	39th	U.S. Senate	Republican	Abraham Lincoln; Andrew Johnson		class 2
1867–1869	40th	U.S. Senate	Republican	Andrew Johnson		class 2
1869–1871	41st	U.S. Senate	Republican	Ulysses S. Grant		class 2
