= James Ponder =

American politician

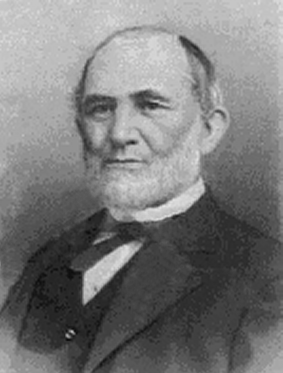

42nd Governor of Delaware
- In office January 17, 1871 – January 19, 1875
- Preceded by: Gove Saulsbury
- Succeeded by: John P. Cochran

Member of the Delaware Senate
- In office January 6, 1865 – January 6, 1869

Member of the Delaware House of Representatives
- In office January 6, 1857 – January 6, 1859

Personal details
- Born: October 31, 1819 Milton, Delaware
- Died: November 5, 1897 (aged 78) Milton, Delaware
- Party: Democratic
- Spouse: Sallie Waples
- Occupation: Merchant

James Ponder (October 31, 1819 – November 5, 1897) was an American merchant and politician from Milton in Sussex County, Delaware. He was a member of the Democratic Party, who served in the Delaware General Assembly and as Governor of Delaware.

== Early life and family ==
Ponder was born near Milton, Delaware, son of John and Hester Milby Ponder. He married Sallie Waples in 1851 and had four children: Ida, John, James Waples, and Anna. They lived at 414 Federal Street and were members of St. John the Baptist Episcopal Church in Milton. He inherited his father's business and expanded it into shipbuilding, agriculture, and banking.

== Professional and political career ==
Ponder was elected to the state house for the 1857/58 session and then to the state senate for the 1865/66 and 1867/68 sessions. He was Speaker during the 1867/68 session. In 1870 he was elected Governor of Delaware, defeating the Republican candidate, Thomas Boone Coursey. He served from January 17, 1871, until January 19, 1875.

The election of 1870 was the first opportunity for African-Americans to vote in Delaware elections, and Ponder's tenure was marred by an ongoing response to this change. Ponder himself was in no way sympathetic, saying to the General Assembly that the Federal government was wrong in extending the franchise to "uneducated Negroes." The 1870 election featured rigged voter lists that effectively denied the vote to most African-Americans, and resulted in all the seats in the General Assembly going to the Democratic Party. Two years later, in response, U.S. President Ulysses S. Grant sent in federal troops to police the elections, winning a few elections for Republicans, but undoubtedly prolonging the bitterness felt towards the federal government and their Republican followers in Delaware. The immediate result was the passage of a poll tax and the "Assessment Act of 1873," that effectively allowed tax collectors the ability to remove people from voter list, allegedly for not paying their taxes, and made it enormously complicated for the voter to have their name restored.

Ponder's term also featured the expansion of state offices into all of what is now known as the "old State House," and a thorough going restoration that included the first installation of heating and gas lights. The most controversial action of the term was Ponder's appointment of his brother-in-law, former U.S. Senator Willard Saulsbury as Chancellor of Delaware. Saulsbury had left the Senate as a disgraced alcoholic, and promised Ponder he would change his ways if he was appointed. Evidently Saulsbury kept his promise.

Delaware General Assembly (sessions while Governor)
Year	Assembly	Senate Majority	Speaker	House Majority	Speaker
1871–1872	76th	Democratic	Charles Gooding	Democratic	Sewell C. Biggs
1873–1874	77th	Democratic	Allen V. Leslie	Democratic	Joseph Burchenal

== Death and legacy ==
Ponder died at Milton and is buried there in the Methodist Episcopal Cemetery.

The Gov. James Ponder House at Milton was added to the National Register of Historic Places in 1973.

== Almanac ==
Elections are held the first Tuesday after November 1. Members of the Delaware General Assembly took office the first Tuesday of January. State senators have a four-year term and state representatives have a two-year term. The governor takes office the third Tuesday of January and has a four-year term.

Public Offices
Office	Type	Location	Began office	Ended office	notes
State Representative	Legislature	Dover	January 6, 1857	January 6, 1859	
State Senator	Legislature	Dover	January 6, 1865	January 6, 1869	
Governor	Executive	Dover	January 17, 1871	January 19, 1875	

Delaware General Assembly service
Dates	Assembly	Chamber	Majority	Governor	Committees	District
1856–1857	69th	State House	Democratic	Peter F. Causey		Sussex at-large
1865–1866	73rd	State House	Democratic	Gove Saulsbury		Sussex at-large
1867–1868	74th	State House	Democratic	Gove Saulsbury	Speaker	Sussex at-large

Election results
Year	Office	Subject	Party	Votes	%	Opponent	Party	Votes	%
1870	Governor	James Ponder	Democratic	11,464	56%	Thomas B. Coursey	Republican	9,130	44%

== Images ==
- Hall of Governors Portrait Gallery Portrait courtesy of Historical and Cultural Affairs, Dover.

== Places with more information ==
- Delaware Historical Society; website; 505 North Market Street, Wilmington, Delaware 19801; (302) 655–7161
- University of Delaware; Library website; 181 South College Avenue, Newark, Delaware 19717; (302) 831-2965

Party political offices
Preceded by Gove Saulsbury	Democratic nominee for Governor of Delaware; 1870	Succeeded by John P. Cochran
Political offices
Preceded by Gove Saulsbury	Governor of Delaware; 1871–1875	Succeeded by John P. Cochran
