= John P. Cochran =

American politician (1809–1898)

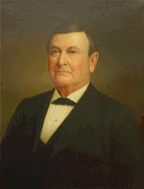

43rd Governor of Delaware
- In office January 19, 1875 – January 21, 1879
- Preceded by: James Ponder
- Succeeded by: John W. Hall

Personal details
- Born: February 7, 1809 Middletown, Delaware
- Died: December 27, 1898 (aged 89) Middletown, Delaware
- Party: Democratic
- Spouse(s): Eliza Polk; Mary Tumlin

John Price Cochran (February 7, 1809 – December 27, 1898) was an American politician from Middletown in New Castle County, Delaware. He was a member of the Democratic Party, who served as Governor of Delaware.

== Early life and family ==
Cochran was born in Appoquinimink Hundred, near Middletown, Delaware, son of Robert and Rebecca Ryland Cochran. He married Eliza Polk in 1833 and had seven children: William R., Clara Rebecca, Charles Polk, John Price Jr., Eliza, Julian, and Cyrus. His wife, Eliza died in childbirth in 1855 and he married secondly, Mary Tumlin. There were no known children of this marriage. They lived at "Cochran Grange," one mile west of Middletown and were members of the Presbyterian Church. He was a "leading farmer and fruit grower."

== Professional and political career ==
Cochran was elected to the New Castle County Levy Court in 1838 and 1846. In 1874 he was elected Governor of Delaware by defeating Isaac Jump, the Republican candidate and served from January 19, 1875, until January 21, 1879. He was the first governor from New Castle County in thirty years, and was regarded as a progressive governor, advocating improvements to the school law, and reapportionment of the General Assembly, to more fairly reflect the population of New Castle County. The reapportionment proposal was not approved. The General Assembly did, however, pass legislation requiring businesses serving the public "to provide equal accommodations for those who might be deemed obnoxious by others." This effort to deny civil rights to African-Americans was to remain on the books until 1963.

== Death and legacy ==
Cochran died at his home near Middletown and is buried in the Forest Presbyterian Cemetery at Middletown.

One of his former homes, Cochran Grange, survives today. Another, Summerton, inherited by his daughter Eliza Green, remained in the Green family until 1953, after which it had a succession of owners. In the mid-1980s and mid-2016, Summerton was considered for historic preservation, but such was opposed by its owner since 2012, Bluegrass Investments LLC, which kept the property vacant and arranged for its demolition and replacement by a Royal Farms convenience store and gas station. The involved real estate agent, Lisa Johannsen, in light of the 500 online signatures to stop the demolition, arranged for a farewell picnic.

== Almanac ==
Elections are held on the first Tuesday after November 1. The governor takes office the third Tuesday in January, and has a four-year term.

Delaware General Assembly (sessions while Governor)
Year	Assembly	Senate Majority	Speaker	House Majority	Speaker
1875-1876	78th	Democratic	Charles C. Stockley	Democratic	Thomas Holcomb
1877-1878	79th	Democratic	John T. Moore	Democratic	Hugh Martin

Public Offices
Office	Type	Location	Began office	Ended office	notes
Governor	Executive	Dover	January 19, 1875	January 21, 1879	

Election results
Year	Office	Subject	Party	Votes	%	Opponent	Party	Votes	%
1874	Governor	John P. Cochran	Democratic	12,488	53%	Isaac Jump	Republican	11,259	47%

== Images ==
- Hall of Governors Portrait Gallery . Portrait courtesy of Historical and Cultural Affairs, Dover

== Places with more information ==
- Delaware Historical Society; website; 505 North Market Street, Wilmington, Delaware 19801; (302) 655-7161
- University of Delaware; Library website; 181 South College Avenue, Newark, Delaware 19717; (302) 831-2965

Party political offices
Preceded by James Ponder	Democratic nominee for Governor of Delaware; 1874	Succeeded by John W. Hall
Political offices
Preceded by James Ponder	Governor of Delaware; 1875–1879	Succeeded by John W. Hall
