= Gove Saulsbury =

American politician

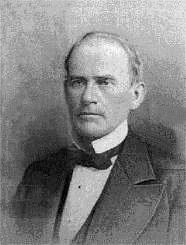

41st Governor of Delaware
- In office March 1, 1865 – January 17, 1871
- Preceded by: William Cannon
- Succeeded by: James Ponder

Member of the Delaware Senate
- In office January 6, 1863 – March 1, 1865

Personal details
- Born: May 29, 1815 Kent County, Delaware
- Died: July 31, 1881 (aged 66) Dover, Delaware
- Party: Democratic
- Spouse: Rosina Jane Smith
- Education: Delaware College; University of Pennsylvania
- Profession: Physician

Gove Saulsbury (May 29, 1815 – July 31, 1881) was an American medical doctor and politician from Dover, in Kent County, Delaware. He was a member of the Democratic Party, and he served in the Delaware General Assembly and as Governor of Delaware from 1865 to 1871. He led opposition to civil rights for African Americans in Delaware during the Reconstruction era.

== Early life and career ==
Saulsbury was born in Mispillion Hundred, Kent County, Delaware, son of William, the then-sheiff of Kent County, and Margaret Ann Smith Saulsbury. His father was a descendant of the Salusbury Family of Wales but changed the spelling of the name after the American Revolution due to his family's loyalist sympathies. He was the older brother of U.S. Senators Willard Saulsbury, Sr., and Eli Saulsbury, and he had two brothers with unknown names. He was also the uncle of U.S. Senator Willard Saulsbury, Jr. Gove later attended Delaware College in Newark, and he taught there for a short amount of time. He later graduated from the University of Pennsylvania Medical School in 1842 and established a practice at Dover. On November 1, 1848, he married Rosina Jane Smith and had five children: Margaret, Olivia Smith, Rosa, Gove, and William. He and his family were members of the Methodist Church. Saulsbury's choice of religious denomination sparked some controversy within the family as both of his brothers were staunch Episcopalians. In 1861 he was President of the Delaware Medical Society.

== Professional and political career ==
Saulsbury was elected to the Delaware State Senate in 1862 and served in the 1863–64 and 1865-66 sessions. A conservative Democrat opposed to any measures that would end slavery, Saulsbury established a reputation for himself as a determined opponent of Republican Governor William Cannon. He was the Speaker of the state senate in the 1865-66 session, and became Governor of Delaware when Governor Cannon died in office on March 1, 1865.

Governor Saulsbury was a white supremacist who opposed efforts to end slavery and extend civil rights to African Americans, stating in June 1865: "Ours is a government of white men, for the benefit of white men, and while we should ever act generously and kindly toward this, and all inferior and dependent races, duty to ourselves and our posterity, as well as proper regard for them, forbids that we should admit them to a participation of equal political rights." Strongly opposed to the Thirteenth Amendment which ended slavery, the Fourteenth Amendment which granted citizenship to former slaves, and the Fifteenth Amendment that extended voting rights to African-Americans, Saulsbury and the Democrats in the Delaware General Assembly took every possible step to frustrate their implementation and deny the new rights given to African-Americans. Delaware would not pass these amendments until many years later in 1901, long after they had come into effect nationwide.

Defeating his Republican opponent James Riddle in the 1866 Delaware gubernatorial election, Saulsbury was elected to a full term in his own right and continued in office until January 17, 1871. He was a delegate to the Democratic National Convention in 1876.

When Saulsbury's term as governor was over, he wanted to assume the U.S. Senate seat held by his brother, Willard Saulsbury. Willard had compromised himself with a well-known drinking problem, and many wanted him replaced. Unfortunately for Gove Saulsbury, the third brother, Eli Saulsbury also wanted the seat. After much balloting in the General Assembly, it became apparent to Willard that he could not win, so he switched his votes to Eli, who consequently won. Gove Saulsbury returned to his medical practice full-time.

== Death and legacy ==
Saulsbury died at Dover and is buried at Wesley Methodist Church Cemetery. He was President of the Delaware Medical Society in 1861, and in 1873 was one of the founders of Wesley College in Dover.

== General Assembly sessions ==
Delaware General Assembly (sessions while Governor)
Year	Assembly	Senate Majority	Speaker	House Majority	Speaker
1865–1866	73rd	Democratic	William Hitch	Democratic	Shephard P. Houston
1867–1868	74th	Democratic	James Ponder	Democratic	William A. Polk
1869–1870	75th	Democratic	James Williams	Democratic	John Hickman

== Offices and electoral history ==
Public Offices
Office	Type	Location	Began office	Ended office	notes
State Senator	Legislature	Dover	January 6, 1863	March 1, 1865	
Governor	Executive	Dover	March 1, 1865	January 15, 1867	acting
Governor	Executive	Dover	January 15, 1867	January 17, 1871	

Delaware General Assembly service
Dates	Assembly	Chamber	Majority	Governor	Committees	District
1863–1864	72nd	State Senate	Democratic	William Cannon		Kent at-large
1865–1866	73rd	State Senate	Democratic	William Cannon	Speaker	Kent at-large

Election results
Year	Office	Subject	Party	Votes	%	Opponent	Party	Votes	%
1866	Governor	Gove Saulsbury	Democratic	9,810	53%	James Riddle	Republican	8,598	47%

Party political offices
Preceded by Samuel Jefferson	Democratic nominee for Governor of Delaware; 1866	Succeeded by James Ponder
Political offices
Preceded by William Cannon	Governor of Delaware; 1865–1871	Succeeded by James Ponder
