= Little Creek =

Little Creek may refer to:

== Places in the United States ==
- Little Creek, Delaware, a town in Kent County
- Little Creek Hundred, Kent County, an unincorporated subdivision in Delaware
- Little Creek Hundred, Sussex County, an unincorporated subdivision in Delaware
- Little Creek, Georgia, an unincorporated community
- Little Creek Peak, a mountain in Utah
- Naval Amphibious Base Little Creek, a United States Navy base in Virginia Beach, Virginia

== Waterways ==
- Little Creek (Gualala River), a tributary of the Gualala River in California
- Little River (Delaware), also called Little Creek, a tributary of Delaware Bay
- Little Creek (North Fork River), a stream in Missouri
- Little Creek (Addition Creek tributary), a stream in Montana
- Little Creek (New Jersey), a river in Burlington County
- Little Creek (New York), a tributary of Cayuga Lake
- Little Creek (Cape Fear River tributary), a stream in Harnett County, North Carolina
- Little Creek (East Branch Tunkhannock Creek tributary), a creek in Pennsylvania
