= Little Creek Hundred =

Little Creek Hundred may refer to:

- Little Creek Hundred, Kent County, an unincorporated subdivision of Kent County, Delaware.
- Little Creek Hundred, Sussex County, an unincorporated subdivision of Sussex County, Delaware.

See List of Delaware Hundreds.
