= Gumboro =

Gumboro may refer to:

- Gumboro, Delaware
- Gumboro Hundred, an unincorporated subdivision of Sussex County, Delaware (see List of hundreds of Delaware)
