= Dagsboro =

Dagsboro may refer to:

- Dagsboro, Delaware
- Dagsboro Hundred, an unincorporated subdivision of Sussex County, Delaware; see List of Delaware Hundreds.
