= Milford Hundred =

Administrative subdivision in Delaware, United States

Coordinates: 38°55′32″N 75°25′44″W

Milford Creek Hundred
- Hundred
- Interactive map of Milford Creek Hundred
- Country: United States
- State: Delaware
- County: Kent
- Elevation: 26 ft (7.9 m)
- Time zone: UTC-5 (Eastern (EST))
  - Summer (DST): UTC-4 (EDT)
- Area code: 302
- GNIS feature ID: 217258

Milford Hundred is a hundred in Kent County, Delaware, United States. Originally part of Mispillion Hundred, the boundaries of which were Murderkill Creek on north and Mispillion Creek on south, extending from Delaware River to Maryland line. In 1830 Mispillion Hundred was divided into two hundreds, the western retaining the name Mispillion and the eastern being named Milford Hundred. Its primary community is Milford and included, , and .
