= Little Creek (Addition Creek tributary) =

Stream in Montana, U.S.

Coordinates: 47°53′09″N 113°33′39″W

Little Creek is a stream in the U.S. state of Montana. It is a tributary to Addition Creek.

According to tradition, Little Creek was named in celebration of the birth of firstborn child of forestry official Donald Bruce (himself namesake to Bruce Creek).
