= Kenton Hundred =

Administrative subdivision in Delaware, United States

Coordinates: 39°13′09″N 75°35′13″W

- Hundred
- Interactive map of Kenton Hundred
- Country: United States
- State: Delaware
- County: Kent
- Elevation: 62 ft (19 m)
- Time zone: UTC-5 (Eastern (EST))
  - Summer (DST): UTC-4 (EDT)
- Area code: 302
- GNIS feature ID: 217251

Kenton Hundred is a hundred in Kent County, Delaware, United States. Kenton Hundred was formed in 1869 from Duck Creek Hundred. Its primary community is Kenton.
