= Georgetown Hundred =

- Hundred
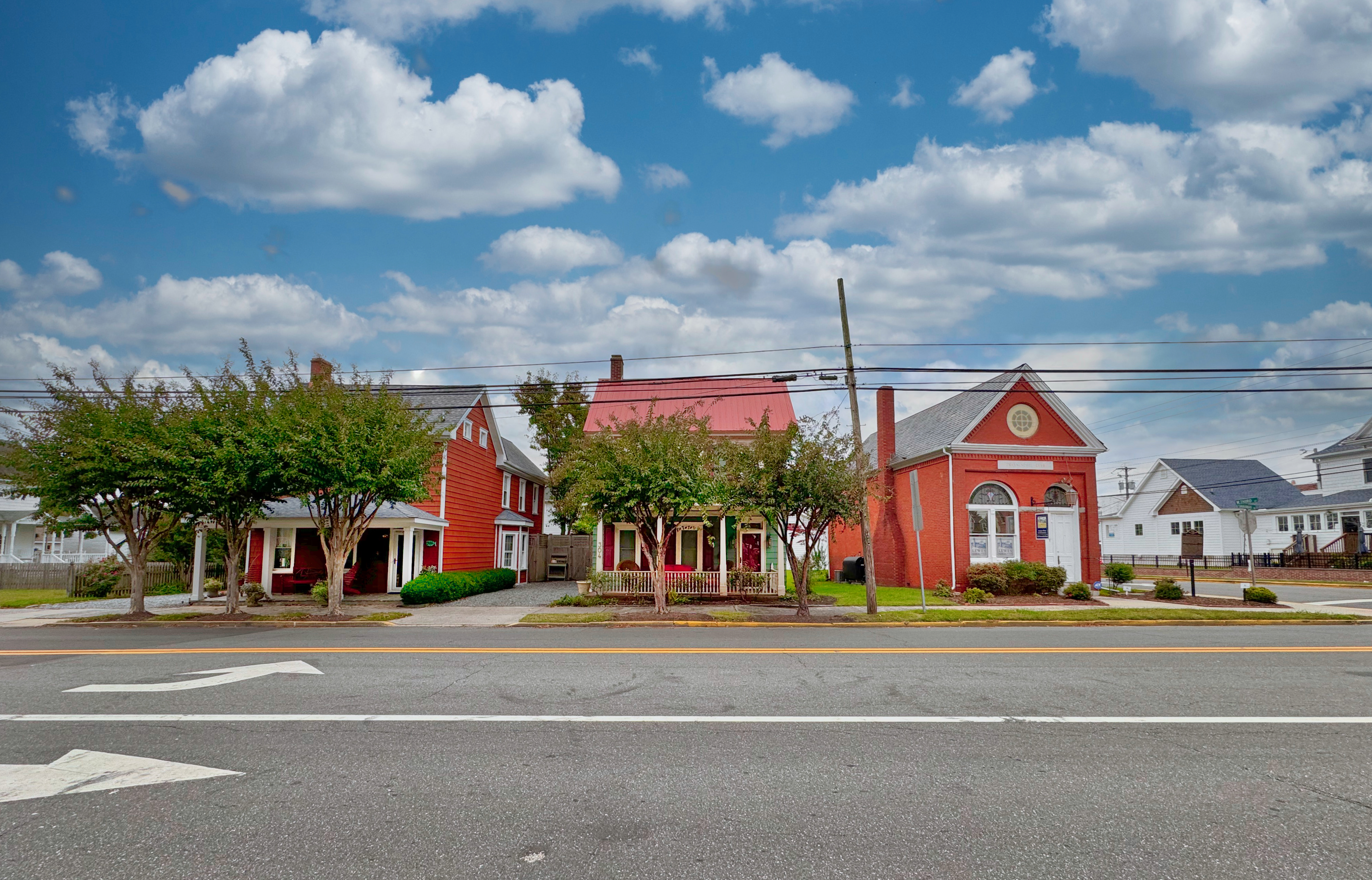
- Georgetown Hundred in 2023

- Location within Delaware
- Coordinates: 38°46′25″N 75°08′20″W
- Country: United States
- State: Delaware
- County: Sussex
- Elevation: 46 ft (14 m)
- Time zone: UTC-5 (Eastern (EST))
  - Summer (DST): UTC-4 (EDT)
- Area code: 302
- GNIS feature ID: 217202

Georgetown Hundred is a hundred in Sussex County, Delaware, United States. Georgetown Hundred was formed in 1863 from Broadkill Hundred. Its primary community is Georgetown.
