= Seaford =

Seaford may refer to:

== Places ==
=== Australia ===
- Seaford, Victoria
  - Seaford railway station, Melbourne
- Seaford, South Australia
  - Seaford railway station, Adelaide

=== Jamaica ===
- Seaford Town

=== United Kingdom ===
- Seaford, East Sussex
  - Seaford (UK Parliament constituency)
  - Seaford branch line
  - Seaford (Sussex) railway station

=== United States ===
- Seaford, Delaware
- Seaford, New York
  - Seaford (LIRR station)
- Seaford, Virginia
- Seaford Hundred, an unincorporated subdivision of Sussex County, Delaware

== People ==
- John Seaford, Anglican priest
- Richard Seaford, British classicist
- Baron Seaford, a UK peerage

== Sports ==
- Seaford Town F.C., an association football team in Seaford, East Sussex
- Seaford Football Club, an Australian rules football club
- Seaford Rangers FC, an association football team in Seaford, South Australia

== Other uses ==
- Seaford House, a building in London
- Seaford Museum, a museum in Seaford, East Sussex
- Short Seaford, a British flying boat
- HMS Seaford, the name of several ships of the Royal Navy

== See also ==
- Seaforde, a small village in Northern Ireland
- Sleaford, a market town in Lincolnshire, England
