= Bunker Creek =

Bunker Creek may refer to:

- Bunker Creek (Montana)
- Bunker Creek (New Hampshire)
