= Indian River Hundred =

- Hundred
- Location within Delaware
- Coordinates: 38°35′42″N 75°17′27″W
- Country: United States
- State: Delaware
- County: Sussex
- Elevation: 23 ft (7.0 m)
- Time zone: UTC-5 (Eastern (EST))
  - Summer (DST): UTC-4 (EDT)
- Area code: 302
- GNIS feature ID: 217262

Indian River Hundred is a hundred in Sussex County, Delaware, United States. Indian River Hundred was formed in 1706 from Lewes & Rehoboth Hundred. Its primary community is now Angola on Delaware Route 24, but maritime transportation dominated during the colonial and early federal era. Thus settlers as early as 1794 built a nearby chapel St. George's (now off Delaware Route 5) to serve their spiritual needs and as a community gathering place. By 1821 they paid to share a pastor with St. Peter's Church in Lewes, Delaware, as well as Old Christ Church (Laurel, Delaware), Prince George's Chapel in Dagsboro, Delaware and St. Pauls' Church in Georgetown, Delaware. By the late 20th century, fishing and farming had declined but tourism had increased, so the parish was linked to All Saints' Church in Rehoboth Beach.
