= 1924 United States presidential election in Minnesota =

- November 4, 1924

Nominee	Calvin Coolidge	Robert M. La Follette	John W. Davis
Party	Republican	Independent	Democratic
Alliance		Progressive
Home state	Massachusetts	Wisconsin	West Virginia
Running mate	Charles G. Dawes	Burton K. Wheeler	Charles W. Bryan
Electoral vote	12	0	0
Popular vote	420,759	339,192	55,913
Percentage	51.18%	41.26%	6.80%
County results
Coolidge
40–50%
50–60%
60–70%
La Follette
40–50%
50–60%
60–70%
President before election
Calvin Coolidge
Republican
Elected President
Calvin Coolidge
Republican

The 1924 United States presidential election in Minnesota took place on November 4, 1924, in Minnesota as part of the 1924 United States presidential election. Voters chose 12 electors, or representatives to the Electoral College, who voted for president and vice president.

A rapid recovery from the depression of 1920 and 1921, despite major Republican losses during the 1922 House elections placed the Republican Party – who gained a record popular-vote majority in the 1920 election – in a secure position despite the death of President Warren G. Harding in 1923. Rises in wages and ebbing of discontent further solidified the GOP's hold on power.

More critically, the Democratic Party was mortally divided between its rural Southern faction led by William Gibbs McAdoo and its white ethnic urban northeastern faction led by New York Governor Al Smith. The rural faction was supported by the revived Ku Klux Klan and was in favour of Prohibition, whereas the white ethnic faction was firmly against the anti-Catholic Klan and opposed to Prohibition. A fierce debate ensued that saw a compromise candidate, former Congressman John W. Davis of West Virginia, nominated after one hundred and three ballots in hot summer weather at Madison Square Garden. Although West Virginia was a border state whose limited African-American population had not been disenfranchised as happened in all former Confederate States, Davis did share the extreme social conservatism of Southern Democrats of his era. He supported poll taxes, opposed women's suffrage, and believed in strictly limited government with no expansion in nonmilitary fields.

In the liberal, heavily Scandinavian Upper Midwest, Davis' social and economic views had practically no appeal. Although in September Davis underwent an extensive tour of the region and of the Great Plains, and campaigned to eliminate the income tax burden of the poorer classes, he received a mere 6.80 percent of the vote in Minnesota. This constitutes the second-smallest proportion of any state's popular vote received by an official on-ballot (Note: In Wyoming, North Dakota, Colorado, Kansas and Idaho, Grover Cleveland was not on the ballot in 1892, whilst neither Harry S. Truman in 1948 nor Lyndon Johnson 1964 were on the ballot in Alabama.) Democratic presidential nominee since the election of 1860, when the party was divided. (Note: "Southern Democrat" John Cabell Breckinridge received less than Davis' 1924 Minnesota vote share in eleven free states, whilst "Northern Democrat" Stephen A. Douglas received a smaller proportion than Davis' 1924 Minnesota share in Florida, North Carolina, Pennsylvania, Mississippi, Maryland and Delaware.) The only smaller proportion was by Grover Cleveland in Nevada in 1892, when he received only 6.56 percent of the vote.

The conservatism of Coolidge and Davis made it inevitable that aging Wisconsin maverick Robert M. La Follette would mount a third-party challenge – which La Follette had planned even before the Democratic Convention. La Follette was formally nominated on July 4 by the "Conference for Progressive Political Action" and developed a platform dedicated to eliminating child labor and American interference in Latin American political affairs, along with a formal denunciation of the Ku Klux Klan. La Follette also proposed major judicial reforms including amendments allowing congress to override judicial review and to re-enact laws declared unconstitutional. La Follette also called for election of federal judges for ten-year terms.

Davis and Coolidge both spent most of their campaign attacking La Follette as a political extremist, but nonetheless opinion polls showed that La Follette was attracting large numbers of those German-American and Scandinavian-Americans who completely deserted Cox in 1920. In September some polls had La Follette winning sufficient electoral votes to give no candidate an electoral majority and force the House to make a choice, but as polling day approached newer polls suggested incumbent President Calvin Coolidge would hold the states of Minnesota, North Dakota, South Dakota, Nevada and Montana, which La Follette had been predicted to win in August. As it turned out, Coolidge won the state over La Follette by a margin of 81,567 votes, or 9.92 percent. Nationally, the incumbent president almost equalled Harding's landslide popular vote victory, achieving a 25.22 percent lead over Davis and 382 electoral votes.

== Results ==
1924 United States presidential election in Minnesota
Party	Candidate	Votes	Percentage	Electoral votes
Republican	Calvin Coolidge (incumbent)	420,759	51.18%	12
Independent	Robert M. La Follette	339,192	41.26%	0
Democratic	John W. Davis	55,913	6.80%	0
Workers	William Z. Foster	4,427	0.54%	0
Socialist Industrial	Frank T. Johns	1,855	0.23%	0
Totals		822,146	100.00%	12

=== Results by county ===
County	Calvin Coolidge Republican		John W. Davis Democratic		Robert M. La Follette Independent		William Z. Foster Workers		Frank Johns Socialist Industrial		Margin (Note: Because Coolidge and La Follette ran in the top two places in Minnesota and in every county within the state, all margins given are Coolidge vote minus La Follette vote and Coolidge percentage minus La Follette percentage.)		Total votes cast
County	#	%	#	%	#	%	#	%	#	%	#	%	Total votes cast
Aitkin	2,720	53.67%	212	4.18%	1,959	38.65%	159	3.14%	18	0.36%	761	15.02%	5,068
Anoka	3,146	57.15%	458	8.32%	1,883	34.21%	15	0.27%	3	0.05%	1,263	22.94%	5,505
Becker	2,936	45.51%	429	6.65%	2,963	45.92%	93	1.44%	31	0.48%	-27	-0.41%	6,452
Beltrami	2,960	46.22%	323	5.04%	3,053	47.67%	40	0.62%	28	0.44%	-93	-1.45%	6,404
Benton	1,629	41.90%	572	14.71%	1,644	42.28%	24	0.62%	19	0.49%	-15	-0.38%	3,888
Big Stone	1,524	46.14%	260	7.87%	1,508	45.66%	8	0.24%	3	0.09%	16	0.48%	3,303
Blue Earth	6,773	55.09%	1,123	9.13%	4,360	35.46%	24	0.20%	15	0.12%	2,413	19.63%	12,295
Brown	2,255	31.87%	270	3.82%	4,515	63.81%	21	0.30%	15	0.21%	-2,260	-31.94%	7,076
Carlton	3,142	49.76%	303	4.80%	2,552	40.42%	300	4.75%	17	0.27%	590	9.34%	6,314
Carver	2,214	40.20%	358	6.50%	2,907	52.78%	10	0.18%	19	0.34%	-693	-12.58%	5,508
Cass	2,800	54.13%	270	5.22%	2,052	39.67%	38	0.73%	13	0.25%	748	14.46%	5,173
Chippewa	2,140	42.29%	140	2.77%	2,761	54.57%	14	0.28%	5	0.10%	-621	-12.28%	5,060
Chisago	2,678	52.80%	135	2.66%	2,236	44.09%	12	0.24%	11	0.22%	442	8.71%	5,072
Clay	3,081	44.55%	439	6.35%	3,357	48.54%	21	0.30%	18	0.26%	-276	-3.99%	6,916
Clearwater	1,020	37.54%	86	3.17%	1,592	58.59%	12	0.44%	7	0.26%	-572	-21.05%	2,717
Cook	471	67.97%	29	4.18%	189	27.27%	2	0.29%	2	0.29%	282	40.70%	693
Cottonwood	2,722	56.99%	217	4.54%	1,818	38.07%	13	0.27%	6	0.13%	904	18.92%	4,776
Crow Wing	4,230	50.07%	417	4.94%	3,725	44.09%	57	0.67%	20	0.24%	505	5.98%	8,449
Dakota	3,931	42.34%	929	10.01%	4,378	47.16%	28	0.30%	18	0.19%	-447	-4.82%	9,284
Dodge	2,856	65.97%	215	4.97%	1,239	28.62%	10	0.23%	9	0.21%	1,617	37.35%	4,329
Douglas	2,424	39.15%	315	5.09%	3,430	55.39%	14	0.23%	9	0.15%	-1,006	-16.24%	6,192
Faribault	4,682	58.11%	578	7.17%	2,776	34.45%	12	0.15%	9	0.11%	1,906	23.66%	8,057
Fillmore	5,550	62.75%	460	5.20%	2,797	31.62%	19	0.21%	19	0.21%	2,753	31.13%	8,845
Freeborn	6,139	63.75%	480	4.98%	2,991	31.06%	9	0.09%	11	0.11%	3,148	32.69%	9,630
Goodhue	6,849	59.05%	615	5.30%	4,113	35.46%	11	0.09%	11	0.09%	2,736	23.59%	11,599
Grant	1,674	49.21%	118	3.47%	1,601	47.06%	3	0.09%	6	0.18%	73	2.15%	3,402
Hennepin	101,120	59.02%	10,806	6.31%	58,846	34.35%	377	0.22%	178	0.10%	42,274	24.67%	171,327
Houston	2,782	53.58%	402	7.74%	1,992	38.37%	13	0.25%	3	0.06%	790	15.21%	5,192
Hubbard	1,884	57.81%	191	5.86%	1,166	35.78%	12	0.37%	6	0.18%	718	22.03%	3,259
Isanti	1,588	39.54%	79	1.97%	2,332	58.07%	7	0.17%	10	0.25%	-744	-18.53%	4,016
Itasca	4,961	60.10%	496	6.01%	2,532	30.67%	232	2.81%	34	0.41%	2,429	29.43%	8,255
Jackson	2,760	48.96%	407	7.22%	2,446	43.39%	12	0.21%	12	0.21%	314	5.57%	5,637
Kanabec	1,507	47.57%	128	4.04%	1,521	48.01%	4	0.13%	8	0.25%	-14	-0.44%	3,168
Kandiyohi	3,222	40.16%	222	2.77%	4,552	56.74%	15	0.19%	11	0.14%	-1,330	-16.58%	8,022
Kittson	1,333	42.88%	249	8.01%	1,503	48.34%	17	0.55%	7	0.23%	-170	-5.46%	3,109
Koochiching	1,536	37.42%	222	5.41%	2,304	56.13%	34	0.83%	9	0.22%	-768	-18.71%	4,105
Lac qui Parle	2,860	52.26%	106	1.94%	2,481	45.33%	15	0.27%	11	0.20%	379	6.93%	5,473
Lake	1,251	46.63%	60	2.24%	1,319	49.16%	45	1.68%	8	0.30%	-68	-2.53%	2,683
Lake of the Woods	703	42.71%	92	5.59%	832	50.55%	10	0.61%	9	0.55%	-129	-7.84%	1,646
Le Sueur	2,475	38.19%	1,199	18.50%	2,756	42.52%	23	0.35%	28	0.43%	-281	-4.33%	6,481
Lincoln	1,657	48.03%	252	7.30%	1,511	43.80%	13	0.38%	17	0.49%	146	4.23%	3,450
Lyon	3,519	53.70%	334	5.10%	2,674	40.81%	10	0.15%	16	0.24%	845	12.89%	6,553
McLeod	2,841	44.89%	563	8.90%	2,893	45.78%	16	0.25%	16	0.25%	-52	-0.89%	6,329
Mahnomen	629	33.69%	122	6.53%	1,094	57.91%	13	0.70%	9	0.48%	-465	-24.22%	1,867
Marshall	2,100	40.03%	290	5.53%	2,812	53.88%	25	0.48%	19	0.36%	-712	-13.85%	5,246
Martin	4,238	56.24%	751	9.97%	2,529	33.50%	10	0.13%	7	0.09%	1,709	22.74%	7,535
Meeker	2,757	45.47%	365	6.02%	2,910	47.99%	20	0.33%	12	0.20%	-153	-2.52%	6,064
Mille Lacs	2,413	48.79%	167	3.38%	2,348	47.47%	10	0.20%	8	0.16%	65	1.32%	4,946
Morrison	3,128	41.63%	769	10.23%	3,546	47.19%	33	0.44%	38	0.51%	-418	-5.56%	7,514
Mower	5,061	55.69%	564	6.21%	3,436	37.81%	16	0.18%	11	0.12%	1,625	17.88%	9,088
Murray	2,034	45.80%	334	7.52%	2,048	46.12%	12	0.27%	13	0.29%	-14	-0.32%	4,441
Nicollet	2,518	50.05%	287	5.70%	2,208	43.89%	11	0.22%	7	0.14%	310	6.16%	5,031
Nobles	2,835	46.10%	421	6.85%	2,875	46.75%	9	0.15%	10	0.16%	-40	-0.65%	6,150
Norman	1,997	45.77%	171	3.92%	2,174	49.83%	16	0.37%	5	0.11%	-177	-4.06%	4,363
Olmsted	5,722	56.50%	857	8.46%	3,508	34.64%	27	0.27%	13	0.13%	2,214	21.86%	10,127
Otter Tail	7,557	55.45%	568	4.17%	5,346	39.23%	137	1.01%	21	0.15%	2,211	16.22%	13,629
Pennington	1,126	31.20%	146	4.05%	2,320	64.28%	13	0.36%	4	0.11%	-1,194	-33.08%	3,609
Pine	2,706	42.03%	469	7.28%	3,196	49.64%	44	0.68%	23	0.36%	-490	-7.61%	6,438
Pipestone	2,066	48.16%	219	5.10%	1,984	46.25%	14	0.33%	7	0.16%	82	1.91%	4,290
Polk	5,027	43.94%	663	5.80%	5,695	49.78%	37	0.32%	18	0.16%	-668	-5.84%	11,440
Pope	2,079	45.88%	151	3.33%	2,284	50.41%	8	0.18%	9	0.20%	-205	-4.53%	4,531
Ramsey	39,566	47.66%	8,407	10.13%	34,684	41.78%	262	0.32%	100	0.12%	4,882	5.88%	83,019
Red Lake	643	35.19%	213	11.66%	956	52.33%	11	0.60%	4	0.22%	-313	-17.14%	1,827
Redwood	3,342	50.66%	443	6.72%	2,778	42.11%	18	0.27%	16	0.24%	564	8.55%	6,597
Renville	3,405	42.66%	641	8.03%	3,898	48.84%	21	0.26%	16	0.20%	-493	-6.18%	7,981
Rice	5,883	61.26%	1,199	12.49%	2,454	25.55%	35	0.36%	32	0.33%	3,429	35.71%	9,603
Rock	2,065	51.98%	261	6.57%	1,637	41.20%	6	0.15%	4	0.10%	428	10.78%	3,973
Roseau	1,300	38.99%	148	4.44%	1,862	55.85%	13	0.39%	11	0.33%	-562	-16.86%	3,334
Saint Louis	37,033	57.31%	2,577	3.99%	23,166	35.85%	1,385	2.14%	462	0.71%	13,867	21.46%	64,623
Scott	1,324	29.29%	829	18.34%	2,327	51.48%	24	0.53%	16	0.35%	-1,003	-22.19%	4,520
Sherburne	1,961	63.65%	180	5.84%	925	30.02%	6	0.19%	9	0.29%	1,036	33.63%	3,081
Sibley	1,749	34.57%	341	6.74%	2,935	58.00%	21	0.42%	14	0.28%	-1,186	-23.43%	5,060
Stearns	6,469	37.36%	1,354	7.82%	9,385	54.20%	64	0.37%	42	0.24%	-2,916	-16.84%	17,314
Steele	3,598	59.50%	796	13.16%	1,632	26.99%	13	0.21%	8	0.13%	1,966	32.51%	6,047
Stevens	1,553	48.99%	238	7.51%	1,362	42.97%	12	0.38%	5	0.16%	191	6.02%	3,170
Swift	1,654	33.60%	334	6.79%	2,918	59.28%	9	0.18%	7	0.14%	-1,264	-25.68%	4,922
Todd	4,441	53.00%	557	6.65%	3,339	39.85%	17	0.20%	25	0.30%	1,102	13.15%	8,379
Traverse	1,002	39.32%	202	7.93%	1,330	52.20%	9	0.35%	5	0.20%	-328	-12.88%	2,548
Wabasha	2,834	44.93%	644	10.21%	2,811	44.57%	12	0.19%	6	0.10%	23	0.36%	6,307
Wadena	1,900	54.83%	182	5.25%	1,265	36.51%	109	3.15%	9	0.26%	635	18.32%	3,465
Waseca	2,081	37.13%	442	7.89%	3,057	54.54%	11	0.20%	14	0.25%	-976	-17.41%	5,605
Washington	4,482	52.40%	699	8.17%	3,351	39.18%	12	0.14%	9	0.11%	1,131	13.22%	8,553
Watonwan	2,297	53.57%	279	6.51%	1,703	39.72%	5	0.12%	4	0.09%	594	13.85%	4,288
Wilkin	1,342	47.17%	245	8.61%	1,250	43.94%	4	0.14%	4	0.14%	92	3.23%	2,845
Winona	5,670	43.53%	1,111	8.53%	6,183	47.47%	15	0.12%	47	0.36%	-513	-3.94%	13,026
Wright	4,349	47.52%	567	6.20%	4,172	45.59%	41	0.45%	22	0.24%	177	1.93%	9,151
Yellow Medicine	2,278	38.70%	151	2.56%	3,440	58.43%	13	0.22%	5	0.08%	-1,162	-19.73%	5,887
Totals	420,759	51.18%	55,913	6.80%	339,192	41.26%	4,427	0.54%	1,855	0.23%	81,567	9.92%	822,146

== Analysis ==
Given Davis' shocking statewide performance – not polling twenty percent in any of Minnesota's eighty-seven counties – this election would prove the last as of 2024 when Ramsey County has not voted Democratic, for La Follette's vote would turn to beaten Democratic nominee Smith in the following election and remain with the party for many decades.

With 41.26 percent of the popular vote, Minnesota would prove to be La Follette's third strongest state in the 1924 election in terms of popular vote percentage after Wisconsin and North Dakota.

== See also ==
- United States presidential elections in Minnesota
