= South Murderkill Hundred =

Administrative subdivision in Delaware, United States

- Hundred
- Location within Delaware
- Coordinates: 39°01′30″N 75°33′59″W
- Country: United States
- State: Delaware
- County: Kent
- Elevation: 66 ft (20 m)
- Time zone: UTC-5 (Eastern (EST))
  - Summer (DST): UTC-4 (EDT)
- Area code: 302
- GNIS feature ID: 217256

South Murderkill Hundred is a hundred in Kent County, Delaware, United States. South Murderkill Hundred was formed in 1855 from Murderkill Hundred. Its primary community is Felton.

== See also ==
- Murderkill/Motherkiln Friends Meeting
- North Murderkill Hundred
