= Thomas Rodney =

American politician (1744–1811)

Chief Justice of Mississippi
- In office August 1, 1803 – January 2, 1811

Associate Justice Delaware Supreme Court
- In office December 17, 1802 – August 1, 1803

Continental Congressman from Delaware
- In office November 4, 1785 – February 3, 1787
- In office April 8, 1784 – October 26, 1784
- In office February 10, 1781 – February 2, 1782

Personal details
- Born: June 4, 1744 Kent County, Delaware Colony
- Died: January 2, 1811 (aged 66) Natchez, Mississippi
- Party: Democratic-Republican

Thomas Rodney (June 4, 1744 – January 2, 1811) was an American lawyer and politician from Jones Neck in St. Jones Hundred, Kent County, Delaware, and Natchez, Mississippi. He was a Continental Congressman from Delaware, and a member of the Democratic-Republican Party who served in the Delaware General Assembly, as Justice of the Delaware Supreme Court, and as federal judge for the Mississippi Territory. He was the younger brother of Caesar Rodney, Founding Father and Revolutionary President of Delaware.

== Family and early life ==
Rodney was born June 4, 1744, at Byfield, his family's farm at Jones Neck, in Dover Hundred, Kent County, Delaware. It is just north of John Dickinson's mansion, Poplar Hall. He was the son of Caesar and Mary Crawford Rodney, and grandson of William Rodney, who came to America in the 1680s and had been Speaker of the Colonial Assembly of the Lower Counties in 1704. His mother was the daughter of the Rev. Thomas Crawford, Anglican priest at Dover. Byfield was an 800-acre (3.2 km^{2}) farm where the work was done by enslaved people, and with the addition of other adjacent properties, the Rodneys were, by the standards of the day, wealthy members of the local gentry. Sufficient income was earned from the sale of wheat and barley to the Philadelphia and West Indies market to provide enough cash and leisure to allow members of the family to participate in the social and political life of Kent County. Rodney's father died in 1745, when he was an infant, and his much older brother, Caesar Rodney, became much involved in his rearing and education.

== Political career ==
Rodney was very active in local politics, as well as the broader range of those elements affecting Delaware as whole. As early as 1770 he was a Justice of the Peace for Kent County and through the years he held many other local offices. He was a Colonel in the county's militia, and was involved in a number of actions during the American Revolutionary War.

In 1774 Thomas was a delegate to the state convention that elected his brother Caesar to be their delegate to the Continental Congress. Caesar went on to sign the Declaration of Independence. Meanwhile, Thomas was named to the state's Committee of Safety. Thomas in turn was sent as a delegate to the Congress in 1781 and 1782. He was elected to the Congress annually from 1785 to 1787, but attended sessions only in 1786. Through these same years Thomas was also a member in Delaware's state Assembly, and served as its Speaker of the House in 1787.

On December 17, 1802, Rodney became an associate justice of Delaware's Supreme Court. He would serve only until August 1803. He resigned since President Jefferson appointed him as the chief justice for the Mississippi Territory where he doubled as a land commissioner of the district west of Pearl River. He bought land in what was then Jefferson County, Mississippi, and moved to Natchez to assume his new duties as the senior federal judge for the Mississippi Territory from 1803 to 1811. Writing to his son, Caesar, he lamented in 1806 that the presidential appointments to the nascent government across the river in Louisiana had been disappointing as some of them were 'sots'. A Mississippi Territory grand jury failed to indict Aaron Burr and received a stern rebuke from Judge Rodney on February 3, 1807 due to its partisan action.

== Death and legacy ==
Thomas Rodney died January 2, 1811, at Natchez, Mississippi. The community of Rodney, in Jefferson County, Mississippi, is named in his honor. His son, Caesar A. Rodney, served as the U.S. representative from Delaware, U.S. senator from Delaware, U.S. attorney general and U.S. minister to Argentina.

== Public offices ==
At this time Delaware elections were held the first of October. Members of the House of Assembly took office on the twentieth day of October for a term of one year. Seven Assemblymen were elected, at large, from each county. The General Assembly chose the Continental Congressmen for a term of one year.

Office	Type	Location	Elected	Took office	Left office	Notes
Kent County Courts	Judiciary	New Castle		1770		Justice of the Peace
State House	Legislature	Dover	October 1, 1781	October 20, 1781	October 20, 1782	
Continental Congress	Legislature	Philadelphia	February 10, 1781	February 10, 1781	February 2, 1782	
Continental Congress	Legislature	Annapolis	April 8, 1784	April 8, 1784	June 3, 1784	never attended
Continental Congress	Legislature	New York	November 4, 1785	November 7, 1785	November 3, 1786	
State House	Legislature	Dover	October 1, 1786	October 20, 1786	October 20, 1787	
Continental Congress	Legislature	New York	October 27, 1786	November 6, 1786	October 30, 1787	never attended
State House	Legislature	Dover	October 1, 1787	October 20, 1787	October 20, 1788	Speaker
U.S. Judge	Judiciary	Natchez		1803	1811	Mississippi Territory
Land commissioner	Judiciary	Natchez		1802	1811	Mississippi Territory

== See also ==
- List of Mississippi Territory judges
