= Gumboro Hundred =

- Hundred
- Location within Delaware
- Coordinates: 38°35′42″N 75°17′27″W
- Country: United States
- State: Delaware
- County: Sussex
- Elevation: 39 ft (12 m)
- Time zone: UTC-5 (Eastern (EST))
  - Summer (DST): UTC-4 (EDT)
- Area code: 302
- GNIS feature ID: 217261

Gumboro Hundred is a hundred in Sussex County, Delaware, United States. Gumboro Hundred was formed in 1873 from Dagsboro Hundred.
