= Seaford Hundred =

- Hundred
- Location within Delaware
- Coordinates: 38°38′57″N 75°36′28″W
- Country: United States
- State: Delaware
- County: Sussex
- Elevation: 30 ft (9.1 m)
- Time zone: UTC-5 (Eastern (EST))
  - Summer (DST): UTC-4 (EDT)
- Area code: 302
- GNIS feature ID: 217201

Seaford Hundred is a hundred in Sussex County, Delaware, United States. Seaford Hundred was formed in 1869 from Northwest Fork Hundred. Its primary community is Seaford.
