= Addition Creek =

Stream in Montana, United States

Addition Creek Tributary to South Fork Flathead River
- Location of Addition Creek mouth Addition Creek (the United States)

Location
- Country: United States
- State: Montana
- County: Flathead

Physical characteristics
- Source: Bunker Creek divide
  - location: Bruce Mountain
  - coordinates: 47°51′22″N 113°36′18″W
  - elevation: 5,600 ft (1,700 m)
- Mouth: South Fork Flathead River
  - location: about 0.25 miles southwest of Horse Ridge
  - coordinates: 47°55′04″N 113°31′19″W
  - elevation: 3,614 ft (1,102 m)
- Length: 5.78 mi (9.30 km)
- Basin size: 17.43 square miles (45.1 km^{2})
- Discharge
  - location: South Fork Flathead River
  - average: 48.25 cu ft/s (1.366 m^{3}/s) at mouth with South Fork Flathead River

Basin features
- Progression: South Fork Flathead River → Flathead River → → Clark Fork → Pend Oreille River → Columbia River → Pacific Ocean
- River system: Flathead River
- Tributaries
  - left: Bruce Creek
  - right: Little Creek
- Bridges: NF-2826

Addition Creek is a stream in the U.S. state of Montana. It is a tributary to South Fork Flathead River.

According to tradition, Addition Creek was named in celebration of the wedding of forestry official Donald Bruce (namesake to Bruce Creek).

== Course ==
Addition Creek rises at Bruce Mountain in Flathead County, Montana, and then flows northwest to join South Fork Flathead River about 0.25 miles southwest of Horse Ridge.

== Watershed ==
Addition Creek drains 17.43 square miles (45.1 km^{2}) of area, receives about 54.3 in/year of precipitation, has a wetness index of 283.50, and is about 86% forested.
