= Broad Creek Hundred =

Coordinates: 39°39′46″N 75°33′40″W

- Hundred
- Interactive map of Broad Creek Hundred
- Country: United States
- State: Delaware
- County: Sussex
- Elevation: 39 ft (12 m)
- Time zone: UTC-5 (Eastern (EST))
  - Summer (DST): UTC-4 (EDT)
- Area code: 302
- GNIS feature ID: 217210

Broad Creek Hundred is a hundred in Sussex County, Delaware, United States. Broad Creek Hundred was formed in 1775 from Somerset County, Maryland. Its primary community is Bethel.
