= Dover Hundred =

Former administrative subdivision in Delaware

Dover Hundred was a hundred in Kent County, Delaware, United States. Dover Hundred was created in 1682 as St. Jones Hundred. It was renamed Dover Hundred in 1823. In 1859, Dover Hundred was divided into East Dover Hundred (39°06′44″N 75°44′42″W) and West Dover Hundred (39°39′32″N 75°34′04″W).
