= Murderkill Hundred =

Former administrative subdivision in Delaware, United States

Coordinates: 39°04′33″N 75°28′45″W

Murderkill Hundred was a hundred in Kent County, Delaware, United States. Murderkill Hundred was named after the Murderkill River, and created in 1682 as one of the original Delaware Hundreds. It was divided into North Murderkill Hundred and South Murderkill Hundred in 1855.
