= Nanticoke Hundred =

- Hundred
- Location within Delaware
- Coordinates: 38°38′40″N 75°36′33″W
- Country: United States
- State: Delaware
- County: Sussex
- Elevation: 39 ft (12 m)
- Time zone: UTC-5 (Eastern (EST))
  - Summer (DST): UTC-4 (EDT)
- Area code: 302
- GNIS feature ID: 217260

Nanticoke Hundred is a hundred in Sussex County, Delaware, United States. Nanticoke Hundred was formed in 1775 from Somerset County, Maryland.
