= Baltimore Hundred =

Coordinates: 38°33′23″N 75°12′10″W

- Hundred
- Interactive map of Baltimore Hundred
- Country: United States
- State: Delaware
- County: Sussex
- Elevation: 26 ft (7.9 m)
- Time zone: UTC-5 (Eastern (EST))
  - Summer (DST): UTC-4 (EDT)
- Area code: 302
- GNIS feature ID: 217267

Baltimore Hundred is a hundred in the southeastern section of Sussex County, Delaware, United States. Baltimore Hundred was formed in 1775 from Worcester County, Maryland. Its primary community is Millville. The old colonial term "hundred" is used to describe a sectioned area of the county in which 100 farms should fit. The Hundred was home to 3 villages, Selbyville, Roxanna and Ocean View.
