= Little Creek, Georgia =

Community in Haralson County, Georgia

Coordinates: 33°53′14″N 85°18′42″W

Little Creek is an unincorporated community in Haralson County, in the U.S. state of Georgia.

== History ==
A post office called Little Creek was established in 1876, and remained in operation until 1900. The community takes its name from a nearby stream of the same name.
