= Little Creek Hundred, Kent County =

Administrative subdivision in Delaware, United States

Little Creek Hundred
- Hundred
- Location within Delaware
- Coordinates: 39°14′32″N 75°35′15″W
- Country: United States
- State: Delaware
- County: Kent
- Elevation: 23 ft (7.0 m)
- Time zone: UTC-5 (Eastern (EST))
  - Summer (DST): UTC-4 (EDT)
- Area code: 302
- GNIS feature ID: 217252

Little Creek Hundred is a hundred in Kent County, Delaware, United States. Little Creek Hundred was formed in 1682 as one of the original Delaware Hundreds. Its primary community is Leipsic.

Little Creek Hundred is one of two Delaware hundreds of the name, the other being Little Creek Hundred in Sussex County.
