= Northwest Fork Hundred =

- Hundred
- Location within Delaware
- Coordinates: 38°44′45″N 75°36′59″W
- Country: United States
- State: Delaware
- County: Sussex
- Elevation: 52 ft (16 m)
- Time zone: UTC-5 (Eastern (EST))
  - Summer (DST): UTC-4 (EDT)
- Area code: 302
- GNIS feature ID: 217259

Northwest Fork Hundred is a hundred in Sussex County, Delaware, United States. Northwest Fork Hundred was formed in 1775 from Dorchester County, Maryland. Its primary community is Bridgeville.
