= West Dover Hundred =

Administrative subdivision in Delaware, United States

Coordinates: 39°09′33″N 75°33′28″W

- Hundred
- Interactive map of West Dover Hundred
- Country: United States
- State: Delaware
- County: Kent
- Elevation: 62 ft (19 m)
- Time zone: UTC-5 (Eastern (EST))
  - Summer (DST): UTC-4 (EDT)
- Area code: 302
- GNIS feature ID: 217254

West Dover Hundred is a hundred in Kent County, Delaware, United States. West Dover Hundred was formed in 1859 from Dover Hundred. Its primary community is Hartly.
