= East Dover Hundred =

Administrative subdivision in Delaware

Coordinates: 39.156154°N 75.484313°W

East Dover Hundred was a hundred in Delaware. Originally part of the Dover Hundred, it was formed in an 1877 division between two hundreds: the East Dover Hundred and West Dover Hundred. It was situated in what is today Kent County.
