= Mispillion Hundred =

Administrative subdivision in Delaware, United States

- Hundred
- Interactive map of Mispillion Hundred
- Coordinates: 38°57′0″N 75°36′29″W
- Country: United States
- State: Delaware
- County: Kent
- Elevation: 59 ft (18 m)
- Time zone: UTC-5 (Eastern (EST))
  - Summer (DST): UTC-4 (EDT)
- Area code: 302
- GNIS feature ID: 217257

Mispillion Hundred is a hundred in Kent County, Delaware, United States. Mispillion Hundred was formed in 1682 as one of the original Delaware Hundreds. Its primary community is Harrington. It originally embraced all lands south of Murderkill Creek and north of Mispillion Creek from Delaware River to Maryland line. In 1830 was divided into two approximately equal parts, the eastern part being called Milford Hundred and the western part retaining the name Mispillion.
