= Little Creek (North Fork River tributary) =

Stream in the American state of Missouri

Location
- Country: United States
- State: Missouri
- Region: Douglas, Texas and Wright counties

Physical characteristics
- Source
  - coordinates: 37°05′16″N 92°16′29″W
- Mouth
  - coordinates: 37°02′36″N 92°11′34″W
  - elevation: 1,010 ft (310 m)

Little Creek is a stream in Wright, Texas and Douglas counties of Missouri. It is a tributary of the North Fork River.

The stream headwaters are just east of Missouri Route 95 south of Mountain Grove in the southeast corner of Wright County. The stream enters the southwest corner of Texas County and flows southeast parallel to Little Creek Road. The stream enters northwest Douglas County and its confluence with the North Fork River is about one mile south of the Douglas - Texas county line.

Little Creek was named due to the fact it is smaller than other creeks in the area.

== See also ==
- List of rivers of Missouri
