= Bruce Creek (Addition Creek tributary) =

Stream in Montana, U.S.

Coordinates: 47°54′19″N 113°32′46″W

Bruce Creek is a stream in the U.S. state of Montana. It is a tributary to Addition Creek.

Bruce Creek was named after Donald Bruce, a forestry official.
