= 1860 United States presidential election in Delaware =

- November 6, 1860
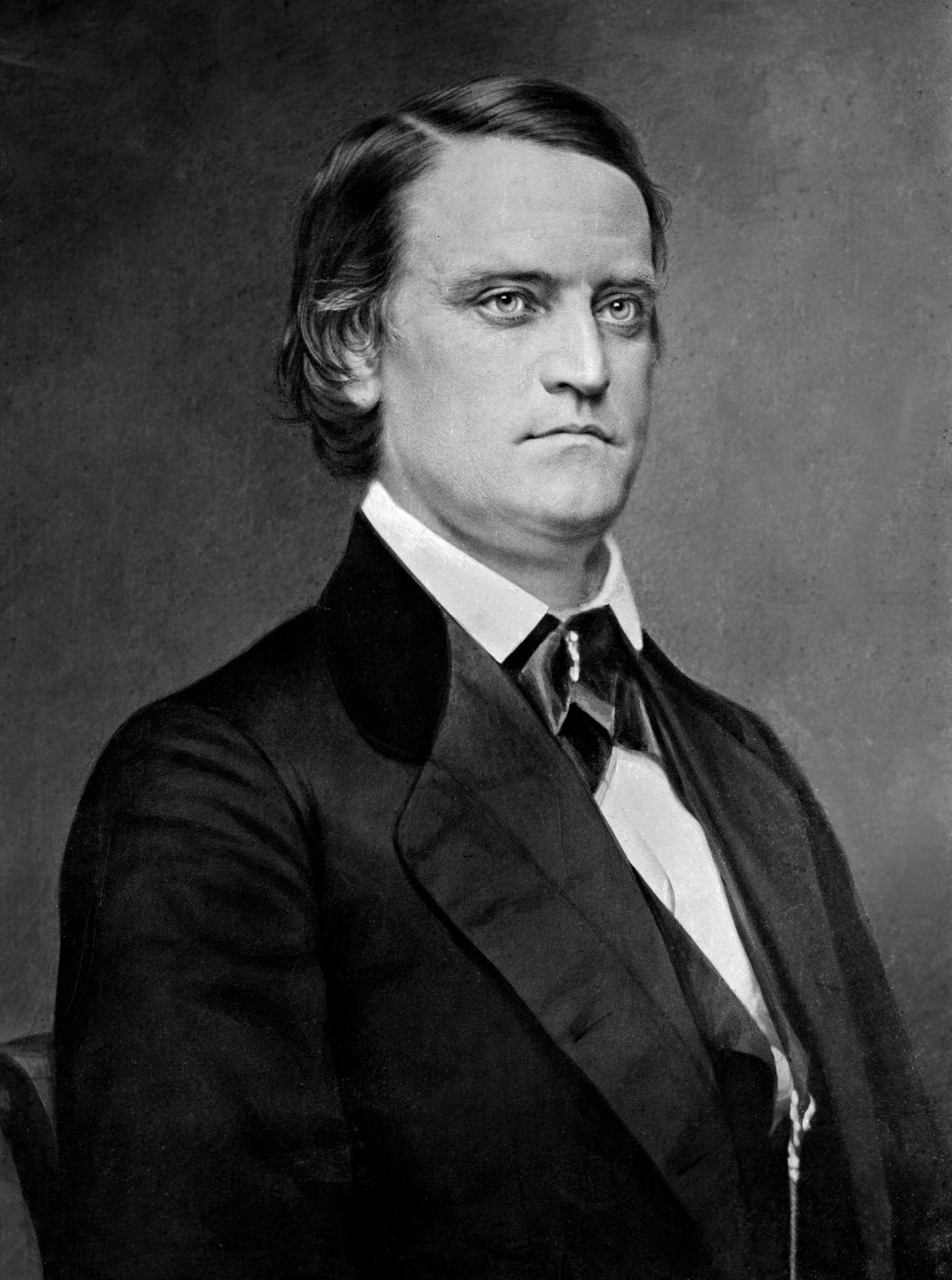

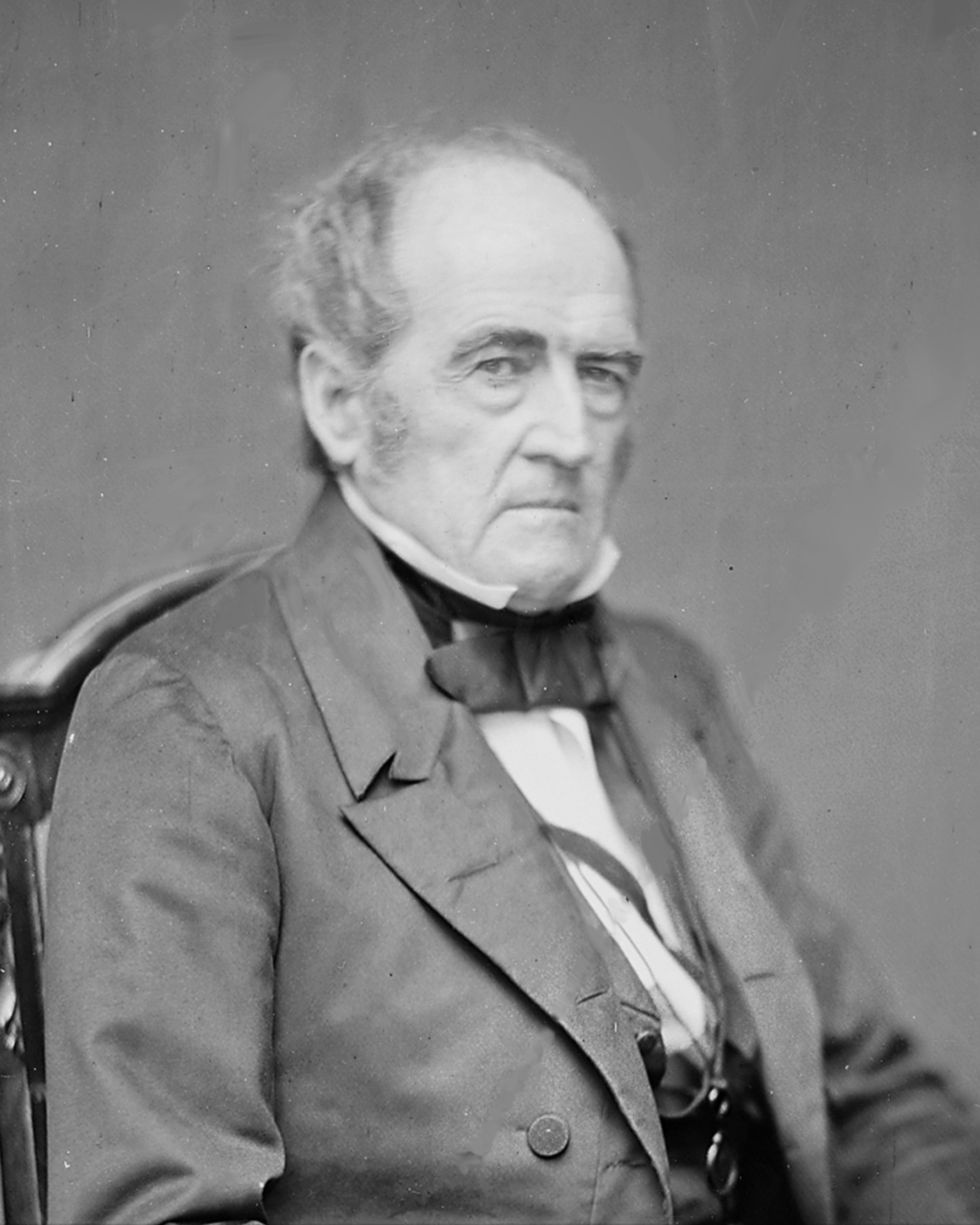

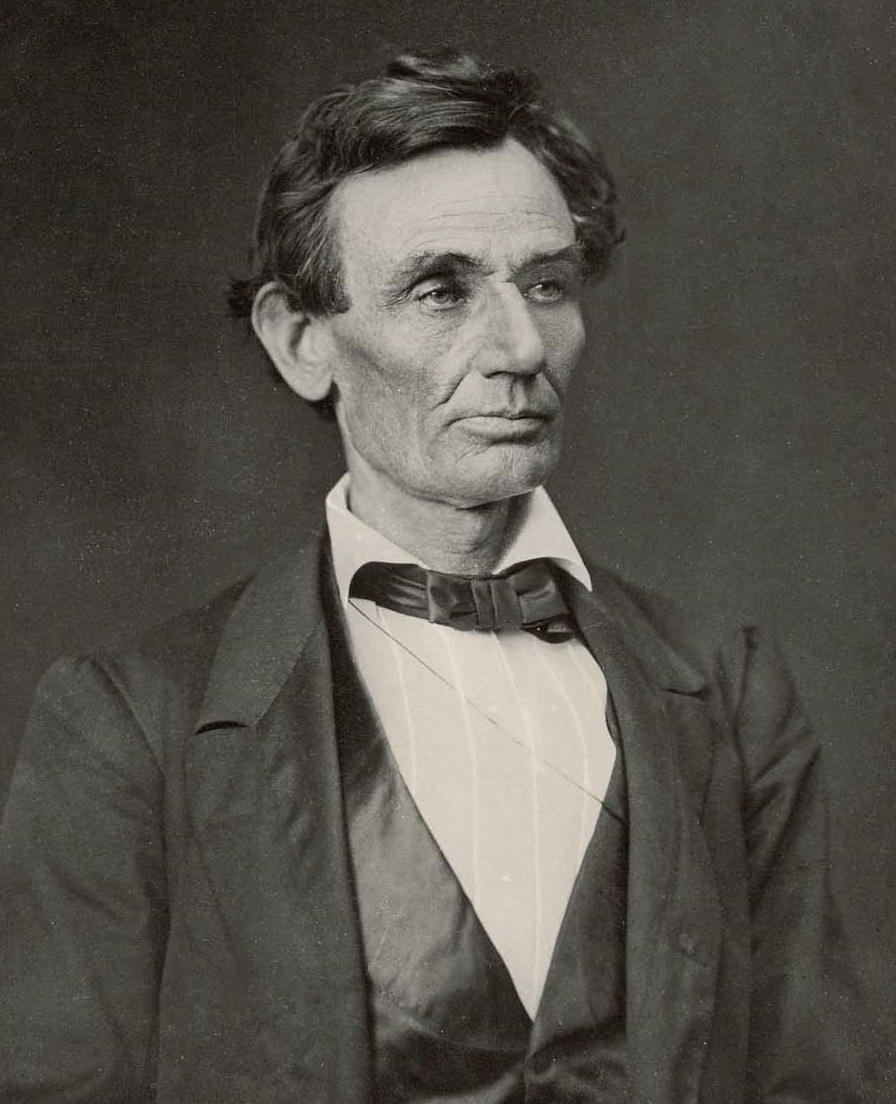

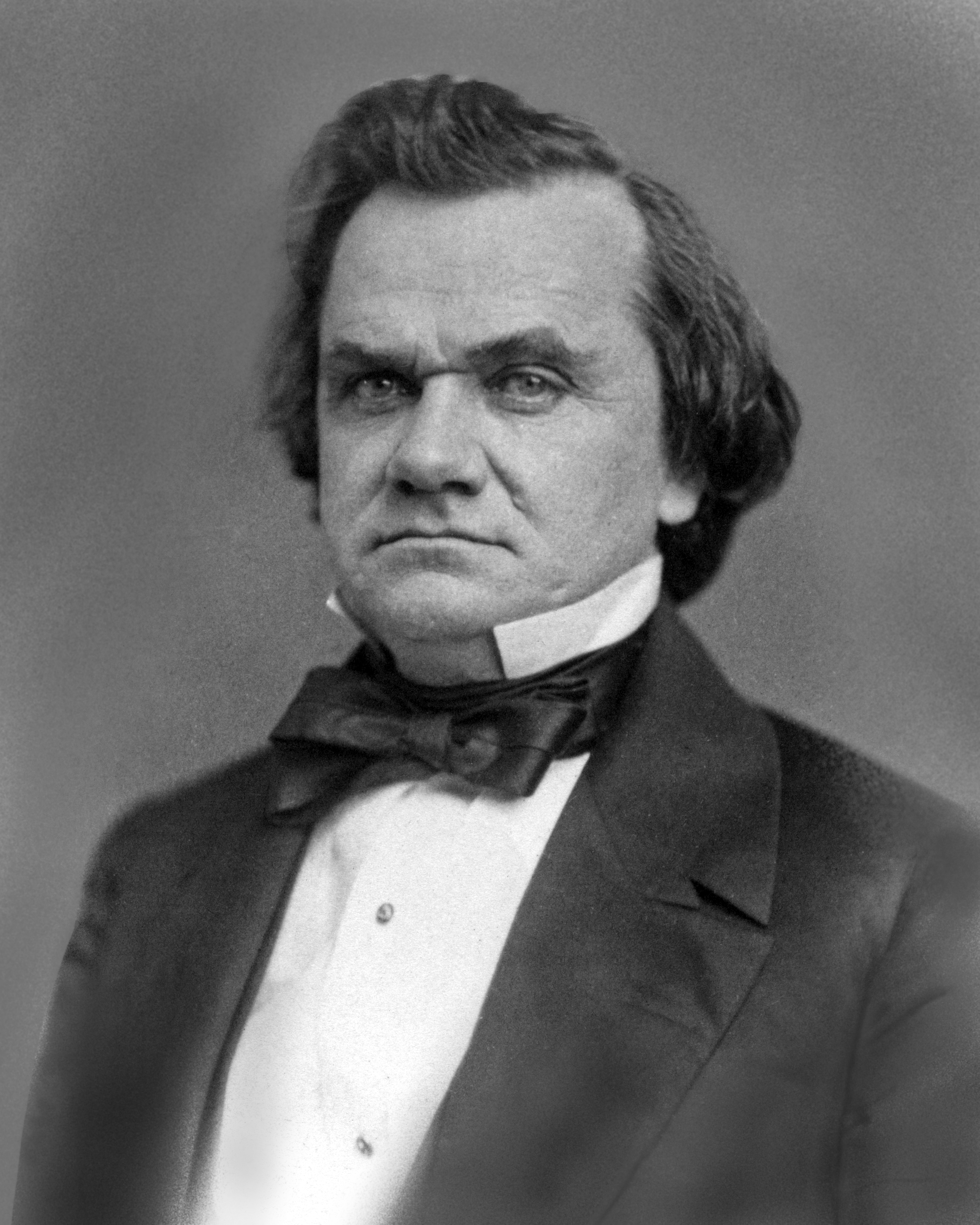
Nominee	John C. Breckinridge	John Bell
Party	Southern Democratic	Constitutional Union
Home state	Kentucky	Tennessee
Running mate	Joseph Lane	Edward Everett
Electoral vote	3	0
Popular vote	7,339	3,888
Percentage	45.54%	24.13%
Nominee	Abraham Lincoln	Stephen A. Douglas
Party	Republican	Democratic
Home state	Illinois	Illinois
Running mate	Hannibal Hamlin	Herschel V. Johnson
Electoral vote	0	0
Popular vote	3,822	1,066
Percentage	23.72%	6.61%
County results
Breckinridge
40–50%
50–60%
President before election
James Buchanan
Democratic
Elected President
Abraham Lincoln
Republican

The 1860 United States presidential election in Delaware took place on November 6, 1860, as part of the 1860 United States presidential election. State voters chose three representatives, or electors, to the Electoral College, who voted for president and vice president.

Delaware was won by the Southern Democratic candidate Vice President John C. Breckinridge of Kentucky and his running mate Senator Joseph Lane of Oregon. They defeated the Constitutional Union candidate Senator John Bell of Tennessee and his running mate Governor of Massachusetts Edward Everett, Republican candidate Illinois Representative Abraham Lincoln and his running mate Senator Hannibal Hamlin of Maine as well as Democratic candidate Senator Stephen A. Douglas of Illinois and his running mate Governor of Georgia Herschel V. Johnson. Breckinridge won the state by a margin of 21.41%.

The Republicans ran a slate of electors for Lincoln, but did not nominate any candidates for other federal and state offices. The party instead endorsed the candidates of the People's Party, an anti-Democratic coalition that supported the Republican presidential ticket.

== Campaign ==
=== Democrats ===
==== Charleston convention ====
Delaware selected its six delegates to the April 1860 Charleston convention through county-level Democratic conventions, with each county choosing two delegates.

New Castle County

- U.S. Senator James A. Bayard Jr.
- U.S. Representative William G. Whiteley

Sussex County

- U.S. Senator Willard Saulsbury Sr.
- Former Governor William H. H. Ross

Kent County

- State representative John Barr Pennington
- State representative John H. Bewley

Many southern delegates bolted the Charleston convention after the passage of the pro-Douglas minority convention platform. Bayard and Whitely, both hostile to Douglas, were among them. Bayard was elected as permanent chairman of the self-proclaimed "Constitutional Democratic” convention. The remaining four delegates stayed in the regular convention and voted for Robert M. T. Hunter of Virginia until the convention deadlocked and adjourned.

==== Baltimore convention ====
In late May 1860, New Castle County Democrats endorsed Bayard and Whiteley's walkout and re-elected them as delegates to the Baltimore convention. Douglas supporters organized their own county meeting and selected rival delegates Samuel Townsend and James A. Montgomery. The credentials committee at the Baltimore convention recommended seating Bayard and Whitely and this was approved by a convention vote.

==== General election ====
In the August 1860 Democratic state convention in Dover, Eli Saulsbury proposed nominating a slate of unpledged Democratic electors who would be free to support either Douglas or Breckinridge. Bayard, who controlled most of the convention delegates, rejected this compromise and pushed through a platform endorsing Breckinridge and nominating Benjamin T. Biggs for Delaware's at-large congressional seat.

Douglas Democrats, primarily concentrated in New Castle County, were initially open to a joint electoral slate, but the state convention's rejection of compromise pushed them to independently run a slate of Douglas electors and nominate Elias Reed for Delaware's at-large congressional seat.

=== People's party ===
In 1858, an anti-Democratic coalition known as the People's Party was organized in Delaware, composed of former Whigs, Know-Nothings, and Republicans. The People’s Party was divided over whether to support the Constitutional Unionists or the Republicans for president in 1860.

In April 1860, a People’s Party state convention in Dover voted not to send an official delegation to any national convention. However, the convention allowed party members to organize independently to elect delegates. As a result, members of the People’s Party represented Delaware at both the Constitutional Union convention in Baltimore and the Republican convention in Chicago.

In July 1860, the People's Party nominated George P. Fisher, a Bell supporter, for Delaware's at-large congressional seat. Delaware's Republicans and Constitutional Unionists each ran different slates of presidential electors for Lincoln and Bell respectively, but both supported Fisher and the local People’s Party candidates.

== Results ==
1860 United States presidential election in Delaware
Party	Candidate	Votes	%
Southern Democratic	John C. Breckinridge	7,339	45.54%
Constitutional Union	John Bell	3,888	24.13%
Republican	Abraham Lincoln	3,822	23.72%
Democratic	Stephen A. Douglas	1,066	6.61%
Total votes		16,115	100.00%

=== Results by county ===
1860 United States presidential election in Delaware
County	John C. Breckinridge Southern Democratic		John Bell Constitutional Union		Abraham Lincoln Republican		Stephen A. Douglas Democratic		Margin		Total votes cast
County	#	%	#	%	#	%	#	%	#	%	Total votes cast
Kent	2,081	51.78%	720	17.91%	1,075	26.75%	143	3.56%	1,006	25.03%	4,019
New Castle	3,004	40.75%	1,576	21.38%	2,073	28.12%	719	9.75%	931	12.63%	7,372
Sussex	2,254	47.71%	1,592	33.70%	674	14.27%	204	4.32%	662	14.01%	4,724
Total	7,339	45.54%	3,888	24.13%	3,822	23.72%	1,066	6.61%	3,451	21.41%	16,115

==== Counties that flipped from Democratic to Southern Democratic ====
- Kent
- New Castle
- Sussex

== See also ==
- United States presidential elections in Delaware

== Works cited ==
- Abbott, Richard (1986). The Republican Party and the South, 1855-1877: The First Southern Strategy. University of North Carolina Press. ISBN 0807816809.
