= Lewes and Rehoboth Hundred =

Coordinates: 38°43′59″N 75°14′38″W

Lewes & Rehoboth Hundred
- Hundred
- Interactive map of Lewes & Rehoboth Hundred
- Country: United States
- State: Delaware
- County: Sussex
- Elevation: 30 ft (9.1 m)
- Time zone: UTC-5 (Eastern (EST))
  - Summer (DST): UTC-4 (EDT)
- Area code: 302
- GNIS feature ID: 217263

Lewes & Rehoboth Hundred is a hundred in Sussex County, Delaware, United States. Lewes & Rehoboth Hundred was formed in 1692 as one of the original Delaware Hundreds. Its primary community is Lewes.
