= Little Creek Peak =

Mountain in the American state of Utah

- Location within Utah

Highest point
- Elevation: 10,145 ft (3,092 m) NAVD 88
- Prominence: 1,180 feet (360 m)
- Coordinates: 37°52′52″N 112°36′43″W

Geography
- Location: Iron County, Utah, U.S
- Parent range: Markagunt Plateau
- Topo map: USGS

Little Creek Peak is a mountain in eastern Iron County in southwestern Utah in the United States. the summit, at 10,145 feet (3,092 m) NAVD 88, is about 29 miles (47 km) northeast of Cedar City between I-15 and U.S. Route 89. The mountain is in the Dixie National Forest.
