= North Murderkill Hundred =

Administrative subdivision in Delaware, United States

Coordinates: 39°02′15″N 75°33′34″W

- Hundred
- Interactive map of North Murderkill Hundred
- Country: United States
- State: Delaware
- County: Kent
- Elevation: 39 ft (12 m)
- Time zone: UTC-5 (Eastern (EST))
  - Summer (DST): UTC-4 (EDT)
- Area code: 302
- GNIS feature ID: 217255

North Murderkill Hundred is a hundred in Kent County, Delaware, United States. North Murderkill Hundred was formed in 1855 from Murderkill Hundred. Its primary community is Camden.
