= Duck Creek Hundred =

Administrative subdivision in Delaware, United States

Coordinates: 39°09′28″N 75°31′27″W

- Hundred
- Interactive map of Duck Creek Hundred
- Country: United States
- State: Delaware
- County: Kent
- Elevation: 7 ft (2.1 m)
- Time zone: UTC-5 (Eastern (EST))
  - Summer (DST): UTC-4 (EDT)
- Area code: 302
- GNIS feature ID: 217211

Duck Creek Hundred is a hundred in Kent County, Delaware, United States. Duck Creek Hundred was formed in 1682 as one of the original Delaware Hundreds. Its primary community is Smyrna.
