= Broadkill Hundred =

- Hundred
- Location within Delaware
- Coordinates: 38°41′36″N 75°22′54″W
- Country: United States
- State: Delaware
- County: Sussex
- Elevation: 3 ft (0.91 m)
- Time zone: UTC-5 (Eastern (EST))
  - Summer (DST): UTC-4 (EDT)
- Area code: 302
- GNIS feature ID: 217204

Broadkill Hundred (later Broadkiln Hundred) is a hundred (unincorporated subdivision) in Sussex County, Delaware, United States. Broadkill Hundred was formed in 1696 as one of the original Delaware Hundreds. Originally known as Broadkill Hundred after the Broadkill River, the name was changed to Broadkiln Hundred in 1833 by the 57th Delaware General Assembly. Its primary community is Milton.
