= Dagsboro Hundred =

- Hundred
- Location within Delaware
- Coordinates: 38°33′N 75°18′W
- Country: United States
- State: Delaware
- County: Sussex
- Elevation: 36 ft (11 m)
- Time zone: UTC-5 (Eastern (EST))
  - Summer (DST): UTC-4 (EDT)
- Area code: 302
- GNIS feature ID: 217207
- Website: https://geonames.usgs.gov/pls/gnispublic/f?p=154:2:4278863065447025::NO:RP::

Dagsboro Hundred is a hundred in Sussex County, Delaware, United States. Dagsboro Hundred was formed in 1773 from Worcester County, Maryland. Its primary community is Millsboro.
