= Bunker Creek (Montana) =

Stream in Montana, U.S.

Coordinates: 47°49′47″N 113°24′59″W

Bunker Creek is a stream in the U.S. state of Montana. It is a tributary to the Flathead River.

Bunker Creek was named after Page S. Bunker, a forestry official.
