= Little Creek Hundred, Sussex County =

Administrative area in Delaware, US

Little Creek Hundred
- Hundred
- Location within Delaware
- Coordinates: 38°32′30″N 075°34′59″W
- Country: United States
- State: Delaware
- County: Sussex
- Elevation: 23 ft (7.0 m)
- Time zone: UTC-5 (Eastern (EST))
  - Summer (DST): UTC-4 (EDT)
- Area code: 302
- GNIS feature ID: 217203

Little Creek Hundred is a hundred in Sussex County, Delaware, United States. Little Creek Hundred was formed in 1774 from Somerset County, Maryland. Its primary community is Laurel.

Little Creek Hundred is one of two Delaware hundreds of the name, the other being Little Creek Hundred in Kent County.
