= Sussex County, Delaware =

County in Delaware, United States

- County of Delaware
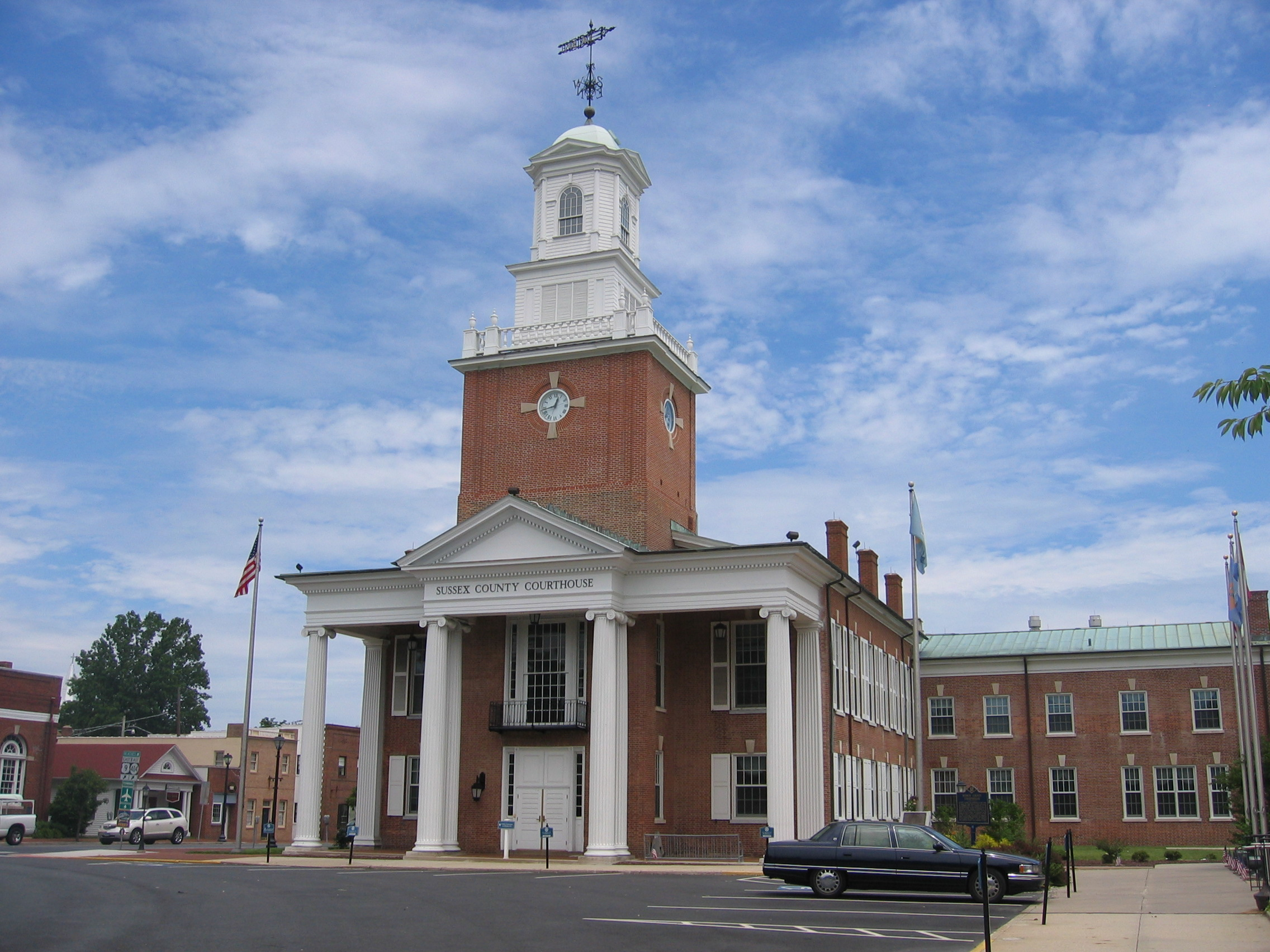
- Sussex County Courthouse in Georgetown

- Flag Seal

- Location within the U.S. state of Delaware
- Coordinates: 38°41′N 75°20′W
- Country: United States
- State: Delaware
- Founded: August 8, 1683
- Named for: Sussex, England
- Seat: Georgetown
- Largest city: Seaford

Area
  - Total: 1,196 sq mi (3,100 km^{2})
  - Land: 936 sq mi (2,420 km^{2})
  - Water: 260 sq mi (670 km^{2}) 21.7%

Population (2020)
  - Total: 237,378
  - Estimate (2025): 277,140 ▲
  - Density: 253.61/sq mi (97.92/km^{2})
- Time zone: UTC−5 (Eastern)
  - Summer (DST): UTC−4 (EDT)
- Congressional district: At-large
- Website: sussexcountyde.gov

Sussex County is a county in the southern part of the U.S. state of Delaware, on the Delmarva Peninsula. As of the 2020 census, the population was 237,378, making it the state's second most populated county behind New Castle and ahead of Kent. The county seat is Georgetown.

The first European settlement in the state of Delaware was founded by the Dutch in 1631 near the present-day town of Lewes on the Atlantic Coast. However, Sussex County was not organized until 1683 under English colonial rule.

Sussex County forms the Seaford, Delaware, Micropolitan Statistical Area.

== History ==
=== Beginnings ===
Archaeologists estimate that the first inhabitants of Sussex County, the southernmost county in Delaware, arrived between 10,000 and 14,000 years ago. Various indigenous cultures occupied the area, especially along the river and the coast, often having seasonal fishing villages. Historic Native Americans in Sussex County were members of Algonquian-speaking tribes, as were most coastal peoples along the Atlantic Coast.

By the historic period of European encounter, the most prominent tribes in the area were the Lenape, whose territory extended through the mid-Atlantic states to Connecticut and the future New York metropolitan area, and Nanticoke tribes. The people settled along the numerous bodies of water in the area where they were able to harvest fish, oysters, and other shellfish in the fall and winter. In the warmer months the women planted and cultivated crops, and processed the food. The men hunted deer and other small mammals, as larger game was not present in the area.

=== European discovery ===
There is no agreement on which European group was the first to settle in Sussex County. Historians believe that, in the early years of exploration from 1593 to 1630, Swedish explorers were likely the first Europeans to see the Delaware River and the lands of present-day Sussex County.

On an expedition for the Dutch West India Company, Henry Hudson recorded discovery in 1609 of what was later named the Delaware River. Attempting to follow him, Samuel Argall, an English explorer, was blown off course in 1610 and landed in a strange bay which he named after the Governor of Virginia, Thomas West, Lord De La Warr.

In the first half of 1613, Cornelius Jacobsen Mey, a Dutch navigator, discovered and named both Cape May and Cape Henlopen (originally Hindlopen) in the Delaware Bay. Later it was found that what May had named Henlopen was Fenwick Island, protruding into the Atlantic Ocean. The name of the cape was moved to its present location just east of Lewes.

=== European settlement ===
Sussex County was the site of the first European settlement in Delaware, a Dutch trading post named Zwaanendael at the present site of Lewes. On June 3, 1631, Dutch captain David Pietersen de Vries landed along the shores of the Delaware to establish a whaling colony in the mid-Atlantic of the New World. The colony lasted only until 1632, when De Vries left. Upon returning to Zwaanendael that December, he found that a local band of the Lenape tribe had killed the 32 Dutch settlers and burned the colony, after a misunderstanding escalated over Lenape defacement of the insignia of the governing Dutch West India Company. The Dutch set about settling the area once again.

Although the Dutch and Swedes returned to resettle the Delaware River region as early as 1638, much of the Delaware Bay area south of what is today the city of Newcastle was not settled until 1662. At that time, the city of Amsterdam made a grant of land at the Hoernkills (the area around Cape Henlopen, near the current town of Lewes) to a party of Mennonites. A total of 35 men were to be included in the settlement, led by a Pieter Cornelisz Plockhoy of Zierikzee, and funded by a sizable loan from the city to get them established. This settlement, established in 1663, was organized in part by the Dutch to respond to threats from the English colony of Maryland to the west beginning to assert rights over the area. The English wrested control of New Netherland from the Dutch in 1664 and they destroyed the Mennonite settlement that same year; English reports indicated that "not even a nail" was left there.

Settlement in the area after the English ejected the Dutch was slow. The Swedes and Finns who had settled in the area from the days of New Sweden had generally welcomed the English and were allowed to stay; the few Dutch found in the area were rounded up as prisoners and sent to Virginia as slaves. Lord Baltimore encouraged Marylanders to move east to settle the area. But the land was far removed from other, more established settlements and did not appeal to many new settlers. It was a tempting wilderness base for pirates to hide out from authorities and regularly pillage settlers for supplies.

The Dutch briefly recaptured the territory in 1673 as part of the Third Anglo-Dutch War. At that point, they established courts in the town of New Castle and at the Hoerkill at the southern end of the territory, effectively creating two counties out of the territory. After the war concluded in 1674, the Delaware territory was returned to the English. It was then placed under the control of James Stuart, Duke of York.

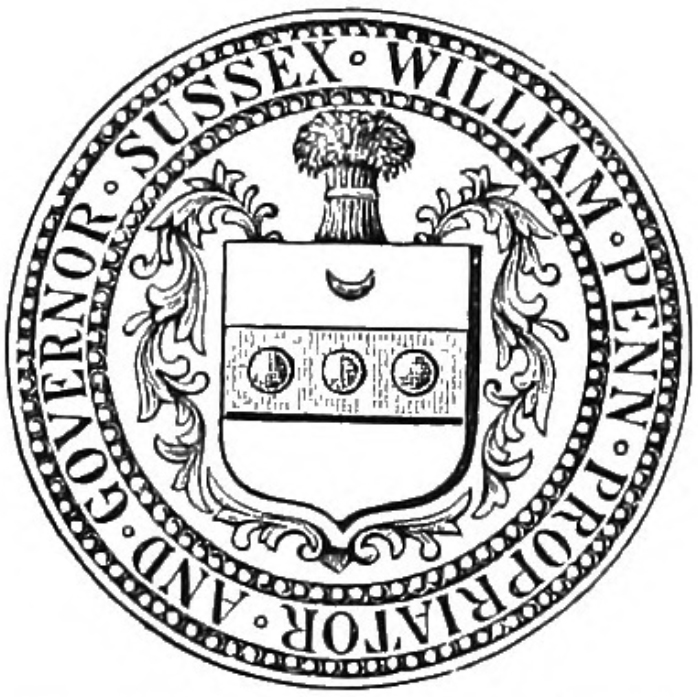
1683 Seal of Sussex County

In 1680, the Duke reorganized the territory south of the Mispillion River as Deale County with the county seat at New Deale (modern-day Lewes); and created a third county, St. Jones, out of the Delaware territory between the Mispillion River and Duck Creek. In 1682, English King Charles II awarded the Delaware territories to William Penn in settlement of family debts, and Penn reorganized all three Delaware counties: Deale County become Sussex County, and St. Jones County became Kent County, in recognition of Penn's homelands in the county of Sussex, England. He brought 200 people from Sussex, England as colonists. The town of New Deale was renamed Lewistown (today known as Lewes). At this time, Penn claimed that the Delaware territory extended as far south as Fenwick Island. The 'Three Lower Counties' (Delaware) along Delaware Bay were considered under Penn's sphere of settlement and became the Delaware Colony, a satellite of Pennsylvania.

But the boundary disputes continued between Pennsylvania and Maryland. Charles Calvert, 5th Baron Baltimore and William Penn both claimed the land between the 39th and 40th parallels, according to the charters granted to each colony. Whereas Penn claimed the Delaware territories extended to Fenwick Island, Calvert claimed the Maryland Colony ended at Lewes, with all the land south of the settlement belonging to Somerset County.

In 1732 Charles Calvert signed a territorial agreement with William Penn's sons that drew a line somewhere in between the two colonies and renounced Calvert's claim to Delaware. But Lord Baltimore later claimed that the document he signed did not contain the terms he had agreed to, and refused to put the agreement into effect. Beginning in the mid-1730s, violence erupted between settlers claiming various loyalties to Maryland and Pennsylvania. The border conflict between Pennsylvania and Maryland would be known as Cresap's War.

In 1750–1751, a team of surveyors from both colonies surveyed and marked the Transpeninsular Line, which established the southern boundary of Sussex County. However, residents of the disputed territory continued to pay taxes to Maryland into the 1770s.

The issue was unresolved until the Crown intervened in 1760, ordering Frederick Calvert, 6th Baron Baltimore to accept the 1732 agreement. As part of the settlement, the Penns and Calverts commissioned the English team of Charles Mason and Jeremiah Dixon to survey the newly established boundaries between the province of Pennsylvania, the province of Maryland, Delaware Colony and parts of Colony and Old Dominion of Virginia.

Between 1763 and 1767, Charles Mason and Jeremiah Dixon surveyed the Mason–Dixon line, settling Sussex County's western borders. After Pennsylvania abolished slavery in 1781, the western part of this line and the Ohio River became a border between free and slave states. Although Delaware remained a slave state, it already had a number of free blacks, and slaveholders manumitted more slaves in the first two decades after the Revolution.

The resolution of the boundary dispute enlarged Sussex County considerably, and the new territory was nicknamed New Sussex.

In 1769 a movement started to move the county seat from Lewes to the area then known as Cross Roads, the present day site of Milton. The current county seat of Georgetown was settled upon on January 27, 1791, after residents in western Sussex County successfully petitioned the Delaware General Assembly to move the county seat to a central location, as the limited roads at the time made it too difficult for outlying residents to reach the county seat in Lewes.

Georgetown was not a previously established town. On May 9, 1791, the 10 commissioners headed by President of the State Senate George Mitchell negotiated the purchase of 76 acres (310,000 m^{2}), and Commissioner Rhodes Shankland began the survey by laying out "a spacious square of 100 yards (91 m) each way." Eventually the town was laid out in a circle one mile (1.6 km) across. It was centered on the original square surveyed by Shankland, which is now listed on the National Register of Historic Places. Georgetown was named after Senate President George Mitchell.

Sussex County has been known by several names over the years, including Susan County, Hoorenkill or Whorekill County as named by the Dutch prior to 1680 when Kent County broke off. From 1680 to 1682 it was known as Deale County, after being taken over by the British under James Stuart, Duke of York prior to signing over to William Penn. It was called Durham County when claimed by the Lords Baltimore during the boundary dispute with the Penn family.

== Geography ==
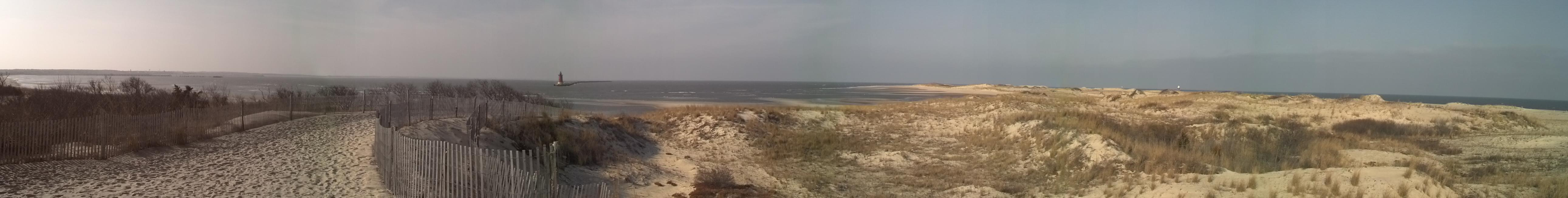
Cape Henlopen seen from Cape Henlopen State Park in Lewes

According to the U.S. Census Bureau, the county has a total area of 1,196 square miles (3,100 km^{2}), of which 936 square miles (2,420 km^{2}) is land and 260 square miles (670 km^{2}) (21.7%) is water. It is the largest county in Delaware by area. The county's land area comprises 48.0 percent of the state's land area. It is the second-highest percentage of territory of a state of any county in the United States.

Sussex County, like Delaware's two other counties, is subdivided into Hundreds. There are several explanations given for how the Hundreds were determined: as an area containing 100 families, an area containing 100 people, or an area that could raise 100 soldiers. Sussex County is apportioned into eleven Hundreds: Cedar Creek, Broadkill, Georgetown, Nanticoke, Northwest Fork, Broad Creek, Little Creek, Dagsboro, Baltimore, Indian River, and Lewes & Rehoboth.

The eastern portion of the county is home to Delaware's beaches on the Atlantic Coast and many seaside resorts. The western side of the county is the center of Delaware's agriculture, industry with more acres of arable land under cultivation than anywhere else in the state.

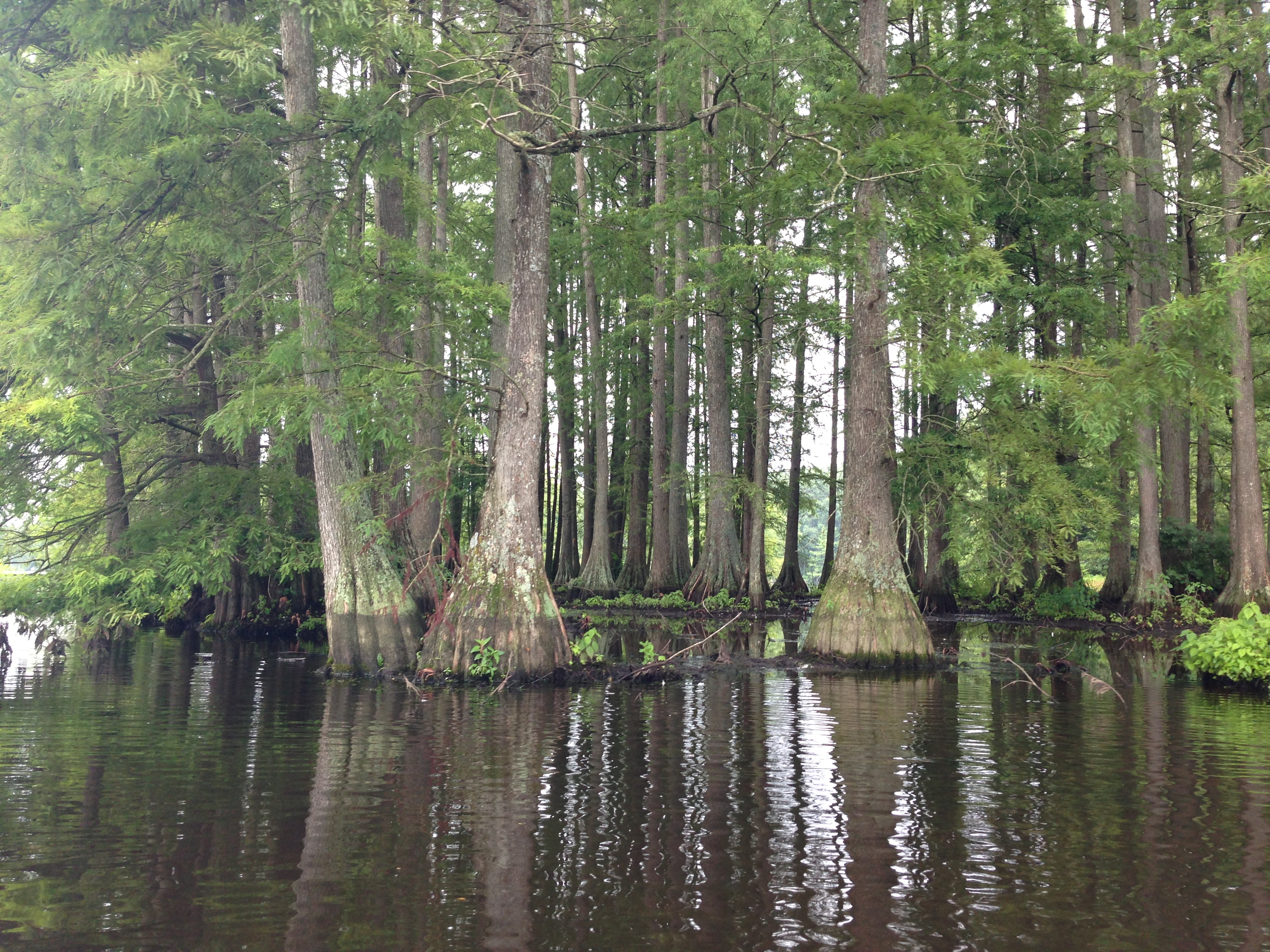
Cluster of bald cypress trees seen in Trap Pond State Park

Sussex County is home to an extensive system of Southern saltwater and freshwater wetlands, notably the Great Cypress Swamp. This massive freshwater swamp contains the northernmost strand of Bald Cypress trees in the United States.

Prime Hook National Wildlife Refuge is a 10,000 acres (40 km^{2}) along the western shore of Delaware Bay. The refuge contains a variety of habitats, including freshwater and salt marshes, woodlands, grasslands, ponds, and forested areas, supporting 267 species of birds and a variety of reptiles, amphibians and mammals.

=== Adjacent counties ===
- Kent County – north
- Cape May County, New Jersey – northeast
- Worcester County, Maryland – south
- Dorchester County, Maryland – southwest
- Wicomico County, Maryland – southwest
- Caroline County, Maryland – northwest

=== Major highways ===
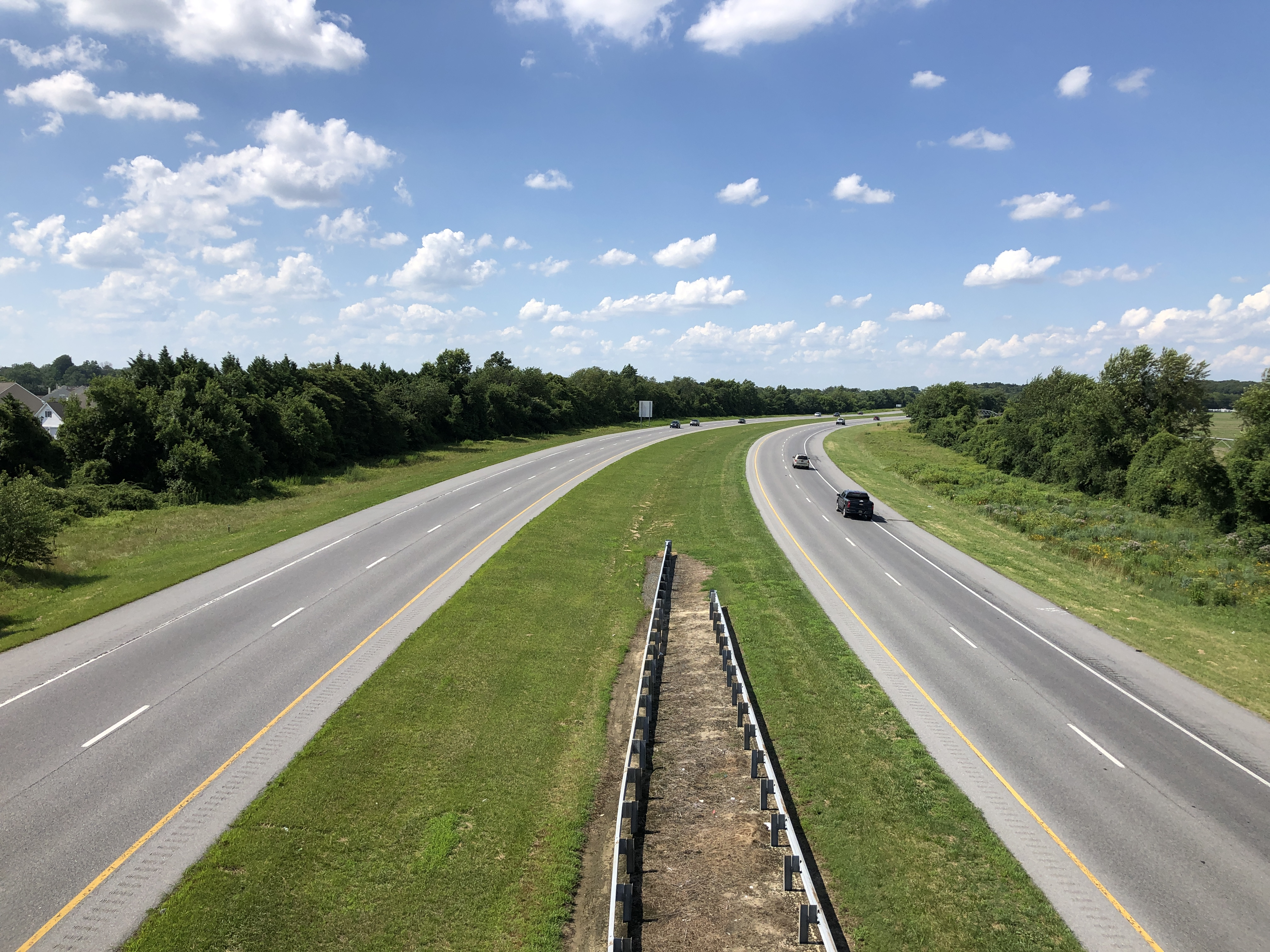
DE 1 in Milford, northern Sussex County

- US 9
- US 13
- US 113
- DE 1
- DE 5
- DE 16
- DE 17
- DE 18
- DE 20
- DE 23
- DE 24
- DE 26
- DE 30
- DE 36
- DE 54
- DE 404

=== National protected area ===
- Prime Hook National Wildlife Refuge

=== Climate ===
Sussex County has a humid subtropical climate (Cfa) according to the Köppen climate classification. The Trewartha climate classification only has the area along the Atlantic Coast up to Cape Henlopen and Lewes as Cf and the remainder of the county as Do (oceanic.) Three months average above 22 °C (71.6 °F), all months average above freezing, and seven to eight months average above 10 °C (50 °F). The hardiness zone is 7b except near the coast where it is 8a.

Climate data for Milford, Delaware
Month	Jan	Feb	Mar	Apr	May	Jun	Jul	Aug	Sep	Oct	Nov	Dec	Year
Record high °F (°C)	79 (26)	78 (26)	90 (32)	97 (36)	99 (37)	102 (39)	106 (41)	103 (39)	99 (37)	95 (35)	86 (30)	76 (24)	106 (41)
Mean daily maximum °F (°C)	43 (6)	45 (7)	54 (12)	64 (18)	73 (23)	82 (28)	87 (31)	85 (29)	78 (26)	68 (20)	58 (14)	48 (9)	65 (19)
Mean daily minimum °F (°C)	24 (−4)	25 (−4)	33 (1)	42 (6)	52 (11)	62 (17)	67 (19)	65 (18)	57 (14)	46 (8)	36 (2)	29 (−2)	45 (7)
Record low °F (°C)	−11 (−24)	−11 (−24)	4 (−16)	16 (−9)	28 (−2)	36 (2)	39 (4)	43 (6)	34 (1)	19 (−7)	9 (−13)	−2 (−19)	−11 (−24)
Average precipitation inches (mm)	4.08 (104)	3.30 (84)	4.51 (115)	3.50 (89)	4.03 (102)	3.31 (84)	3.69 (94)	4.61 (117)	4.08 (104)	3.48 (88)	3.32 (84)	3.59 (91)	45.50 (1,156)
Average snowfall inches (cm)	3.9 (9.9)	5.4 (14)	0.9 (2.3)	0.1 (0.25)	0 (0)	0 (0)	0 (0)	0 (0)	0 (0)	0 (0)	0.2 (0.51)	1.5 (3.8)	12 (30.76)

Climate data for Bethany Beach, Delaware
Month	Jan	Feb	Mar	Apr	May	Jun	Jul	Aug	Sep	Oct	Nov	Dec	Year
Record high °F (°C)	78 (26)	86 (30)	89 (32)	92 (33)	97 (36)	102 (39)	101 (38)	101 (38)	98 (37)	92 (33)	88 (31)	77 (25)	102 (39)
Mean daily maximum °F (°C)	45 (7)	48 (9)	55 (13)	65 (18)	74 (23)	83 (28)	87 (31)	85 (29)	79 (26)	69 (21)	59 (15)	49 (9)	67 (19)
Mean daily minimum °F (°C)	30 (−1)	31 (−1)	37 (3)	46 (8)	55 (13)	65 (18)	70 (21)	69 (21)	63 (17)	52 (11)	43 (6)	34 (1)	50 (10)
Record low °F (°C)	−11 (−24)	0 (−18)	9 (−13)	18 (−8)	32 (0)	40 (4)	47 (8)	47 (8)	37 (3)	26 (−3)	16 (−9)	0 (−18)	−11 (−24)
Average precipitation inches (mm)	3.62 (92)	3.23 (82)	4.40 (112)	3.59 (91)	3.72 (94)	3.39 (86)	4.78 (121)	4.73 (120)	4.04 (103)	3.94 (100)	3.66 (93)	3.85 (98)	46.95 (1,192)
Average snowfall inches (cm)	5.5 (14)	6.2 (16)	2.1 (5.3)	0.2 (0.51)	0 (0)	0 (0)	0 (0)	0 (0)	0 (0)	0 (0)	0.6 (1.5)	2.2 (5.6)	16.8 (42.91)
Source 1: The Weather Channel
Source 2: MyForecast

== Government ==
Unlike Northern Delaware, particularly New Castle County, Sussex County is highly conservative. Sussex County has only supported a Democrat for president three times since 1944. This was the only county in Delaware that Barack Obama did not carry in either of his presidential bids, despite the presence of Delawarean Joe Biden on the ballot. Biden himself lost the county by 11 points in his own successful bid for president in 2020. Nonetheless, while Sussex County rejected the Obama-Biden presidential ticket in 2008, Biden carried it in his simultaneous 2008 Senate run (as he did in six of his seven successful Senate campaigns), meaning some voters in the county rejected Biden as a vice presidential candidate while simultaneously supporting him for Senate.

United States presidential election results for Sussex County, Delaware
Year	Republican		Democratic		Third party(ies)	
Year	No.	%	No.	%	No.	%
1832	1,774	56.19%	1,383	43.81%	0	0.00%
1836	1,857	58.82%	1,300	41.18%	0	0.00%
1840	2,053	56.31%	1,593	43.69%	0	0.00%
1844	1,869	49.89%	1,877	50.11%	0	0.00%
1848	1,852	49.95%	1,856	50.05%	0	0.00%
1852	1,934	51.00%	1,858	49.00%	0	0.00%
1856	1	0.02%	2,344	53.70%	2,020	46.28%
1860	664	14.14%	204	4.34%	3,829	81.52%
1864	2,229	46.62%	2,552	53.38%	0	0.00%
1868	1,883	37.52%	3,136	62.48%	0	0.00%
1872	2,849	48.32%	2,778	47.12%	269	4.56%
1876	2,763	44.19%	3,490	55.81%	0	0.00%
1880	3,373	45.28%	3,993	53.60%	83	1.11%
1884	3,018	40.37%	4,447	59.49%	10	0.13%
1888	4,046	49.71%	3,982	48.92%	111	1.36%
1892	4,147	48.64%	4,279	50.19%	100	1.17%
1896	4,541	52.88%	3,826	44.55%	221	2.57%
1900	4,961	52.45%	4,364	46.14%	133	1.41%
1904	5,915	56.48%	4,407	42.08%	151	1.44%
1908	5,870	53.25%	5,013	45.48%	140	1.27%
1912	4,466	39.26%	5,551	48.80%	1,357	11.93%
1916	6,032	51.36%	5,649	48.10%	64	0.54%
1920	9,747	53.57%	8,448	46.43%	0	0.00%
1924	10,120	53.23%	8,668	45.59%	225	1.18%
1928	12,884	64.10%	7,163	35.64%	54	0.27%
1932	10,632	45.63%	12,618	54.15%	52	0.22%
1936	11,996	48.31%	12,799	51.54%	37	0.15%
1940	11,853	47.30%	13,206	52.70%	0	0.00%
1944	11,895	52.53%	10,678	47.15%	73	0.32%
1948	13,636	53.94%	11,522	45.57%	124	0.49%
1952	17,257	53.06%	15,054	46.29%	210	0.65%
1956	16,621	54.62%	13,697	45.01%	112	0.37%
1960	16,392	51.08%	15,472	48.21%	229	0.71%
1964	14,305	44.19%	17,971	55.51%	97	0.30%
1968	15,618	47.23%	11,671	35.30%	5,777	17.47%
1972	21,964	64.59%	11,630	34.20%	410	1.21%
1976	17,153	47.56%	18,552	51.44%	363	1.01%
1980	19,472	52.09%	15,973	42.73%	1,934	5.17%
1984	28,337	67.32%	13,629	32.38%	126	0.30%
1988	27,129	61.97%	16,504	37.70%	142	0.32%
1992	20,440	38.89%	19,174	36.48%	12,951	24.64%
1996	22,187	42.66%	23,191	44.59%	6,634	12.75%
2000	34,620	52.23%	29,739	44.86%	1,928	2.91%
2004	47,003	60.45%	30,098	38.71%	651	0.84%
2008	47,939	53.82%	40,299	45.24%	832	0.93%
2012	52,119	55.90%	39,975	42.88%	1,135	1.22%
2016	62,611	59.01%	39,333	37.07%	4,162	3.92%
2020	71,230	55.07%	56,682	43.82%	1,440	1.11%
2024	81,025	54.83%	64,836	43.88%	1,903	1.29%

Gubernatorial elections results

Gubernatorial elections results
Year	Republican	Democratic	Third parties
2024	55.73% 80,554	44.27% 63,994	0.0% 0
2020	53.81% 68,435	44.72% 56,873	1.47% 1,873
2016	52.79% 54,236	45.24% 46,476	1.97% 2,031
2012	40.61% 36,437	57.33% 51,439	2.05% 1,848

United States Senate election results for Sussex County, Delaware1
Year	Republican		Democratic		Third party(ies)	
Year	No.	%	No.	%	No.	%
2024	76,120	52.74%	62,934	43.60%	5,279	3.66%
2018	50,675	54.60%	40,675	43.82%	1,464	1.58%
2012	36,473	40.31%	47,421	52.41%	6,587	7.28%

United States Senate election results for Sussex County, Delaware2
Year	Republican		Democratic		Third party(ies)	
Year	No.	%	No.	%	No.	%
2020	67,402	53.28%	56,137	44.38%	2,959	2.34%
2014	34,067	55.44%	26,452	43.05%	931	1.52%
2010	40,345	56.92%	28,019	39.53%	2,520	3.56%

Sussex County's government is composed of an elected county council and various elective executive heads of departments. The county council has five members, who serve four-year terms; all are elected from single-member districts. They form the legislative authority of the county, and choose a "County Administrator" or executive.

The county council members are Council President Michael H. Vincent (R, District 1), Cynthia Green (R, District 2), Mark Schaeffer (R, District 3), Douglas B. Hudson (R, District 4), and Vice President John L. Rieley (R, District 5).

The additional offices of Clerk of the Peace, Register of Deeds, Register of Wills and Sheriff are elected at-large. These positions are held by Norman A. Jones Jr. (R), Alexandra Reed Baker (R), Gregory Fuller (R), and Robert Lee (R), respectively.

Sussex County is split between five state senate districts and nine state house districts.

State Senate:

- District 6 – Russ Huxtable (D)
- District 18 – David L. Wilson (R)
- District 19 – Brian G. Pettyjohn (R)
- District 20 – Gerald Hocker (R)
- District 21 – Bryant Richardson (R)

State House of Representatives:

- District 14 – Claire Snyder-Hall (D)
- District 20 – Alonna Berry (D)
- District 35 – Jesse Vanderwende (R)
- District 36 – Bryan Shupe (R)
- District 37 – Valerie Jones Giltner (R)
- District 38 – Ronald E. Gray (R)
- District 39 – Daniel Short (R)
- District 40 – Timothy Dukes (R)
- District 41 – Richard Collins (R)

== Demographics ==
Historical population
Census	Pop.	Note	%±
1790	20,488		—
1800	19,358		−5.5%
1810	27,750		43.4%
1820	24,057		−13.3%
1830	27,115		12.7%
1840	25,093		−7.5%
1850	25,936		3.4%
1860	29,615		14.2%
1870	31,696		7.0%
1880	36,018		13.6%
1890	38,647		7.3%
1900	42,276		9.4%
1910	46,413		9.8%
1920	43,741		−5.8%
1930	45,507		4.0%
1940	52,502		15.4%
1950	61,336		16.8%
1960	73,195		19.3%
1970	80,356		9.8%
1980	98,004		22.0%
1990	113,229		15.5%
2000	156,638		38.3%
2010	197,145		25.9%
2020	237,378		20.4%
2025 (est.)	277,140	▲	16.8%
U.S. Decennial Census; 1790-1960 1900-1990; 1990-2000 2010-2020

Sussex County, Delaware – Racial composition
Race (NH = Non-Hispanic)	2020	2010	2000	1990	1980
White alone (NH)	72.3% (171,741)	75.6% (149,025)	78.5% (122,888)	81% (91,709)	79.9% (78,337)
Black alone (NH)	10.5% (24,835)	12.4% (24,544)	14.7% (23,017)	16.6% (18,800)	18% (17,672)
American Indian alone (NH)	0.3% (764)	0.5% (924)	0.5% (755)	0.6% (641)	0.6% (635)
Asian alone (NH)	1.3% (3,014)	1% (1,910)	0.7% (1,150)	0.5% (568)	0.4% (414)
Pacific Islander alone (NH)	0% (70)	0% (62)	0% (54)		
Other race alone (NH)	0.4% (1,018)	0.2% (305)	0.1% (160)	0% (35)	0% (32)
Multiracial (NH)	3.9% (9,143)	1.7% (3,421)	1.1% (1,699)	—	—
Hispanic/Latino (any race)	11.3% (26,793)	8.6% (16,954)	4.4% (6,915)	1.3% (1,476)	0.9% (914)

=== 2020 census ===
As of the 2020 census, the county had a population of 237,378. Of the residents, 18.3% were under the age of 18 and 28.9% were 65 years of age or older; the median age was 50.8 years. For every 100 females there were 93.7 males, and for every 100 females age 18 and over there were 91.4 males. 62.4% of residents lived in urban areas and 37.6% lived in rural areas.

The racial makeup of the county was 74.1% White, 10.7% Black or African American, 0.8% American Indian and Alaska Native, 1.3% Asian, 6.0% from some other race, and 7.2% from two or more races. Hispanic or Latino residents of any race comprised 11.3% of the population.

There were 98,514 households in the county, of which 23.1% had children under the age of 18 living with them and 26.5% had a female householder with no spouse or partner present. About 26.4% of all households were made up of individuals and 14.7% had someone living alone who was 65 years of age or older.

There were 142,280 housing units, of which 30.8% were vacant. Among occupied housing units, 79.9% were owner-occupied and 20.1% were renter-occupied. The homeowner vacancy rate was 1.8% and the rental vacancy rate was 12.8%.

The most reported ancestries in 2020 were:

- English (18.4%)
- Irish (16.6%)
- German (14.5%)
- Italian (7.5%)
- African American (6.2%)
- Mexican (3.7%)
- Guatemalan (3.7%)
- Polish (3.3%)
- Scottish (2.6%)
- French (1.7%)

=== 2010 census ===
As of the 2010 census, there were 197,145 people, 79,368 households, and 53,698 families residing in the county. The population density was 210.6 inhabitants per square mile (81.3/km^{2}). There were 123,036 housing units at an average density of 131.4 per square mile (50.7/km^{2}). The racial makeup of the county was 79.0% white, 12.7% black or African American, 1.0% Asian, 0.8% American Indian, 0.1% Pacific islander, 4.1% from other races, and 2.3% from two or more races. Those of Hispanic or Latino origin made up 8.6% of the population. In terms of ancestry, 17.9% were Irish, 17.8% were German, 15.9% were English, 7.0% were Italian, and 6.2% were American.

Of the 79,368 households, 27.0% had children under the age of 18 living with them, 51.3% were married couples living together, 11.7% had a female householder with no husband present, 32.3% were non-families, and 25.6% of all households were made up of individuals. The average household size was 2.45 and the average family size was 2.89. The median age was 45.4 years.

The median income for a household in the county was $51,046 and the median income for a family was $59,053. Males had a median income of $41,978 versus $32,148 for females. The per capita income for the county was $26,779. About 8.0% of families and 11.7% of the population were below the poverty line, including 20.4% of those under age 18 and 6.5% of those age 65 or over.

=== 2000 census ===
As of the census of 2000, there were 156,638 people, 62,577 households, and 43,866 families residing in the county. The population density was 167 inhabitants per square mile (64/km^{2}). There were 93,070 housing units at an average density of 99 per square mile (38/km^{2}). The racial makeup of the county was 80.35% White, 14.89% Black or African American, 0.60% Native American, 0.75% Asian, 0.04% Pacific Islander, 2.02% from other races, and 1.35% from two or more races. 4.41% of the population were Hispanic or Latino of any race. 14.9% were of English, 14.3% United States or American (Mostly British), 12.9% Irish, 12.5% German and 5.6% Italian ancestry, 93.3% spoke English and 4.3% Spanish as their first language.

There were 62,577 households, out of which 27.10% had children under the age of 18 living with them, 54.90% were married couples living together, 11.30% had a female householder with no husband present, and 29.90% were non-families. 24.30% of all households were made up of individuals, and 11.10% had someone living alone who was 65 years of age or older. The average household size was 2.45 and the average family size was 2.88.

In the county, the population was spread out, with 22.50% under the age of 18, 7.00% from 18 to 24, 26.30% from 25 to 44, 25.60% from 45 to 64, and 18.50% who were 65 years of age or older. The median age was 41 years. For every 100 females, there were 95.50 males. For every 100 females age 18 and over, there were 92.80 males.

The median income for a household in the county was $39,208, and the median income for a family was $45,203. Males had a median income of $30,811 versus $23,625 for females. The per capita income for the county was $20,328. About 7.70% of families and 10.50% of the population were below the poverty line, including 15.00% of those under age 18 and 8.40% of those age 65 or over.

Eastern parts of Sussex County, particularly the Cape Region, tend to be more affluent than western portions of the county, with a median household income of $77,030 in 2009.

== Economy ==
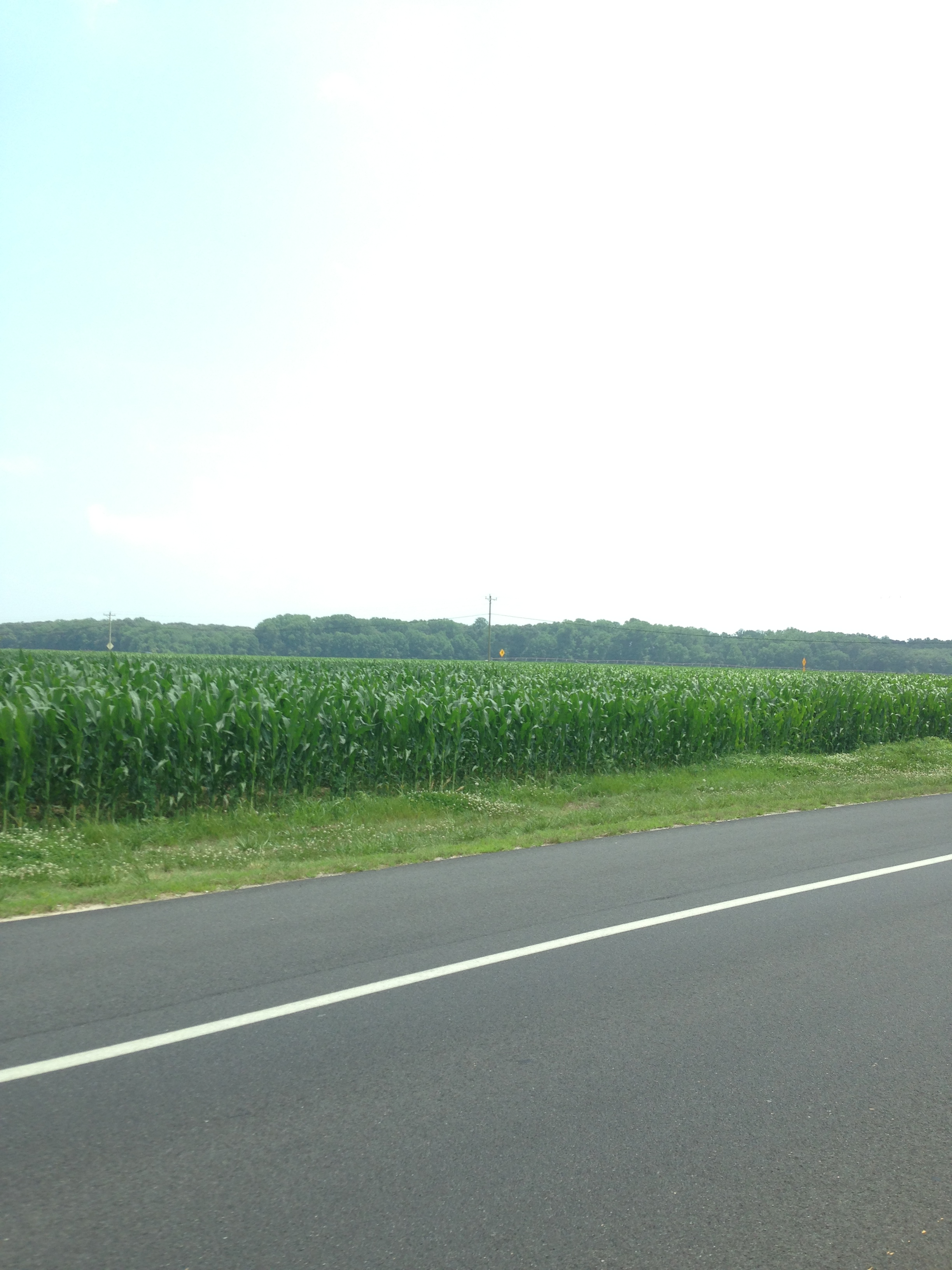
Cornfields seen near Lewes

Most of Sussex County's economy revolves around agriculture. In fact, Sussex County produces the most poultry of any county in the United States.

Tourism also plays a large part of the economy, particularly in eastern Sussex County. According to SeaGrant Delaware, the Delaware Beaches generate $6.9 billion annually and over $711 million in tax revenue.

The average home and property price in Sussex County increased 250% in the ten years between 1995 and 2005. Local increases within Sussex County for this period include a 381% increase for Millsboro and a 609% increase for Millville. Sussex County is served by the Delmarva Central Railroad and the Maryland and Delaware Railroad.

== Education ==
=== Public ===
Sussex County is served by eight public school districts.

- Cape Henlopen School District
- Delmar School District
- Indian River School District
- Laurel School District
- Milford School District (also serves Kent County)
- Seaford School District
- Woodbridge School District (also serves Kent County)
- Sussex Technical School District (County-wide overlay school district)

The county also contains one charter school, the Sussex Academy of Arts & Sciences.

Those state funded public high schools which participate in sporting events are members of the Henlopen Conference.

In the period of de jure educational segregation in the United States, K-12 students of black African descent attended segregated schools. William C. Jason Comprehensive High School District 192 in Georgetown housed high school students of black African descent during the period 1951 to 1967. Desegregation occurred after 1967.

In the past, a school called Warwick School 225 educated members of the Nanticoke Indian Association.

In 2023, Sean Greene of WDEL (AM) stated: "there is relatively light competition for traditional public students in Kent and Sussex County [sic] outside of school choice."

=== Private ===
In 2010, 14.8% of the county students enrolled in K–12 schools were in private institutions.

There are several private schools in Sussex County: Bible Center Christian Academy (Laurel), Children Craft CO (Seaford), Delmarva Christian High School (Georgetown, Destiny Christian School (Georgetown), Eagle's Nest Christian School (Milton), Epworth Christian School (Laurel), Greenwood Mennonite School (Greenwood), Harbor Christian Academy (Ellendale), The Jefferson School (Georgetown), Jesus Is Lord Christian Academy (Georgetown), Lighthouse Christian School (Dagsboro), Lighted Pathway Christian Academy (Seaford), Milford Christian School (Milford) and Seaford Christian Academy (Seaford).

=== Higher education ===
There are several colleges and universities in Sussex County. Delaware Technical Community College has the largest presence in the county, but students can also attend Delaware State University, Goldey-Beacom College, University of Delaware all in Georgetown, the Philadelphia Bible College in Ellendale, and the Beebe Hospital School of Nursing in Lewes. The University of Delaware also maintains a marine science campus in Lewes.

== Culture ==
The culture in Sussex County is much like that found in other Delmarva counties. Sussex County is starkly different from the rest of the Mid-Atlantic and is much like that of the Southern United States. Sussex County is driven by agriculture and commercial fishing. Most of the land is rural and there are but a few large population centers. Many local restaurants serve southern cuisine such as sweet tea and dishes including or composed entirely of greens in addition to menus heavy with fried food.

Many dialectic studies show that Sussex County residents, much like surrounding Delmarva counties, have a variation of Southern American English which is particularly prevalent in rural areas.

=== Festivals, fairs, and events ===
Sussex County, Delaware is home to several festivals, fairs, and events. Some of the more notable festivals are the Bethany Beach Jazz Funeral to mark the end of summer, Apple Scrapple Festival in Bridgeville, the Return Day Parade held after elections in even-numbered years in Georgetown, the Laurel Independence Day Celebration, the Nanticoke Indian Association's Nanticoke Indian Pow Wow in Oak Orchard, the Rehoboth Beach Chocolate Festival, the Rehoboth Beach Independent Film Festival, the Rehoboth Beach Jazz Festival, the Sea Witch Halloween Festival and Parade in Rehoboth Beach, the Dagsboro Christmas Parade and Seaford Riverfest. Also, Sussex County is the home of the Senior League Softball World Series in Roxana at the Lower Sussex Little League Field. The World Championship Punkin Chunkin was held in Sussex County.

== Media ==
=== Newspapers ===
- Cape Gazette
- Coastal Point, Ocean View
- Delaware Coast Press, Rehoboth Beach
- Delaware Wave, Bethany Beach
- Hoy en Delaware, Georgetown
- Laurel Star, Laurel
- Leader & State Register, Seaford
- Seaford Star, Seaford
- Sussex Countian
- Sussex Post, Georgetown
- The Script, Georgetown (published at various times throughout the school year, stories by DelTech students majoring in communications)

=== Radio ===
Call sign	Frequency	City of license	Owner	Format
WUSX	98.5 FM	Seaford	Adams Radio Group	Country
WGMD	92.7 FM	Rehoboth Beach	Resort Broadcasting Co., LLC	News Talk Information
WJKI-FM	103.5 FM	Bethany Beach	The Voice Radio, LLC	Classic Rock
WJWL	900 AM	Georgetown	Great Scott Broadcasting	Spanish Variety
WKDB	95.3 FM	Laurel	Great Scott Broadcasting	Contemporary Hit Radio
WOCM	98.1 FM	Selbyville	Irie Radio, Inc.	Album Adult Alternative
WRBG-LP	106.5 FM	Millsboro	Rhythm and Blues Group Harmonty Association, Inc.	
WSUX	1280 AM	Seaford	Great Scott Broadcasting	Spanish Variety
WZBH	93.5 FM	Georgetown	Adams Radio Group	Active Rock
WZEB	101.7 FM	Ocean View	Great Scott Broadcasting	Contemporary Hit Radio
WXDE	105.9 FM	Lewes	Delmarva Broadcasting Company	News Talk

=== Television ===
- Sussex County is officially classified as being part of the Salisbury television market. However, due to the association with the Philadelphia and Baltimore metropolitan areas, their channels are usually available on cable and sometimes provide news coverage.
- WBOC, Salisbury, CBS & Fox
- WDPB, Seaford, PBS
- WMDT, Salisbury, ABC & The CW
- WRDE-LD, Salisbury, NBC and MyTV
- WBAL, Baltimore, NBC
- WJZ, Baltimore, CBS
- WCAU, Philadelphia, NBC
- WTXF, Philadelphia, Fox

== Communities ==
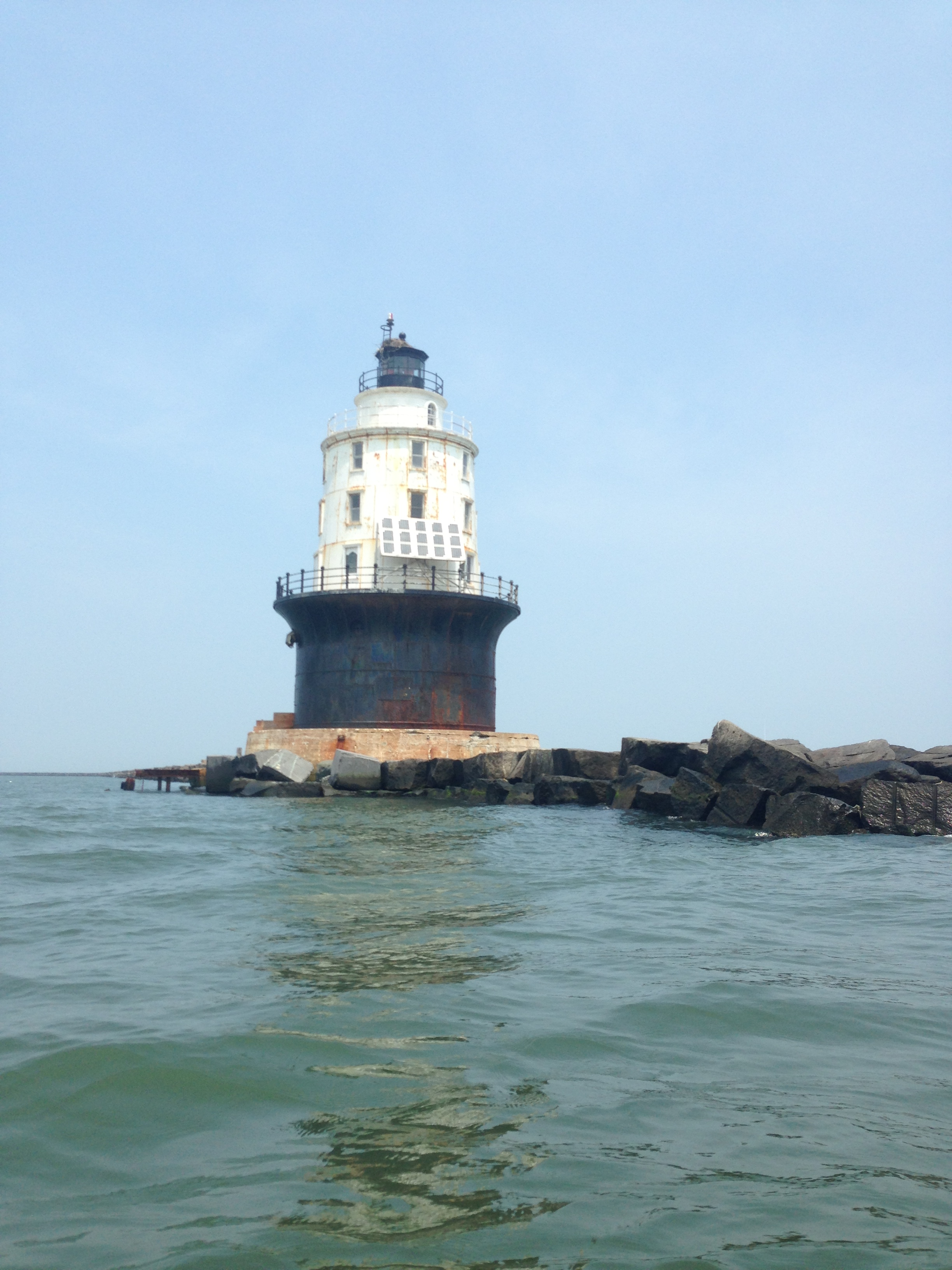
Lighthouse off the coast of Lewes

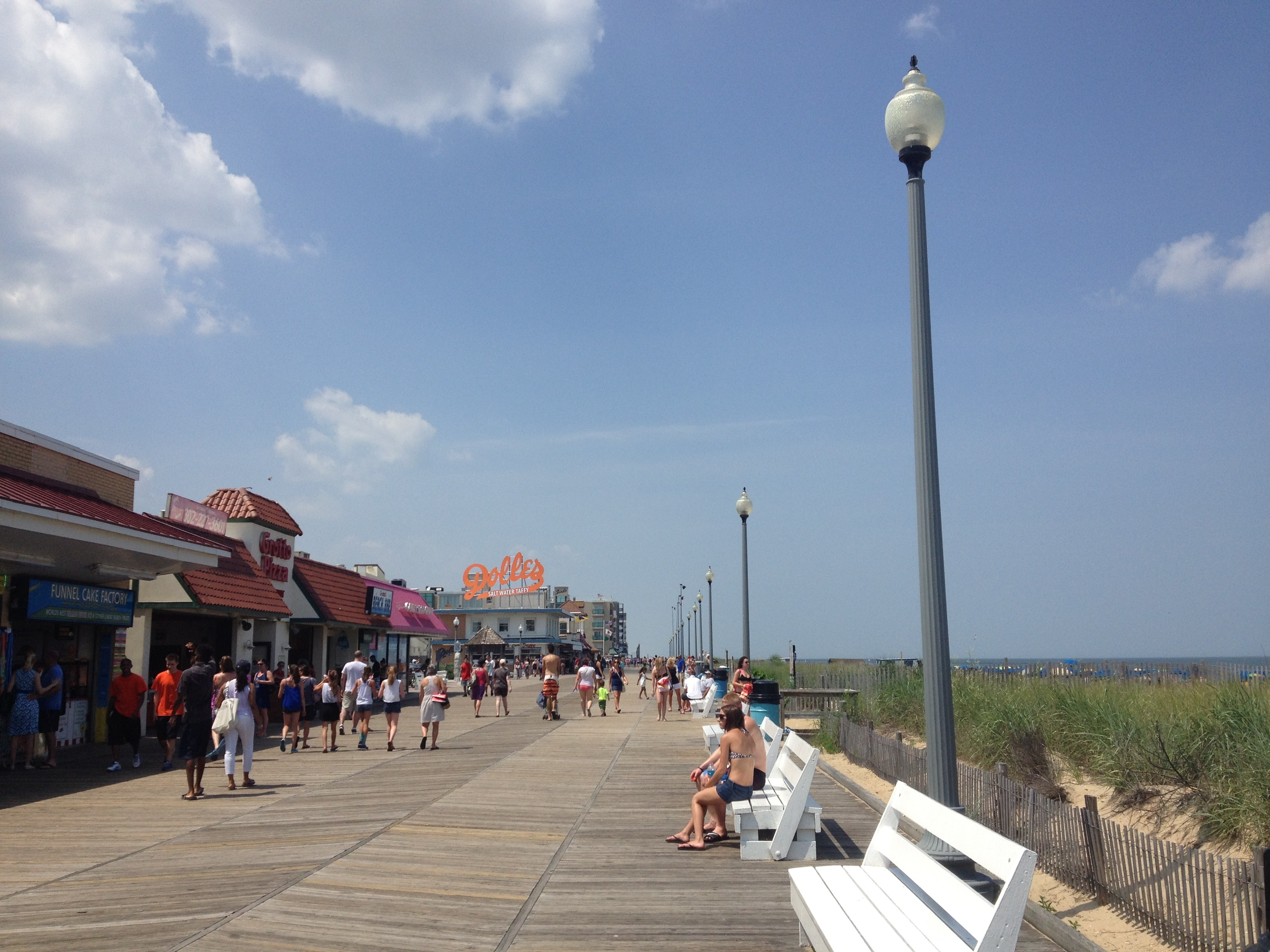
Rehoboth Beach

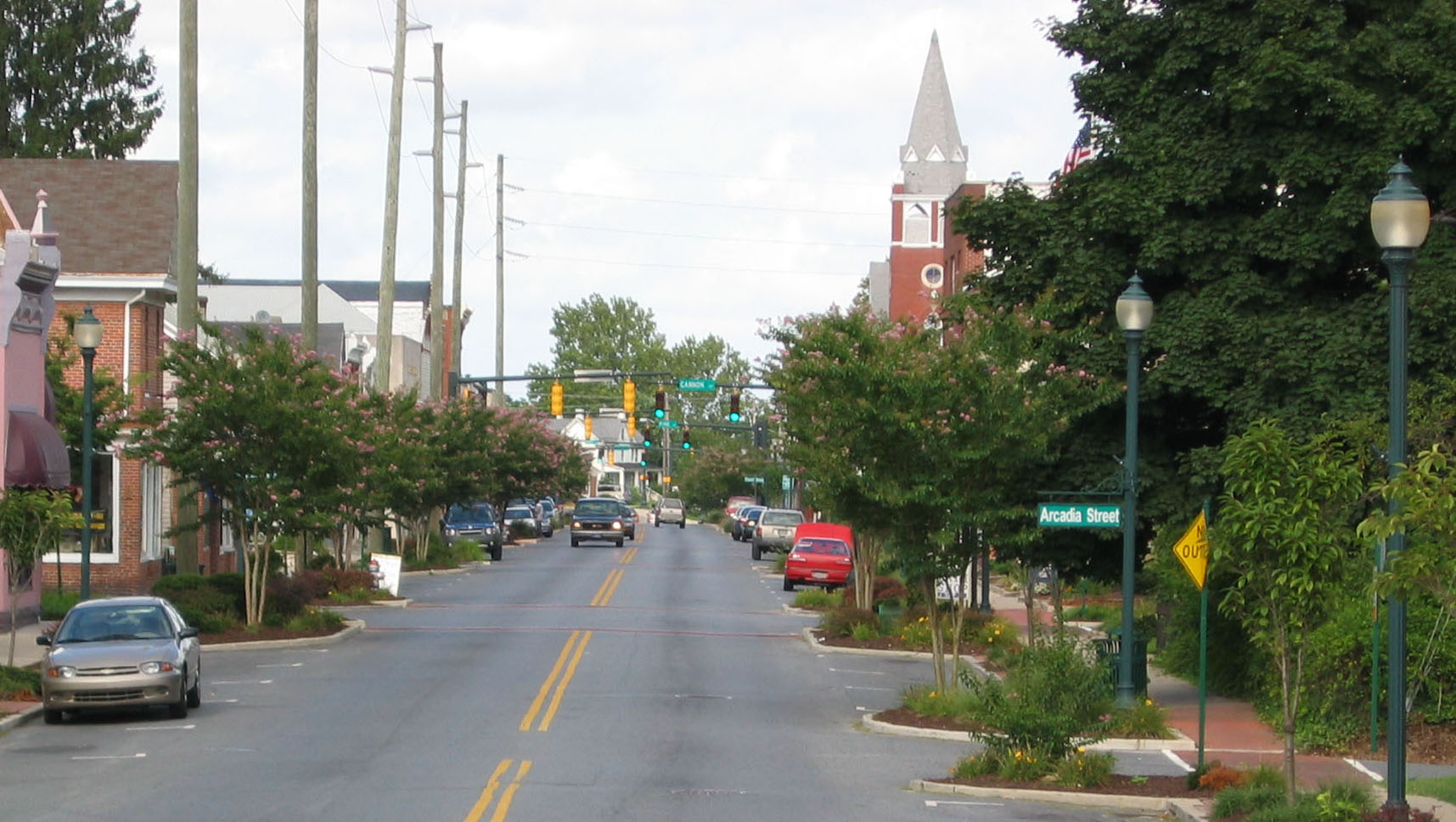
Seaford

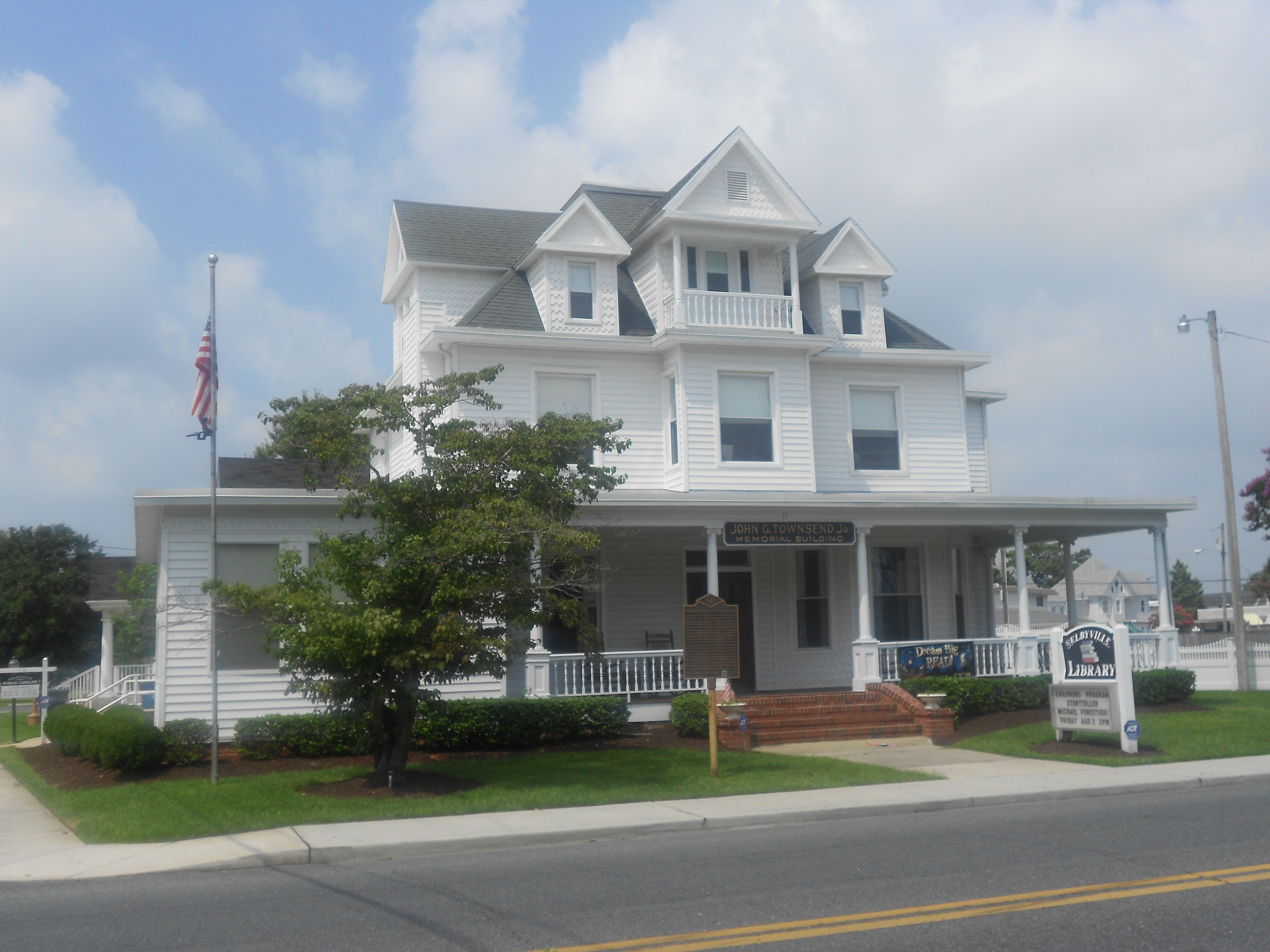
Selbyville Public Library

=== Cities ===
- Lewes
- Milford (partly in Kent County)
- Rehoboth Beach
- Seaford

=== Towns ===
- Bethany Beach
- Bethel
- Blades
- Bridgeville
- Dagsboro
- Delmar
- Dewey Beach
- Ellendale
- Fenwick Island
- Frankford
- Georgetown
- Greenwood
- Henlopen Acres
- Laurel
- Millsboro
- Millville
- Milton
- Ocean View
- Selbyville
- Slaughter Beach
- South Bethany

=== Unincorporated communities ===
- Gumboro
- Harbeson
- Lincoln (a census-designated place)
- Long Neck (a census-designated place)
- Oak Orchard
- Reliance (partial)
- Roxana
- Stockley
- Zoar

=== Ghost towns ===
- Banning
- New Market
- Owens station
- Saint Johnstown

== See also ==
- National Register of Historic Places listings in Sussex County, Delaware
- Slaughter Creek (Cedar Creek tributary)
