= List of hundreds of Delaware =

Administrative subdivisions in Delaware

Hundreds in Delaware are unincorporated subdivisions of counties, equivalent to townships in some other states. They were once used as a basis for representation in the Delaware General Assembly.

While their names still appear on all real estate transactions, they currently have no function except for non-renewable rental agreements of 120 days or less for dwellings located in Broadkill Hundred, Lewes-Rehoboth Hundred, Indian River Hundred and Baltimore Hundred, which are not subject to the Delaware Landlord-Tenant Code. The divisions come from the times when Delaware and Maryland were colonial holdings of England. While Delaware retains the use of "hundreds," the origin of most place names in both states trace back to the times of British rule.

== New Castle County ==
Hundred Name	Created	Parent Hundred	Primary Town	Origin of Name
Appoquinimink Hundred	1682	original	Townsend	Appoquinimink Creek
Blackbird Hundred	1875	Appoquinimink Hundred		Blackbird Creek
Brandywine Hundred	1682	original	Bellefonte	Brandywine Creek
Christiana Hundred	1682	original	Elsmere	Christiana River
Mill Creek Hundred	1710	Christiana Hundred		Mill Creek
New Castle Hundred	1682	original	New Castle	Town of New Castle
Pencader Hundred	1710	New Castle Hundred		Pencader (Welsh Tract) Church
Red Lion Hundred	1710	New Castle Hundred	Delaware City	Red Lion Creek
St. George's Hundred	1682	original	Middletown	St. George's Creek
White Clay Hundred	1710	Christiana Hundred	Newark	White Clay Creek
Wilmington Hundred	1833	Christiana Hundred	Wilmington	City of Wilmington

== Kent County ==
Hundred Name	Created	Parent Hundred	Primary Town	Origin of Name
Duck Creek Hundred	1682	original	Smyrna	Duck Creek
East Dover Hundred	1859	Dover Hundred	Dover	City of Dover
Kenton Hundred	1869	Duck Creek Hundred	Kenton	Town of Kenton
Little Creek Hundred	1682	original	Leipsic	Little Creek
Milford Hundred	1830	Mispillion Hundred	Milford	City of Milford
Mispillion Hundred	1682	original	Harrington	Mispillion River
North Murderkill Hundred	1855	Murderkill Hundred	Camden	Murderkill River
South Murderkill Hundred	1855	Murderkill Hundred	Felton	Murderkill River
West Dover Hundred	1859	Dover Hundred	Hartly	City of Dover

- St. Jones Hundred was created in 1682, and was renamed Dover Hundred in 1823; Dover Hundred was subsequently divided into East Dover Hundred and West Dover Hundred in 1859.
- Murderkill Hundred was created in 1682 and was divided into North Murderkill Hundred and South Murderkill Hundred in 1855.

== Sussex County ==
Hundred Name	Created	Parent Hundred	Primary Town	Origin of Name
Baltimore Hundred	1775	Worcester County, Maryland	Millville	Part of never-erected Maryland county
Broad Creek Hundred	1775	Somerset County, Maryland	Bethel	Broad Creek
Broadkill Hundred	1696	original	Milton	Broadkill River
Cedar Creek Hundred	1702	Broadkill Hundred	Milford	Cedar Creek
Dagsboro Hundred	1773	Worcester County, Maryland	Millsboro	Dagsboro
Georgetown Hundred	1863	Broadkill Hundred	Georgetown	Georgetown
Gumboro Hundred	1873	Dagsboro Hundred		Gumboro
Indian River Hundred	1706	Lewes & Rehoboth Hundred		Indian River (inlet and bay)
Lewes & Rehoboth Hundred	1692	original	Lewes	Lewes (Whorekill) and the Rehoboth Bay
Little Creek Hundred	1774	Somerset County, Maryland	Laurel	Little Creek
Nanticoke Hundred	1775	Somerset County, Maryland		Nanticoke River
Northwest Fork Hundred	1775	Dorchester County, Maryland	Bridgeville	Northwest Fork, Nanticoke River
Seaford Hundred	1869	Northwest Fork Hundred	Seaford	Seaford

== See also ==
- List of counties in Delaware

== Sources ==
- The University of Delaware Library (2001). The Hundreds of Delaware. Retrieved August 17, 2005.
- The Delaware Genealogical research Guide (1997). Delaware Counties and Hundreds. Retrieved August 17, 2005.
- The Historical Society of Delaware. Delaware Counties. Retrieved August 17, 2005.
- The Historical Society of Delaware. Delaware's Hundreds. Retrieved August 17, 2005.
- Delaware State Archives/Historical Markers
- 25 Del. C. § 5102.
