= Libertarian Party of Delaware =

State affiliate of the Libertarian Party

- Abbreviation: LPDE
- Chairperson: Bill Hinds
- Founded: 1975
- Membership (2022): ▲2,220
- Ideology: Libertarianism
- National affiliation: Libertarian Party
- Colors: Gold-yellow
- Statewide executive offices: 0 / 6
- Seats in the Delaware Senate: 0 / 21
- Seats in the Delaware House: 0 / 41
- DE seats in the U.S. Senate: 0 / 2
- DE seats in the U.S. House: 0 / 1
- Other elected officials: 0 (June 2024)

Website
- lp-delaware.org

The Libertarian Party of Delaware (LPDE) is the Delaware affiliate of the national Libertarian Party. It was founded in 1975.

They have maintained continuous ballot access since 1980. This kind of ballot access has long been considered a core goal for Libertarian Party state-level affiliates.

== Leadership ==
Current Officers
Chair	Vice Chair	Secretary	Treasurer
Bill Hinds	Amy LePore	Jesse McVay	Carter Hill

== LPDE Platform ==
Libertarian philosophy centers on individual rights and the non-aggression principle (NAP). The LPDE statement of principles prioritizes the right to life, the right to liberty of speech and action (opposing government censorship in any form), and the right to property.

== Electoral performance ==
=== Presidential ===
Election year	Vote percentage	±%	Votes	Presidential candidate	Vice presidential candidate	Result	Reference
1980	0.8%	N/A	1,974	Ed Clark	David Koch	4th	
1984	0.1%	▼0.7	268	David Bergland	James A. Lewis	4th	
1988	0.5%	▲0.4	1,162	Ron Paul	Andre Marrou	3rd	
1992	0.3%	▼0.2	935	Andre Marrou	Nancy Lord	5th	
1996	0.8%	▲0.4	2,052	Harry Browne	Jo Jorgensen	4th	
2000	0.2%	▼0.5	774	Harry Browne	Art Olivier	5th	
2004	0.2%	▼0.1	586	Michael Badnarik	Richard Campagna	4th	
2008	0.3%	▲0.1	1,109	Bob Barr	Wayne Allyn Root	4th	
2012	0.9%	▲0.7	3,882	Gary Johnson	Jim Gray	3rd	
2016	3.3%	▲2.4	14,757	Gary Johnson	Bill Weld	3rd	
2020	1.0%	▼2.3	5,000	Jo Jorgensen	Spike Cohen	3rd	

=== U.S. Senate ===
Election year	Senate candidate	Votes	Vote percentage	Reference
1982	Lawrence D. Sullivan	653	0.34%	
1990	Lee Rosenbaum	2680	1.49%	
1994	John Dierickx	3387	1.70%	
1996	Mark A. Jones	3340	1.21%	
2000	J. Burke Morrison	1103	0.30%	
2002	Raymond T. Buranello	922	0.40%	
2006	William E. Morris	2671	1.10%	
2010	James W. Rash	2101	0.70%	
2018	Nadine M. Frost	3910	1.09%	
2020	Nadine M. Frost	5244	1.07%	

=== U.S. House of Representatives ===
Election year	House candidate	Votes	Vote percentage	Reference
1980	Sullivan	1506	0.70%	
1982	Richard A. Cohen	711	0.38%	
1984	V. Luther Etzel	294	0.12%	
1990	Richard A. Cohen	3121	1.76%	
1992	Peggy Schmitt	5661	2.05%	
1994	Danny Ray Beaver	3869	1.98%	
1996	George A. Jurgensen	4000	1.50%	
2000	Brad C. Thomas	2351	0.80%	
2002	Brad C. Thomas	2789	1.20%	
2004	William E. Morris	2012	0.50%	
2008	Mark Anthony Parks	3586	0.90%	
2010	Brent A. Wangen	1986	0.60%	
2012	Scott Gesty	4096	1.10%	
2014	Scott Gesty	4419	1.80%	
2016	Scott Gesty	6436	1.55%	
2020	David L. Rogers	3814	0.78%	
2022	Cody R. McNutt	3074	0.96%	

=== Delaware Governor ===
Election year	Gubernatorial candidate	Votes	Vote percentage	Reference
1980	Levy	1815	0.81%	
1992	Richard A. Cohen	3165	1.14%	
2004	Frank Infante	1450	0.40%	
2012	Jesse McVay	3668	1.00%	
2016	Sean L. Goward	4577	1.09%	
2020	John J. Machurek	3270	0.66%	

== See also ==
- List of state parties of the Libertarian Party (United States)
