= 2020 United States presidential election in Delaware =

- November 3, 2020
- Turnout: 68.86% ▲3.51 pp

Nominee	Joe Biden	Donald Trump
Party	Democratic	Republican
Home state	Delaware	Florida
Running mate	Kamala Harris	Mike Pence
Electoral vote	3	0
Popular vote	296,268	200,603
Percentage	58.74%	39.77%

Biden
40–50%
50–60%
60–70%
70–80%
80–90%
90–100%
Trump
40–50%
50–60%
60–70%
70–80%
80–90%
No Data
President before election
Donald Trump
Republican
Elected President
Joe Biden
Democratic

The 2020 United States presidential election in Delaware was held on Tuesday, November 3, 2020, as part of the 2020 United States presidential election in which all 50 states plus the District of Columbia participated. Delaware voters chose electors to represent them in the Electoral College via a popular vote, pitting the Republican Party's nominee, incumbent President Donald Trump from Florida, and running mate Vice President Mike Pence from Indiana against Democratic Party nominee, former Vice President Joe Biden, of Delaware, and his running mate California Senator Kamala Harris. Delaware has three electoral votes in the Electoral College.

Biden, who represented the state in the U.S. Senate from 1973 to 2009, defeated Trump in the state by 19 points, a significant improvement over Hillary Clinton's 11% margin over Trump in 2016, and even a slight improvement over Barack Obama's margin in 2012, when Biden was his running mate. Biden flipped the swing county of Kent, while Sussex County, which last voted Democratic on the presidential level when Bill Clinton carried it in 1996, stayed Republican, although Biden previously carried the county in six of his seven runs to the Senate. Delaware's remaining county, New Castle—home to Biden's hometown of Wilmington and part of both the Northeast megalopolis and the Philadelphia metropolitan area, containing 55% of the state's population—stayed Democratic, having last voted Republican when George H. W. Bush carried it in 1988, also the last time the state voted for the Republican nominee. Biden's margin in New Castle County would have been more than enough to carry the state; he carried his home county by over 106,000 votes, exceeding his statewide margin of 95,665 votes.

Per exit polls by the Associated Press, Biden's strength in his home state came from African Americans with 91%; and Caucasians with 50%, including those with a college degree with 54%. 59% of Delawarean voters had a favorable opinion of him. Biden won overwhelmingly in his hometown of Wilmington, earning 26,698 votes to Trump's 3,580.

With Biden's victory nationwide, he became the first person representing Delaware ever elected president.

== Primary elections ==
The primary elections were originally scheduled for April 28, 2020. On March 24, they were moved to June 2 due to concerns over the COVID-19 pandemic. On May 7, the primary elections were again postponed to July 7. By that time, President Donald Trump of the Republican Party and former Vice President Joe Biden of the Democratic Party had already clinched enough delegates to become the presumptive nominees of their respective parties. This was Biden's third presidential attempt, as he had previously campaigned in the 1988 and 2008 Democratic presidential primaries but failed to secure the nomination both times.

=== Republican primary ===
Incumbent President Donald Trump was essentially uncontested in the Republican primary. The state has 16 delegates to the 2020 Republican National Convention.

However, Trump was not unopposed: Rocky De La Fuente took 12% of the vote, with Trump polling 88%.

2020 Delaware Republican presidential primary
Candidate	Votes	%	Delegates
Donald Trump (incumbent)	28,876	88.05%	16
Rocky De La Fuente	3,920	11.95%	
Total	32,796	100%	16

=== Democratic primary ===
2020 Delaware Democratic presidential primary
Candidate	Votes	%	Delegates
Joe Biden	81,954	89.39	21
Bernie Sanders (withdrawn)	6,878	7.50	
Elizabeth Warren (withdrawn)	2,850	3.11	
Total	91,682	100%	21

== General election ==
=== Predictions ===
Source	Ranking	As of
The Cook Political Report	Safe D	September 10, 2020
Inside Elections	Safe D	September 4, 2020
Sabato's Crystal Ball	Safe D	July 14, 2020
Politico	Safe D	September 8, 2020
RCP	Safe D	August 3, 2020
Niskanen	Safe D	July 26, 2020
CNN	Safe D	August 3, 2020
The Economist	Safe D	September 2, 2020
CBS News	Likely D	August 16, 2020
270towin	Safe D	August 2, 2020
ABC News	Safe D	July 31, 2020
NPR	Likely D	August 3, 2020
NBC News	Safe D	August 6, 2020
538	Safe D	September 9, 2020

=== Polling ===
Graph of opinion polls conducted. Trend lines represent local regressions.

Aggregate polls

Source of poll aggregation	Dates administered	Dates updated	Joe Biden Democratic	Donald Trump Republican	Other/ Undecided (Note: Calculated by taking the difference of 100% and all other candidates combined.)	Margin
270 to Win	October 5 – November 1, 2020	November 3, 2020	57.5%	35.5%	7.0%	Biden +22.0
FiveThirtyEight	until November 2, 2020	November 3, 2020	58.9%	34.6%	6.5%	Biden +24.3
Average			58.2%	35.1%	6.8%	Biden +23.2

Poll source	Date(s) administered	Sample size (Note: Key: A – all adults RV – registered voters LV – likely voters V – unclear)	Margin of error	Donald Trump Republican	Joe Biden Democratic	Jo Jorgensen Libertarian	Howie Hawkins Green	Undecided
SurveyMonkey/Axios	Oct 20 – Nov 2, 2020	656 (LV)	± 6%	38% (Note: Overlapping sample with the previous SurveyMonkey/Axios poll, but more information available regarding sample size)	60%	-	-	–
SurveyMonkey/Axios	Oct 1–28, 2020	1,323 (LV)	–	37%	62%	-	-	–
SurveyMonkey/Axios	Sep 1–30, 2020	395 (LV)	–	37%	61%	-	-	2%
University of Delaware	Sep 21–27, 2020	847 (LV)	–	33%	54%	2%	1%	10% (Note: "None/other/undecided" with 10%)
SurveyMonkey/Axios	Aug 1–31, 2020	348 (LV)	–	32%	67%	-	-	1%
PPP	Aug 21–22, 2020	710 (V)	± 3.7%	37%	58%	-	-	5%
SurveyMonkey/Axios	Jul 1–31, 2020	453 (LV)	–	31%	67%	-	-	2%
SurveyMonkey/Axios	Jun 8–30, 2020	232 (LV)	–	34%	64%	-	-	2%
Gonzales Research	Jan 16–21, 2020	410 (LV)	± 5.0%	40%	56%	-	-	4%

Former candidates

Donald Trump vs. Michael Bloomberg

Poll source	Date(s) administered	Sample size	Margin of error	Donald Trump (R)	Michael Bloomberg (D)	Undecided
Gonzales Research	Jan 16–21, 2020	410 (LV)	± 5.0%	47%	48%	5%

Donald Trump vs. Pete Buttigieg

Poll source	Date(s) administered	Sample size	Margin of error	Donald Trump (R)	Pete Buttigieg (D)	Undecided
Gonzales Research	Jan 16–21, 2020	410 (LV)	± 5.0%	45%	50%	5%

Donald Trump vs. Bernie Sanders

Poll source	Date(s) administered	Sample size	Margin of error	Donald Trump (R)	Bernie Sanders (D)	Undecided
Gonzales Research	Jan 16–21, 2020	410 (LV)	± 5.0%	46%	47%	7%

Donald Trump vs. Elizabeth Warren

Poll source	Date(s) administered	Sample size	Margin of error	Donald Trump (R)	Elizabeth Warren (D)	Undecided
Gonzales Research	Jan 16–21, 2020	410 (LV)	± 5.0%	46%	49%	5%

=== Results ===
State House district results: Biden 50–60% 60–70% 70–80% 80–90% 90–100% / Trump 50–60% 60–70%

2020 United States presidential election in Delaware
Party	Candidate	Votes	%	±%
Democratic	Joe Biden; Kamala Harris	296,268	58.74	+5.65
Republican	Donald Trump (incumbent); Mike Pence (incumbent)	200,603	39.77	–1.95
Libertarian	Jo Jorgensen; Spike Cohen	5,000	0.99	–2.34
Green	Howie Hawkins; Angela Nicole Walker	2,139	0.42	–0.95
Independent	Kanye West (write-in)	169	0.03	N/A
American Solidarity	Brian T. Carroll (write-in)	87	0.02	N/A
Independent	Jade Simmons (write-in); Claudeliah Roze (write-in)	28	0.01	N/A
Socialism and Liberation	Gloria La Riva (write-in)	14	0.00	N/A
Independent	Mark Charles (write-in)	8	0.00	N/A
Independent	Barbara Bellar (write-in)	7	0.00	N/A
Independent	Brock Pierce (write-in); Karla Ballard (write-in)	5	0.00	N/A
Independent	Shawn Howard (write-in)	4	0.00	N/A
American Party of America	Dennis Ball (write-in)	3	0.00	N/A
Independent	Todd Cella (write-in)	2	0.00	N/A
Independent	Princess Khadijah Maryam Jacob-Fambro (write-in)	2	0.00	N/A
Independent	Mitchell Williams (write-in)	2	0.00	N/A
Independent	Tom Hoefling (write-in); Andy Prior (write-in)	1	0.00	N/A
Independent	President Boddie (write-in)	1	0.00	N/A
Independent	Kathryn Gibson (write-in)	1	0.00	N/A
Independent	Kasey Wells (write-in)	1	0.00	N/A
Independent	Deborah Rouse (write-in)	1	0.00	N/A
Total votes		504,346	100%	+13.64
Democratic win				

==== By county ====
County	Joe Biden Democratic		Donald Trump Republican		Various candidates Other parties		Margin		Total votes cast
County	#	%	#	%	#	%	#	%	Total votes cast
Kent	44,552	51.19%	41,009	47.12%	1,464	1.69%	3,543	4.07%	87,025
New Castle	195,034	67.81%	88,364	30.72%	4,235	1.47%	106,670	37.09%	287,633
Sussex	56,682	43.82%	71,230	55.07%	1,440	1.11%	-14,548	-11.25%	129,352
Totals	296,268	58.74%	200,603	39.77%	7,475	1.49%	95,665	18.97%	504,346

Counties that flipped from Republican to Democratic

- Kent (largest city: Dover)

==== By congressional district ====
Due to the state's low population, only one congressional district is allocated. This district is called the at-large district, because it covers the entire state, and thus is equivalent to the statewide election results.

District	Trump	Biden	Representative
At-large	39.77%	58.74%	Lisa Blunt Rochester

=== Turnout ===
According to the Delaware's Elections website, voter turnout was 68.86% with 509,241 ballots cast out of 739,570 registered voters.

== See also ==
- United States presidential elections in Delaware
- 2020 United States presidential election
- 2020 Democratic Party presidential primaries
- 2020 Republican Party presidential primaries
- 2020 United States elections
