= Ocean View, Delaware =

- Town
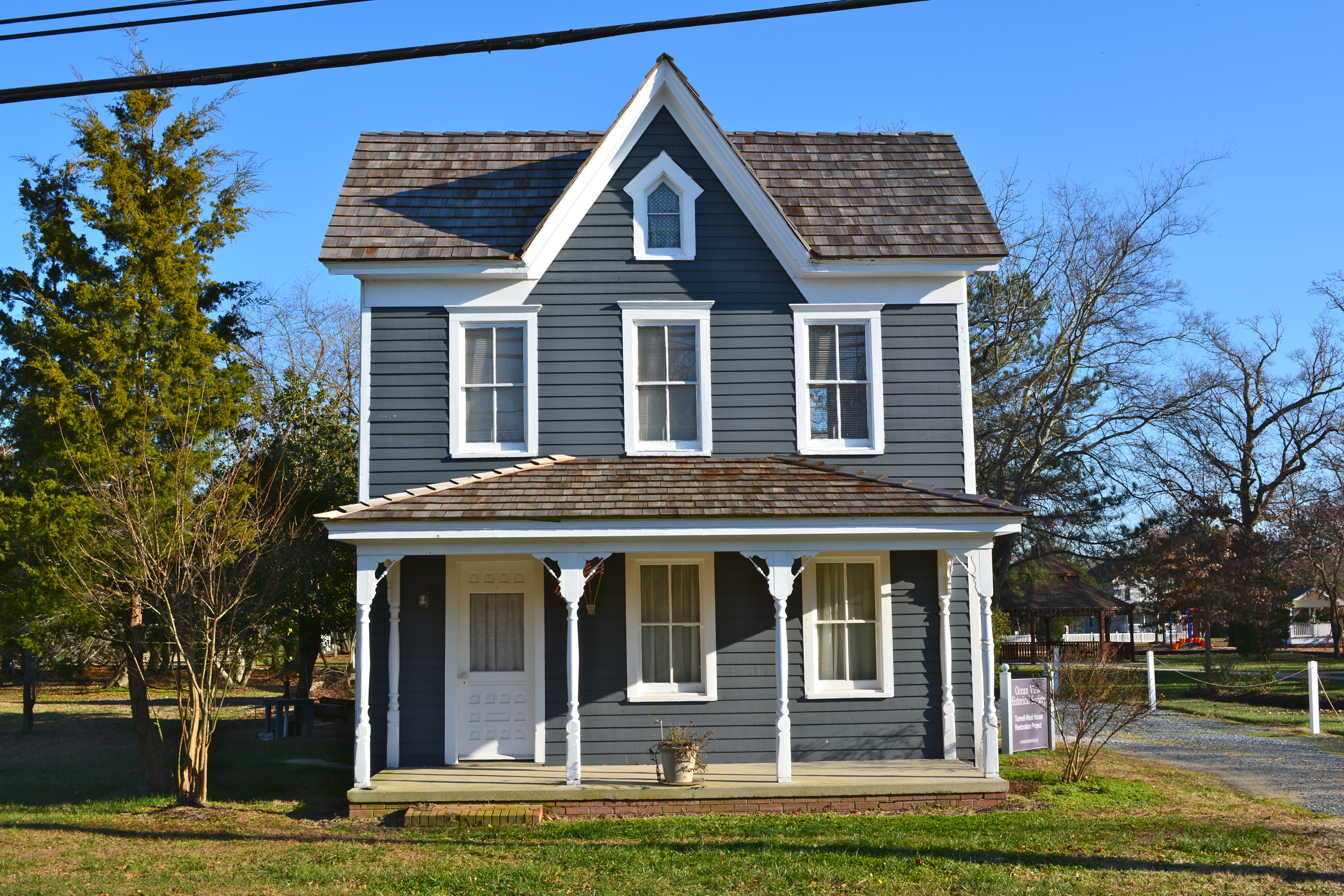
- Tunnell-West House

- Seal
- Motto: "A Place To Come Home To "
- Location of Ocean View in Sussex County, Delaware.

- Location within the state of Delaware Ocean View (the United States)
- Coordinates: 38°32′42″N 75°05′21″W
- Country: United States
- State: Delaware
- County: Sussex

Area
  - Total: 2.80 sq mi (7.24 km^{2})
  - Land: 2.77 sq mi (7.18 km^{2})
  - Water: 0.023 sq mi (0.06 km^{2})
- Elevation: 13 ft (4.0 m)

Population (2020)
  - Total: 2,636
  - Density: 950/sq mi (367/km^{2})
- Time zone: UTC−5 (Eastern (EST))
  - Summer (DST): UTC−4 (EDT)
- ZIP codes: 19967, 19970
- Area code: 302
- FIPS code: 10-53920
- GNIS feature ID: 214403
- Website: www.oceanviewde.gov

Ocean View is a town in Sussex County, Delaware, United States. As of the 2020 census, Ocean View had a population of 2,636. It is part of the Salisbury, Maryland-Delaware Metropolitan Statistical Area and lies in Baltimore Hundred.

Ocean View is fast becoming a bedroom community for the neighboring summer resort of Bethany Beach.

== Geography ==
Ocean View is located at 38°32′42″N 75°05′21″W (38.5451122, –75.0890709). It lies 1 mile (2 km) west of the Atlantic Ocean and 1 mile (2 km) south of Indian River Bay. The Assawoman Canal borders Ocean View on the east and northeast, and Bethany Beach has a short contiguous border with it on the east. On the northwest and west, White's Creek borders the town, and Millville is contiguous with Ocean View on the west. On the south, Ocean View borders unincorporated portions of Sussex County.

According to the United States Census Bureau, the town has a total area of 2.0 square miles (5.2 km^{2}), all of it land.

Ocean View contains three churches, a school, and a town park.

== History ==
Until the late 17th century, European settlers bypassed the area where Ocean View now lies because of the poor quality of its sandy, salty soil and the salt air that blew in from the Atlantic Ocean; they preferred to settle a few miles farther inland, where the land was higher and drier and the soil richer. Would-be settlers also faced a legal complication in obtaining land in what is now Ocean View, because Lord Baltimore claimed the area as part of his Maryland colony, while William Penn asserted that the area belonged to the Delaware Colony; settlers opted to look elsewhere for land to which they could receive clear title from an undisputed authority.

Ocean View traces it origins to 1688, when Lord Baltimore gave a 500-acre (200-hectare) tract of land in what is now Ocean View to its first settler, Matthew Scarborough. Scarborough named his land "Middlesex," and the land became known as Middlesex Plantation. Although the dispute over control of the land eventually was decided in favor of Penn and the land became part of Delaware, Delaware authorities confirmed Scarborough's title to the land as granted by Lord Baltimore.

A few other settlers joined Scarborough around Middlesex Plantation in the years after he settled there. After Scarborough died, the land passed into the hands of the Hazzard family, and by the late 18th century salt-making crews had begun occasional visits to the area on their way to and from salt ponds located closer to the coast.

The Hall family eventually came into possession of the land. W. S. Hall opened a general store on his farm there shortly after 1800. A village known as Hall's Store – the future Ocean View – soon sprang up around the store, and for this reason the members of the Hall family are considered the founders of Ocean View. In 1822 a post office was established in Hall's Store.

Legend has it that a young man climbed a tree in the area and saw the Atlantic Ocean, hence the name Ocean View. After the American Civil War (1861–1865) people began to take an interest in visiting the Atlantic beaches to the east of Hall's Store and it was discovered that the Atlantic Ocean was visible from the second story of some buildings in the village; because of this, Hall's Store was renamed Ocean View. Ocean View was incorporated on April 13, 1889, and held its first town council meeting on April 20, 1889.

The town was an isolated community for much of the 19th century; the nearest railroad, constructed in 1874, came no closer than Dagsboro, and although the opening of the Assawoman Canal – which ran past what had once been Scarborough's Middlesex Plantation – in the late 19th century improved access to Ocean View, it did little to boost the town's economy. Not until the rise of the automobile in the early 20th century did visitors begin to come to Ocean View in increasing numbers.

In 1923, Ocean View became the birthplace of the commercial broiler industry when Mrs. Cecile Long Steele revolutionized the poultry industry by raising the first commercial flock of broiler-fryer-sized chickens there. Although Ocean View itself is no longer involved in the raising of chickens, the industry went on to become Delaware's most important agricultural activity.

After World War II, interest in land near the Delaware beaches increased exponentially as the Delmarva Peninsula became ever-more accessible to automobile traffic from large Eastern cities. The real estate boom spread to Ocean View, increasing land prices there substantially during the latter half of the 20th century.

== Transportation ==
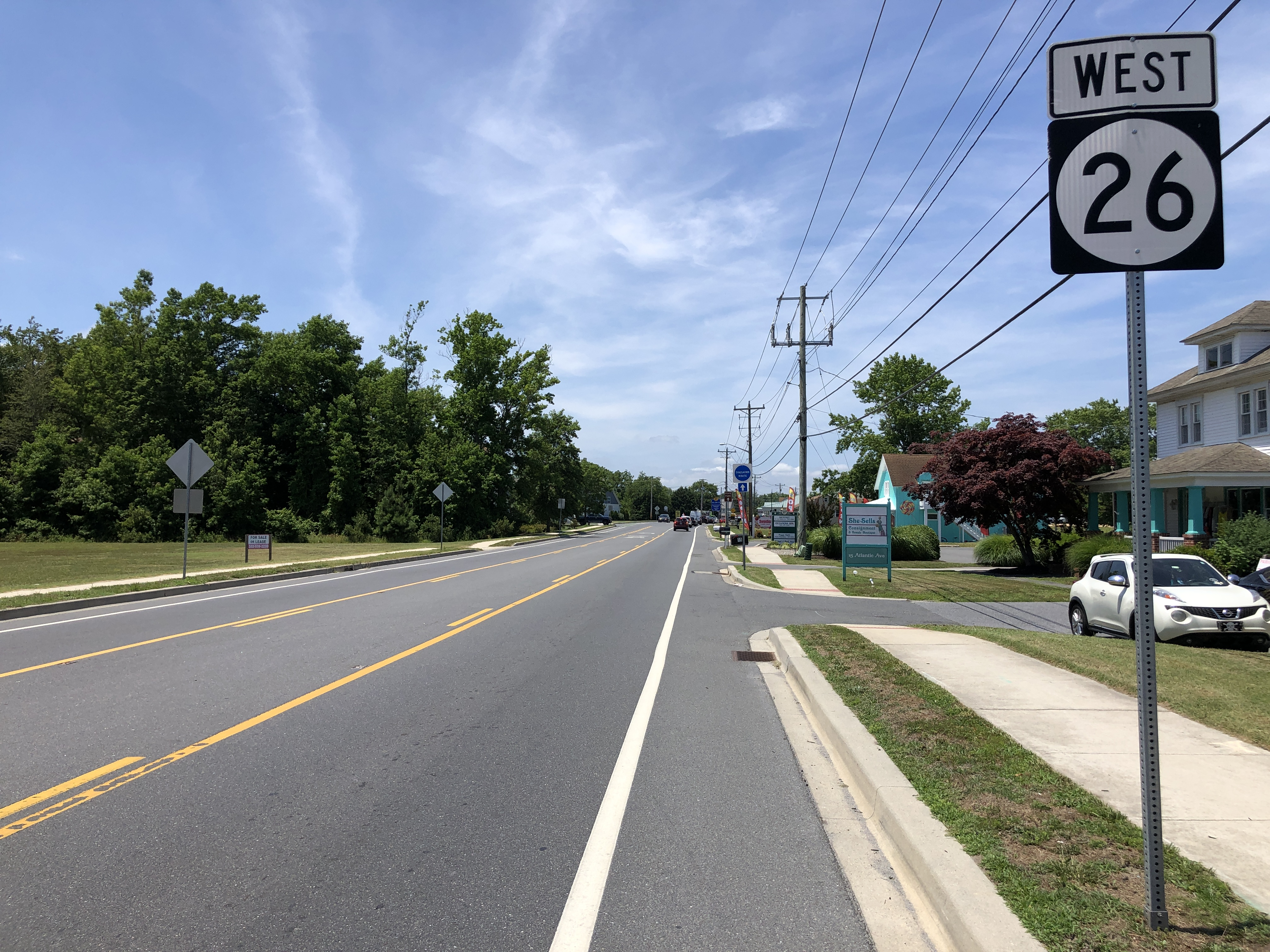
DE 26 westbound in Ocean View

Roads are the main means of transportation to and from Ocean View. Delaware Route 26 is the primary state highway serving the town. It bisects the town on an east–west alignment, heading eastward toward Bethany Beach and west to U.S. Route 113 in Dagsboro. A short section of Delaware Route 54 Alternate also passes through the southeast edge of town.

== Demographics ==
Historical population
Census	Pop.	Note	%±
1910	302		—
1920	279		−7.6%
1930	371		33.0%
1940	406		9.4%
1950	450		10.8%
1960	422		−6.2%
1970	411		−2.6%
1980	495		20.4%
1990	606		22.4%
2000	1,006		66.0%
2010	1,882		87.1%
2020	2,636		40.1%
U.S. Decennial Census

=== 2020 census ===
As of the 2020 census, Ocean View had a population of 2,636. The median age was 63.6 years. 11.3% of residents were under the age of 18 and 46.1% of residents were 65 years of age or older. For every 100 females there were 85.0 males, and for every 100 females age 18 and over there were 83.6 males age 18 and over.

100.0% of residents lived in urban areas, while 0.0% lived in rural areas.

There were 1,308 households in Ocean View, of which 14.4% had children under the age of 18 living in them. Of all households, 56.9% were married-couple households, 13.1% were households with a male householder and no spouse or partner present, and 25.5% were households with a female householder and no spouse or partner present. About 30.0% of all households were made up of individuals and 20.3% had someone living alone who was 65 years of age or older.

There were 2,616 housing units, of which 50.0% were vacant. The homeowner vacancy rate was 1.8% and the rental vacancy rate was 13.8%.

Racial composition as of the 2020 census
Race	Number	Percent
White	2,440	92.6%
Black or African American	19	0.7%
American Indian and Alaska Native	1	0.0%
Asian	47	1.8%
Native Hawaiian and Other Pacific Islander	5	0.2%
Some other race	13	0.5%
Two or more races	111	4.2%
Hispanic or Latino (of any race)	64	2.4%

=== Income and poverty ===
The median household income was $75,852, and 12.1% of the town lived below the poverty line.

=== 2000 census ===
As of the census of 2000, there were 1,006 people, 458 households, and 321 families residing in the town. The population density was 495.0 inhabitants per square mile (191.1/km^{2}). There were 751 housing units at an average density of 369.6 units per square mile (142.7 units/km^{2}). The racial makeup of the town was 97.42% White, 1.09% African American, 0.20% Native American, 0.50% Asian, and 0.80% from two or more races. Hispanic or Latino of any race were 1.19% of the population.

There were 458 households, out of which 19.4% had children under the age of 18 living with them, 62.0% were married couples living together, 6.6% had a female householder with no husband present, and 29.9% were non-families. 25.8% of all households were made up of individuals, and 13.5% had someone living alone who was 65 years of age or older. The average household size was 2.20 and the average family size was 2.61.

In the town, the population was spread out, with 16.0% under the age of 18, 5.1% from 18 to 24, 21.5% from 25 to 44, 29.7% from 45 to 64, and 27.7% who were 65 years of age or older. The median age was 51 years. For every 100 females, there were 91.6 males. For every 100 females age 18 and over, there were 84.9 males.

The median income for a household in the town was $47,500, and the median income for a family was $52,125. Males had a median income of $37,614 versus $31,333 for females. The per capita income for the town was $27,188. About 1.5% of families and 2.8% of the population were below the poverty line, including none of those under age 18 and 5.4% of those age 65 or over.

== Government ==
Presidential election results

Presidential election results in Ocean View
Year	Democratic	Republican	Others
2020	45.7% 747	53.5% 876	0.8% 13
2016	37.7% 492	58.9% 768	3.4% 44

Ocean View has a council-manager form of government. It is governed by mayor and a four-person town council. The town charter of April 1, 2003, lays out the structure of the town's government.

=== Elected officials ===
The mayor presides over town council meetings and represents the town during emergencies and at ceremonial events, but otherwise has no policymaking powers or administrative responsibilities. The mayor is considered equal in powers and duties to each of the council members. The mayor is elected by a plurality of all registered town voters to a three-year term of office and may serve an unlimited number of terms, but may serve no more than two consecutive terms as mayor. After leaving office, a former mayor must wait at least one year before being eligible to seek another term as mayor. However, an outgoing mayor may run for a town council seat immediately upon leaving office as mayor. Anyone 18 years of age or older who is registered to vote and lived in Ocean View for at least two years may run for mayor.

The four town council members are each elected by a plurality of all registered town voters to three-year terms of office. The town is divided into four electoral districts, one for each council member's seat, which are redrawn every ten years based upon U.S. Census results as well as when town boundaries change. Although elected by a plurality of the entire town's voters, each council member must reside in a specific council district. The terms of the council members are staggered so that at least one council member's seat is up for election every year. Like the mayor, each council member may serve an unlimited number of terms on the council, but no more than two terms consecutively, and must wait at least one year after leaving office before being eligible to run for another term on the council. However, a council member may run for mayor immediately upon leaving office as a council member. Anyone 18 years of age or older who is registered to vote and lived in Ocean View for at least one year may run for the town council.

Elections take place every year on the second Saturday in April. Elected candidates take office seven days after the election.

Josh Reddington is currently the town's mayor; he took over for former mayor Walter F. Curran, who reached his term limit in April 2020. Other council members include Frank Twardzik, Berton Reynolds, Bill Olsen, and Tom Maly.

=== Government operations ===
A town manager oversees day-to-day town operations. The town manager is assisted by three department heads: the Administratuve Official/Director of Public Works, the Director of Finance, and the Chief of Police.

The Ocean View Police Department polices the town. Ocean View has no fire department of its own, instead relying on the services of the Millville Volunteer Fire Company in neighboring Millville.

The town manager is Carol Houck. The police department is led by Chief Ken McLaughlin.

== Education ==
Ocean View is in the Indian River School District.
