= List of election bellwether counties in the United States =

Counties that usually vote for presidential election winners

Bellwether counties in the United States are those whose votes back the winning candidate in United States presidential elections.

The strongest bellwether counties are those that do so most frequently. Of the 3,142 counties or county equivalents in the United States only a small handful have voted in alignment with the winner in recent presidential elections.

== Significant bellwethers ==
=== Deviation in one election ===
The following 30 counties have deviated from the winner of the presidential election in one election since 1980.

Overview of bellwether counties in federal elections
Election year of deviation	County	State	County winner	Votes		National winner	Last deviation
1988	Blaine	Montana	Michael Dukakis	1,460	1,402	George H. W. Bush	1912
2000	Pinellas	Florida	Al Gore	200,657	184,849	George W. Bush	1976
2004	Nicollet	Minnesota	John Kerry	8,797	8,689	George W. Bush	1976
2004	Sullivan	New Hampshire	John Kerry	11,434	10,142	George W. Bush	1976
2012	Albany	Wyoming	Mitt Romney	7,866	7,458	Barack Obama	1976
2016	Merced	California	Hillary Clinton	37,317	28,725	Donald Trump	1968
2016	San Bernardino	California	Hillary Clinton	340,833	271,240	Donald Trump	1976
2016	San Joaquin	California	Hillary Clinton	121,124	88,936	Donald Trump	1976
2016	Stanislaus	California	Hillary Clinton	81,647	78,494	Donald Trump	1968
2020	Bremer	Iowa	Donald Trump	8,294	5,958	Joe Biden	1976
2020	Cortland	New York	Donald Trump	10,789	10,369	Joe Biden	1976
2020	Essex	Vermont	Donald Trump	1,773	1,405	Joe Biden	1976
2020	Hidalgo	New Mexico	Donald Trump	1,120	823	Joe Biden	1968
2020	Juneau	Wisconsin	Donald Trump	8,749	4,746	Joe Biden	1960
2020	Marquette	Wisconsin	Donald Trump	5,719	3,239	Joe Biden	1976
2020	Otsego	New York	Donald Trump	14,382	12,975	Joe Biden	1976
2020	Ottawa	Ohio	Donald Trump	14,628	9,008	Joe Biden	1960
2020	Richland	Wisconsin	Donald Trump	4,871	3,995	Joe Biden	1976
2020	Sawyer	Wisconsin	Donald Trump	5,909	4,498	Joe Biden	1960
2020	Shiawassee	Michigan	Donald Trump	23,149	15,347	Joe Biden	1976
2020	Valencia	New Mexico	Donald Trump	17,364	14,623	Joe Biden	1948
2020	Van Buren	Michigan	Donald Trump	21,591	16,803	Joe Biden	1976
2020	Vigo	Indiana	Donald Trump	23,545	18,213	Joe Biden	1952
2020	Warren	Illinois	Donald Trump	4,676	3,090	Joe Biden	1976
2020	Washington	Maine	Donald Trump	10,194	6,761	Joe Biden	1976
2020	Westmoreland	Virginia	Donald Trump	5,318	4,501	Joe Biden	1960
2020	Wood	Ohio	Donald Trump	35,757	30,617	Joe Biden	1976
2024	Clallam	Washington	Kamala Harris	25,440	21,632	Donald Trump	1976

=== Deviations in two elections ===
The following 96 counties have deviated from the winner of the presidential election in two elections since 1980:

- Allamakee County, Iowa, in 1992 and 2020
- Alamosa County, Colorado, in 2016 and 2020
- Baldwin County, Georgia, in 1980 and 2016
- Benzie County, Michigan, in 2012 and 2020
- Bexar County, Texas, in 2016 and 2024
- Blue Earth County, Minnesota, in 1988 and 2004
- Brewster County, Texas, in 2012 and 2020
- Buncombe County, North Carolina, in 2016 and 2024
- Bureau County, Illinois, in 2012 and 2020
- Butte County, California, in 1996 and 2012
- Calhoun County, Michigan, in 2000 and 2020
- Calhoun County, South Carolina, in 1980 and 2020
- Cascade County, Montana, in 2012 and 2020
- Cass County, Michigan, in 2012 and 2020
- Centre County, Pennsylvania, in 2016 and 2024
- Chickasaw County, Mississippi, in 1980 and 2020
- Clackamas County, Oregon in 2016 and 2024
- Clay County, Minnesota, in 1988 and 2024
- Coles County, Illinois, in 2012 and 2020
- Colleton County, South Carolina, in 1980 and 2020
- Columbia County, Wisconsin, in 2000 and 2020
- Coös County, New Hampshire, in 2004 and 2020
- Cayuga County, New York, in 2000 and 2020
- Chautauqua County, New York, in 2012 and 2020
- DeKalb County, Illinois, in 2016 and 2024
- Delaware County, Indiana, in 1992 and 2020
- Door County, Wisconsin, in 1992 and 2024
- Elk County, Pennsylvania, in 2012 and 2020
- Essex County, New York, in 1992 and 2024
- Essex County, Virginia, in 1992 and 2020
- Fresno County, California, in 1996 and 2016
- Gladwin County, Michigan, in 2012 and 2020
- Gloucester County, New Jersey, in 2000 and 2004
- Hill County, Montana, in 1988 and 2020
- Hillsborough County, Florida, in 1992 and 2016
- Hillsborough County, New Hampshire in 1992 and 2024
- Houston County, Minnesota, in 1992 and 2020
- Jefferson County, Iowa, in 2004 and 2020
- Jo Daviess County, Illinois, in 1992 and 2020
- Kankakee County, Illinois, in 2012 and 2020
- Kennebec County, Maine, in 2000 and 2004
- Kent County, Delaware, in 1992 and 2024
- Latah County, Idaho, in 1988 and 2016
- Lenawee County, Michigan, in 2012 and 2020
- Lincoln County, Wisconsin, in 1988 and 2020
- Luna County, New Mexico, in 2012 and 2020
- Madison County, New York, 1992 and 2020
- Manistee County, Michigan, in 2000 and 2020
- Marion County, Oregon, in 1992 and 2012
- Marshall County, Iowa, in 1988 and 2020
- Marshall County, South Dakota, in 1988 and 2020
- Mason County, Illinois, in 2012 and 2020
- McDonough County, Illinois, in 2012 and 2020
- Menominee County, Michigan, in 2012 and 2020
- Monroe County, Michigan, in 2000 and 2020
- Monroe County, Wisconsin, in 2012 and 2020
- Northampton County, Pennsylvania, in 2000 and 2004
- Oconto County, Wisconsin, in 2012 and 2020
- Oneida County, Wisconsin, in 2012 and 2020
- Orange County, New York, in 1992 and 2020
- Orleans County, Vermont, in 2004 and 2016
- Oswego County, New York, in 1992 and 2020
- Penobscot County, Maine, in 2004 and 2020
- Pike County, Mississippi, in 1980 and 2016
- Porter County, Indiana, in 1992 and 2020
- Presque Isle County, Michigan, in 2012 and 2020
- Racine County, Wisconsin, in 1988 and 2020
- Ransom County, North Dakota, in 1988 and 2020
- Riverside County, California, in 1996 and 2016
- Rockingham County, New Hampshire, in 1992 and 2012
- Rockland County, New York, in 2000 and 2016 (Note: This county voted with the popular vote each time. The last time it deviated from the popular vote was in 1976, giving it the longest current streak in the nation.)
- Sandoval County, New Mexico, in 2016 and 2024
- Sandusky County, Ohio, in 1992 and 2020
- Sargent County, North Dakota, in 1988 and 2020
- Saratoga County, New York, in 1992 and 2024
- Sauk County, Wisconsin, in 2000 and 2004
- Schuyler County, Illinois, in 2012 and 2020
- Seneca County, New York, in 2000 and 2020
- Skagit County, Washington, in 2016 and 2024
- Spencer County, Indiana, in 2012 and 2020
- Stark County, Ohio, in 2004 and 2020
- Starke County, Indiana, in 2012 and 2020
- Sullivan County, New York, in 2000 and 2020
- Traverse County, Minnesota, in 1988 and 2020
- Tuscarawas County, Ohio, in 2012 and 2020
- Union County, Iowa, in 1988 and 2020
- Val Verde County, Texas, in 2016 and 2020
- Vanderburgh County, Indiana, in 2012 and 2020
- Ventura County, California, in 2016 and 2024
- Warren County, New York, in 1992 and 2020
- Washington County, New York, in 1992 and 2020
- Watonwan County, Minnesota, in 2012 and 2020
- Will County, Illinois, in 2016 and 2024
- Winnebago County, Illinois in 2016 and 2024
- Winnebago County, Wisconsin, in 1992 and 2020
- Winona County, Minnesota, in 2000 and 2004

== Comparison with random distribution ==
The table above lists counties that have voted for the winning presidential candidate in at least 10 of the 12 elections from 1980 through 2024, yielding 126 counties in total. The probability of this occurring by chance in a completely random distribution is quite low and is statistically significant.

However, the relevance of using a random prediction model to evaluate bellwether counties has been questioned by political analysts. Voting behavior in the United States is not random but is shaped by entrenched demographic, cultural, and political factors. Most counties vote predictably along partisan lines, with many states and regions consistently favoring one party. This predictability undermines the argument that bellwether counties’ alignment with national outcomes is purely a matter of statistical chance.

Bellwether counties are notable because they deviate from this predictability, reflecting a mix of voter demographics and preferences that align with broader national trends. Studies have shown that bellwether counties often mirror key swing states or represent diverse, politically balanced communities. This alignment suggests that their predictive accuracy arises from real-world dynamics rather than randomness.

Critics of the random model argue that it oversimplifies the complexities of electoral behavior and ignores the systemic factors that make bellwether counties significant. For example, they often serve as microcosms of the national electorate, capturing shifts in voting patterns driven by economic, social, and cultural changes. Reducing their accuracy to mere statistical coincidence disregards these deeper insights.

== See also ==
- Political party loyalty of United States counties
