= 2020 United States presidential election in Indiana =

- November 3, 2020
- Turnout: 64.58% (▲6.68 pp)

Nominee	Donald Trump	Joe Biden
Party	Republican	Democratic
Home state	Florida	Delaware
Running mate	Mike Pence	Kamala Harris
Electoral vote	11	0
Popular vote	1,729,857	1,242,498
Percentage	57.03%	40.96%

Trump
40–50%
50–60%
60–70%
70–80%
80–90%
90–100%
Biden
40–50%
50–60%
60–70%
70–80%
80–90%
90–100%
Tie/No Data
President before election
Donald Trump
Republican
Elected President
Joe Biden
Democratic

A presidential election was held in Indiana on Tuesday, November 3, 2020, as part of the 2020 United States presidential election in which all 50 states plus the District of Columbia participated. Indiana voters chose electors to represent them in the Electoral College via a popular vote, pitting the Republican Party's nominee, incumbent President Donald Trump, and running mate Vice President Mike Pence against Democratic Party nominee, former vice president Joe Biden, and his running mate California senator Kamala Harris. Indiana has 11 electoral votes in the Electoral College.

Indiana was the home state of Pence, who served as Governor of Indiana from 2013 to 2017. Pence retained a 59% approval among voters in his home state. On the day of the election, most news organizations considered Indiana a state Trump would win, or a likely red state. Trump won Indiana by 57% to Biden's 41%, a slight increase in his vote share from 2016, but a reduction in his margin of victory.

This election marked the first time since 1952 and only the third time since 1888 that Vigo County, home to Terre Haute and a significant bellwether county, voted for the losing candidate in a presidential election. Biden subsequently became the first presidential nominee of either party since Dwight D. Eisenhower in 1952, and the first Democrat since Grover Cleveland in 1884 to win the presidency without carrying Vigo County.

Biden flipped Tippecanoe County, home to Lafayette and Purdue University, from Republican to Democratic, marking the first time since 1936 that the county voted against Indiana's statewide winner. Biden also became the first Democrat since FDR in 1944 to win without carrying traditionally Democratic Perry County in Southern Indiana. Biden was also the first Democrat to win without LaPorte County since 1976.

== Primary elections ==
The primary elections were held on June 2, 2020.

=== Republican primary ===
Donald Trump won the Republican primary, and received all of the state's 58 delegates to the 2020 Republican National Convention.

=== Democratic primary ===
2020 Indiana Democratic presidential primary
Candidate	Votes	%	Delegates
Joe Biden	380,836	76.48	80
Bernie Sanders (withdrawn)	67,688	13.59	2
Pete Buttigieg (withdrawn)	17,957	3.61	
Elizabeth Warren (withdrawn)	14,344	2.88	
Michael Bloomberg (withdrawn)	4,783	0.96	
Andrew Yang (withdrawn)	4,426	0.89	
Amy Klobuchar (withdrawn)	3,860	0.78	
Tulsi Gabbard (withdrawn)	2,657	0.53	
Tom Steyer (withdrawn)	1,376	0.28	
Total	497,927	100%	82

=== Libertarian nominee ===
The 2020 Libertarian National Convention was held on May 22–24, 2020, selecting Jo Jorgensen, Psychology Senior Lecturer at Clemson University, as their presidential nominee.

=== Green primary ===
The Green primary was held on May 1–31, 2020, with mail-in ballots being post marked no later than June 1, 2020, and results being published by June 14, 2020.

2020 Indiana Green presidential primary
Candidate	Votes	%	Delegates
Howie Hawkins	27	43.50	1.5
Jesse Ventura (not a candidate)	19	30.65	1
Dario Hunter	16	25.89	1
Uncommitted	40	44.14	0.5
Total	111	100.00	4

== General election ==
=== Predictions ===
Source	Ranking	As of
The Cook Political Report	Likely R	October 6, 2020
Inside Elections	Safe R	October 6, 2020
Sabato's Crystal Ball	Likely R	October 6, 2020
Politico	Safe R	October 6, 2020
RCP	Lean R	October 6, 2020
Niskanen	Safe R	October 6, 2020
CNN	Safe R	October 6, 2020
The Economist	Safe R	October 6, 2020
CBS News	Likely R	October 6, 2020
270towin	Safe R	October 6, 2020
ABC News	Safe R	October 6, 2020
NPR	Likely R	October 6, 2020
NBC News	Likely R	October 6, 2020
538	Safe R	October 6, 2020

=== Polling ===
View source data.

==== Aggregate polls ====
Source of poll aggregation	Dates administered	Dates updated	Joe Biden Democratic	Donald Trump Republican	Other/ Undecided (Note: Calculated by taking the difference of 100% and all other candidates combined.)	Margin
270 to Win	October 14 - November 2, 2020	November 3, 2020	42.0%	51.0%	7.0%	Trump +9.0
FiveThirtyEight	until November 2, 2020	November 3, 2020	42.0%	52.9%	5.1%	Trump +10.8

==== Polls ====
Poll source	Date(s) administered	Sample size (Note: Key: A – all adults RV – registered voters LV – likely voters V – unclear)	Margin of error	Donald Trump Republican	Joe Biden Democratic	Jo Jorgensen Libertarian	Other	Undecided
SurveyMonkey/Axios	Oct 20 – Nov 2, 2020	2,729 (LV)	± 2.5%	54% (Note: Overlapping sample with the previous SurveyMonkey/Axios poll, but more information available regarding sample size)	44%	–	–	–
Swayable	Oct 27 – Nov 1, 2020	264 (LV)	± 7.8%	55%	43%	2%	–	–
Morning Consult	Oct 22–31, 2020	1,147 (LV)	± 3%	53%	42%	–	–	–
SurveyMonkey/Axios	Oct 1–28, 2020	4,734 (LV)	–	55%	43%	–	–	–
Swayable	Oct 23–26, 2020	301 (LV)	± 7.4%	53%	42%	5%	–	–
Ragnar Research (R)	Oct 18–21, 2020	529 (LV)	± 4%	48%	40%	5%	–	7%
SurveyUSA/Election Twitter	Oct 10–13, 2020	527 (LV)	± 5.2%	49%	42%	–	3%	6%
SurveyMonkey/Axios	Sep 1–30, 2020	2,367 (LV)	–	53%	45%	–	–	–
Change Research/IndyPolitics	Sep 3–7, 2020	1,033 (LV)	± 3.1%	53%	39%	5%	–	3%
SurveyMonkey/Axios	Aug 1–31, 2020	1,672 (LV)	–	55%	43%	–	–	–
Morning Consult	Jul 24 – Aug 2, 2020 (Note: Additional data sourced from FiveThirtyEight)	900 (LV)	± 3.5%	55%	38%	–	–	–
SurveyMonkey/Axios	Jul 1–31, 2020	2,175 (LV)	–	56%	43%	–	–	–
SurveyMonkey/Axios	Jun 8–30, 2020	929 (LV)	–	57%	40%	–	–	–
Victoria Research/Tallian for Attorney General (Note: This poll is sponsored by Karen Tallian's campaign (D))	May 21–23, 2020	894 (LV)	± 3.3%	49%	39%	–	–	–
Indy Politics/Change Research	Apr 10–13, 2020	1,021 (LV)	± 3.1%	52%	39%	–	5%	3%

Former candidates

Donald Trump vs. Elizabeth Warren

Poll source	Date(s) administered	Sample size	Margin of error	Donald Trump (R)	Elizabeth Warren (D)	Undecided
Zogby Analytics	Aug 17–23, 2017	603 (LV)	± 4.0%	45%	39%	17%

=== Results ===
2020 United States presidential election in Indiana
Party	Candidate	Votes	%	±%
Republican	Donald Trump (incumbent) Mike Pence (incumbent)	1,729,857	57.03%	▲0.09%
Democratic	Joe Biden Kamala Harris	1,242,498	40.96%	▲3.19%
Libertarian	Jo Jorgensen Spike Cohen	58,901	1.94%	▼2.96%
Green	Howie Hawkins (write-in) Angela Walker (write-in)	989	0.03%	▼0.26%
American Solidarity	Brian T. Carroll (write-in) Amar Patel (write-in)	895	0.03%	N/A
Write-in		70	0.00%	▼0.03%
Total votes		3,033,210	100.00%	N/A

==== By county ====
County	Donald Trump Republican		Joe Biden Democratic		Various candidates Other parties		Margin		Total
County	#	%	#	%	#	%	#	%	Total
Adams	10,686	75.05%	3,236	22.73%	287	2.0%	7,450	52.43%	14,209
Allen	92,083	54.31%	73,189	43.16%	4,288	2.53%	18,894	11.15%	169,560
Bartholomew	22,410	61.74%	12,934	35.63%	956	2.63%	9,476	26.11%	36,300
Benton	3,007	73.07%	1,009	24.52%	99	2.41%	1,998	48.55%	4,115
Blackford	3,841	71.69%	1,376	25.68%	141	2.63%	2,465	46.01%	5,358
Boone	22,351	57.80%	15,244	39.42%	1,073	2.78%	7,107	18.38%	38,668
Brown	5,777	64.32%	3,036	33.80%	168	1.88%	2,741	30.52%	8,981
Carroll	7,086	74.48%	2,224	23.38%	204	2.14%	4,862	51.10%	9,514
Cass	10,552	69.43%	4,304	28.32%	342	2.25%	6,248	41.11%	15,198
Clark	33,668	57.99%	23,093	39.78%	1,296	2.23%	10,575	18.21%	58,057
Clay	9,499	77.35%	2,552	20.78%	220	1.87%	6,947	56.57%	12,281
Clinton	9,334	72.02%	3,361	25.93%	266	2.05%	5,973	46.09%	12,961
Crawford	3,483	70.39%	1,355	27.38%	110	2.23%	2,128	43.01%	4,948
Daviess	9,576	79.99%	2,169	18.12%	226	1.89%	7,407	61.87%	11,971
Dearborn	19,528	76.78%	5,446	21.41%	460	1.81%	14,082	55.37%	25,434
Decatur	9,575	77.82%	2,439	19.82%	290	2.36%	7,136	58.00%	12,304
DeKalb	14,237	72.43%	4,966	25.26%	453	2.31%	9,271	47.17%	19,656
Delaware	26,827	55.49%	20,474	42.35%	1,041	2.16%	6,353	13.14%	48,342
Dubois	15,033	68.94%	6,292	28.85%	481	2.21%	8,741	40.09%	21,806
Elkhart	46,972	62.95%	26,108	34.99%	1,538	2.06%	20,864	27.96%	74,618
Fayette	7,755	76.43%	2,237	22.05%	154	1.52%	5,518	54.38%	10,146
Floyd	23,400	55.85%	17,511	41.79%	988	2.36%	5,889	14.06%	41,899
Fountain	6,154	76.99%	1,629	20.38%	210	2.63%	4,525	56.61%	7,993
Franklin	9,691	80.64%	2,137	17.78%	190	1.58%	7,554	62.86%	12,018
Fulton	6,694	73.18%	2,280	24.93%	173	1.89%	4,414	48.25%	9,147
Gibson	11,817	73.12%	4,023	24.89%	321	1.99%	7,794	48.23%	16,161
Grant	18,543	68.10%	8,015	29.43%	672	2.47%	10,528	38.67%	27,230
Greene	11,103	74.98%	3,389	22.89%	315	2.13%	7,714	52.09%	14,807
Hamilton	101,587	52.21%	88,390	45.43%	4,600	2.36%	13,197	6.78%	194,577
Hancock	28,996	67.40%	12,895	29.97%	1,129	2.63%	16,101	37.43%	43,020
Harrison	14,565	71.98%	5,343	26.40%	328	1.62%	9,222	45.58%	20,236
Hendricks	53,802	60.65%	32,604	36.76%	2,299	2.59%	21,198	23.89%	88,705
Henry	15,043	71.43%	5,544	26.32%	474	2.25%	9,499	45.11%	21,061
Howard	26,449	65.10%	13,303	32.74%	878	2.16%	13,146	32.36%	40,630
Huntington	13,147	73.57%	4,255	23.81%	468	2.62%	8,892	49.76%	17,870
Jackson	14,555	75.66%	4,302	22.36%	381	1.98%	10,253	53.30%	19,238
Jasper	11,383	73.56%	3,798	24.54%	294	1.90%	7,585	49.02%	15,475
Jay	6,361	75.14%	1,926	22.75%	179	2.11%	4,435	52.39%	8,466
Jefferson	9,663	65.60%	4,731	32.12%	336	2.28%	4,932	33.48%	14,730
Jennings	9,490	77.29%	2,523	20.55%	265	2.16%	6,967	56.74%	12,278
Johnson	51,219	65.83%	24,736	31.79%	1,847	2.38%	26,483	34.04%	77,802
Knox	11,655	72.72%	4,067	25.37%	306	1.91%	7,588	47.35%	16,028
Kosciusko	26,499	73.85%	8,364	23.31%	1,021	2.84%	18,135	50.54%	35,884
LaGrange	8,110	76.14%	2,355	22.11%	187	1.75%	5,755	54.03%	10,652
Lake	91,760	41.65%	124,870	56.67%	3,700	1.68%	-33,110	-15.02%	220,330
LaPorte	25,997	52.54%	22,427	45.32%	1,059	2.14%	3,570	7.22%	49,483
Lawrence	15,601	74.04%	4,961	23.54%	509	2.42%	10,640	50.50%	21,071
Madison	31,215	60.16%	19,524	37.63%	1,151	2.21%	11,691	22.53%	51,890
Marion	134,175	34.30%	247,772	63.35%	9,187	2.35%	-113,597	-29.05%	391,134
Marshall	13,844	69.38%	5,712	28.63%	397	1.99%	8,132	40.75%	19,953
Martin	4,029	78.16%	1,011	19.61%	115	2.23%	3,018	58.55%	5,155
Miami	10,925	75.38%	3,235	22.32%	333	2.30%	7,690	53.06%	14,493
Monroe	22,071	34.95%	39,861	63.12%	1,219	1.93%	-17,790	-28.17%	63,151
Montgomery	12,659	73.61%	4,213	24.50%	326	1.89%	8,446	49.11%	17,198
Morgan	27,512	75.96%	7,781	21.48%	928	2.56%	19,731	54.48%	36,221
Newton	4,942	74.78%	1,509	22.83%	158	2.39%	3,433	51.95%	6,609
Noble	14,195	73.87%	4,660	24.25%	362	1.88%	9,535	49.62%	19,217
Ohio	2,392	75.60%	750	23.70%	22	0.70%	1,642	51.90%	3,164
Orange	6,432	72.73%	2,224	25.15%	188	2.12%	4,208	47.58%	8,844
Owen	7,286	73.47%	2,420	24.40%	211	2.13%	4,866	49.07%	9,917
Parke	5,400	76.90%	1,503	21.40%	119	1.70%	3,897	55.50%	7,022
Perry	5,345	61.18%	3,203	36.66%	189	2.16%	2,142	24.52%	8,737
Pike	4,692	75.37%	1,415	22.73%	118	1.90%	3,277	52.64%	6,225
Porter	45,008	51.87%	39,746	45.81%	2,014	2.32%	5,262	6.06%	86,768
Posey	9,209	69.38%	3,817	28.76%	247	1.86%	5,392	40.62%	13,273
Pulaski	4,246	73.04%	1,463	25.17%	104	1.79%	2,783	47.87%	5,813
Putnam	12,278	73.86%	3,946	23.74%	399	2.40%	8,332	50.12%	16,623
Randolph	8,312	75.02%	2,513	22.68%	254	2.30%	5,799	52.34%	11,079
Ripley	11,261	78.79%	2,774	19.41%	257	1.80%	8,487	59.38%	14,292
Rush	6,035	76.00%	1,754	22.09%	152	1.91%	4,281	53.91%	7,941
Scott	7,331	72.00%	2,701	26.53%	150	1.47%	4,630	45.47%	10,182
Shelby	14,568	72.78%	5,023	25.09%	426	2.13%	9,545	47.69%	20,017
Spencer	7,357	68.19%	3,213	29.78%	219	2.03%	4,144	38.41%	10,789
St. Joseph	53,164	46.13%	59,896	51.98%	2,178	1.89%	-6,732	-5.85%	115,238
Starke	7,469	72.42%	2,651	25.71%	193	1.87%	4,818	46.71%	10,313
Steuben	11,327	69.99%	4,513	27.89%	344	2.12%	6,814	42.10%	16,184
Sullivan	6,691	74.28%	2,153	23.90%	164	1.82%	4,538	50.38%	9,008
Switzerland	3,133	75.33%	964	23.18%	62	1.49%	2,169	52.15%	4,159
Tippecanoe	34,581	48.15%	35,017	48.75%	2,226	3.10%	-436	-0.60%	71,824
Tipton	6,110	75.21%	1,834	22.58%	180	2.21%	4,276	52.63%	8,124
Union	2,688	76.98%	736	21.08%	68	1.94%	1,952	55.90%	3,492
Vanderburgh	41,844	53.88%	34,415	44.31%	1,403	1.81%	7,429	9.57%	77,662
Vermillion	5,184	69.21%	2,145	28.64%	161	2.15%	3,039	40.57%	7,490
Vigo	24,545	56.17%	18,123	41.47%	1,030	2.36%	6,422	14.70%	43,698
Wabash	10,762	73.72%	3,494	23.93%	342	2.35%	7,268	49.79%	14,598
Warren	3,401	76.03%	974	21.78%	98	2.19%	2,427	54.25%	4,473
Warrick	21,326	62.93%	11,923	35.18%	641	1.89%	9,403	27.75%	33,890
Washington	9,114	75.08%	2,784	22.93%	241	1.99%	6,330	52.15%	12,139
Wayne	17,567	63.47%	9,524	34.41%	588	2.12%	8,043	29.06%	27,679
Wells	10,855	77.10%	2,928	20.80%	297	2.10%	7,927	56.30%	14,080
White	7,957	71.13%	3,032	27.10%	198	1.77%	4,925	44.03%	11,187
Whitley	12,862	73.13%	4,234	24.07%	492	2.80%	8,628	49.06%	17,588
Totals	1,729,863	56.91%	1,242,505	40.87%	67,413	2.22%	487,358	16.04%	3,039,781

Counties that flipped from Republican to Democratic

- Tippecanoe (largest city: Lafayette)

==== By congressional district ====
Trump won seven of nine congressional districts.

District	Trump	Biden	Representative
1st	45%	54%	Frank J. Mrvan
2nd	59%	39%	Jackie Walorski
3rd	64%	34%	Jim Banks
4th	64%	34%	Jim Baird
5th	50%	48%	Victoria Spartz
6th	69%	29%	Greg Pence
7th	35%	63%	André Carson
8th	65%	33%	Larry Bucshon
9th	61%	37%	Trey Hollingsworth

== Analysis ==
Biden significantly reduced the Republican margin in Hamilton County, a suburban county in the Indianapolis metropolitan area that is the state's fourth-most populous county. Hamilton County has never supported a candidate of the Democratic Party for president except for 1912, when the split in the Republicans allowed Woodrow Wilson to carry the county with a 34.9% plurality. Hamilton broke 60%-38% for John McCain in 2008, when Barack Obama won Indiana. Mitt Romney won Hamilton County 66%–32% in 2012 and Trump won it 56%-37% in 2016, nearly identical to his statewide margin. In this election, Trump narrowly won Hamilton County, 52%-45%, a margin that is to the left of the statewide result. Biden's 45% vote share in Hamilton County is higher than that of even Lyndon B. Johnson in his nationwide landslide in 1964 and higher than that of Franklin D. Roosevelt in 1936. Biden's vote share in Hamilton is only equaled by Roosevelt's 44.85% share in his 1932 landslide.

== See also ==
- United States presidential elections in Indiana
- 2020 Indiana elections
- 2020 United States presidential election
- 2020 Democratic Party presidential primaries
- 2020 Republican Party presidential primaries
- 2020 Libertarian Party presidential primaries
- 2020 United States elections

== Notes ==
Partisan clients
