= Tunnell–West House =

Historic house in Delaware, United States

- U.S. National Register of Historic Places
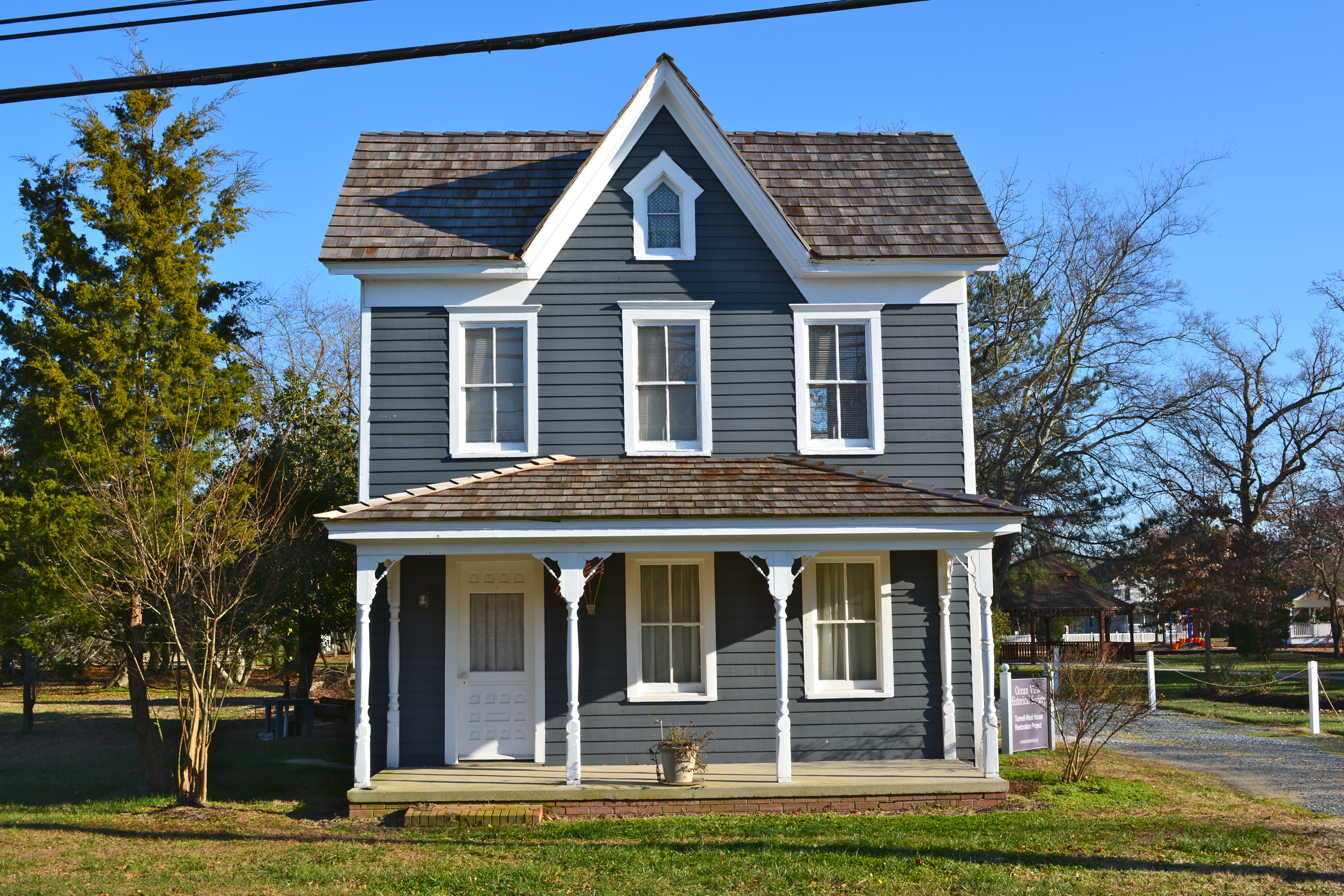

- Location within Delaware Location within the United States
- Location: 39 Central Ave., Ocean View, Delaware
- Coordinates: 38°32′53″N 75°05′22″W
- Built: c. 1868
- Architectural style: Gothic Revival
- NRHP reference No.: 12000379
- Added to NRHP: July 3, 2012

The Tunnell–West House is a historic house at 39 Central Avenue in Ocean View, Delaware. The 2 1/2-story wood-frame house was built sometime between 1868 and 1890, and is a distinctive local example of vernacular Gothic Revival style. Elements of the building's interior are particularly well preserved, including door hardware and trim elements. The local historical society is adapting the house for use as a museum.

The house was listed on the National Register of Historic Places in 2012.

== See also ==
- National Register of Historic Places listings in Sussex County, Delaware
