= 2016 United States presidential election in Delaware =

- November 8, 2016
- Turnout: 65.35% ▲

Nominee	Hillary Clinton	Donald Trump
Party	Democratic	Republican
Home state	New York	New York
Running mate	Tim Kaine	Mike Pence
Electoral vote	3	0
Popular vote	235,603	185,127
Percentage	53.09%	41.71%

Clinton
40–50%
50–60%
60–70%
70–80%
80–90%
90–100%
Trump
40–50%
50–60%
60–70%
70–80%
80–90%
No Votes
President before election
Barack Obama
Democratic
Elected President
Donald Trump
Republican

Treemap of the popular vote by county

The 2016 United States presidential election in Delaware was held on Tuesday, November 8, 2016, as part of the 2016 United States presidential election in which all 50 states plus the District of Columbia participated. Delaware voters chose electors to represent them in the Electoral College via a popular vote, pitting the Republican Party's nominee, businessman Donald Trump, and running mate Indiana Governor Mike Pence against Democratic Party nominee, former Secretary of State Hillary Clinton, and her running mate Virginia Senator Tim Kaine. Delaware has three electoral votes in the Electoral College.

Clinton carried the state with 53.1% of the vote to Trump's 41.7%, a victory margin of 11.38% Although Democrats continued their streak of winning Delaware, a state that has not gone to the Republicans in a presidential election since 1988, it swung 7.19% to the right relative to 2012, and Trump managed to flip Kent County. This was the first time since 1968 that Delaware did not vote for the same candidate as neighboring Pennsylvania. As of 2024, this is the last time the Republican nominee won Kent county with Trump failing to win the county again in both of his next presidential runs in 2020 and 2024.

== Primary elections ==
=== Democratic primary ===
Five candidates appeared on the Democratic presidential primary ballot:

- Hillary Clinton
- Rocky De La Fuente
- Martin O'Malley (withdrawn)
- Bernie Sanders

==== Results ====
Election results by county. Hillary Clinton

2016 Democratic Party's presidential nominating process in Delaware – Summary of results –
Candidate	Popular vote		Estimated delegates		
Candidate	Count	Percentage	Pledged	Unpledged	Total
Hillary Clinton	55,954	59.75%	12	11	23
Bernie Sanders	36,662	39.15%	9	0	9
Roque De La Fuente	1,024	1.09%			
Uncommitted	—N/a		0	0	0
Total	93,640	100%	21	11	32

=== Republican primary ===
Republican primary results by county: Donald Trump: 50–60%; 60–70%; 70–80%

Six candidates appeared on the Republican presidential primary ballot:

- Jeb Bush (withdrawn)
- Ben Carson (withdrawn)
- Ted Cruz
- John Kasich
- Marco Rubio (suspended, to convention)
- Donald Trump

==== Results ====
Delaware Republican primary, April 26, 2016
Candidate	Votes	Percentage	Actual delegate count		
Candidate	Votes	Percentage	Bound	Unbound	Total
Donald Trump	42,472	60.77%	16	0	16
John Kasich	14,225	20.35%	0	0	0
Ted Cruz	11,110	15.90%	0	0	0
Ben Carson (withdrawn)	885	1.27%	0	0	0
Marco Rubio (withdrawn)	622	0.89%	0	0	0
Jeb Bush (withdrawn)	578	0.83%	0	0	0
Unprojected delegates:			0	0	0
Total:	69,892	100.00%	16	0	16
Source: The Green Papers

=== Green convention ===
On April 2, 2016, the Green Party of Delaware announced that all four of its delegates would support Jill Stein at the national convention.

Delaware Green Party Convention, April 2, 2016
Candidate	Votes	Percentage	National delegates
Jill Stein	14	100%	4
William Kreml	-	-	-
Sedinam Kinamo Christin Moyowasifza Curry	-	-	-
Kent Mesplay	-	-	-
Darryl Cherney	-	-	-
Total	14	100%	4

== General election ==
=== Predictions ===
Source	Ranking	As of
Los Angeles Times	Safe D	November 6, 2016
CNN	Safe D	November 4, 2016
Cook Political Report	Safe D	November 7, 2016
Electoral-vote.com	Safe D	November 8, 2016
Sabato's Crystal Ball	Safe D	November 7, 2016
Fox News	Safe D	November 7, 2016

=== Results ===
2016 United States presidential election in Delaware
Party	Candidate	Votes	%
Democratic	Hillary Clinton	235,603	53.09%
Republican	Donald Trump	185,127	41.71%
Libertarian	Gary Johnson	14,757	3.33%
Green	Jill Stein	6,103	1.37%
Independent	Evan McMullin (write-in)	706	0.16%
Constitution	Darrell Castle (write-in)	74	0.02%
	Write-in (other)	1,444	0.32%
Total votes		443,814	100.00%

==== By county ====
County	Hillary Clinton Democratic		Donald Trump Republican		Various candidates Other parties		Margin		Total votes cast
County	#	%	#	%	#	%	#	%	Total votes cast
Kent	33,351	44.63%	36,991	49.50%	4,387	5.87%	-3,640	-4.87%	74,729
New Castle	162,919	61.95%	85,525	32.52%	14,535	5.53%	77,394	29.43%	262,979
Sussex	39,333	37.07%	62,611	59.01%	4,162	3.92%	-23,278	-21.94%	106,106
Totals	235,603	53.09%	185,127	41.71%	23,084	5.20%	50,476	11.38%	443,814

Counties that flipped from Democratic to Republican

- Kent (largest city: Dover)

==== By congressional district ====
Due to the state's low population, only one congressional district is allocated. This district is called the at-large district, because it covers the entire state, and thus is equivalent to the statewide election results.

District	Trump	Clinton	Representative
At-large	41.72%	53.09%	Lisa Blunt Rochester

=== Turnout ===
According to Delaware's Elections website, voter turnout was 65.57% with 445,228 ballots cast out of 679,027 registered voters.

== See also ==
- United States presidential elections in Delaware
- 2016 Democratic Party presidential debates and forums
- 2016 Democratic Party presidential primaries
- 2016 Republican Party presidential debates and forums
- 2016 Republican Party presidential primaries
