= 2020 Indiana elections =

Indiana elections, 2020
- November 3, 2020

The Indiana state elections in 2020 were held on Tuesday, November 3, 2020. The primary elections were held on June 2, 2020. Primary candidates for the 2020 Attorney General election were not selected in the primary, but in a primary convention on June 20, 2020.

In addition to the U.S. presidential race, Indiana voters elected the Governor of Indiana, two of Indiana's executive officers, all of Indiana's seats to the House of Representatives, all of the seats of the Indiana House of Representatives, and 25 of 50 seats in the Indiana Senate. Neither of the state's two U.S. Senate seats were up for election in 2020.

== Federal offices ==
=== President of the United States ===
Indiana, a stronghold for the Republican Party and thus a reliable red state, had 11 electoral votes in the Electoral College. Republican Donald Trump won all of them with 57% of the popular vote.

=== United States House of Representatives ===
Nine U.S. Representatives in Indiana were up for election. Republicans won seven of them while Democrats won two. No seats changed hands.

== State executive offices ==
=== Governor ===
The position of the Governor of Indiana was up for election. Incumbent Republican Eric Holcomb won re-election with 56.51% of the votes.

=== Attorney general ===
The position of the Indiana Attorney General was up for election. Republican Todd Rokita won the general election with 58.3% of the votes.

=== State legislature ===
All 100 seats of the Indiana House of Representatives and 25 of 50 seats of the Indiana Senate were up for election.

==== Senate ====
Before the election the composition of the state senate was:

Party	# of seats
Republican	40
Democratic	10
Total	50

After the election, the composition was:

Party	# of seats
Republican	39
Democratic	11
Total	50

==== House of Representatives ====
Before the election the composition of the state house was:

Party	# of seats
Republican	67
Democratic	33
Total	100

After the election, the composition was:

Party	# of seats
Republican	71
Democratic	29
Total	100
