= 1996 United States presidential election in Delaware =

- November 5, 1996

Nominee	Bill Clinton	Bob Dole	Ross Perot
Party	Democratic	Republican	Independent
Alliance			Reform
Home state	Arkansas	Kansas	Texas
Running mate	Al Gore	Jack Kemp	Patrick Choate
Electoral vote	3	0	0
Popular vote	140,355	99,062	28,719
Percentage	51.78%	36.54%	10.59%
County results
Clinton
40–50%
50–60%
President before election
Bill Clinton
Democratic
Elected President
Bill Clinton
Democratic

The 1996 United States presidential election in Delaware took place on November 5, 1996, as part of the 1996 United States presidential election. Voters chose three representatives, or electors to the Electoral College, who voted for president and vice president.

Delaware was won by President Bill Clinton (D) over Senator Bob Dole (R-KS), with Clinton winning 51.78% to 36.54% by a margin of 15.24%. Billionaire businessman Ross Perot (Reform Party of the United States of America-TX) finished in third, with 10.59% of the popular vote. As of the 2024 presidential election, this is the last election in which Sussex County voted for the Democratic candidate, and the last time a presidential candidate won all three counties in the state.

Among white voters, 47% supported Clinton, 42% supported Dole, and 9% supported Perot.

== Results ==
1996 United States presidential election in Delaware
Party	Candidate	Votes	%
Democratic	Bill Clinton (inc.)	140,355	51.78%
Republican	Bob Dole	99,062	36.54%
Independent	Ross Perot	28,719	10.59%
Libertarian	Harry Browne	2,052	0.76%
U. S. Taxpayers	Howard Phillips	348	0.13%
Natural Law	John Hagelin	274	0.10%
Write-in	Ralph Nader	156	0.06%
Write-in	All Others	118	0.04%
Total votes		271,084	100.00%

=== By county ===
County	Bill Clinton Democratic		Bob Dole Republican		Various candidates Other parties		Margin		Total votes cast
County	#	%	#	%	#	%	#	%	Total votes cast
Kent	18,327	46.69%	15,932	40.59%	4,993	12.72%	2,395	6.10%	39,252
New Castle	98,837	55.05%	60,943	33.94%	19,766	11.01%	37,894	21.11%	179,546
Sussex	23,191	44.59%	22,187	42.66%	6,634	12.75%	1,004	1.93%	52,012
Totals	140,355	51.78%	99,062	36.54%	31,667	11.68%	41,293	15.24%	271,084

Counties that flipped from Republican to Democratic

- Kent
- Sussex

=== By congressional district ===
Due to the state's low population, only 1 congressional district, Delaware's at-large congressional district is allocated.

District	Dole	Clinton	Representative
At-large	36.54%	51.78%	Mike Castle

== See also ==
- United States presidential elections in Delaware
