= 2012 United States presidential election in Delaware =

- November 6, 2012

Nominee	Barack Obama	Mitt Romney
Party	Democratic	Republican
Home state	Illinois	Massachusetts
Running mate	Joe Biden	Paul Ryan
Electoral vote	3	0
Popular vote	242,584	165,484
Percentage	58.61%	39.98%

Obama
50–60%
60–70%
70–80%
80–90%
90–100%
Romney
50–60%
60–70%
President before election
Barack Obama
Democratic
Elected President
Barack Obama
Democratic

The 2012 United States presidential election in Delaware took place on November 6, 2012, as part of the 2012 United States presidential election in which all 50 states plus the District of Columbia participated. Delaware voters chose three electors to represent them in the Electoral College via a popular vote pitting incumbent Democratic President Barack Obama and his running mate, Vice President Joe Biden, against Republican challenger and former Massachusetts Governor Mitt Romney and his running mate, Congressman Paul Ryan.

Biden's home state (and the state for whom he served as Senator from 1973 to 2009), Delaware decisively backed the Democratic ticket, with Obama carrying it by 18.63 percentage points. Widely considered a safe blue state in recent decades, all major news organizations expected this result, as no Republican presidential candidate has carried Delaware since 1988, making it part of the blue wall (states carried by Democrats in every election from 1992 to 2012).

== Primary elections ==
=== Democratic primary ===
The Democratic primary in Delaware was cancelled as President Obama was the only candidate to file for the ballot and received Delaware's entire delegation.

=== Republican primary ===
2012 Delaware Republican presidential primary
- April 24, 2012

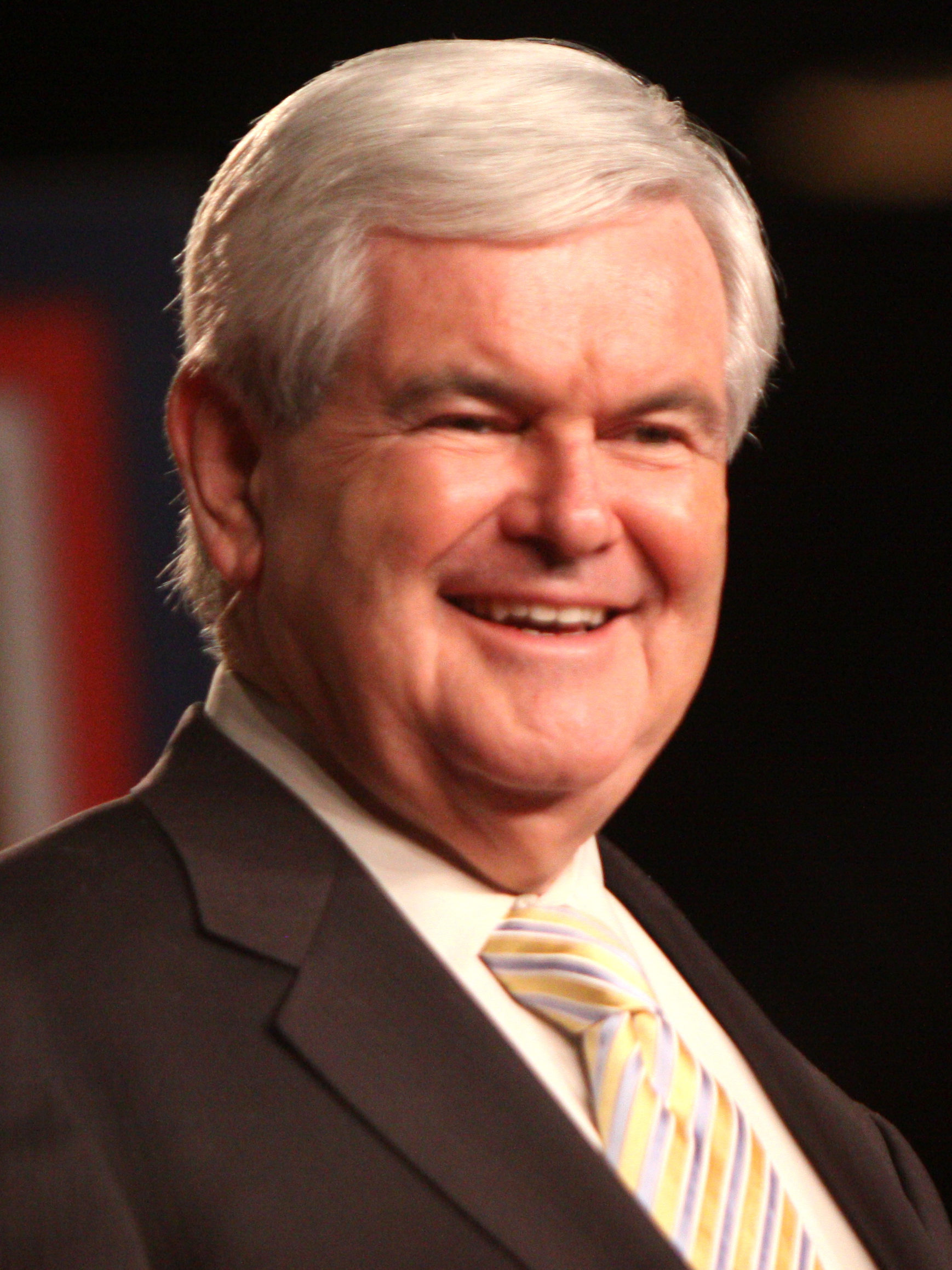

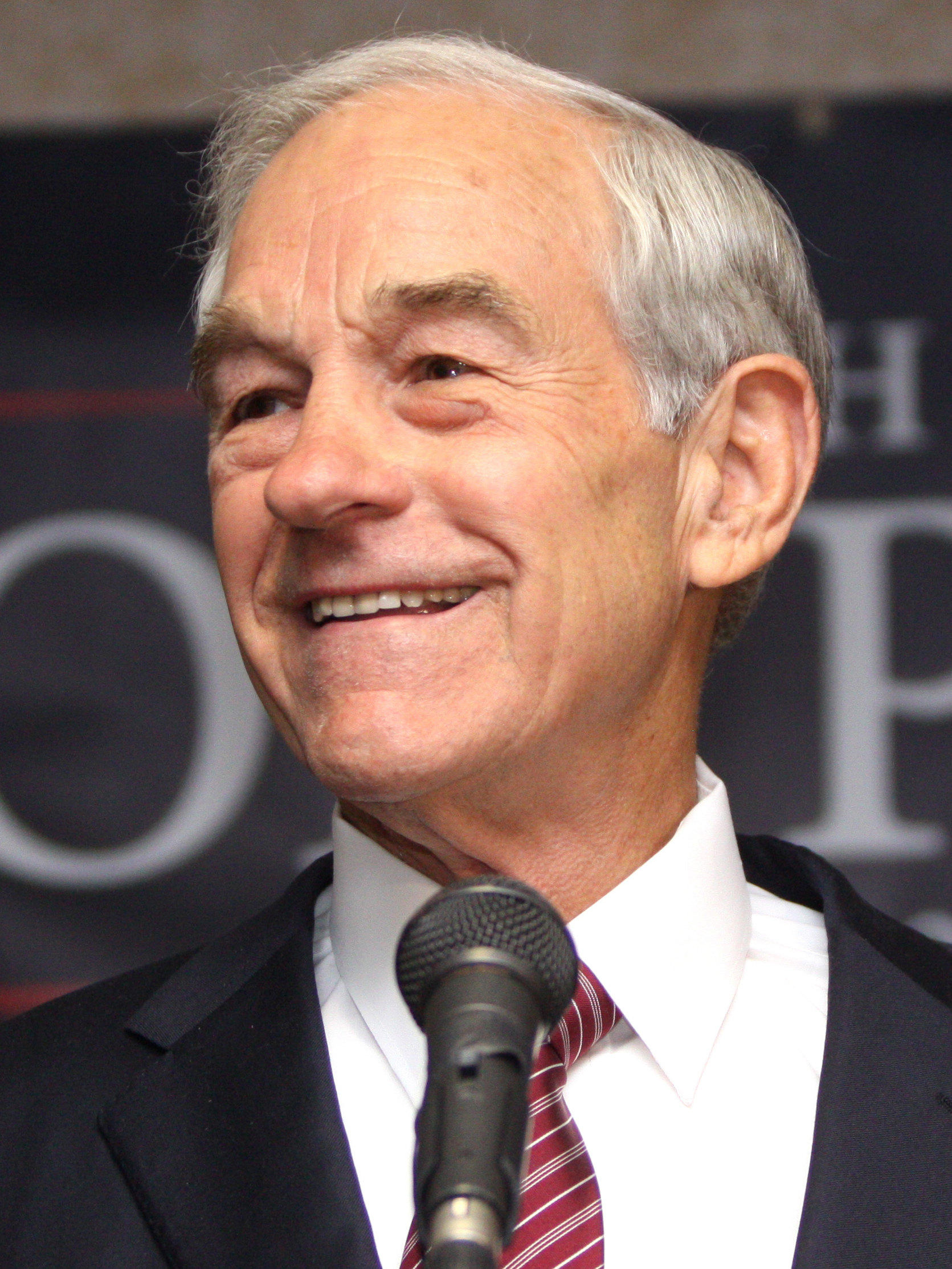
Candidate	Mitt Romney	Newt Gingrich	Ron Paul
Home state	Massachusetts	Georgia	Texas
Delegate count	17	0	0
Popular vote	16,143	7,742	3,017
Percentage	56.5%	27.1%	10.6%
- Delaware results by county Mitt Romney

The 2012 Delaware Republican presidential primary took place on April 24, 2012.

Delaware Republican primary, 2012
Candidate	Votes	Percentage	Delegates
Mitt Romney	16,143	56.5%	17
Newt Gingrich	7,742	27.1%	0
Ron Paul	3,017	10.6%	0
Rick Santorum	1,690	5.9%	0
Unprojected delegates:			0
Total:	28,592	100%	17

Key:	Withdrew prior to contest

== General election ==
=== Predictions ===
Source	Ranking	As of
Huffington Post	Safe D	November 6, 2012
CNN	Safe D	November 6, 2012
The New York Times	Safe D	November 6, 2012
The Washington Post	Safe D	November 6, 2012
RealClearPolitics	Solid D	November 6, 2012
Sabato's Crystal Ball	Solid D	November 5, 2012
FiveThirtyEight	Solid D	November 6, 2012

=== Candidate ballot access ===
- Mitt Romney/Paul Ryan, Republican
- Barack Obama/Joseph Biden, Democratic
- Gary Johnson/James P. Gray, Libertarian
- Jill Stein/Cheri Honkala, Green

Write-in candidate access:

- Rocky Anderson/Luis J. Rodriguez, Justice

=== Results ===
2012 United States presidential election in Delaware
Party	Candidate	Running mate	Votes	Percentage	Electoral votes
Democratic	Barack Obama (incumbent)	Joe Biden (incumbent)	242,584	58.61%	3
Republican	Mitt Romney	Paul Ryan	165,484	39.98%	0
Libertarian	Gary Johnson	Jim Gray	3,882	0.94%	0
Green	Jill Stein	Cheri Honkala	1,940	0.47%	0
Write-ins	-	-	31	0.01%	0
Totals			413,921	100.00%	3
Voter turnout					65.00%

==== By county ====
County	Barack Obama Democratic		Mitt Romney Republican		Various candidates Other parties		Margin		Total votes cast
County	#	%	#	%	#	%	#	%	Total votes cast
Kent	35,527	51.73%	32,135	46.79%	1,018	1.48%	3,392	4.94%	68,680
New Castle	167,082	66.30%	81,230	32.23%	3,700	1.47%	85,852	34.07%	252,012
Sussex	39,975	42.88%	52,119	55.90%	1,135	1.22%	-12,144	-13.02%	93,229
Totals	242,584	58.61%	165,484	39.98%	5,853	1.41%	77,100	18.63%	413,921

==== By congressional district ====
Due to the state's low population, only one congressional district is allocated. This district is called the at-large district, because it covers the entire state, and thus is equivalent to the statewide election results.

District	Romney	Obama	Representative
At-large	39.98%	58.61%	John Carney

== See also ==
- United States presidential elections in Delaware
- 2012 Republican Party presidential debates and forums
- 2012 Republican Party presidential primaries
- Results of the 2012 Republican Party presidential primaries
- Delaware Republican Party
