= 2024 United States presidential election in Delaware =

- November 5, 2024
- Turnout: 65.74% (▼3.12 pp)

Nominee	Kamala Harris	Donald Trump
Party	Democratic	Republican
Home state	California	Florida
Running mate	Tim Walz	JD Vance
Electoral vote	3	0
Popular vote	289,758	214,351
Percentage	56.49%	41.79%

Harris
40–50%
50–60%
60–70%
70–80%
80–90%
90–100%
Trump
40–50%
50–60%
60–70%
70–80%
80–90%
No data
President before election
Joe Biden
Democratic
Elected President
Donald Trump
Republican

The 2024 United States presidential election in Delaware took place on Tuesday, November 5, 2024, as part of the 2024 United States elections in which all 50 states plus the District of Columbia participated. Delaware voters chose electors to represent them in the Electoral College via a popular vote. The state of Delaware has 3 electoral votes in the Electoral College, following reapportionment due to the 2020 United States census in which the state neither gained nor lost a seat.

Delaware is the home state of the incumbent President Joe Biden, and has not voted for a Republican presidential candidate since 1988. It is a strongly blue state on the East Coast with the majority of the population being concentrated in the urban northern part of the state, despite the southern portion being rural and having some Southern cultural influence.

Harris carried Delaware by 14.7%, a decrease from Biden's 19% margin in 2020. This compares to Harris significantly underperforming in many other blue states. Harris carried Kent County, a bellwether county, despite losing the election, which last occurred in 1992. Trump is the first Republican to win the presidency without the county since 1924.

== Primary elections ==
=== Republican primary ===
The Delaware Republican primary was scheduled to be held on April 2, 2024, alongside primaries in Pennsylvania and Rhode Island. As all other primary candidates besides Donald Trump withdrew their names from the ballot, the primary was cancelled on March 19, giving Trump all 16 pledged delegates.

==== Winner of delegates ====
- Donald Trump

==== Endorsements ====
Donald Trump

Notable individual

- Lauren Witzke, far-right political activist and nominee for U.S. Senator in 2020

=== Democratic primary ===
The Delaware Democratic primary was originally scheduled to be held on April 2, 2024, alongside primaries in Connecticut, New York, Rhode Island, and Wisconsin. In Delaware, candidates can make the primary ballot by submitting at least 500 valid signatures by the filing deadline of February 2, 2024. Incumbent president Joe Biden was the only one who met the requirements to make the ballot. Pursuant to Delaware state law, this means that the primary was cancelled, with the delegates awarded to Biden.

Delaware sent 34 delegates, 19 pledged and 15 superdelegates, to the 2024 Democratic National Convention.

==== Winner of delegates ====
- Vice-President Kamala Harris (previously pledged to President Joe Biden)

==== Endorsements ====
Joe Biden (withdrawn)

U.S. Senators

- Tom Carper, (Note: Biden-Harris Campaign National Advisory Board member) Delaware (2001–2025), 71st Governor of Delaware (1993–2001), U.S. Representative for DE-AL (1983–1993)
- Chris Coons, (Note: Biden campaign national co-chair) Delaware (2010–present)

U.S. Representatives

- Lisa Blunt Rochester, DE-AL (2017–2025), candidate for U.S. Senator from Delaware in 2024

Governors

- John Carney, Governor of Delaware (2017–2025); U.S. Representative for DE-AL (2011–2017); Lieutenant Governor of Delaware (2001–2009)

== General election ==
=== Candidate ballot access ===
The following candidates have qualified for presidential ballot access in Delaware:

Nominated parties

- Democratic – Kamala Harris / Tim Walz
- Republican – Donald Trump / JD Vance
- Independent Party – Robert F. Kennedy Jr., Nicole Shanahan

Other qualified parties

- Libertarian – Chase Oliver / Mike ter Maat
- No Labels (did not nominate a candidate)

=== Predictions ===
Source	Ranking	As of
Cook Political Report	Solid D	December 19, 2023
Inside Elections	Solid D	April 26, 2023
Sabato's Crystal Ball	Safe D	June 29, 2023
Decision Desk HQ/The Hill	Safe D	December 14, 2023
CNalysis	Solid D	December 30, 2023
CNN	Solid D	January 14, 2024
The Economist	Safe D	October 1, 2024
538	Solid D	September 15, 2024
RCP	Solid D	June 26, 2024
NBC News	Safe D	October 6, 2024

=== Polling ===
Kamala Harris vs. Donald Trump

Poll source	Date(s) administered	Sample size (Note: Key: A – all adults RV – registered voters LV – likely voters V – unclear)	Margin of error	Kamala Harris Democratic	Donald Trump Republican	Other / Undecided
Slingshot Strategies (D) (Note: Poll sponsored by Citizens for Judicial Fairness)	September 19–21, 2024	500 (RV)	± 4.4%	54%	37%	9%

Kamala Harris vs. Donald Trump vs. Robert F. Kennedy Jr. vs. Cornel West vs. Jill Stein vs. Chase Oliver

Poll source	Date(s) administered	Sample size	Margin of error	Kamala Harris Democratic	Donald Trump Republican	Robert F. Kennedy Jr. Independent	Cornel West Independent	Jill Stein Green	Chase Oliver Libertarian	Other / Undecided
University of Delaware	September 11–19, 2024	383 (LV)	± 5.8%	56%	36%	3%	–	–	1%	4%

Hypothetical polling with Joe Biden and Donald Trump

Joe Biden vs. Donald Trump

Poll source	Date(s) administered	Sample size	Margin of error	Joe Biden Democratic	Donald Trump Republican	Other / Undecided
	July 21, 2024	Joe Biden withdraws from the race.				
John Zogby Strategies (Note: Poll conducted for Kennedy's campaign)	April 13–21, 2024	310 (LV)	–	51%	40%	9%

Hypothetical polling with other candidates

Joe Biden vs. Robert F. Kennedy Jr.

Poll source	Date(s) administered	Sample size	Margin of error	Joe Biden Democratic	Robert Kennedy Jr Independent	Other / Undecided
	July 21, 2024	Joe Biden withdraws from the race.				
John Zogby Strategies	April 13–21, 2024	310 (LV)	–	46%	42%	12%

Robert F. Kennedy Jr. vs. Donald Trump

Poll source	Date(s) administered	Sample size	Margin of error	Robert F. Kennedy Jr. Independent	Donald Trump Republican	Other / Undecided
	August 23, 2024	Robert F. Kennedy, Jr. suspends his presidential campaign and endorses Donald Trump.				
John Zogby Strategies	April 13–21, 2024	310 (LV)	–	42%	36%	22%

=== Results ===
2024 United States presidential election in Delaware
Party	Candidate	Votes	%	±%
Democratic	Kamala Harris; Tim Walz	289,758	56.49%	▼2.25%
Republican	Donald Trump; JD Vance	214,351	41.79%	▲2.02%
Independent Party	Robert F. Kennedy Jr. (withdrawn); Nicole Shanahan (withdrawn)	4,636	0.90%	N/A
Libertarian	Chase Oliver; Mike ter Maat	2,038	0.40%	▼0.59%
Green	Jill Stein (write-in); Butch Ware (write-in)	914	0.18%	▼0.24%
Conservative	Vermin Supreme; Jonathan Realz	914	0.18%	N/A
American Solidarity	Peter Sonski (write-in); Lauren Onak (write-in)	98	0.02%	Steady
Independent	Cornel West (write-in); Melina Abdullah (write-in)	96	0.02%	N/A
Socialism and Liberation	Claudia De la Cruz (write-in); Karina Garcia (write-in)	87	0.02%	▲0.02%
Independent	Shiva Ayyadurai (write-in); Crystal Ellis (write-in)	4	0.00%	N/A
Write-in		16	0.00%	N/A
Total votes		512,912	100.00%	
Democratic win				

==== By county ====
County	Kamala Harris Democratic		Donald Trump Republican		Various candidates Other parties		Margin		Total
County	#	%	#	%	#	%	#	%	Total
Kent	44,222	50.09%	42,458	48.09%	1,609	1.82%	1,764	2.00%	88,289
New Castle	180,700	65.27%	90,868	32.82%	5,291	1.91%	89,832	32.45%	276,859
Sussex	64,836	43.88%	81,025	54.83%	1,903	1.29%	-16,189	-10.95%	147,764
Totals	289,758	56.49%	214,351	41.79%	8,803	1.72%	75,407	14.70%	512,912

==== By congressional district ====
Due to the state's low population, only one congressional district is allocated. This district is called the at-large district, because it covers the entire state, and thus is equivalent to the statewide election results.

District	Trump	Harris	Representative
At-large	41.79%	56.49%	Sarah McBride

== See also ==
- United States presidential elections in Delaware
- 2024 United States presidential election
- 2024 Democratic Party presidential primaries
- 2024 Republican Party presidential primaries
- 2024 United States elections

== Notes ==
Partisan clients
