= 1988 United States presidential election in Delaware =

- November 8, 1988

Nominee	George H. W. Bush	Michael Dukakis
Party	Republican	Democratic
Home state	Texas	Massachusetts
Running mate	Dan Quayle	Lloyd Bentsen
Electoral vote	3	0
Popular vote	139,639	108,647
Percentage	55.88%	43.48%

Bush
50–60%
60–70%
Dukakis
50–60%
60–70%
80–90%
President before election
Ronald Reagan
Republican
Elected President
George H. W. Bush
Republican

The 1988 United States presidential election in Delaware took place on November 8, 1988, as part of the 1988 United States presidential election in which all 50 states plus the District of Columbia participated. State voters chose three electors to represent them in the Electoral College, which selected the president and vice president, via a popular vote pitting incumbent Republican Vice President George H.W. Bush and his running mate, U.S. Senator from Indiana Dan Quayle, against Democratic challenger Massachusetts Governor Michael Dukakis and his running mate, U.S. Senator from Texas Lloyd Bentsen.

Also on the ballot were Libertarian Party nominee, U.S. Representative from Texas Ron Paul and his running mate Alaska State Representative Andre Marrou. The left-wing New Alliance Party nominated activist and psychologist Lenora Fulani and her running mate, life coach Joyce Dattner.

Vice President Bush won Delaware by 12.4%, making the Blue Hen state about 4.7% more Republican than the nation—a substantial shift compared to 1984, when Delaware was only about 1% more Republican than the nation. Like Reagan, Bush performed strongly in Delaware's two southernmost counties, Sussex and Kent, both of which gave him over 60% of the vote. However, he carried Delaware's northernmost and by far most populous county, New Castle County, by 7.8%, almost exactly the same as his national margin of victory (whereas Reagan had carried it in 1984 by a few points less than his national margin).

In 1988, Delaware was a bellwether state, due to the strong contrast between the industrial city of Wilmington in the north of the state and rural poultry farms in the south. 1988 was the eleventh election in a row in which Delaware voted for the national winner. However, despite New Castle County trending Republican in 1988, it would become powerfully and reliably Democratic from 1992 on, making Delaware part of the Blue Wall. As of 2024, this remains the last election in which either New Castle County or the state of Delaware has voted for the Republican nominee.

The presidential election of 1988 was a very partisan election for Delaware, with nearly 99.5% of the electorate voting for either the Democratic or Republican parties, and only 4 political parties on the ballot, statewide.

== Results ==
1988 United States presidential election in Delaware
Party	Candidate	Votes	%
Republican	George H. W. Bush	139,639	55.88%
Democratic	Michael Dukakis	108,647	43.48%
Libertarian	Ron Paul	1,162	0.47%
New Alliance	Lenora Fulani	443	0.18%
Total votes		249,891	100.00%

=== By county ===
County	George H. W. Bush Republican		Michael Dukakis Democratic		Various candidates Other parties		Margin		Total votes cast
County	#	%	#	%	#	%	#	%	Total votes cast
Kent	19,923	60.17%	12,996	39.25%	194	0.58%	6,927	20.92%	33,113
New Castle	92,587	53.52%	79,147	45.75%	1,269	0.73%	13,440	7.77%	173,003
Sussex	27,129	61.97%	16,504	37.70%	142	0.33%	10,625	24.27%	43,775
Totals	139,639	55.88%	108,647	43.48%	1,605	0.64%	30,992	12.40%	249,891

== See also ==
- United States presidential elections in Delaware
- Presidency of George H. W. Bush
