= 1992 United States presidential election in Delaware =

- November 3, 1992

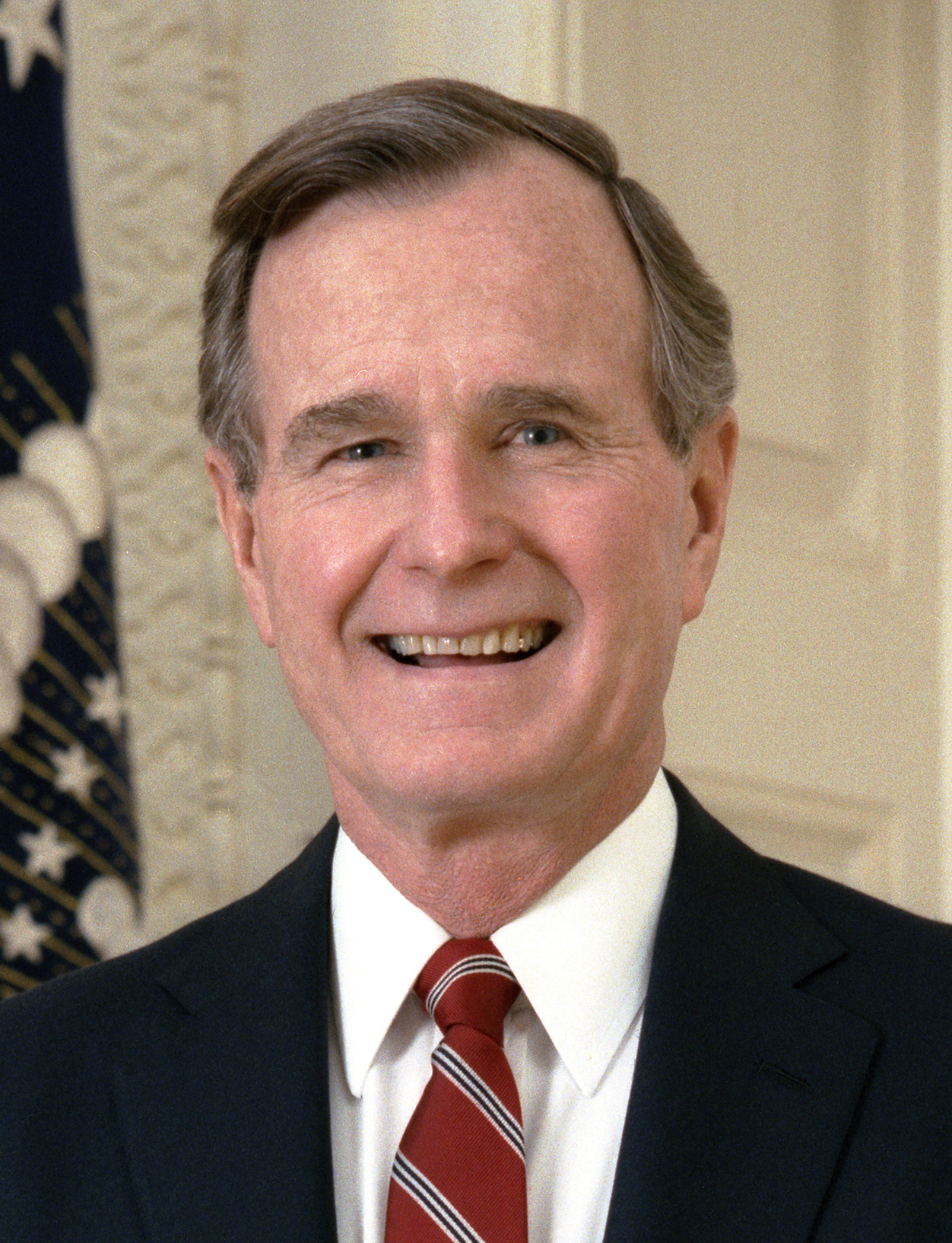

Nominee	Bill Clinton	George H. W. Bush	Ross Perot
Party	Democratic	Republican	Independent
Home state	Arkansas	Texas	Texas
Running mate	Al Gore	Dan Quayle	James Stockdale
Electoral vote	3	0	0
Popular vote	126,054	102,313	59,213
Percentage	43.51%	35.31%	20.44%

Clinton
30–40%
40–50%
50–60%
60–70%
80–90%
Bush
30–40%
40–50%
50–60%
President before election
George H. W. Bush
Republican
Elected President
Bill Clinton
Democratic

The 1992 United States presidential election in Delaware took place on November 3, 1992, as part of the 1992 United States presidential election. Voters chose three representatives, or electors, to the Electoral College, who voted for president and vice president.

Delaware was won by Governor Bill Clinton (D-Arkansas) with 43.52%% of the popular vote over incumbent President George H. W. Bush (R-Texas) with 35.33%. Businessman Ross Perot (I-Texas) finished third, with 20.45% of the popular vote. Clinton ultimately won the national vote, defeating incumbent President Bush. Clinton comfortably won Delaware by a margin of 8.19%. This was the last election in which Delaware was a swing state, with the margin within 3% of the national vote. In 1996, the state would shift to the left, becoming a Democratic stronghold.

== Results ==
1992 United States presidential election in Delaware
Party	Candidate	Votes	%
Democratic	Bill Clinton	126,054	43.51%
Republican	George H. W. Bush (inc.)	102,313	35.31%
Independent	Ross Perot	59,213	20.44%
New Alliance	Lenora Fulani	1,105	0.38%
Libertarian	Andre Marrou	935	0.32%
Write-in	Bo Gritz	9	0.00%
Write-in	Lyndon LaRouche	9	0.00%
Write-in	John Hagelin	6	0.00%
Write-in	James Warren	3	0.00%
Write-in	Howard Phillips	2	0.00%
Write-in	All Others	86	0.00%
Total votes		289,735	100.00%

=== By county ===
County	Bill Clinton Democratic		George H. W. Bush Republican		Ross Perot Independent		All Others Various		Margin		Total votes cast
County	#	%	#	%	#	%	#	%	#	%	Total votes cast
Kent	15,634	38.17%	15,562	38.66%	8,916	22.15%	413	1.03%	-198	-0.49%	40,255
New Castle	91,516	46.48%	66,311	33.68%	37,581	19.09%	1,496	0.76%	25,205	12.80%	196,904
Sussex	19,174	36.47%	20,440	38.88%	12,716	24.19%	246	0.47%	-1,266	-2.41%	52,576
Totals	126,054	43.51%	102,313	35.31%	59,213	20.44%	2,155	0.74%	23,741	8.19%	289,735

==== Counties that flipped from Republican to Democratic ====
- New Castle

== See also ==
- United States presidential elections in Delaware
