= Nationwide opinion polling for the 2016 United States presidential election =

This page lists nationwide public opinion polls that were conducted relating to the 2016 United States presidential election. The two major party candidates were chosen at the Democratic National Convention and Republican National Convention in July 2016.

Donald Trump won the general election of Tuesday, November 8, 2016. He lost the popular vote but won the electoral college. Most polls correctly predicted a popular vote victory for Hillary Clinton, but overestimated the size of her lead, with the result that Trump's electoral college victory was a surprise to analysts. Retrospective analyses differ as to why the polls and commentators interpreting them were unable to correctly forecast the result of the election. Two daily tracking polls, the UPI/CVoter poll and the University of Southern California/Los Angeles Times poll were the only polls that often incorrectly predicted a Trump popular vote victory or showed a nearly tied election.

== Aggregate polls ==
Poll numbers verified as of November 8, 2016.

Race	Poll model	Hillary Clinton Democratic	Donald Trump Republican	Gary Johnson Libertarian	Jill Stein Green	Leading by (points)
Two-way	270toWin	47.2%	43.6%	—N/a		3.6
Two-way	BBC	48.0%	44.0%	—N/a		4.0
Two-way	HuffPost Pollster	47.3%	42.0%	—N/a		5.3
Two-way	New York Times	45.9%	42.8%	—N/a		3.1
Two-way	Real Clear Politics	46.8%	43.6%	—N/a		3.2
Two-way	TPM Polltracker	48.8%	43.9%	—N/a		4.9
Three-way	FiveThirtyEight	45.7%	41.8%	4.8%	—N/a	3.9
Three-way	HuffPost Pollster	45.7%	40.8%	5.0%	—N/a	4.9
Three-way	New York Times	45.4%	42.3%	5.0%	—N/a	3.1
Three-way	TPM Polltracker	46.0%	44.1%	4.9%	—N/a	1.9
Four-way	270toWin	45.6%	42.5%	4.8%	2.1%	3.1
Four-way	Real Clear Politics	45.5%	42.2%	4.7%	1.9%	3.3
Four-way	CNN Poll of Polls	46.0%	42.0%	5.0%	2.0%	4.0
Four-way	TPM Polltracker	46.6%	43.8%	4.6%	2.7%	2.8
Election results (popular vote)		48.2%	46.1%	3.3%	1.1%	2.1

== Individual polls ==
=== Two-way race ===
==== After convention nominations ====
Poll source	Date	Hillary Clinton Democratic	Donald Trump Republican	Leading by (points)	Sample size	Margin of error
UPI/CVoter	November 1–7, 2016	49%	46%	3	1,728	± 3.0%
YouGov/The Economist	November 4–7, 2016	49%	45%	4	3,677	± 1.7%
Bloomberg News/Selzer	November 4–6, 2016	46%	43%	3	799	± 3.5%
ABC News/Washington Post	November 3–6, 2016	49%	46%	3	2,220	± 2.5%
Fox News	November 3–6, 2016	48%	44%	4	1,295	± 2.5%
IBD/TIPP	November 3–6, 2016	43%	42%	1	1,026	± 3.1%
Monmouth University	November 3–6, 2016	50%	44%	6	802	± 3.6%
Ipsos/Reuters	November 2–6, 2016	44%	39%	5	2,195	± 2.4%
CBS News/New York Times	November 2–6, 2016	47%	43%	4	1,426	± 3.0%
NBC News/SurveyMonkey	October 31 – November 6, 2016	51%	44%	7	70,194	± 1.0%
CCES/YouGov	October 4 – November 6, 2016	43%	39%	4	84,292	±%
NBC News/Wall Street Journal	November 3–5, 2016	48%	43%	5	1,282	± 2.73%
ABC News/Washington Post	November 2–5, 2016	49%	45%	4	1,937	± 2.5%
IBD/TIPP	November 2–5, 2016	45%	44%	1	903	± 3.3%
UPI/CVoter	October 30 – November 5, 2016	49%	46%	3	1,572	± 3.0%
USC/Los Angeles Times	October 30 – November 5, 2016	43%	48%	5	2,988	± 4.5%
ABC News/Washington Post	November 1–4, 2016	49%	44%	5	1,685	± 2.5%
IBD/TIPP	November 1–4, 2016	46%	43%	3	804	± 3.5%
Ipsos/Reuters	October 31 – November 4, 2016	44%	40%	4	2,244	± 2.4%
UPI/CVoter	October 29 – November 4, 2016	49%	48%	1	1,497	± 3.0%
USC/Los Angeles Times	October 29 – November 4, 2016	43%	48%	5	2,987	± 4.5%
Fox News	November 1–3, 2016	46%	45%	1	1,107	± 3.0%
McClatchy/Marist	November 1–3, 2016	46%	44%	2	940	± 3.2%
Ipsos/Reuters	October 30 – November 3, 2016	44%	39%	5	2,021	± 2.6%
ABC News/Washington Post	October 31 – November 3, 2016	49%	45%	4	1,419	± 3.0%
IBD/TIPP	October 30 – November 3, 2016	45%	44%	1	898	± 3.3%
UPI/CVoter	October 28 – November 3, 2016	49%	48%	1	1,395	± 3.0%
ABC News/Washington Post	October 30 – November 2, 2016	49%	46%	3	1,151	± 3.0%
Ipsos/Reuters	October 29 – November 2, 2016	45%	39%	6	1,858	± 2.6%
IBD/TIPP	October 29 – November 2, 2016	44%	44%	Tied	867	± 3.4%
UPI/CVoter	October 27 – November 2, 2016	49%	48%	1	1,329	± 3.0%
ABC News/Washington Post	October 29 – November 1, 2016	49%	47%	2	1,167	± 3.0%
CBS News/New York Times	October 28 – November 1, 2016	47%	44%	3	1,333	± 3.0%
Ipsos/Reuters	October 28 – November 1, 2016	45%	39%	6	1,772	± 3.0%
YouGov/The Economist	October 30 – November 1, 2016	48%	45%	3	1,233	± 3.2%
IBD/TIPP	October 27 – November 1, 2016	44%	44%	Tied	862	± 3.4%
UPI/CVoter	October 26 – November 1, 2016	49%	48%	1	1,383	±3.0%
USC/Los Angeles Times	October 26 – November 1, 2016	42%	48%	6	3,004	± 4.5%
ABC News/Washington Post	October 28–31, 2016	48%	47%	1	1,182	± 3.0%
IBD/TIPP	October 26–31, 2016	45%	44%	1	1,018	± 3.2%
Politico/Morning Consult	October 29–30, 2016	46%	43%	3	1,772	± 2.0%
Politico/Morning Consult	October 27–30, 2016	52%	47%	5	2,075	± 3.0%
ABC News/Washington Post	October 27–30, 2016	48%	47%	1	1,167	± 3.0%
Ipsos/Reuters	October 26–30, 2016	44%	39%	5	1,264	± 3.0%
IBD/TIPP	October 25–30, 2016	45%	43%	2	993	± 3.2%
UPI/CVoter	October 24–30, 2016	49%	48%	1	1,299	±3.0%
NBC News/SurveyMonkey	October 24–30, 2016	51%	44%	7	40,816	± 1.0%
ABC News/Washington Post	October 26–29, 2016	49%	47%	2	1,165	± 3.0%
IBD/TIPP	October 24–29, 2016	45%	41%	4	1,039	± 3.3%
UPI/CVoter	October 23–29, 2016	48%	48%	Tied	1,317	± 3.0%
Morning Consult	October 27–28, 2016	46%	41%	5	1,794	± 2.0%
ABC News/Washington Post	October 25–28, 2016	46%	45%	1	1,160	± 3.0%
IBD/TIPP	October 23–28, 2016	46%	41%	5	1,013	± 3.3%
ABC News/Washington Post	October 24–27, 2016	49%	46%	3	1,148	± 3.0%
IBD/TIPP	October 22–27, 2016	45%	42%	3	973	± 3.3%
Ipsos/Reuters	October 21–27, 2016	42%	36%	6	1,627	± 3.0%
USC/Los Angeles Times	October 21–27, 2016	44%	46%	2	3,248	± 4.5%
ABC News/Washington Post	October 23–26, 2016	50%	45%	5	1,150	± 3.0%
YouGov/The Economist	October 22–26, 2016	49%	46%	3	1,376	± 3.1%
IBD/TIPP	October 21–26, 2016	44%	42%	2	945	± 3.3%
UPI/CVoter	October 20–26, 2016	49%	47%	2	1,363	± 3.0%
Fox News	October 22–25, 2016	49%	44%	5	1,221	± 2.5%
ABC News/Washington Post	October 22–25, 2016	51%	44%	7	1,135	± 3.0%
Pew Research Center	October 20–25, 2016	50%	43%	7	2,120	± 2.4%
IBD/TIPP	October 20–25, 2016	43%	41%	2	921	± 3.3%
UPI/CVoter	October 19–25, 2016	49%	47%	2	1,349	± 3.0%
USC/Los Angeles Times	October 19–25, 2016	44%	45%	1	3,145	± 4.5%
CNBC	October 21–24, 2016	47%	37%	10	804	± 3.5%
ABC News	October 21–24, 2016	51%	43%	8	1,119	± 3.0%
Greenberg Quinlan Rosner	October 21–24, 2016	53%	41%	12	900	± 3.27%
Associated Press/GFK	October 20–24, 2016	54%	41%	13	1,546	± 2.75%
USA Today/Suffolk University	October 20–24, 2016	49%	39%	10	1,000	± 3.0%
Ipsos/Reuters	October 20–24, 2016	43%	37%	6	1,170	± 3.3%
IBD/TIPP	October 19–24, 2016	43%	42%	1	873	± 3.6%
ABC News	October 20–23, 2016	53%	41%	12	1,155	± 3.0%
CNN/ORC	October 20–23, 2016	51%	45%	6	779	± 3.5%
IBD/TIPP	October 18–23, 2016	42%	42%	Tied	815	± 3.6%
NBC News/SurveyMonkey	October 17–23, 2016	50%	44%	6	32,225	± 1.0%
UPI/CVoter	October 17–23, 2016	49%	46%	3	1,414	± 3.0%
ABC News	October 20–22, 2016	53%	41%	12	874	± 3.5%
IBD/TIPP	October 17–22, 2016	42%	43%	1	783	± 3.6%
IBD/TIPP	October 16–21, 2016	42%	42%	Tied	791	± 3.6%
Politico/Morning Consult	October 19–20, 2016	46%	40%	6	1,395	± 3.0%
American Research Group	October 17–20, 2016	49%	42%	7	1,006	± 3.0%
IBD/TIPP	October 15–20, 2016	43%	41%	2	789	± 3.6%
USC/Los Angeles Times	October 14–20, 2016	44%	45%	1	3,001	± 4.5%
Ipsos/Reuters	October 14–20, 2016	44%	40%	4	1,640	± 3.0%
IBD/TIPP	October 14–19, 2016	43%	41%	2	779	± 3.6%
Quinnipiac University	October 17–18, 2016	50%	44%	6	1,007	± 3.1%
YouGov/The Economist	October 15–18, 2016	47%	43%	4	1,300	± 4.0%
IBD/TIPP	October 13–18, 2016	44%	41%	3	782	± 3.6%
Fox News	October 15–17, 2016	49%	42%	7	912	± 3.0%
Bloomberg Politics	October 14–17, 2016	50%	41%	9	1,006	± 3.1%
Ipsos/Reuters	October 13–17, 2016	43%	39%	4	1,190	± 3.2%
Public Religion Research Institute/The Atlantic	October 12–17, 2016	51%	36%	15	692	±4.4%
UPI/CVoter	October 11–17, 2016	51%	46%	5	1,326	± 3.0%
Monmouth University	October 14–16, 2016	53%	41%	12	805	± 3.5%
CBS News	October 12–16, 2016	51%	40%	11	1,411	± 3.0%
NBC News/SurveyMonkey	October 10–16, 2016	51%	43%	8	24,804	± 1.0%
UPI/CVoter	October 10–16, 2016	50%	46%	4	1,325	± 3.0%
Politico/Morning Consult	October 13–15, 2016	46%	41%	5	1,737	± 2.0%
NBC News/Wall Street Journal	October 10–13, 2016	51%	41%	10	905	±3.3%
ABC News/Washington Post	October 10–13, 2016	50%	46%	4	740	±4.0%
Franklin Pierce University/Boston Herald	October 9–13, 2016	46%	41%	5	1,001	±3.1%
George Washington University	October 8–13, 2016	47%	39%	8	1,000	± 3.1%
UPI/CVoter	October 7–13, 2016	50%	45%	5	1,482	± 3.0%
Fox News	October 10–12, 2016	49%	41%	8	917	± 3.0%
Politico/Morning Consult	October 10, 2016	46%	41%	5	1,757	± 3.0%
NBC News/Wall Street Journal	October 8–10, 2016	50%	40%	10	900	± 3.5%
Ipsos/Reuters	October 6–10, 2016	44%	37%	7	2,363	± 2.3%
UPI/CVoter	October 4–10, 2016	50%	44%	6	1,367	± 3.0%
Pew Research Center	September 27 – October 10, 2016	53%	44%	9	3,616	± 2.9%
NBC News/Wall Street Journal	October 8–9, 2016	52%	38%	14	422	± 4.6%
NBC News/SurveyMonkey	October 3–9, 2016	51%	44%	7	23,329	± 1.0%
UPI/CVoter	October 3–9, 2016	49%	44%	5	1,801	± 3.0%
Politico/Morning Consult	October 8, 2016	45%	41%	4	1,390	± 3.0%
YouGov/The Economist	October 7–8, 2016	48%	43%	5	1,300	± 4.2%
Morning Consult	October 5–6, 2016	44%	42%	2	1,775	± 2.0%
Quinnipiac University	October 5–6, 2016	50%	44%	6	1,064	± 3.0%
Fox News	October 3–6, 2016	48%	44%	4	896	± 3.0%
Ipsos/Reuters	September 30 – October 6, 2016	43%	38%	5	1,695	± 3.0%
UPI/CVoter	September 30 – October 6, 2016	48%	47%	1	1,774	± 3.0%
UPI/CVoter	September 28 – October 4, 2016	47%	48%	1	1,274	± 3.0%
USC/Los Angeles Times	September 28 – October 4, 2016	43%	47%	4	2,369	± 4.5%
YouGov/The Economist	October 1–3, 2016	48%	43%	5	911	± 3.9%
Ipsos/Reuters	September 29 – October 3, 2016	44%	37%	7	1,928	± 2.5%
Politico/Morning Consult	September 30 – October 2, 2016	46%	39%	7	1,778	± 2.0%
Farleigh Dickinson/SSRS	September 28 – October 2, 2016	50%	40%	10	788	± 4.4%
CBS News/New York Times	September 28 – October 2, 2016	49%	43%	6	1,501	± 3.0%
CNN/ORC	September 28 – October 2, 2016	47%	42%	5	1,501	± 2.5%
NBC News/SurveyMonkey	September 26 – October 2, 2016	50%	44%	6	26,925	± 1.0%
UPI/CVoter	September 26 – October 2, 2016	47%	49%	2	1,285	± 3.0%
USC/Los Angeles Times	September 24–30, 2016	42%	47%	5	2,526	± 4.5%
Fox News	September 27–29, 2016	49%	44%	5	911	± 3.0%
Ipsos/Reuters	September 23–29, 2016	43%	38%	5	2,501	± 2.0%
UPI/CVoter	September 23–29, 2016	47%	49%	2	1,236	± 3.0%
Public Policy Polling	September 27–28, 2016	49%	45%	4	993	± 3.2%
Ipsos/Reuters	September 27–28, 2016	42%	38%	4	1,336	± 3.1%
Echelon Insights	September 26–27, 2016	47%	42%	5	1,833	±%
Morning Consult	September 26–27, 2016	45%	41%	4	1,253	± 3.0%
UPI/CVoter	September 21–27, 2016	48%	48%	Tied	1,239	± 3.0%
Ipsos/Reuters	September 22–26, 2016	44%	38%	6	1,041	± 3.5%
Quinnipiac University	September 22–25, 2016	47%	46%	1	1,115	± 2.9%
Monmouth University	September 22–25, 2016	49%	46%	3	729	± 3.6%
NBC News/SurveyMonkey	September 19–25, 2016	51%	44%	7	13,598	± 1.1%
USC/Los Angeles Times	September 19–25, 2016	42%	46%	4	2,726	± 4.5%
UPI/CVoter	September 19–25, 2016	48%	47%	1	1,052	± 3.0%
Morning Consult	September 22–24, 2016	44%	42%	2	1,712	± 2.0%
Bloomberg/Selzer	September 21–24, 2016	46%	46%	Tied	1,002	± 3.1%
ABC News/Washington Post	September 19–22, 2016	49%	47%	2	651	± 4.5%
Ipsos/Reuters	September 16–22, 2016	41%	37%	4	1,559	± 3.0%
USC/Los Angeles Times	September 15–21, 2016	43%	45%	2	2,623	± 2.3%
American Research Group	September 17–20, 2016	47%	44%	3	990	± 3.2%
McClatchy/Marist	September 15–20, 2016	48%	41%	7	758	± 3.6%
USC/Los Angeles Times	September 14–20, 2016	42%	46%	4	2,629	± 2.3%
YouGov/Economist	September 18–19, 2016	45%	44%	1	936	± 4.0%
NBC News/Wall Street Journal	September 16–19, 2016	48%	41%	7	922	± 3.23%
Ipsos/Reuters	September 15–19, 2016	39%	39%	Tied	1,111	± 3.4%
Associated Press/GFK	September 15–19, 2016	50%	44%	6	1,251	± 2.5%
USC/Los Angeles Times	September 13–19, 2016	42%	47%	5	2,524	± 2.2%
UPI/CVoter	September 12–18, 2016	48%	47%	1	1,203	± 3.0%
NBC News/SurveyMonkey	September 12–18, 2016	50%	45%	5	13,230	± 1.2%
UPI/CVoter	September 10–16, 2016	47%	47%	Tied	1,246	± 3.0%
UPI/CVoter	September 9–15, 2016	47%	48%	1	1,229	± 3.0%
Ipsos/Reuters	September 9–15, 2016	42%	38%	4	1,579	± 3.0%
USC/Los Angeles Times	September 9–15, 2016	41%	47%	6	2,497	± 2.8%
Fox News	September 11–14, 2016	45%	46%	1	867	± 3.0%
UPI/CVoter	September 8–14, 2016	47%	48%	1	1,265	± 3.0%
USC/Los Angeles Times	September 8–14, 2016	41%	47%	6	2,499	± 3.1%
YouGov/Economist	September 10–13, 2016	46%	44%	2	1,087	± 4.0%
CBS News/New York Times	September 9–13, 2016	46%	44%	2	1,433	± 3%
Quinnipiac University	September 8–13, 2016	48%	43%	5	960	± 3.2%
UPI/CVoter	September 7–13, 2016	47%	48%	1	1,245	± 3.0%
USC/Los Angeles Times	September 7–13, 2016	42%	47%	5	2,550	± 2.7%
Ipsos/Reuters	September 8–12, 2016	40%	39%	1	1,127	± 3.3%
UPI/CVoter	September 6–12, 2016	46%	49%	3	1,232	± 3.0%
Pew Research	August 16 – September 12, 2016	52%	44%	8	3,941	± 2.6%
NBC News/SurveyMonkey	September 5–11, 2016	48%	44%	4	16,220	± 1.1%
UPI/CVoter	September 5–11, 2016	46%	49%	3	1,260	± 3.0%
Morning Consult	September 6–8, 2016	44%	43%	1	1,710	± 2.0%
ABC News/Washington Post	September 5–8, 2016	51%	43%	8	642	± 4.5%
USC/Los Angeles Times	September 2–8, 2016	45%	44%	1	2,653	± 2.4%
UPI/CVoter	September 2–8, 2016	46%	48%	2	1,256	± 3.0%
UPI/CVoter	September 1–7, 2016	47%	48%	1	1,226	± 3.0%
YouGov/Economist	September 4–6, 2016	44%	42%	2	1,077	± 4.7%
UPI/CVoter	August 31 – September 6, 2016	47%	47%	Tied	1,262	± 3.0%
Ipsos/Reuters	September 1–5, 2016	40%	38%	2	1,084	± 3.5%
UPI/CVoter	August 30 – September 5, 2016	48%	46%	2	1,220	± 3.0%
CNN/ORC	September 1–4, 2016	48%	49%	1	786	± 3.5%
NBC News/SurveyMonkey	August 29 – September 4, 2016	48%	42%	6	32,226	± 1.0%
UPI/CVoter	August 29 – September 4, 2016	49%	47%	2	1,237	± 3.0%
UPI/CVoter	August 28 – September 3, 2016	49%	46%	3	1,242	± 3.0%
Morning Consult	September 1–2, 2016	42%	40%	2	2,001	± 2%
Ipsos/Reuters	August 26 – September 1, 2016	39%	40%	1	1,804	± 3.0%
IBD/TIPP	August 26 – September 1, 2016	44%	43%	1	861	± 3.4%
Fox News	August 28–30, 2016	48%	42%	6	1,011	± 3.0%
UPI/CVoter	August 24–30, 2016	49%	46%	3	1,162	± 3.0%
Ipsos/Reuters	August 25–29, 2016	40%	39%	1	1,404	± 3.0%
Suffolk University/USA Today	August 24–29, 2016	48%	41%	7	1,000	± 3.0%
UPI/CVoter	August 23–29, 2016	50%	47%	3	1,173	± 3.0%
USC/Los Angeles Times	August 23–29, 2016	42%	45%	3	2,500	± 2.5%
Public Policy Polling	August 26–28, 2016	48%	43%	5	881	± 3.3%
Monmouth University	August 25–28, 2016	49%	42%	7	689	± 3.5%
NBC News/SurveyMonkey	August 22–28, 2016	48%	42%	6	24,104	± 1.0%
UPI/CVoter	August 22–28, 2016	50%	47%	3	1,145	± 3.0%
UPI/CVoter	August 21–27, 2016	50%	47%	3	1,682	± 3.0%
Morning Consult	August 24–26, 2016	43%	40%	3	2,007	± 2%
Ipsos/Reuters	August 22–25, 2016	41%	36%	5	1,154	± 3%
Ipsos/Reuters	August 20–24, 2016	42%	35%	7	1,049	± 2.9%
UPI/CVoter	August 18–24, 2016	48%	49%	1	1,720	± 3.0%
Quinnipiac University	August 18–24, 2016	51%	41%	10	1,496	± 2.5%
USC/Los Angeles Times	August 18–24, 2016	44%	44%	Tied	2,434	± 2.3%
YouGov/Economist	August 19–23, 2016	47%	44%	3	1,080	± 4.1%
UPI/CVoter	August 17–23, 2016	48%	48%	Tied	1,737	± 3.0%
Ipsos/Reuters	August 18–22, 2016	45%	33%	12	1,115	± 3%
UPI/CVoter	August 16–22, 2016	48%	48%	Tied	1,752	± 3.0%
UPI/CVoter	August 15–21, 2016	48%	47%	1	1,795	± 3.0%
NBC News/SurveyMonkey	August 15–21, 2016	50%	42%	8	17,451	± 1.1%
American Research Group	August 17–20, 2016	47%	42%	5	994	± 3.2%
Morning Consult	August 16–20, 2016	44%	38%	6	2,001	± 2%
UPI/CVoter	August 14–20, 2016	48%	47%	1	1,191	± 3.0%
USC/Los Angeles Times	August 14–20, 2016	43%	45%	2	2,385	± 2.8%
Ipsos/Reuters	August 13–17, 2016	41%	36%	5	1,049	± 2.8%
UPI/CVoter	August 11–17, 2016	50%	46%	4	1,009	± 3.0%
UPI/CVoter	August 9–16, 2016	51%	44%	7	1,069	± 3.0%
Ipsos/Reuters	August 11–15, 2016	41%	35%	6	1,132	± 3%
Normington, Petts & Associates	August 9–15, 2016	50%	40%	10	1,000	± 3.1%
UPI/CVoter	August 9–15, 2016	51%	44%	7	1,035	± 3.0%
Morning Consult	August 11–14, 2016	44%	37%	7	2,001	± 2%
NBC News/SurveyMonkey	August 8–14, 2016	50%	41%	9	15,179	± 1.2%
UPI/CVoter	August 7–14, 2016	50%	45%	5	975	± 3.0%
UPI/CVoter	August 7–13, 2016	49%	46%	3	1,403	± 3.0%
UPI/CVoter	August 3–10, 2016	49%	45%	4	1,077	± 3.0%
Ipsos/Reuters	August 6–10, 2016	42%	36%	6	974	± 2.9%
YouGov/Economist	August 6–9, 2016	48%	41%	7	1,300	± 4.2%
UPI/CVoter	August 3–9, 2016	48%	46%	2	1,002	± 3.0%
Bloomberg Politics	August 5–8, 2016	50%	44%	6	749	± 3.6%
Ipsos/Reuters	August 4–8, 2016	42%	35%	7	1,152	± 3.0%
UPI/CVoter	August 2–8, 2016	49%	45%	4	993	± 3.0%
PSRAI	August 4–7, 2016	45%	39%	6	798	± 3.9%
UPI/CVoter	August 1–7, 2016	49%	44%	5	1,407	± 3.0%
NBC News/SurveyMonkey	August 1–7, 2016	51%	41%	10	11,480	± 1.2%
UPI/CVoter	July 31 – August 6, 2016	50%	43%	7	1,036	± 3.0%
USC/Los Angeles Times	July 31 – August 6, 2016	45%	44%	1	2,146	± 2.8%
Morning Consult	August 4–5, 2016	46%	37%	9	2,001	± 2%
ABC News/Washington Post	August 1–4, 2016	51%	44%	7	1,002	± 3.5%
Ipsos/Reuters	July 31 – August 4, 2016	42%	39%	3	1,154	± 3.0%
UPI/CVoter	July 29 – August 4, 2016	50%	44%	6	1,060	± 3.0%
IBD/TIPP	July 29 – August 4, 2016	46%	39%	7	921	± 3.4%
McClatchy/Marist	August 1–3, 2016	48%	33%	15	983	± 3.1%
NBC News/Wall Street Journal	July 31 – August 3, 2016	47%	38%	9	800	± 3.46%
Ipsos/Reuters	July 30 – August 3, 2016	43%	39%	4	1,072	± 3.5%
USC/Los Angeles Times	July 28 – August 3, 2016	45%	44%	1	2,175	± 2.4%
UPI/CVoter	July 27 – August 2, 2016	49%	46%	3	989	± 3.0%
Fox News	July 31 – August 2, 2016	49%	39%	10	1,022	± 3%
USC/Los Angeles Times	July 27 – August 2, 2016	44%	45%	1	2,186	± 2.2%
YouGov/Economist	July 31 – August 1, 2016	46%	43%	3	1,300	± 4%
Ipsos/Reuters	July 28 – August 1, 2016	43%	35%	8	1,289	± 3%
USC/Los Angeles Times	July 26 – August 1, 2016	43%	45%	2	2,171	± 2.5%
CNN/ORC	July 29–31, 2016	52%	43%	9	1,003	± 3%
CBS News	July 29–31, 2016	47%	41%	6	1,131	± 3%
NBC News/SurveyMonkey	July 25–31, 2016	50%	42%	8	12,742	± 1.2%
Morning Consult	July 29–30, 2016	43%	40%	3	1,931	± 2%
Public Policy Polling	July 29–30, 2016	50%	45%	5	1,276	± 2.7%

==== Polls conducted in 2016 ====
Polls in 2016

Poll source	Date	Democratic candidate	%	Republican candidate	%	Leading by %	Sample size	Margin of error
Ipsos/Reuters	July 25–29, 2016	Hillary Clinton	40%	Donald Trump	35%	5	1,290	± 2.4%
Rasmussen Reports	July 26–27, 2016	Hillary Clinton	43%	Donald Trump	42%	1	1,000	± 3.0%
Ipsos/Reuters	July 22–26, 2016	Hillary Clinton	37%	Donald Trump	39%	2	963	± 4.0%
USC/Los Angeles Times	July 20–26, 2016	Hillary Clinton	40%	Donald Trump	47%	7	2,150	± 3%
Economist/YouGov	July 23–24, 2016	Hillary Clinton	47%	Donald Trump	42%	5	1,300	± 4.5%
Morning Consult	July 22–24, 2016	Hillary Clinton	40%	Donald Trump	44%	4	2,502	± 2%
CBS News	July 22–24, 2016	Hillary Clinton	43%	Donald Trump	44%	1	1,118	± 4%
CNN/ORC	July 22–24, 2016	Hillary Clinton	45%	Donald Trump	48%	3	882	± 3.5%
University of Delaware	July 21–24, 2016	Hillary Clinton	46%	Donald Trump	42%	4	818	± 4%
NBC News/SurveyMonkey	July 18–24, 2016	Hillary Clinton	46%	Donald Trump	45%	1	12,931	± 1.2%
USC/Los Angeles Times	July 18–24, 2016	Hillary Clinton	41%	Donald Trump	45%	4	2,083	± 3%
Echelon Insights	July 21–22, 2016	Hillary Clinton	45%	Donald Trump	41%	4	912	± ?%
Ipsos/Reuters	July 18–22, 2016	Hillary Clinton	41%	Donald Trump	38%	3	1,036	± 4.0%
USC/Los Angeles Times	July 16–22, 2016	Hillary Clinton	42%	Donald Trump	44%	2	2,010	± %
American Research Group	July 17–20, 2016	Hillary Clinton	43%	Donald Trump	42%	1	990	± 3.2%
Ipsos/Reuters	July 16–20, 2016	Hillary Clinton	40%	Donald Trump	36%	4	1,522	± 2.9%
Rasmussen Reports	July 18–19, 2016	Hillary Clinton	42%	Donald Trump	43%	1	1,000	± 3.0%
Greenberg Quinlan Rosner	July 13–18, 2016	Hillary Clinton	50%	Donald Trump	43%	7	900	± 3.27%
Economist/YouGov	July 15–17, 2016	Hillary Clinton	45%	Donald Trump	41%	4	925	± 4.5%
NBC News/SurveyMonkey	July 11–17, 2016	Hillary Clinton	46%	Donald Trump	45%	1	9,436	± 1.4%
Morning Consult	July 14–16, 2016	Hillary Clinton	41%	Donald Trump	39%	2	2,002	± 2%
CNN/ORC	July 13–16, 2016	Hillary Clinton	49%	Donald Trump	42%	7	872	± 3.5%
icitizen	July 12–15, 2016	Hillary Clinton	46%	Donald Trump	41%	5	1,000	± %
ABC News/Washington Post	July 11–14, 2016	Hillary Clinton	47%	Donald Trump	43%	4	1,003	± 3.5%
USC/Los Angeles Times	July 8–14, 2016	Hillary Clinton	40%	Donald Trump	43%	3	1,608	± 3.0%
Rasmussen Reports	July 12–13, 2016	Hillary Clinton	37%	Donald Trump	44%	7	1,000	± 3.0%
NBC News/Wall Street Journal	July 9–13, 2016	Hillary Clinton	46%	Donald Trump	41%	5	1,000	± 3.1%
CBS News/New York Times	July 8–12, 2016	Hillary Clinton	40%	Donald Trump	40%	Tied	1,358	± 3.0%
The Economist/YouGov	July 9–11, 2016	Hillary Clinton	45%	Donald Trump	43%	2	1,300	± 4.2%
NBC News/SurveyMonkey	July 4–10, 2016	Hillary Clinton	47%	Donald Trump	44%	3	7,869	± 1.4%
Morning Consult	July 8–10, 2016	Hillary Clinton	42%	Donald Trump	41%	1	2,001	± 2%
McClatchy-Marist	July 5–9, 2016	Hillary Clinton	42%	Donald Trump	39%	3	1,053	± 3%
Ipsos/Reuters	July 2–6, 2016	Hillary Clinton	44%	Donald Trump	33%	11	1,345	± 2.8%
Rasmussen Reports	July 5, 2016	Hillary Clinton	40%	Donald Trump	42%	2	1,000	± 3.0%
Ipsos/Reuters	July 1–5, 2016	Hillary Clinton	46%	Donald Trump	33%	13	1,441	± 3.0%
The Economist/YouGov	July 2–4, 2016	Hillary Clinton	47%	Donald Trump	42%	5	1,300	± 3.9%
Morning Consult	June 30 – July 4, 2016	Hillary Clinton	41%	Donald Trump	40%	1	2,001	± 2%
NBC News/SurveyMonkey	June 27 – July 3, 2016	Hillary Clinton	48%	Donald Trump	43%	5	10,072	± 1.3%
Ipsos/Reuters	June 27 – July 1, 2016	Hillary Clinton	44%	Donald Trump	35%	9.4	1,080	± 3.5%
Rasmussen Reports	June 28–29, 2016	Hillary Clinton	39%	Donald Trump	43%	4	1,000	± 3.0%
Suffolk University/USA Today	June 26–29, 2016	Hillary Clinton	46%	Donald Trump	40%	5.2	1,000	± 3.0%
Ipsos/Reuters	June 25–29, 2016	Hillary Clinton	42%	Donald Trump	32%	10	1,247	± 2.8%
IBD/TIPP	June 24–29, 2016	Hillary Clinton	44%	Donald Trump	40%	4	837	± 3.5%
One America News Network/Gravis Marketing	June 27–28, 2016	Hillary Clinton	50%	Donald Trump	50%	Tied	2,162	± 2.1%
Public Policy Polling	June 27–28, 2016	Hillary Clinton	48%	Donald Trump	44%	4	947	± 3.2%
Fox News	June 26–28, 2016	Hillary Clinton	44%	Donald Trump	38%	6	1,017	± 3%
Morning Consult	June 24–27, 2016	Hillary Clinton	44%	Donald Trump	39%	5	1,998	± 2%
Quinnipiac University	June 21–27, 2016	Hillary Clinton	42%	Donald Trump	40%	2	1,610	± 2.4%
NBC News/SurveyMonkey	June 20–26, 2016	Hillary Clinton	49%	Donald Trump	41%	8	5,818	± 1.8%
Pew Research	June 15–26, 2016	Hillary Clinton	51%	Donald Trump	42%	9	1,655	± 2.7%
Ipsos/Reuters	June 20–24, 2016	Hillary Clinton	47%	Donald Trump	33%	14	1,201	± 3.3%
ABC News/Washington Post	June 20–23, 2016	Hillary Clinton	51%	Donald Trump	39%	12	1,001	± 3.5%
NBC News/Wall Street Journal	June 19–23, 2016	Hillary Clinton	46%	Donald Trump	41%	5	1,000	± 3.1%
Ipsos/Reuters	June 18–22, 2016	Hillary Clinton	44%	Donald Trump	34%	10	1,339	± 2.8%
Rasmussen Reports	June 20–21, 2016	Hillary Clinton	44%	Donald Trump	39%	5	1,000	± 3%
Economist/YouGov	June 18–20, 2016	Hillary Clinton	43%	Donald Trump	39%	4	1,011	± 4.2%
American Research Group	June 17–20, 2016	Hillary Clinton	50%	Donald Trump	41%	9	987	± 3.2%
Morning Consult	June 15–20, 2016	Hillary Clinton	42%	Donald Trump	40%	2	3,891	± 2%
CNN/ORC	June 16–19, 2016	Hillary Clinton	47%	Donald Trump	42%	5	891	± 3.5%
Monmouth University	June 15–19, 2016	Hillary Clinton	47%	Donald Trump	40%	7	803	± 3.5%
NBC News/SurveyMonkey	June 13–19, 2016	Hillary Clinton	48%	Donald Trump	42%	6	16,135	± 1.1%
Reuters/Ipsos	June 13–17, 2016	Hillary Clinton	46%	Donald Trump	35%	10.7	1,133	± 3.4%
One America News Network/Gravis Marketing	June 16, 2016	Hillary Clinton	51%	Donald Trump	49%	2	2,197	± 2.1%
Rasmussen Reports	June 14–15, 2016	Hillary Clinton	44%	Donald Trump	39%	5	1,000	± 3%
Ipsos/Reuters	June 11–15, 2016	Hillary Clinton	41%	Donald Trump	32%	9	1,323	± 2.8%
CNBC	June 11–13, 2016	Hillary Clinton	40%	Donald Trump	35%	5	801	± 3.5%
CBS News	June 9–13, 2016	Hillary Clinton	43%	Donald Trump	37%	6	1,048	± 3.0%
NBC News/SurveyMonkey	June 6–12, 2016	Hillary Clinton	49%	Donald Trump	42%	7	9,355	± 1.4%
NBC News/SurveyMonkey	June 6–12, 2016	Bernie Sanders	52%	Donald Trump	39%	13	9,355	± 1.4%
Morning Consult	June 8–9, 2016	Hillary Clinton	42%	Donald Trump	37%	5	1,362	± 3%
Fox News	June 5–8, 2016	Hillary Clinton	42%	Donald Trump	39%	3	1,004	± 3%
Fox News	June 5–8, 2016	Bernie Sanders	49%	Donald Trump	38%	11	1,004	± 3%
Ipsos/Reuters	June 4–8, 2016	Hillary Clinton	42%	Donald Trump	34%	8	1,716	± 2.7%
Rasmussen Reports	June 6–7, 2016	Hillary Clinton	42%	Donald Trump	38%	4	1,000	± 3%
Morning Consult	June 3–5, 2016	Hillary Clinton	44%	Donald Trump	40%	4	4,002	± 2%
Morning Consult	June 3–5, 2016	Bernie Sanders	51%	Donald Trump	38%	13	4,002	± 2%
YouGov/Economist	June 2–5, 2016	Hillary Clinton	44%	Donald Trump	41%	3	1,636	± 3.2%
YouGov/Economist	June 2–5, 2016	Bernie Sanders	48%	Donald Trump	37%	11	1,636	± 3.2%
IBD/TIPP	May 31 – June 5, 2016	Hillary Clinton	45%	Donald Trump	40%	5	828	± 3.3%
IBD/TIPP	May 31 – June 5, 2016	Bernie Sanders	49%	Donald Trump	39%	10	828	± 3.3%
NBC News/SurveyMonkey	May 30 – June 5, 2016	Hillary Clinton	48%	Donald Trump	44%	4	9,240	± 1.4%
NBC News/SurveyMonkey	May 30 – June 5, 2016	Bernie Sanders	52%	Donald Trump	40%	12	9,240	± 1.4%
Rasmussen Reports	May 31 – June 1, 2016	Hillary Clinton	39%	Donald Trump	38%	1	1,000	± 3%
Ipsos/Reuters	May 28 – June 1, 2016	Hillary Clinton	43%	Donald Trump	34%	9	1,332	± 2.8%
Morning Consult	May 24–30, 2016	Hillary Clinton	42%	Donald Trump	39%	3	4,002	± 2%
Quinnipiac University	May 24–30, 2016	Hillary Clinton	45%	Donald Trump	41%	4	1,561	± 2.5%
Quinnipiac University	May 24–30, 2016	Bernie Sanders	48%	Donald Trump	39%	9	1,561	± 2.5%
NBC News/SurveyMonkey	May 23–29, 2016	Hillary Clinton	47%	Donald Trump	45%	2	12,969	± 1.2%
NBC News/SurveyMonkey	May 23–29, 2016	Bernie Sanders	52%	Donald Trump	40%	12	12,969	± 1.2%
Ipsos/Reuters	May 21–25, 2016	Hillary Clinton	41%	Donald Trump	36%	5	1,576	± 2.8%
Rasmussen Reports	May 23–24, 2016	Hillary Clinton	40%	Donald Trump	39%	1	1,000	± 3.0%
YouGov/Economist	May 20–23, 2016	Hillary Clinton	42%	Donald Trump	41%	1	2,000	± 3.1%
YouGov/Economist	May 20–23, 2016	Bernie Sanders	48%	Donald Trump	39%	9	2,000	± 3.1%
Morning Consult	May 19–23, 2016	Hillary Clinton	38%	Donald Trump	35%	3	2,001	± 2%
NBC News/SurveyMonkey	May 16–22, 2016	Hillary Clinton	47%	Donald Trump	43%	4	14,513	± 1%
NBC News/SurveyMonkey	May 16–22, 2016	Bernie Sanders	53%	Donald Trump	41%	12	14,513	± 1%
American Research Group	May 17–20, 2016	Hillary Clinton	46%	Donald Trump	46%	Tie	2,001	± 2%
ABC News/Washington Post	May 16–19, 2016	Hillary Clinton	44%	Donald Trump	46%	2	829	± 3.5%
Schoen Consulting	May 16–19, 2016	Hillary Clinton	44%	Donald Trump	42%	2	1,000	± 3%
NBC News/Wall Street Journal	May 15–19, 2016	Hillary Clinton	46%	Donald Trump	43%	3	1,000	± 3.0%
NBC News/Wall Street Journal	May 15–19, 2016	Bernie Sanders	54%	Donald Trump	39%	15	1,000	± 3.0%
Rasmussen Reports	May 17–18, 2016	Hillary Clinton	37%	Donald Trump	42%	5	1,000	± 3.0%
Ipsos/Reuters	May 14–18, 2016	Hillary Clinton	41%	Donald Trump	36%	5	1,677	± 2.7%
Fox News	May 14–17, 2016	Hillary Clinton	42%	Donald Trump	45%	3	1,021	± 3%
Fox News	May 14–17, 2016	Bernie Sanders	46%	Donald Trump	42%	4	1,021	± 3%
CBS News/New York Times	May 13–17, 2016	Hillary Clinton	47%	Donald Trump	41%	6	1,300	± 3%
CBS News/New York Times	May 13–17, 2016	Bernie Sanders	51%	Donald Trump	38%	13	1,300	± 3%
McLaughlin	May 11–16, 2016	Hillary Clinton	46%	Donald Trump	42%	4	1,000	± 3.1%
Morning Consult	May 11–15, 2016	Hillary Clinton	42%	Donald Trump	40%	2	3,971	± 2%
Morning Consult	May 11–15, 2016	Bernie Sanders	50%	Donald Trump	37%	13	3,971	± 2%
NBC News/SurveyMonkey	May 9–15, 2016	Hillary Clinton	48%	Donald Trump	45%	3	12,507	± 1.2%
NBC News/SurveyMonkey	May 9–15, 2016	Bernie Sanders	53%	Donald Trump	41%	12	12,507	± 1.2%
Ipsos/Reuters	May 7–11, 2016	Hillary Clinton	41%	Donald Trump	37%	4	1,611	± 2.8%
Ipsos/Reuters	May 6–10, 2016	Hillary Clinton	41%	Donald Trump	40%	1	1,289	± 3.0%
Public Policy Polling	May 6–9, 2016	Hillary Clinton	47%	Donald Trump	41%	6	1,222	± 3.2%
Public Policy Polling	May 6–9, 2016	Bernie Sanders	50%	Donald Trump	39%	11	1,222	± 3.2%
Ipsos/Reuters	April 30 – May 4, 2016	Hillary Clinton	45%	Donald Trump	36%	9	1,277	± 3.1%
Morning Consult	April 29 – May 2, 2016	Hillary Clinton	45%	Donald Trump	40%	5	1,976	± 2.0%
CNN/ORC	April 28 – May 1, 2016	Hillary Clinton	54%	Donald Trump	41%	13	1,001	± 3.5%
Rasmussen Reports	April 27–28, 2016	Hillary Clinton	39%	Donald Trump	41%	2	1,000	± 3.0%
Rasmussen Reports	April 25–26, 2016	Hillary Clinton	38%	Donald Trump	38%	Tied	1,000	± 3.0%
GWU/Battleground	April 17–20, 2016	Hillary Clinton	46%	Donald Trump	43%	3	1,000	± 3.1%
GWU/Battleground	April 17–20, 2016	Bernie Sanders	51%	Donald Trump	40%	11	1,000	± 3.1%
NBC News/Wall Street Journal	April 10–14, 2016	Hillary Clinton	50%	Donald Trump	39%	11	1,000	± 3.1%
NBC News/Wall Street Journal	April 10–14, 2016	Hillary Clinton	46%	Ted Cruz	44%	2	1,000	± 3.1%
NBC News/Wall Street Journal	April 10–14, 2016	Hillary Clinton	39%	John Kasich	51%	12	1,000	± 3.1%
NBC News/Wall Street Journal	April 10–14, 2016	Bernie Sanders	52%	Ted Cruz	40%	12	1,000	± 3.1%
Fox News	April 11–13, 2016	Hillary Clinton	48%	Donald Trump	41%	7	1,021	± 3%
Fox News	April 11–13, 2016	Hillary Clinton	45%	Ted Cruz	44%	1	1,021	± 3%
Fox News	April 11–13, 2016	Hillary Clinton	40%	John Kasich	49%	9	1,021	± 3%
Fox News	April 11–13, 2016	Bernie Sanders	53%	Donald Trump	39%	14	1,021	± 3%
Fox News	April 11–13, 2016	Bernie Sanders	51%	Ted Cruz	39%	12	1,021	± 3%
Fox News	April 11–13, 2016	Bernie Sanders	47%	John Kasich	43%	4	1,021	± 3%
CBS News	April 8–12, 2016	Hillary Clinton	50%	Donald Trump	40%	10	1,098	± 3.0%
CBS News	April 8–12, 2016	Hillary Clinton	45%	Ted Cruz	42%	3	1,098	± 3.0%
CBS News	April 8–12, 2016	Hillary Clinton	41%	John Kasich	47%	6	1,098	± 3.0%
CBS News	April 8–12, 2016	Bernie Sanders	53%	Donald Trump	36%	17	1,098	± 3.0%
CBS News	April 8–12, 2016	Bernie Sanders	50%	Ted Cruz	38%	12	1,098	± 3.0%
CBS News	April 8–12, 2016	Bernie Sanders	46%	John Kasich	41%	5	1,098	± 3.0%
IBD/TIPP	March 28 – April 2, 2016	Hillary Clinton	47%	Donald Trump	35%	12	902	± 3.3%
IBD/TIPP	March 28 – April 2, 2016	Hillary Clinton	44%	Ted Cruz	39%	5	902	± 3.3%
IBD/TIPP	March 28 – April 2, 2016	Hillary Clinton	38%	John Kasich	45%	7	902	± 3.3%
IBD/TIPP	March 28 – April 2, 2016	Bernie Sanders	53%	Donald Trump	36%	17	902	± 3.3%
IBD/TIPP	March 28 – April 2, 2016	Bernie Sanders	50%	Ted Cruz	38%	12	902	± 3.3%
IBD/TIPP	March 28 – April 2, 2016	Bernie Sanders	45%	John Kasich	42%	3	902	± 3.3%
McClatchy-Marist	March 29–31, 2016	Hillary Clinton	50%	Donald Trump	41%	9	1,297	± 2.7%
McClatchy-Marist	March 29–31, 2016	Hillary Clinton	47%	Ted Cruz	47%	Tied	1,297	± 2.7%
McClatchy-Marist	March 29–31, 2016	Hillary Clinton	42%	John Kasich	51%	9	1,297	± 2.7%
McClatchy-Marist	March 29–31, 2016	Bernie Sanders	57%	Donald Trump	37%	20	1,297	± 2.7%
McClatchy-Marist	March 29–31, 2016	Bernie Sanders	53%	Ted Cruz	41%	12	1,297	± 2.7%
McClatchy-Marist	March 29–31, 2016	Bernie Sanders	52%	John Kasich	41%	11	1,297	± 2.7%
Public Policy Polling	March 24–26, 2016	Hillary Clinton	48%	Donald Trump	41%	7	1,083	± 3.0%
Public Policy Polling	March 24–26, 2016	Hillary Clinton	45%	Ted Cruz	42%	3	1,083	± 3.0%
Public Policy Polling	March 24–26, 2016	Hillary Clinton	41%	John Kasich	45%	4	1,083	± 3.0%
Public Policy Polling	March 24–26, 2016	Hillary Clinton	44%	Paul Ryan	39%	5	1,083	± 3.0%
Public Policy Polling	March 24–26, 2016	Hillary Clinton	45%	Mitt Romney	32%	13	1,083	± 3.0%
Public Policy Polling	March 24–26, 2016	Bernie Sanders	48%	Donald Trump	40%	8	1,083	± 3.0%
Public Policy Polling	March 24–26, 2016	Bernie Sanders	48%	Ted Cruz	41%	7	1,083	± 3.0%
Public Policy Polling	March 24–26, 2016	Bernie Sanders	41%	John Kasich	44%	3	1,083	± 3.0%
Public Policy Polling	March 24–26, 2016	Bernie Sanders	45%	Paul Ryan	38%	7	1,083	± 3.0%
Public Policy Polling	March 24–26, 2016	Bernie Sanders	48%	Mitt Romney	31%	17	1,083	± 3.0%
Bloomberg Politics	March 19–22, 2016	Hillary Clinton	54%	Donald Trump	36%	18	815	± 5.1%
Bloomberg Politics	March 19–22, 2016	Hillary Clinton	51%	Ted Cruz	42%	9	815	± 5.1%
Bloomberg Politics	March 19–22, 2016	Hillary Clinton	43%	John Kasich	47%	4	815	± 5.1%
Quinnipiac University	March 16–21, 2016	Hillary Clinton	46%	Donald Trump	40%	6	1,451	± 2.6%
Quinnipiac University	March 16–21, 2016	Hillary Clinton	45%	Ted Cruz	42%	3	1,451	± 2.6%
Quinnipiac University	March 16–21, 2016	Hillary Clinton	39%	John Kasich	47%	8	1,451	± 2.6%
Quinnipiac University	March 16–21, 2016	Bernie Sanders	52%	Donald Trump	38%	14	1,451	± 2.6%
Quinnipiac University	March 16–21, 2016	Bernie Sanders	50%	Ted Cruz	39%	11	1,451	± 2.6%
Quinnipiac University	March 16–21, 2016	Bernie Sanders	44%	John Kasich	45%	1	1,451	± 2.6%
CBS News/New York Times	March 17–20, 2016	Hillary Clinton	50%	Donald Trump	40%	10	1,058	± 3.0%
CBS News/New York Times	March 17–20, 2016	Hillary Clinton	47%	Ted Cruz	44%	3	1,058	± 3.0%
CBS News/New York Times	March 17–20, 2016	Hillary Clinton	43%	John Kasich	47%	4	1,058	± 3.0%
CBS News/New York Times	March 17–20, 2016	Bernie Sanders	53%	Donald Trump	38%	15	1,058	± 3.0%
CNN/ORC	March 17–20, 2016	Hillary Clinton	53%	Donald Trump	41%	12	925	± 3.0%
CNN/ORC	March 17–20, 2016	Hillary Clinton	48%	Ted Cruz	48%	Tied	925	± 3.0%
CNN/ORC	March 17–20, 2016	Hillary Clinton	45%	John Kasich	51%	6	925	± 3.0%
CNN/ORC	March 17–20, 2016	Bernie Sanders	58%	Donald Trump	38%	20	925	± 3.0%
CNN/ORC	March 17–20, 2016	Bernie Sanders	55%	Ted Cruz	42%	13	925	± 3.0%
CNN/ORC	March 17–20, 2016	Bernie Sanders	51%	John Kasich	45%	6	925	± 3.0%
Monmouth University	March 17–20, 2016	Hillary Clinton	48%	Donald Trump	38%	10	848	± 3.4%
Monmouth University	March 17–20, 2016	Hillary Clinton	45%	Ted Cruz	40%	5	848	± 3.4%
Monmouth University	March 17–20, 2016	Hillary Clinton	39%	John Kasich	45%	6	848	± 3.4%
NBC News/Wall Street Journal	March 3–6, 2016	Hillary Clinton	51%	Donald Trump	38%	13	1,200	± 2.83%
NBC News/Wall Street Journal	March 3–6, 2016	Hillary Clinton	47%	Ted Cruz	45%	2	1,200	± 2.83%
NBC News/Wall Street Journal	March 3–6, 2016	Hillary Clinton	46%	Marco Rubio	46%	Tied	1,200	± 2.83%
NBC News/Wall Street Journal	March 3–6, 2016	Bernie Sanders	55%	Donald Trump	37%	18	1,200	± 2.83%
ABC News/Washington Post	March 3–6, 2016	Hillary Clinton	50%	Donald Trump	41%	9	864	± 4%
Rasmussen Reports	February 29 – March 1, 2016	Hillary Clinton	41%	Donald Trump	36%	5	1,000	± 3%
CNN/ORC	February 24–27, 2016	Hillary Clinton	52%	Donald Trump	44%	8	920	± 3%
CNN/ORC	February 24–27, 2016	Hillary Clinton	48%	Ted Cruz	49%	1	920	± 3%
CNN/ORC	February 24–27, 2016	Hillary Clinton	47%	Marco Rubio	50%	3	920	± 3%
CNN/ORC	February 24–27, 2016	Bernie Sanders	55%	Donald Trump	43%	12	920	± 3%
CNN/ORC	February 24–27, 2016	Bernie Sanders	57%	Ted Cruz	40%	17	920	± 3%
CNN/ORC	February 24–27, 2016	Bernie Sanders	53%	Marco Rubio	45%	8	920	± 3%
Fox News	February 15–17, 2016	Hillary Clinton	47%	Donald Trump	42%	5	1,031	± 3%
Fox News	February 15–17, 2016	Hillary Clinton	45%	Ted Cruz	46%	1	1,031	± 3%
Fox News	February 15–17, 2016	Hillary Clinton	44%	Marco Rubio	48%	4	1,031	± 3%
Fox News	February 15–17, 2016	Hillary Clinton	44%	John Kasich	47%	3	1,031	± 3%
Fox News	February 15–17, 2016	Hillary Clinton	45%	Jeb Bush	46%	1	1,031	± 3%
Fox News	February 15–17, 2016	Bernie Sanders	53%	Donald Trump	38%	15	1,031	± 3%
Suffolk University/USA Today	February 11–15, 2016	Hillary Clinton	43%	Donald Trump	45%	2	1,000	± 3%
Suffolk University/USA Today	February 11–15, 2016	Hillary Clinton	42%	Marco Rubio	48%	6	1,000	± 3%
Suffolk University/USA Today	February 11–15, 2016	Hillary Clinton	44%	Ted Cruz	45%	1	1,000	± 3%
Suffolk University/USA Today	February 11–15, 2016	Hillary Clinton	38%	John Kasich	49%	11	1,000	± 3%
Suffolk University/USA Today	February 11–15, 2016	Bernie Sanders	42%	Marco Rubio	46%	4	1,000	± 3%
Suffolk University/USA Today	February 11–15, 2016	Bernie Sanders	44%	Ted Cruz	42%	2	1,000	± 3%
Suffolk University/USA Today	February 11–15, 2016	Bernie Sanders	41%	John Kasich	44%	3	1,000	± 3%
Suffolk University/USA Today	February 11–15, 2016	Bernie Sanders	43%	Donald Trump	44%	1	1,000	± 3%
Quinnipiac University	February 10–15, 2016	Hillary Clinton	44%	Donald Trump	43%	1	1,342	± 2.7%
Quinnipiac University	February 10–15, 2016	Hillary Clinton	43%	Ted Cruz	46%	3	1,342	± 2.7%
Quinnipiac University	February 10–15, 2016	Hillary Clinton	41%	Marco Rubio	48%	7	1,342	± 2.7%
Quinnipiac University	February 10–15, 2016	Hillary Clinton	43%	Jeb Bush	44%	1	1,342	± 2.7%
Quinnipiac University	February 10–15, 2016	Hillary Clinton	39%	John Kasich	47%	8	1,342	± 2.7%
Quinnipiac University	February 10–15, 2016	Bernie Sanders	48%	Donald Trump	42%	6	1,342	± 2.7%
Quinnipiac University	February 10–15, 2016	Bernie Sanders	49%	Ted Cruz	39%	10	1,342	± 2.7%
Quinnipiac University	February 10–15, 2016	Bernie Sanders	47%	Marco Rubio	41%	6	1,342	± 2.7%
Quinnipiac University	February 10–15, 2016	Bernie Sanders	49%	Jeb Bush	39%	10	1,342	± 2.7%
Quinnipiac University	February 10–15, 2016	Bernie Sanders	45%	John Kasich	41%	4	1,342	± 2.7%
Quinnipiac University	February 2–4, 2016	Hillary Clinton	46%	Donald Trump	41%	5	1,125	± 2.9%
Quinnipiac University	February 2–4, 2016	Hillary Clinton	41%	Marco Rubio	48%	7	1,125	± 2.9%
Quinnipiac University	February 2–4, 2016	Hillary Clinton	45%	Ted Cruz	45%	Tied	1,125	± 2.9%
Quinnipiac University	February 2–4, 2016	Bernie Sanders	49%	Donald Trump	39%	10	1,125	± 2.9%
Quinnipiac University	February 2–4, 2016	Bernie Sanders	46%	Ted Cruz	42%	4	1,125	± 2.9%
Quinnipiac University	February 2–4, 2016	Bernie Sanders	43%	Marco Rubio	43%	Tied	1,125	± 2.9%
Public Policy Polling	February 2–3, 2016	Hillary Clinton	46%	Jeb Bush	39%	7	1,236	
Public Policy Polling	February 2–3, 2016	Hillary Clinton	47%	Ben Carson	44%	3	1,236	
Public Policy Polling	February 2–3, 2016	Hillary Clinton	46%	Ted Cruz	44%	2	1,236	
Public Policy Polling	February 2–3, 2016	Hillary Clinton	44%	Marco Rubio	46%	2	1,236	
Public Policy Polling	February 2–3, 2016	Hillary Clinton	47%	Donald Trump	40%	7	1,236	
Public Policy Polling	February 2–3, 2016	Bernie Sanders	46%	Jeb Bush	40%	6	1,236	
Public Policy Polling	February 2–3, 2016	Bernie Sanders	44%	Ben Carson	44%	Tied	1,236	
Public Policy Polling	February 2–3, 2016	Bernie Sanders	44%	Ted Cruz	42%	2	1,236	
Public Policy Polling	February 2–3, 2016	Bernie Sanders	43%	Marco Rubio	45%	2	1,236	
Public Policy Polling	February 2–3, 2016	Bernie Sanders	46%	Donald Trump	42%	4	1,236	
CNN/ORC	January 21–24, 2016	Hillary Clinton	48%	Donald Trump	47%	1	1,002	± 3.0%
CNN/ORC	January 21–24, 2016	Hillary Clinton	47%	Marco Rubio	50%	3	1,002	± 3.0%
CNN/ORC	January 21–24, 2016	Hillary Clinton	47%	Ted Cruz	50%	3	1,002	± 3.0%
CNN/ORC	January 21–24, 2016	Bernie Sanders	50%	Donald Trump	47%	3	1,002	± 3.0%
CNN/ORC	January 21–24, 2016	Bernie Sanders	49%	Marco Rubio	48%	1	1,002	± 3.0%
CNN/ORC	January 21–24, 2016	Bernie Sanders	50%	Ted Cruz	47%	3	1,002	± 3.0%
Morning Consult	January 14–17, 2016	Hillary Clinton	43%	Jeb Bush	39%	4	4060	± 2.0%
Morning Consult	January 14–17, 2016	Hillary Clinton	43%	Chris Christie	39%	4	4060	± 2.0%
Morning Consult	January 14–17, 2016	Hillary Clinton	42%	Ben Carson	42%	Tied	4060	± 2.0%
Morning Consult	January 14–17, 2016	Hillary Clinton	43%	Marco Rubio	41%	2	4060	± 2.0%
Morning Consult	January 14–17, 2016	Hillary Clinton	44%	Donald Trump	42%	2	4060	± 2.0%
Morning Consult	January 14–17, 2016	Hillary Clinton	43%	Ted Cruz	41%	2	4060	± 2.0%
NBC News/Wall Street Journal	January 9–13, 2016	Hillary Clinton	51%	Donald Trump	41%	10	800	± 3.5%
NBC News/Wall Street Journal	January 9–13, 2016	Bernie Sanders	54%	Donald Trump	39%	15	800	± 3.5%
Morning Consult	January 8–10, 2016	Hillary Clinton	43%	Jeb Bush	40%	3	2173	± 2.0%
Morning Consult	January 8–10, 2016	Hillary Clinton	43%	Chris Christie	39%	4	2173	± 2.0%
Morning Consult	January 8–10, 2016	Hillary Clinton	42%	Ben Carson	41%	1	2173	± 2.0%
Morning Consult	January 8–10, 2016	Hillary Clinton	43%	Marco Rubio	40%	3	2173	± 2.0%
Morning Consult	January 8–10, 2016	Hillary Clinton	42%	Donald Trump	44%	2	2173	± 2.0%
Morning Consult	January 8–10, 2016	Hillary Clinton	44%	Ted Cruz	40%	4	2173	± 2.0%
Gravis Marketing/One America News Network	January 10, 2016	Hillary Clinton	49%	Donald Trump	51%	2	2416	± 2.0%
Gravis Marketing/One America News Network	January 10, 2016	Hillary Clinton	50%	Jeb Bush	50%	Tied	2416	± 2.0%
Gravis Marketing/One America News Network	January 10, 2016	Hillary Clinton	48%	Marco Rubio	52%	4	2416	± 2.0%
Gravis Marketing/One America News Network	January 10, 2016	Hillary Clinton	49%	Rand Paul	51%	2	2416	± 2.0%
Gravis Marketing/One America News Network	January 10, 2016	Hillary Clinton	50%	Ted Cruz	50%	Tied	2416	± 2.0%
Gravis Marketing/One America News Network	January 10, 2016	Hillary Clinton	49%	Ben Carson	51%	2	2416	± 2.0%
Gravis Marketing/One America News Network	January 10, 2016	Hillary Clinton	50%	Carly Fiorina	50%	Tied	2416	± 2.0%
Fox News	January 4–7, 2016	Hillary Clinton	44%	Jeb Bush	44%	Tied	1006	3.0%
Fox News	January 4–7, 2016	Hillary Clinton	44%	Donald Trump	47%	3	1006	3.0%
Fox News	January 4–7, 2016	Hillary Clinton	43%	Ted Cruz	50%	7	1006	3.0%
Fox News	January 4–7, 2016	Hillary Clinton	41%	Marco Rubio	50%	9	1006	3.0%

==== Polls conducted in 2015 ====
Polls in 2015

Poll source	Date	Democratic candidate	%	Republican candidate	%	Leading by %	Sample Size	Margin of error
Rasmussen Reports	December 22–23, 2015	Hillary Clinton	37%	Donald Trump	36%	1	1000	± 3.0%
CNN/ORC	December 17–21, 2015	Hillary Clinton	49%	Donald Trump	47%	2	927	± 3.0%
CNN/ORC	December 17–21, 2015	Hillary Clinton	46%	Marco Rubio	49%	3	927	± 3.0%
CNN/ORC	December 17–21, 2015	Hillary Clinton	46%	Ted Cruz	48%	2	927	± 3.0%
Ipsos/Reuters	December 16–21, 2015	Hillary Clinton	39%	Donald Trump	27%	12	1627	± 2.8–3.7%
Emerson College Polling Society	December 17–20, 2015	Hillary Clinton	46%	Jeb Bush	41%	5	754	± 3.4%
Emerson College Polling Society	December 17–20, 2015	Hillary Clinton	45%	Marco Rubio	45%	Tied	754	± 3.4%
Emerson College Polling Society	December 17–20, 2015	Hillary Clinton	48%	Donald Trump	46%	2	754	± 3.4%
Emerson College Polling Society	December 17–20, 2015	Hillary Clinton	47%	Ted Cruz	45%	2	754	± 3.4%
Quinnipiac University	December 16–20, 2015	Hillary Clinton	47%	Donald Trump	40%	7	1140	± 2.9%
Quinnipiac University	December 16–20, 2015	Hillary Clinton	44%	Marco Rubio	43%	1	1140	± 2.9%
Quinnipiac University	December 16–20, 2015	Hillary Clinton	44%	Ted Cruz	44%	Tied	1140	± 2.9%
Quinnipiac University	December 16–20, 2015	Bernie Sanders	51%	Donald Trump	38%	13	1140	± 2.9%
Quinnipiac University	December 16–20, 2015	Bernie Sanders	42%	Marco Rubio	45%	3	1140	± 2.9%
Quinnipiac University	December 16–20, 2015	Bernie Sanders	43%	Ted Cruz	44%	1	1140	± 2.9%
Fox News	December 16–17, 2015	Hillary Clinton	49%	Donald Trump	38%	11	1013	± 3.0%
Fox News	December 16–17, 2015	Hillary Clinton	45%	Ted Cruz	45%	Tied	1013	± 3.0%
Fox News	December 16–17, 2015	Hillary Clinton	43%	Marco Rubio	45%	2	1013	± 3.0%
Fox News	December 16–17, 2015	Hillary Clinton	46%	Ben Carson	44%	2	1013	± 3.0%
Public Policy Polling	December 16–17, 2015	Hillary Clinton	46%	Donald Trump	43%	3	1267	± 2.8%
Public Policy Polling	December 16–17, 2015	Hillary Clinton	45%	Ted Cruz	43%	2	1267	± 2.8%
Public Policy Polling	December 16–17, 2015	Hillary Clinton	43%	Marco Rubio	44%	1	1267	± 2.8%
Public Policy Polling	December 16–17, 2015	Hillary Clinton	45%	Ben Carson	45%	Tied	1267	± 2.8%
Public Policy Polling	December 16–17, 2015	Hillary Clinton	44%	Jeb Bush	39%	5	1267	± 2.8%
Public Policy Polling	December 16–17, 2015	Bernie Sanders	41%	Donald Trump	43%	2	1267	± 2.8%
Public Policy Polling	December 16–17, 2015	Bernie Sanders	41%	Ted Cruz	42%	1	1267	± 2.8%
Public Policy Polling	December 16–17, 2015	Bernie Sanders	39%	Marco Rubio	42%	3	1267	± 2.8%
Public Policy Polling	December 16–17, 2015	Bernie Sanders	41%	Ben Carson	41%	Tied	1267	± 2.8%
Public Policy Polling	December 16–17, 2015	Bernie Sanders	41%	Jeb Bush	42%	1	1267	± 2.8%
Morning Consult	December 11–15, 2015	Hillary Clinton	46%	Jeb Bush	38%	8	4038	± 2.0%
Morning Consult	December 11–15, 2015	Hillary Clinton	46%	Chris Christie	35%	11	4038	± 2.0%
Morning Consult	December 11–15, 2015	Hillary Clinton	45%	Ben Carson	39%	6	4038	± 2.0%
Morning Consult	December 11–15, 2015	Hillary Clinton	45%	Marco Rubio	36%	9	4038	± 2.0%
Morning Consult	December 11–15, 2015	Hillary Clinton	46%	Donald Trump	41%	5	4038	± 2.0%
Morning Consult	December 11–15, 2015	Hillary Clinton	48%	Ted Cruz	37%	9	4038	± 2.0%
ABC News/Washington Post	December 10–13, 2015	Hillary Clinton	50%	Donald Trump	44%	6	851	± 3.5%
NBC News/Wall Street Journal	December 6–9, 2015	Hillary Clinton	50%	Donald Trump	40%	10	1000	± 3.4%
NBC News/Wall Street Journal	December 6–9, 2015	Hillary Clinton	48%	Ted Cruz	45%	3	1000	± 3.4%
NBC News/Wall Street Journal	December 6–9, 2015	Hillary Clinton	46%	Ben Carson	47%	1	1000	± 3.4%
NBC News/Wall Street Journal	December 6–9, 2015	Hillary Clinton	45%	Marco Rubio	48%	3	1000	± 3.4%
Hillary Clinton	51%	Jeb Bush	49%	2				
Hillary Clinton	50%	Marco Rubio	50%	Tied				
Hillary Clinton	51%	Rand Paul	49%	2				
Hillary Clinton	52%	Ted Cruz	48%	4				
Hillary Clinton	51%	Ben Carson	49%	2				
Hillary Clinton	52%	Carly Fiorina	48%	4				
Morning Consult	December 3–7, 2015							
Morning Consult	December 3–7, 2015	Hillary Clinton	41%	Jeb Bush	41%	Tied	2047	± 2.0%
Morning Consult	December 3–7, 2015	Hillary Clinton	40%	Chris Christie	40%	Tied	2047	± 2.0%
Morning Consult	December 3–7, 2015	Hillary Clinton	40%	Ben Carson	45%	5	2047	± 2.0%
Morning Consult	December 3–7, 2015	Hillary Clinton	40%	Marco Rubio	41%	1	2047	± 2.0%
Morning Consult	December 3–7, 2015	Hillary Clinton	40%	Donald Trump	45%	5	2047	± 2.0%
Morning Consult	December 3–7, 2015	Hillary Clinton	42%	Ted Cruz	40%	2	2047	± 2.0%
USA Today/Suffolk University	December 2–6, 2015	Hillary Clinton	48%	Donald Trump	44%	4	1000	± 3.0%
USA Today/Suffolk University	December 2–6, 2015	Hillary Clinton	47%	Ted Cruz	45%	2	1000	± 3.0%
USA Today/Suffolk University	December 2–6, 2015	Hillary Clinton	45%	Marco Rubio	48%	3	1000	± 3.0%
USA Today/Suffolk University	December 2–6, 2015	Hillary Clinton	46%	Ben Carson	45%	1	1000	± 3.0%
Saint Leo University Polling Institute	November 29 – December 3, 2015	Hillary Clinton	51%	Ben Carson	38%	13	1007	± 3.0%
Saint Leo University Polling Institute	November 29 – December 3, 2015	Hillary Clinton	48%	Marco Rubio	38%	10	1007	± 3.0%
Saint Leo University Polling Institute	November 29 – December 3, 2015	Hillary Clinton	51%	Donald Trump	37%	14	1007	± 3.0%
Saint Leo University Polling Institute	November 29 – December 3, 2015	Hillary Clinton	52%	Ted Cruz	36%	16	1007	± 3.0%
Saint Leo University Polling Institute	November 29 – December 3, 2015	Hillary Clinton	49%	Jeb Bush	35%	14	1007	± 3.0%
Saint Leo University Polling Institute	November 29 – December 3, 2015	Hillary Clinton	51%	Carly Fiorina	32%	19	1007	± 3.0%
MSNBC/Telemundo/Marist	November 15 – December 2, 2015	Hillary Clinton	52%	Donald Trump	41%	11	2360	± 2.0%
MSNBC/Telemundo/Marist	November 15 – December 2, 2015	Hillary Clinton	51%	Ted Cruz	44%	7	2360	± 2.0%
MSNBC/Telemundo/Marist	November 15 – December 2, 2015	Hillary Clinton	49%	Jeb Bush	45%	4	2360	± 2.0%
MSNBC/Telemundo/Marist	November 15 – December 2, 2015	Hillary Clinton	48%	Marco Rubio	45%	3	2360	± 2.0%
MSNBC/Telemundo/Marist	November 15 – December 2, 2015	Hillary Clinton	48%	Ben Carson	47%	1	2360	± 2.0%
CNN/ORC	November 27 – December 1, 2015							
CNN/ORC	November 27 – December 1, 2015	Hillary Clinton	49%	Donald Trump	46%	3	1020	± 3.0%
CNN/ORC	November 27 – December 1, 2015	Hillary Clinton	47%	Ben Carson	50%	3	1020	± 3.0%
CNN/ORC	November 27 – December 1, 2015	Hillary Clinton	48%	Marco Rubio	49%	1	1020	± 3.0%
CNN/ORC	November 27 – December 1, 2015	Hillary Clinton	50%	Ted Cruz	47%	3	1020	± 3.0%
CNN/ORC	November 27 – December 1, 2015	Hillary Clinton	49%	Jeb Bush	47%	2	1020	± 3.0%
Quinnipiac University	November 23–30, 2015							
Quinnipiac University	November 23–30, 2015	Hillary Clinton	46%	Ben Carson	43%	3	1453	± 2.6%
Quinnipiac University	November 23–30, 2015	Hillary Clinton	47%	Donald Trump	41%	6	1453	± 2.6%
Quinnipiac University	November 23–30, 2015	Hillary Clinton	45%	Marco Rubio	44%	1	1453	± 2.6%
Quinnipiac University	November 23–30, 2015	Hillary Clinton	47%	Ted Cruz	42%	5	1453	± 2.6%
Quinnipiac University	November 23–30, 2015	Bernie Sanders	47%	Ben Carson	41%	6	1453	± 2.6%
Quinnipiac University	November 23–30, 2015	Bernie Sanders	49%	Donald Trump	41%	8	1453	± 2.6%
Quinnipiac University	November 23–30, 2015	Bernie Sanders	44%	Marco Rubio	43%	1	1453	± 2.6%
Quinnipiac University	November 23–30, 2015	Bernie Sanders	49%	Ted Cruz	39%	10	1453	± 2.6%
ABC News/Washington Post	November 16–19, 2015							
ABC News/Washington Post	November 16–19, 2015	Hillary Clinton	46%	Jeb Bush	43%	3	1004	± 3.5%
ABC News/Washington Post	November 16–19, 2015	Hillary Clinton	50%	Donald Trump	42%	8	1004	± 3.5%
ABC News/Washington Post	November 16–19, 2015	Hillary Clinton	49%	Ben Carson	40%	9	1004	± 3.5%
ABC News/Washington Post	November 16–19, 2015	Hillary Clinton	47%	Ted Cruz	40%	7	1004	± 3.5%
ABC News/Washington Post	November 16–19, 2015	Hillary Clinton	47%	Marco Rubio	43%	4	1004	± 3.5%
Fox News	November 16–19, 2015							
Fox News	November 16–19, 2015	Bernie Sanders	41%	Donald Trump	46%	5	1016	± 3.0%
Fox News	November 16–19, 2015	Hillary Clinton	41%	Donald Trump	46%	5	1016	± 3.0%
Fox News	November 16–19, 2015	Hillary Clinton	42%	Ben Carson	47%	5	1016	± 3.0%
Fox News	November 16–19, 2015	Hillary Clinton	42%	Marco Rubio	50%	8	1016	± 3.0%
Fox News	November 16–19, 2015	Hillary Clinton	41%	Ted Cruz	45%	4	1016	± 3.0%
Fox News	November 16–19, 2015	Hillary Clinton	39%	Jeb Bush	45%	6	1016	± 3.0%
Fox News	November 16–19, 2015	Hillary Clinton	42%	Carly Fiorina	42%	Tied	1016	± 3.0%
Fox News	November 16–19, 2015	Hillary Clinton	43%	Chris Christie	46%	3	1016	± 3.0%
Public Policy Polling	November 16–17, 2015	Hillary Clinton	43%	Jeb Bush	41%	2	1360	± 2.7%
Public Policy Polling	November 16–17, 2015	Hillary Clinton	46%	Ben Carson	45%	1	1360	± 2.7%
Public Policy Polling	November 16–17, 2015	Hillary Clinton	46%	Ted Cruz	44%	2	1360	± 2.7%
Public Policy Polling	November 16–17, 2015	Hillary Clinton	46%	Carly Fiorina	41%	5	1360	± 2.7%
Public Policy Polling	November 16–17, 2015	Hillary Clinton	43%	Marco Rubio	45%	2	1360	± 2.7%
Public Policy Polling	November 16–17, 2015	Hillary Clinton	45%	Donald Trump	44%	1	1360	± 2.7%
Public Policy Polling	November 16–17, 2015	Bernie Sanders	39%	Jeb Bush	42%	3	1360	± 2.7%
Public Policy Polling	November 16–17, 2015	Bernie Sanders	39%	Ben Carson	46%	7	1360	± 2.7%
Public Policy Polling	November 16–17, 2015	Bernie Sanders	39%	Ted Cruz	44%	5	1360	± 2.7%
Public Policy Polling	November 16–17, 2015	Bernie Sanders	40%	Carly Fiorina	42%	2	1360	± 2.7%
Public Policy Polling	November 16–17, 2015	Bernie Sanders	38%	Marco Rubio	44%	6	1360	± 2.7%
Public Policy Polling	November 16–17, 2015	Bernie Sanders	41%	Donald Trump	44%	3	1360	± 2.7%
McClatchy-Marist	October 29 – November 4, 2015	Hillary Clinton	56%	Donald Trump	41%	15	540	± 4.2%
McClatchy-Marist	October 29 – November 4, 2015	Hillary Clinton	50%	Ben Carson	48%	2	540	± 4.2%
McClatchy-Marist	October 29 – November 4, 2015	Hillary Clinton	50%	Marco Rubio	45%	5	540	± 4.2%
McClatchy-Marist	October 29 – November 4, 2015	Hillary Clinton	52%	Jeb Bush	44%	8	540	± 4.2%
McClatchy-Marist	October 29 – November 4, 2015	Hillary Clinton	53%	Ted Cruz	43%	10	540	± 4.2%
McClatchy-Marist	October 29 – November 4, 2015	Hillary Clinton	53%	Carly Fiorina	43%	10	540	± 4.2%
McClatchy-Marist	October 29 – November 4, 2015	Bernie Sanders	53%	Donald Trump	41%	12	540	± 4.2%
McClatchy-Marist	October 29 – November 4, 2015	Bernie Sanders	45%	Ben Carson	47%	2	540	± 4.2%
McClatchy-Marist	October 29 – November 4, 2015	Bernie Sanders	48%	Marco Rubio	45%	3	540	± 4.2%
McClatchy-Marist	October 29 – November 4, 2015	Bernie Sanders	51%	Jeb Bush	41%	10	540	± 4.2%
McClatchy-Marist	October 29 – November 4, 2015	Bernie Sanders	51%	Ted Cruz	39%	12	540	± 4.2%
McClatchy-Marist	October 29 – November 4, 2015	Bernie Sanders	53%	Carly Fiorina	39%	14	540	± 4.2%
Quinnipiac University	October 29 – November 2, 2015	Hillary Clinton	40%	Ben Carson	50%	10	1144	± 2.9%
Quinnipiac University	October 29 – November 2, 2015	Hillary Clinton	46%	Donald Trump	43%	3	1144	± 2.9%
Quinnipiac University	October 29 – November 2, 2015	Hillary Clinton	41%	Marco Rubio	46%	5	1144	± 2.9%
Quinnipiac University	October 29 – November 2, 2015	Hillary Clinton	43%	Ted Cruz	46%	3	1144	± 2.9%
Quinnipiac University	October 29 – November 2, 2015	Hillary Clinton	41%	Chris Christie	46%	5	1144	± 2.9%
Quinnipiac University	October 29 – November 2, 2015	Bernie Sanders	39%	Ben Carson	51%	12	1144	± 2.9%
Quinnipiac University	October 29 – November 2, 2015	Bernie Sanders	46%	Donald Trump	44%	2	1144	± 2.9%
Quinnipiac University	October 29 – November 2, 2015	Bernie Sanders	41%	Marco Rubio	47%	6	1144	± 2.9%
Quinnipiac University	October 29 – November 2, 2015	Bernie Sanders	44%	Ted Cruz	45%	1	1144	± 2.9%
Quinnipiac University	October 29 – November 2, 2015	Bernie Sanders	42%	Chris Christie	45%	3	1144	± 2.9%
Morning Consult	October 29 – November 1, 2015	Hillary Clinton	45%	Jeb Bush	39%	6	2350	± 2.0%
Morning Consult	October 29 – November 1, 2015	Hillary Clinton	47%	Rand Paul	37%	10	2350	± 2.0%
Morning Consult	October 29 – November 1, 2015	Hillary Clinton	43%	Ben Carson	44%	1	2350	± 2.0%
Morning Consult	October 29 – November 1, 2015	Hillary Clinton	45%	Marco Rubio	39%	6	2350	± 2.0%
Morning Consult	October 29 – November 1, 2015	Hillary Clinton	44%	Donald Trump	44%	Tied	2350	± 2.0%
Morning Consult	October 29 – November 1, 2015	Hillary Clinton	46%	Carly Fiorina	36%	10	2350	± 2.0%
Bay News 9/News 13/SurveyUSA	October 28 – November 1, 2015	Hillary Clinton	43%	Donald Trump	47%	4	2712	± 2.0%
Bay News 9/News 13/SurveyUSA	October 28 – November 1, 2015	Hillary Clinton	44%	Ben Carson	47%	3	2712	± 2.0%
Bay News 9/News 13/SurveyUSA	October 28 – November 1, 2015	Hillary Clinton	46%	Jeb Bush	44%	2	2712	± 2.0%
Bay News 9/News 13/SurveyUSA	October 28 – November 1, 2015	Hillary Clinton	46%	Marco Rubio	45%	1	2712	± 2.0%
Bay News 9/News 13/SurveyUSA	October 28 – November 1, 2015	Hillary Clinton	48%	Carly Fiorina	42%	6	2712	± 2.0%
Bay News 9/News 13/SurveyUSA	October 28 – November 1, 2015	Bernie Sanders	41%	Donald Trump	50%	9	2712	± 2.0%
Bay News 9/News 13/SurveyUSA	October 28 – November 1, 2015	Bernie Sanders	40%	Ben Carson	48%	8	2712	± 2.0%
Bay News 9/News 13/SurveyUSA	October 28 – November 1, 2015	Bernie Sanders	44%	Jeb Bush	46%	2	2712	± 2.0%
Bay News 9/News 13/SurveyUSA	October 28 – November 1, 2015	Bernie Sanders	44%	Marco Rubio	46%	2	2712	± 2.0%
Bay News 9/News 13/SurveyUSA	October 28 – November 1, 2015	Bernie Sanders	46%	Carly Fiorina	43%	3	2712	± 2.0%
NBC News/Wall Street Journal	October 25–29, 2015	Hillary Clinton	50%	Donald Trump	42%	8	847	± 3.4%
NBC News/Wall Street Journal	October 25–29, 2015	Hillary Clinton	47%	Ben Carson	47%	Tied	847	± 3.4%
NBC News/Wall Street Journal	October 25–29, 2015	Hillary Clinton	47%	Marco Rubio	42%	5	847	± 3.4%
NBC News/Wall Street Journal	October 25–29, 2015	Hillary Clinton	47%	Jeb Bush	43%	4	847	± 3.4%
NBC News/Wall Street Journal	October 25–29, 2015	Bernie Sanders	50%	Donald Trump	41%	9	847	± 3.4%
NBC News/Wall Street Journal	October 25–29, 2015	Bernie Sanders	46%	Marco Rubio	41%	5	847	± 3.4%
Hillary Clinton	50%	Jeb Bush	50%	Tied				
Hillary Clinton	50%	Marco Rubio	50%	Tied				
Hillary Clinton	53%	Rand Paul	47%	6				
Hillary Clinton	53%	Ted Cruz	47%	6				
Hillary Clinton	49%	Ben Carson	51%	2				
Hillary Clinton	52%	Carly Fiorina	48%	4				
Morning Consult	October 22–25, 2015	Hillary Clinton	41%	Jeb Bush	41%	Tied	1689	± 2.0%
Morning Consult	October 22–25, 2015	Hillary Clinton	44%	Rand Paul	38%	6	1689	± 2.0%
Morning Consult	October 22–25, 2015	Hillary Clinton	41%	Ben Carson	42%	1	1689	± 2.0%
Morning Consult	October 22–25, 2015	Hillary Clinton	43%	Marco Rubio	38%	5	1689	± 2.0%
Morning Consult	October 22–25, 2015	Hillary Clinton	43%	Donald Trump	43%	Tied	1689	± 2.0%
Morning Consult	October 22–25, 2015	Hillary Clinton	44%	Carly Fiorina	37%	7	1689	± 2.0%
Saint Leo University Polling Institute	October 17–22, 2015	Hillary Clinton	47%	Donald Trump	38%	9	1005	± 3.0%
Saint Leo University Polling Institute	October 17–22, 2015	Hillary Clinton	46%	Ben Carson	42%	4	1005	± 3.0%
Saint Leo University Polling Institute	October 17–22, 2015	Hillary Clinton	47%	Carly Fiorina	36%	11	1005	± 3.0%
Saint Leo University Polling Institute	October 17–22, 2015	Hillary Clinton	46%	Marco Rubio	39%	7	1005	± 3.0%
Saint Leo University Polling Institute	October 17–22, 2015	Hillary Clinton	45%	Jeb Bush	34%	11	1005	± 3.0%
Rasmussen Reports	October 18–19, 2015	Hillary Clinton	36%	Donald Trump	38%	2	1000	± 3%
Rasmussen Reports	October 18–19, 2015	Hillary Clinton	40%	Carly Fiorina	34%	6	1000	± 3%
Morning Consult	October 15–19, 2015	Hillary Clinton	46%	Jeb Bush	37%	9	2017	± 2.0%
Morning Consult	October 15–19, 2015	Hillary Clinton	48%	Rand Paul	35%	13	2017	± 2.0%
Morning Consult	October 15–19, 2015	Hillary Clinton	43%	Ben Carson	41%	2	2017	± 2.0%
Morning Consult	October 15–19, 2015	Hillary Clinton	47%	Marco Rubio	35%	12	2017	± 2.0%
Morning Consult	October 15–19, 2015	Hillary Clinton	44%	Donald Trump	41%	3	2017	± 2.0%
Morning Consult	October 15–19, 2015	Hillary Clinton	45%	Carly Fiorina	34%	11	2017	± 2.0%
NBC News/Wall Street Journal	October 15–18, 2015	Hillary Clinton	47%	Ben Carson	45%	2	400	± 4.9%
NBC News/Wall Street Journal	October 15–18, 2015	Hillary Clinton	46%	Marco Rubio	45%	1	400	± 4.9%
NBC News/Wall Street Journal	October 15–18, 2015	Hillary Clinton	49%	Ted Cruz	41%	8	400	± 4.9%
NBC News/Wall Street Journal	October 15–18, 2015	Bernie Sanders	44%	Ben Carson	43%	1	400	± 4.9%
NBC News/Wall Street Journal	October 15–18, 2015	Bernie Sanders	45%	Marco Rubio	41%	4	400	± 4.9%
NBC News/Wall Street Journal	October 15–18, 2015	Bernie Sanders	50%	Ted Cruz	38%	12	400	± 4.9%
Emerson College Polling Society	October 15–18, 2015	Hillary Clinton	43%	Jeb Bush	45%	2	783	± 3.4%
Emerson College Polling Society	October 15–18, 2015	Hillary Clinton	45%	Ben Carson	48%	3	783	± 3.4%
Emerson College Polling Society	October 15–18, 2015	Hillary Clinton	45%	Marco Rubio	44%	1	783	± 3.4%
Emerson College Polling Society	October 15–18, 2015	Hillary Clinton	44%	Donald Trump	46%	2	783	± 3.4%
Emerson College Polling Society	October 15–18, 2015	Bernie Sanders	42%	Donald Trump	46%	4	783	± 3.4%
Emerson College Polling Society	October 15–18, 2015	Hillary Clinton	45%	Carly Fiorina	44%	1	783	± 3.4%
CNN/ORC	October 14–17, 2015	Hillary Clinton	50%	Donald Trump	45%	5	956	± 3%
CNN/ORC	October 14–17, 2015	Hillary Clinton	47%	Ben Carson	48%	1	956	± 3%
CNN/ORC	October 14–17, 2015	Bernie Sanders	53%	Donald Trump	44%	9	956	± 3%
CNN/ORC	October 14–17, 2015	Bernie Sanders	46%	Ben Carson	48%	2	956	± 3%
CNN/ORC	October 14–17, 2015	Joe Biden	53%	Donald Trump	43%	10	956	± 3%
CNN/ORC	October 14–17, 2015	Joe Biden	52%	Ben Carson	44%	8	956	± 3%
Morning Consult	October 8–12, 2015	Hillary Clinton	41%	Jeb Bush	41%	Tied	2002	± 2%
Morning Consult	October 8–12, 2015	Hillary Clinton	43%	Rand Paul	37%	6	2002	± 2%
Morning Consult	October 8–12, 2015	Hillary Clinton	41%	Ben Carson	43%	2	2002	± 2%
Morning Consult	October 8–12, 2015	Hillary Clinton	43%	Marco Rubio	39%	4	2002	± 2%
Morning Consult	October 8–12, 2015	Hillary Clinton	43%	Donald Trump	41%	2	2002	± 2%
Morning Consult	October 8–12, 2015	Hillary Clinton	41%	Carly Fiorina	36%	5	2002	± 2%
Fox News	October 10–12, 2015	Hillary Clinton	39%	Carly Fiorina	42%	3	1004	± 3%
Fox News	October 10–12, 2015	Hillary Clinton	40%	Jeb Bush	42%	2	1004	± 3%
Fox News	October 10–12, 2015	Hillary Clinton	40%	Donald Trump	45%	5	1004	± 3%
Fox News	October 10–12, 2015	Hillary Clinton	39%	Ben Carson	50%	11	1004	± 3%
Fox News	October 10–12, 2015	Joe Biden	50%	Donald Trump	37%	13	1004	± 3%
Fox News	October 10–12, 2015	Joe Biden	46%	Jeb Bush	41%	5	1004	± 3%
Fox News	October 10–12, 2015	Joe Biden	46%	Carly Fiorina	42%	4	1004	± 3%
Fox News	October 10–12, 2015	Joe Biden	46%	Ben Carson	42%	4	1004	± 3%
Fox News	October 10–12, 2015	Joe Biden	44%	Marco Rubio	43%	1	1004	± 3%
Public Policy Polling	October 1–4, 2015	Hillary Clinton	42%	Jeb Bush	43%	1	1338	± 2.7%
Public Policy Polling	October 1–4, 2015	Hillary Clinton	44%	Ben Carson	48%	4	1338	± 2.7%
Public Policy Polling	October 1–4, 2015	Joe Biden	42%	Ben Carson	45%	3	1338	± 2.7%
Public Policy Polling	October 1–4, 2015	Bernie Sanders	35%	Ben Carson	46%	11	1338	± 2.7%
Public Policy Polling	October 1–4, 2015	Hillary Clinton	46%	Ted Cruz	42%	4	1338	± 2.7%
Public Policy Polling	October 1–4, 2015	Hillary Clinton	44%	Carly Fiorina	42%	1	1338	± 2.7%
Public Policy Polling	October 1–4, 2015	Joe Biden	46%	Carly Fiorina	40%	6	1338	± 2.7%
Public Policy Polling	October 1–4, 2015	Bernie Sanders	38%	Carly Fiorina	44%	6	1338	± 2.7%
Public Policy Polling	October 1–4, 2015	Hillary Clinton	46%	Mike Huckabee	39%	7	1338	± 2.7%
Public Policy Polling	October 1–4, 2015	Hillary Clinton	42%	John Kasich	39%	3	1338	± 2.7%
Public Policy Polling	October 1–4, 2015	Hillary Clinton	43%	Marco Rubio	43%	Tied	1338	± 2.7%
Public Policy Polling	October 1–4, 2015	Joe Biden	45%	Marco Rubio	40%	5	1338	± 2.7%
Public Policy Polling	October 1–4, 2015	Bernie Sanders	38%	Marco Rubio	42%	4	1338	± 2.7%
Public Policy Polling	October 1–4, 2015	Hillary Clinton	44%	Donald Trump	44%	Tied	1338	± 2.7%
Public Policy Polling	October 1–4, 2015	Joe Biden	48%	Donald Trump	40%	8	1338	± 2.7%
Public Policy Polling	October 1–4, 2015	Bernie Sanders	44%	Donald Trump	44%	Tied	1338	± 2.7%
NBC News/Wall Street Journal	September 20–24, 2015	Hillary Clinton	45%	Jeb Bush	44%	1	1000	± 3.10%
NBC News/Wall Street Journal	September 20–24, 2015	Hillary Clinton	49%	Donald Trump	39%	10	1000	± 3.10%
NBC News/Wall Street Journal	September 20–24, 2015	Hillary Clinton	45%	Ben Carson	46%	1	1000	± 3.10%
NBC News/Wall Street Journal	September 20–24, 2015	Hillary Clinton	44%	Carly Fiorina	45%	1	1000	± 3.10%
NBC News/Wall Street Journal	September 20–24, 2015	Joe Biden	48%	Jeb Bush	40%	8	1000	± 3.10%
NBC News/Wall Street Journal	September 20–24, 2015	Joe Biden	56%	Donald Trump	35%	21	1000	± 3.10%
NBC News/Wall Street Journal	September 20–24, 2015	Joe Biden	49%	Ben Carson	41%	8	1000	± 3.10%
NBC News/Wall Street Journal	September 20–24, 2015	Joe Biden	47%	Carly Fiorina	41%	6	1000	± 3.10%
NBC News/Wall Street Journal	September 20–24, 2015	Bernie Sanders	52%	Donald Trump	36%	16	1000	± 3.10%
Quinnipiac University	September 17–24, 2015	Hillary Clinton	42%	Jeb Bush	44%	2	1574	± 2.5%
Quinnipiac University	September 17–24, 2015	Hillary Clinton	42%	Ben Carson	49%	7	1574	± 2.5%
Quinnipiac University	September 17–24, 2015	Hillary Clinton	43%	Carly Fiorina	44%	1	1574	± 2.5%
Quinnipiac University	September 17–24, 2015	Hillary Clinton	45%	Donald Trump	43%	2	1574	± 2.5%
Quinnipiac University	September 17–24, 2015	Joe Biden	46%	Jeb Bush	41%	5	1574	± 2.5%
Quinnipiac University	September 17–24, 2015	Joe Biden	45%	Ben Carson	45%	Tied	1574	± 2.5%
Quinnipiac University	September 17–24, 2015	Joe Biden	46%	Carly Fiorina	43%	3	1574	± 2.5%
Quinnipiac University	September 17–24, 2015	Joe Biden	51%	Donald Trump	40%	11	1574	± 2.5%
Quinnipiac University	September 17–24, 2015	Bernie Sanders	44%	Jeb Bush	44%	Tied	1574	± 2.5%
Quinnipiac University	September 17–24, 2015	Bernie Sanders	39%	Ben Carson	49%	10	1574	± 2.5%
Quinnipiac University	September 17–24, 2015	Bernie Sanders	43%	Carly Fiorina	44%	1	1574	± 2.5%
Quinnipiac University	September 17–24, 2015	Bernie Sanders	47%	Donald Trump	42%	5	1574	± 2.5%
Fox News	September 20–22, 2015	Hillary Clinton	46%	Donald Trump	42%	4	1013	± 3%
MSNBC/Telemundo/Marist	August 26 – September 9, 2015	Hillary Clinton	50%	Marco Rubio	44%	6	1115	± 2.9%
MSNBC/Telemundo/Marist	August 26 – September 9, 2015	Hillary Clinton	53%	Donald Trump	40%	13	1115	± 2.9%
MSNBC/Telemundo/Marist	August 26 – September 9, 2015	Hillary Clinton	49%	Jeb Bush	45%	4	1115	± 2.9%
MSNBC/Telemundo/Marist	August 26 – September 9, 2015	Hillary Clinton	52%	Ted Cruz	41%	11	1115	± 2.9%
MSNBC/Telemundo/Marist	August 26 – September 9, 2015	Joe Biden	50%	Marco Rubio	42%	8	1115	± 2.9%
MSNBC/Telemundo/Marist	August 26 – September 9, 2015	Joe Biden	56%	Donald Trump	38%	18	1115	± 2.9%
MSNBC/Telemundo/Marist	August 26 – September 9, 2015	Joe Biden	50%	Jeb Bush	42%	8	1115	± 2.9%
MSNBC/Telemundo/Marist	August 26 – September 9, 2015	Joe Biden	54%	Ted Cruz	41%	13	1115	± 2.9%
ABC News/Washington Post	September 7–10, 2015	Hillary Clinton	46%	Donald Trump	43%	3	1003	± 4%
CNN/ORC	September 4–8, 2015	Hillary Clinton	47%	Jeb Bush	49%	2	1012	± 3%
CNN/ORC	September 4–8, 2015	Hillary Clinton	48%	Donald Trump	48%	Tied	1012	± 3%
CNN/ORC	September 4–8, 2015	Hillary Clinton	46%	Ben Carson	51%	5	1012	± 3%
CNN/ORC	September 4–8, 2015	Joe Biden	52%	Jeb Bush	44%	8	1012	± 3%
CNN/ORC	September 4–8, 2015	Joe Biden	54%	Donald Trump	44%	10	1012	± 3%
CNN/ORC	September 4–8, 2015	Joe Biden	47%	Ben Carson	50%	3	1012	± 3%
SurveyUSA	September 2–3, 2015	Hillary Clinton	40%	Donald Trump	45%	5	1000	± 3.3%
SurveyUSA	September 2–3, 2015	Bernie Sanders	40%	Donald Trump	44%	4	1000	± 3.3%
SurveyUSA	September 2–3, 2015	Joe Biden	42%	Donald Trump	44%	2	1000	± 3.3%
SurveyUSA	September 2–3, 2015	Al Gore	41%	Donald Trump	44%	3	1000	± 3.3%
Public Policy Polling	August 28–30, 2015	Hillary Clinton	44%	Ben Carson	44%	Tied	1254	± 2.8%
Public Policy Polling	August 28–30, 2015	Hillary Clinton	45%	Carly Fiorina	43%	2	1254	± 2.8%
Public Policy Polling	August 28–30, 2015	Hillary Clinton	46%	Donald Trump	44%	2	1254	± 2.8%
Public Policy Polling	August 28–30, 2015	Hillary Clinton	46%	Jeb Bush	42%	4	1254	± 2.8%
Public Policy Polling	August 28–30, 2015	Bernie Sanders	39%	Carly Fiorina	38%	1	1254	± 2.8%
Public Policy Polling	August 28–30, 2015	Bernie Sanders	42%	Donald Trump	43%	1	1254	± 2.8%
Public Policy Polling	August 28–30, 2015	Bernie Sanders	36%	Ben Carson	42%	6	1254	± 2.8%
Public Policy Polling	August 28–30, 2015	Bernie Sanders	40%	Jeb Bush	41%	1	1254	± 2.8%
Public Policy Polling	August 28–30, 2015	Joe Biden	47%	Donald Trump	41%	6	1254	± 2.8%
Public Policy Polling	August 28–30, 2015	Joe Biden	44%	Jeb Bush	41%	3	1254	± 2.8%
Fox News	August 11–13, 2015	Hillary Clinton	47%	Carly Fiorina	40%	7	1008	± 3.0%
Fox News	August 11–13, 2015	Hillary Clinton	47%	Donald Trump	42%	5	1008	± 3.0%
Fox News	August 11–13, 2015	Hillary Clinton	44%	Marco Rubio	46%	2	1008	± 3.0%
Fox News	August 11–13, 2015	Hillary Clinton	42%	Jeb Bush	44%	2	1008	± 3.0%
Morning Consult	August 7–9, 2015	Hillary Clinton	44%	Jeb Bush	41%	3	2029	± 2.0%
Morning Consult	August 7–9, 2015	Hillary Clinton	47%	Donald Trump	41%	6	2029	± 2.0%
Morning Consult	August 7–9, 2015	Hillary Clinton	48%	Scott Walker	35%	13	2029	± 2.0%
Morning Consult	August 7–9, 2015	Hillary Clinton	46%	Rand Paul	39%	7	2029	± 2.0%
Morning Consult	August 7–9, 2015	Hillary Clinton	46%	Marco Rubio	39%	7	2029	± 2.0%
Gravis Marketing	August 5, 2015	Hillary Clinton	50%	Donald Trump	50%	Tied	1535	2.5%
Gravis Marketing	August 5, 2015	Hillary Clinton	49%	Jeb Bush	51%	2	1535	2.5%
Gravis Marketing	August 5, 2015	Hillary Clinton	50%	Scott Walker	50%	Tied	1535	2.5%
Gravis Marketing	August 5, 2015	Hillary Clinton	52%	Marco Rubio	48%	4	1535	2.5%
Gravis Marketing	August 5, 2015	Hillary Clinton	53%	Rand Paul	47%	6	1535	2.5%
Gravis Marketing	August 5, 2015	Hillary Clinton	53%	Ted Cruz	47%	6	1535	2.5%
Gravis Marketing	August 5, 2015	Hillary Clinton	52%	Ben Carson	48%	4	1535	2.5%
Gravis Marketing	August 5, 2015	Hillary Clinton	52%	Rick Perry	48%	4	1535	2.5%
Gravis Marketing	August 5, 2015	Hillary Clinton	54%	Carly Fiorina	46%	8	1535	2.5%
McClatchy-Marist	July 22–28, 2015	Hillary Clinton	49%	Jeb Bush	43%	6	964	± 2.8%
McClatchy-Marist	July 22–28, 2015	Hillary Clinton	49%	Ben Carson	39%	10	964	± 2.8%
McClatchy-Marist	July 22–28, 2015	Hillary Clinton	50%	Chris Christie	40%	10	964	± 2.8%
McClatchy-Marist	July 22–28, 2015	Hillary Clinton	49%	Ted Cruz	40%	9	964	± 2.8%
McClatchy-Marist	July 22–28, 2015	Hillary Clinton	53%	Carly Fiorina	35%	18	964	± 2.8%
McClatchy-Marist	July 22–28, 2015	Hillary Clinton	53%	Jim Gilmore	32%	21	964	± 2.8%
McClatchy-Marist	July 22–28, 2015	Hillary Clinton	52%	Lindsey Graham	35%	17	964	± 2.8%
McClatchy-Marist	July 22–28, 2015	Hillary Clinton	50%	Mike Huckabee	41%	9	964	± 2.8%
McClatchy-Marist	July 22–28, 2015	Hillary Clinton	52%	Bobby Jindal	36%	16	964	± 2.8%
McClatchy-Marist	July 22–28, 2015	Hillary Clinton	49%	John Kasich	39%	10	964	± 2.8%
McClatchy-Marist	July 22–28, 2015	Hillary Clinton	50%	George Pataki	37%	13	964	± 2.8%
McClatchy-Marist	July 22–28, 2015	Hillary Clinton	48%	Rand Paul	43%	5	964	± 2.8%
McClatchy-Marist	July 22–28, 2015	Hillary Clinton	47%	Rick Perry	40%	7	964	± 2.8%
McClatchy-Marist	July 22–28, 2015	Hillary Clinton	47%	Marco Rubio	42%	5	964	± 2.8%
McClatchy-Marist	July 22–28, 2015	Hillary Clinton	51%	Rick Santorum	39%	12	964	± 2.8%
McClatchy-Marist	July 22–28, 2015	Hillary Clinton	54%	Donald Trump	38%	16	964	± 2.8%
McClatchy-Marist	July 22–28, 2015	Hillary Clinton	48%	Scott Walker	41%	7	964	± 2.8%
Quinnipiac University	July 23–28, 2015	Joe Biden	43%	Jeb Bush	42%	1	1,644	± 2.4%
Quinnipiac University	July 23–28, 2015	Joe Biden	49%	Donald Trump	37%	12	1,644	± 2.4%
Quinnipiac University	July 23–28, 2015	Joe Biden	43%	Scott Walker	43%	Tied	1,644	± 2.4%
Quinnipiac University	July 23–28, 2015	Hillary Clinton	41%	Jeb Bush	42%	1	1,644	± 2.4%
Quinnipiac University	July 23–28, 2015	Hillary Clinton	48%	Donald Trump	36%	12	1,644	± 2.4%
Quinnipiac University	July 23–28, 2015	Hillary Clinton	44%	Scott Walker	43%	1	1,644	± 2.4%
Quinnipiac University	July 23–28, 2015	Bernie Sanders	39%	Jeb Bush	44%	5	1,644	± 2.4%
Quinnipiac University	July 23–28, 2015	Bernie Sanders	45%	Donald Trump	37%	8	1,644	± 2.4%
Quinnipiac University	July 23–28, 2015	Bernie Sanders	37%	Scott Walker	42%	5	1,644	± 2.4%
CNN/ORC	July 22–25, 2015	Hillary Clinton	51%	Jeb Bush	46%	5	898	± 3.5%
CNN/ORC	July 22–25, 2015	Hillary Clinton	56%	Donald Trump	40%	16	898	± 3.5%
CNN/ORC	July 22–25, 2015	Hillary Clinton	53%	Scott Walker	44%	9	898	± 3.5%
CNN/ORC	July 22–25, 2015	Bernie Sanders	47%	Jeb Bush	48%	1	898	± 3.5%
CNN/ORC	July 22–25, 2015	Bernie Sanders	59%	Donald Trump	38%	21	898	± 3.5%
CNN/ORC	July 22–25, 2015	Bernie Sanders	48%	Scott Walker	43%	5	898	± 3.5%
Public Policy Polling	July 20–21, 2015	Hillary Clinton	46%	Jeb Bush	41%	5	1,087	± 3.0%
Public Policy Polling	July 20–21, 2015	Hillary Clinton	47%	Ben Carson	39%	8	1,087	± 3.0%
Public Policy Polling	July 20–21, 2015	Hillary Clinton	46%	Chris Christie	38%	8	1,087	± 3.0%
Public Policy Polling	July 20–21, 2015	Hillary Clinton	48%	Ted Cruz	40%	8	1,087	± 3.0%
Public Policy Polling	July 20–21, 2015	Hillary Clinton	47%	Carly Fiorina	37%	10	1,087	± 3.0%
Public Policy Polling	July 20–21, 2015	Hillary Clinton	46%	Mike Huckabee	40%	6	1,087	± 3.0%
Public Policy Polling	July 20–21, 2015	Hillary Clinton	45%	Rand Paul	42%	5	1,087	± 3.0%
Public Policy Polling	July 20–21, 2015	Hillary Clinton	46%	Marco Rubio	41%	5	1,087	± 3.0%
Public Policy Polling	July 20–21, 2015	Hillary Clinton	50%	Donald Trump	37%	13	1,087	± 3.0%
Public Policy Polling	July 20–21, 2015	Hillary Clinton	46%	Scott Walker	41%	5	1,087	± 3.0%
Public Policy Polling	July 20–21, 2015	Bernie Sanders	37%	Jeb Bush	44%	7	1,087	± 3.0%
Public Policy Polling	July 20–21, 2015	Bernie Sanders	36%	Marco Rubio	41%	5	1,087	± 3.0%
Public Policy Polling	July 20–21, 2015	Bernie Sanders	47%	Donald Trump	37%	10	1,087	± 3.0%
Public Policy Polling	July 20–21, 2015	Bernie Sanders	39%	Scott Walker	40%	1	1,087	± 3.0%
ABC News/Washington Post	July 16–19, 2015	Hillary Clinton	50%	Jeb Bush	44%	6	815	± 4.0%
CNN/ORC	June 26–28, 2015	Hillary Clinton	54%	Jeb Bush	41%	13	1,017	± 3.0%
CNN/ORC	June 26–28, 2015	Hillary Clinton	55%	Chris Christie	39%	16	1,017	± 3.0%
CNN/ORC	June 26–28, 2015	Hillary Clinton	56%	Marco Rubio	40%	16	1,017	± 3.0%
CNN/ORC	June 26–28, 2015	Hillary Clinton	59%	Donald Trump	35%	24	1,017	± 3.0%
CNN/ORC	June 26–28, 2015	Hillary Clinton	57%	Scott Walker	40%	17	1,017	± 3.0%
Zogby Analytics	June 23–25, 2015	Hillary Clinton	42%	Jeb Bush	33%	9	1,341	± ?
Zogby Analytics	June 23–25, 2015	Hillary Clinton	44%	Rand Paul	33%	9	1,341	± ?
Zogby Analytics	June 23–25, 2015	Hillary Clinton	43%	Marco Rubio	32%	11	1,341	± ?
Zogby Analytics	June 23–25, 2015	Hillary Clinton	43%	Scott Walker	33%	10	1,341	± ?
Fox News	June 21–23, 2015	Hillary Clinton	44%	Michael Bloomberg	38%	6	1,005	± 3.0%
Fox News	June 21–23, 2015	Hillary Clinton	43%	Jeb Bush	43%	Tied	1,005	± 3.0%
Fox News	June 21–23, 2015	Hillary Clinton	46%	Ben Carson	41%	5	1,005	± 3.0%
Fox News	June 21–23, 2015	Hillary Clinton	48%	Ted Cruz	42%	6	1,005	± 3.0%
Fox News	June 21–23, 2015	Hillary Clinton	45%	Carly Fiorina	39%	6	1,005	± 3.0%
Fox News	June 21–23, 2015	Hillary Clinton	46%	Rand Paul	42%	4	1,005	± 3.0%
Fox News	June 21–23, 2015	Hillary Clinton	48%	Mitt Romney	42%	6	1,005	± 3.0%
Fox News	June 21–23, 2015	Hillary Clinton	45%	Marco Rubio	44%	1	1,005	± 3.0%
Fox News	June 21–23, 2015	Hillary Clinton	48%	Donald Trump	42%	6	1,005	± 3.0%
Fox News	June 21–23, 2015	Hillary Clinton	47%	Scott Walker	41%	6	1,005	± 3.0%
NBC News/Wall Street Journal	June 14–18, 2015	Hillary Clinton	48%	Jeb Bush	40%	8	1,000	± 3.1%
NBC News/Wall Street Journal	June 14–18, 2015	Hillary Clinton	50%	Marco Rubio	40%	10	1,000	± 3.1%
NBC News/Wall Street Journal	June 14–18, 2015	Hillary Clinton	51%	Scott Walker	37%	14	1,000	± 3.1%
Public Policy Polling	June 11–14, 2015	Hillary Clinton	45%	Jeb Bush	41%	4	1,129	± 2.9%
Public Policy Polling	June 11–14, 2015	Hillary Clinton	46%	Ben Carson	43%	3	1,129	± 2.9%
Public Policy Polling	June 11–14, 2015	Hillary Clinton	45%	Chris Christie	41%	4	1,129	± 2.9%
Public Policy Polling	June 11–14, 2015	Hillary Clinton	48%	Ted Cruz	42%	6	1,129	± 2.9%
Public Policy Polling	June 11–14, 2015	Hillary Clinton	46%	Carly Fiorina	40%	6	1,129	± 2.9%
Public Policy Polling	June 11–14, 2015	Hillary Clinton	47%	Mike Huckabee	42%	5	1,129	± 2.9%
Public Policy Polling	June 11–14, 2015	Hillary Clinton	47%	Rand Paul	40%	7	1,129	± 2.9%
Public Policy Polling	June 11–14, 2015	Hillary Clinton	46%	Marco Rubio	43%	3	1,129	± 2.9%
Public Policy Polling	June 11–14, 2015	Hillary Clinton	46%	Scott Walker	42%	4	1,129	± 2.9%
Public Policy Polling	June 11–14, 2015	Lincoln Chafee	27%	Scott Walker	39%	12	1,129	± 2.9%
Public Policy Polling	June 11–14, 2015	Martin O'Malley	31%	Scott Walker	39%	8	1,129	± 2.9%
Public Policy Polling	June 11–14, 2015	Bernie Sanders	32%	Scott Walker	40%	8	1,129	± 2.9%
Public Policy Polling	June 11–14, 2015	Jim Webb	28%	Scott Walker	39%	11	1,129	± 2.9%
CNN/ORC	May 29–31, 2015	Hillary Clinton	51%	Jeb Bush	43%	8	1,025	± 3.0%
CNN/ORC	May 29–31, 2015	Hillary Clinton	52%	Ted Cruz	43%	9	1,025	± 3.0%
CNN/ORC	May 29–31, 2015	Hillary Clinton	48%	Rand Paul	47%	1	1,025	± 3.0%
CNN/ORC	May 29–31, 2015	Hillary Clinton	49%	Marco Rubio	46%	3	1,025	± 3.0%
CNN/ORC	May 29–31, 2015	Hillary Clinton	49%	Scott Walker	46%	3	1,025	± 3.0%
ABC News/Washington Post	May 28–31, 2015	Hillary Clinton	47%	Jeb Bush	44%	3	836	± 4.0%
Quinnipiac University	May 19–26, 2015	Hillary Clinton	47%	Jeb Bush	37%	10	1,711	± 2.4%
Quinnipiac University	May 19–26, 2015	Hillary Clinton	46%	Chris Christie	37%	9	1,711	± 2.4%
Quinnipiac University	May 19–26, 2015	Hillary Clinton	48%	Ted Cruz	37%	11	1,711	± 2.4%
Quinnipiac University	May 19–26, 2015	Hillary Clinton	47%	Mike Huckabee	40%	7	1,711	± 2.4%
Quinnipiac University	May 19–26, 2015	Hillary Clinton	46%	Rand Paul	42%	4	1,711	± 2.4%
Quinnipiac University	May 19–26, 2015	Hillary Clinton	45%	Marco Rubio	41%	4	1,711	± 2.4%
Quinnipiac University	May 19–26, 2015	Hillary Clinton	50%	Donald Trump	32%	18	1,711	± 2.4%
Quinnipiac University	May 19–26, 2015	Hillary Clinton	46%	Scott Walker	38%	8	1,711	± 2.4%
Fox News	May 9–12, 2015	Hillary Clinton	44%	Jeb Bush	45%	1	1,006	± 3%
Fox News	May 9–12, 2015	Hillary Clinton	48%	Ben Carson	42%	6	1,006	± 3%
Fox News	May 9–12, 2015	Hillary Clinton	48%	Ted Cruz	43%	5	1,006	± 3%
Fox News	May 9–12, 2015	Hillary Clinton	49%	Carly Fiorina	37%	12	1,006	± 3%
Fox News	May 9–12, 2015	Hillary Clinton	47%	Mike Huckabee	44%	3	1,006	± 3%
Fox News	May 9–12, 2015	Hillary Clinton	48%	John Kasich	40%	8	1,006	± 3%
Fox News	May 9–12, 2015	Hillary Clinton	47%	Marco Rubio	43%	4	1,006	± 3%
Fox News	May 9–12, 2015	Hillary Clinton	48%	Scott Walker	42%	6	1,006	± 3%
NBC News/Wall Street Journal	April 26–30, 2015	Hillary Clinton	49%	Jeb Bush	43%	6	1,000	± 3.1%
NBC News/Wall Street Journal	April 26–30, 2015	Hillary Clinton	47%	Rand Paul	44%	3	1,000	± 3.1%
NBC News/Wall Street Journal	April 26–30, 2015	Hillary Clinton	49%	Marco Rubio	43%	6	1,000	± 3.1%
NBC News/Wall Street Journal	April 26–30, 2015	Hillary Clinton	50%	Scott Walker	40%	10	1,000	± 3.1%
NBC News/Wall Street Journal	April 26–30, 2015	Joe Biden	40%	Jeb Bush	48%	8	1,000	± 3.1%
The Economist/YouGov	April 25–27, 2015	Hillary Clinton	46%	Jeb Bush	34%	12	854	± ?
The Economist/YouGov	April 25–27, 2015	Hillary Clinton	46%	Chris Christie	34%	12	854	± ?
The Economist/YouGov	April 25–27, 2015	Hillary Clinton	48%	Mike Huckabee	34%	14	854	± ?
Fox News	April 19–21, 2015	Hillary Clinton	45%	Jeb Bush	41%	4	1,012	± 3%
Fox News	April 19–21, 2015	Hillary Clinton	47%	Ted Cruz	42%	5	1,012	± 3%
Fox News	April 19–21, 2015	Hillary Clinton	46%	Rand Paul	43%	3	1,012	± 3%
Fox News	April 19–21, 2015	Hillary Clinton	46%	Marco Rubio	42%	4	1,012	± 3%
Fox News	April 19–21, 2015	Hillary Clinton	46%	Scott Walker	40%	6	1,012	± 3%
Quinnipiac University	April 16–21, 2015	Hillary Clinton	46%	Jeb Bush	39%	7	1,353	± 2.7%
Quinnipiac University	April 16–21, 2015	Hillary Clinton	45%	Chris Christie	40%	5	1,353	± 2.7%
Quinnipiac University	April 16–21, 2015	Hillary Clinton	48%	Ted Cruz	41%	7	1,353	± 2.7%
Quinnipiac University	April 16–21, 2015	Hillary Clinton	47%	Mike Huckabee	42%	5	1,353	± 2.7%
Quinnipiac University	April 16–21, 2015	Hillary Clinton	46%	Rand Paul	42%	4	1,353	± 2.7%
Quinnipiac University	April 16–21, 2015	Hillary Clinton	45%	Marco Rubio	43%	2	1,353	± 2.7%
Quinnipiac University	April 16–21, 2015	Hillary Clinton	46%	Scott Walker	41%	5	1,353	± 2.7%
CNN/ORC	April 16–19, 2015	Hillary Clinton	56%	Jeb Bush	39%	17	1,018	± 3%
CNN/ORC	April 16–19, 2015	Hillary Clinton	60%	Ben Carson	36%	24	1,018	± 3%
CNN/ORC	April 16–19, 2015	Hillary Clinton	58%	Chris Christie	39%	19	1,018	± 3%
CNN/ORC	April 16–19, 2015	Hillary Clinton	60%	Ted Cruz	36%	24	1,018	± 3%
CNN/ORC	April 16–19, 2015	Hillary Clinton	58%	Mike Huckabee	37%	21	1,018	± 3%
CNN/ORC	April 16–19, 2015	Hillary Clinton	58%	Rand Paul	39%	19	1,018	± 3%
CNN/ORC	April 16–19, 2015	Hillary Clinton	55%	Marco Rubio	41%	14	1,018	± 3%
CNN/ORC	April 16–19, 2015	Hillary Clinton	59%	Scott Walker	37%	22	1,018	± 3%
Rasmussen Reports	April 9 & 12, 2015	Hillary Clinton	47%	Ted Cruz	38%	9	1,000	± 3%
Rasmussen Reports	April 9 & 12, 2015	Hillary Clinton	47%	Rand Paul	37%	10	1,000	± 3%
Fox News	March 29–31, 2015	Hillary Clinton	45%	Jeb Bush	45%	Tied	1,025	± 3%
Fox News	March 29–31, 2015	Hillary Clinton	48%	Ted Cruz	42%	6	1,025	± 3%
Fox News	March 29–31, 2015	Hillary Clinton	47%	Rand Paul	45%	2	1,025	± 3%
Fox News	March 29–31, 2015	Hillary Clinton	47%	Marco Rubio	43%	4	1,025	± 3%
Fox News	March 29–31, 2015	Hillary Clinton	48%	Scott Walker	42%	6	1,025	± 3%
Public Policy Polling	March 26–31, 2015	Hillary Clinton	46%	Jeb Bush	40%	6	989	± 3.1%
Public Policy Polling	March 26–31, 2015	Hillary Clinton	47%	Ben Carson	42%	5	989	± 3.1%
Public Policy Polling	March 26–31, 2015	Hillary Clinton	46%	Chris Christie	37%	9	989	± 3.1%
Public Policy Polling	March 26–31, 2015	Hillary Clinton	49%	Ted Cruz	43%	6	989	± 3.1%
Public Policy Polling	March 26–31, 2015	Hillary Clinton	48%	Mike Huckabee	41%	7	989	± 3.1%
Public Policy Polling	March 26–31, 2015	Hillary Clinton	46%	Rand Paul	42%	4	989	± 3.1%
Public Policy Polling	March 26–31, 2015	Hillary Clinton	48%	Rick Perry	39%	9	989	± 3.1%
Public Policy Polling	March 26–31, 2015	Hillary Clinton	46%	Marco Rubio	43%	3	989	± 3.1%
Public Policy Polling	March 26–31, 2015	Hillary Clinton	46%	Scott Walker	42%	4	989	± 3.1%
Public Policy Polling	March 26–31, 2015	Joe Biden	40%	Scott Walker	46%	6	989	± 3.1%
Public Policy Polling	March 26–31, 2015	Elizabeth Warren	39%	Scott Walker	43%	4	989	± 3.1%
ABC News/Washington Post	March 26–29, 2015	Hillary Clinton	53%	Jeb Bush	41%	12	?	± 4%
ABC News/Washington Post	March 26–29, 2015	Hillary Clinton	56%	Ted Cruz	39%	17	?	± 4%
ABC News/Washington Post	March 26–29, 2015	Hillary Clinton	54%	Marco Rubio	39%	15	?	± 4%
ABC News/Washington Post	March 26–29, 2015	Hillary Clinton	54%	Scott Walker	40%	14	?	± 4%
CNN/ORC	March 13–15, 2015	Hillary Clinton	55%	Jeb Bush	40%	15	1,009	± 3%
CNN/ORC	March 13–15, 2015	Hillary Clinton	56%	Ben Carson	40%	16	1,009	± 3%
CNN/ORC	March 13–15, 2015	Hillary Clinton	55%	Chris Christie	40%	15	1,009	± 3%
CNN/ORC	March 13–15, 2015	Hillary Clinton	55%	Mike Huckabee	41%	14	1,009	± 3%
CNN/ORC	March 13–15, 2015	Hillary Clinton	54%	Rand Paul	43%	11	1,009	± 3%
CNN/ORC	March 13–15, 2015	Hillary Clinton	55%	Marco Rubio	42%	13	1,009	± 3%
CNN/ORC	March 13–15, 2015	Hillary Clinton	55%	Scott Walker	40%	15	1,009	± 3%
McClatchy-Marist	March 1–4, 2015	Hillary Clinton	49%	Jeb Bush	42%	7	1,036	± 3%
McClatchy-Marist	March 1–4, 2015	Hillary Clinton	53%	Ted Cruz	39%	14	1,036	± 3%
McClatchy-Marist	March 1–4, 2015	Hillary Clinton	51%	Rand Paul	40%	11	1,036	± 3%
McClatchy-Marist	March 1–4, 2015	Hillary Clinton	51%	Rick Perry	42%	9	1,036	± 3%
McClatchy-Marist	March 1–4, 2015	Hillary Clinton	49%	Marco Rubio	42%	7	1,036	± 3%
McClatchy-Marist	March 1–4, 2015	Hillary Clinton	48%	Scott Walker	44%	4	1,036	± 3%
Quinnipiac University	February 26 – March 2, 2015	Hillary Clinton	45%	Jeb Bush	42%	3	1,286	± 2.7%
Quinnipiac University	February 26 – March 2, 2015	Hillary Clinton	46%	Chris Christie	39%	7	1,286	± 2.7%
Quinnipiac University	February 26 – March 2, 2015	Hillary Clinton	48%	Ted Cruz	38%	10	1,286	± 2.7%
Quinnipiac University	February 26 – March 2, 2015	Hillary Clinton	47%	Mike Huckabee	40%	7	1,286	± 2.7%
Quinnipiac University	February 26 – March 2, 2015	Hillary Clinton	47%	Rand Paul	41%	6	1,286	± 2.7%
Quinnipiac University	February 26 – March 2, 2015	Hillary Clinton	46%	Marco Rubio	41%	5	1,286	± 2.7%
Quinnipiac University	February 26 – March 2, 2015	Hillary Clinton	48%	Scott Walker	39%	9	1,286	± 2.7%
Rasmussen Reports	February 28 – March 1, 2015	Hillary Clinton	45%	Jeb Bush	36%	9	1,000	± 3%
Rasmussen Reports	February 28 – March 1, 2015	Hillary Clinton	47%	Ben Carson	36%	11	1,000	± 3%
Rasmussen Reports	February 28 – March 1, 2015	Hillary Clinton	46%	Scott Walker	41%	5	1,000	± 3%
Public Policy Polling	February 20–22, 2015	Hillary Clinton	50%	Jeb Bush	40%	10	691	± 3.7%
Public Policy Polling	February 20–22, 2015	Hillary Clinton	48%	Ben Carson	40%	8	691	± 3.7%
Public Policy Polling	February 20–22, 2015	Hillary Clinton	48%	Chris Christie	40%	8	691	± 3.7%
Public Policy Polling	February 20–22, 2015	Hillary Clinton	50%	Ted Cruz	40%	10	691	± 3.7%
Public Policy Polling	February 20–22, 2015	Hillary Clinton	50%	Mike Huckabee	41%	9	691	± 3.7%
Public Policy Polling	February 20–22, 2015	Hillary Clinton	47%	Rand Paul	40%	7	691	± 3.7%
Public Policy Polling	February 20–22, 2015	Hillary Clinton	48%	Rick Perry	41%	7	691	± 3.7%
Public Policy Polling	February 20–22, 2015	Hillary Clinton	48%	Marco Rubio	41%	7	691	± 3.7%
Public Policy Polling	February 20–22, 2015	Hillary Clinton	48%	Scott Walker	40%	8	691	± 3.7%
Public Policy Polling	February 20–22, 2015	Joe Biden	39%	Jeb Bush	45%	6	691	± 3.7%
Public Policy Polling	February 20–22, 2015	Elizabeth Warren	41%	Jeb Bush	43%	2	691	± 3.7%
Fox News	January 25–27, 2015	Hillary Clinton	48%	Jeb Bush	43%	5	1,009	± 3%
Fox News	January 25–27, 2015	Hillary Clinton	48%	Chris Christie	42%	6	1,009	± 3%
Fox News	January 25–27, 2015	Hillary Clinton	47%	Rand Paul	44%	3	1,009	± 3%
Fox News	January 25–27, 2015	Hillary Clinton	46%	Mitt Romney	46%	Tied	1,009	± 3%
Public Policy Polling	January 20–21, 2015	Hillary Clinton	45%	Jeb Bush	41%	4	861	± ?
Public Policy Polling	January 20–21, 2015	Hillary Clinton	45%	Chris Christie	40%	5	861	± ?
Public Policy Polling	January 20–21, 2015	Hillary Clinton	46%	Rand Paul	39%	7	861	± ?
Public Policy Polling	January 20–21, 2015	Hillary Clinton	47%	Mitt Romney	43%	4	861	± ?
Public Policy Polling	January 20–21, 2015	Hillary Clinton	45%	Scott Walker	42%	3	861	± ?
ABC News/Washington Post	January 12–15, 2015	Hillary Clinton	54%	Jeb Bush	41%	13	843	± 4%
ABC News/Washington Post	January 12–15, 2015	Hillary Clinton	53%	Chris Christie	40%	13	843	± 4%
ABC News/Washington Post	January 12–15, 2015	Hillary Clinton	56%	Mike Huckabee	39%	17	843	± 4%
ABC News/Washington Post	January 12–15, 2015	Hillary Clinton	54%	Rand Paul	41%	13	843	± 4%
ABC News/Washington Post	January 12–15, 2015	Hillary Clinton	55%	Mitt Romney	40%	15	843	± 4%
The Economist/YouGov	January 10–12, 2015	Hillary Clinton	43%	Jeb Bush	32%	11	1,000	± 4.8%
Greenberg Quinlan Roser Research	January 5–11, 2015	Hillary Clinton	52%	Jeb Bush	40%	12	950	± 3.2%
Greenberg Quinlan Roser Research	January 5–11, 2015	Hillary Clinton	49%	Mitt Romney	43%	6	950	± 3.2%

==== Polls conducted in 2014 ====
Polls in 2014

Poll source	Date	Democratic candidate	%	Republican candidate	%	Leading by %	Sample Size	Margin of error
CNN/ORC	December 18–21	Hillary Clinton	54%	Jeb Bush	41%	13	1,011	± 3%
CNN/ORC	December 18–21	Hillary Clinton	56%	Ben Carson	35%	21	1,011	± 3%
CNN/ORC	December 18–21	Hillary Clinton	56%	Chris Christie	39%	17	1,011	± 3%
CNN/ORC	December 18–21	Hillary Clinton	60%	Ted Cruz	35%	25	1,011	± 3%
CNN/ORC	December 18–21	Hillary Clinton	59%	Mike Huckabee	38%	21	1,011	± 3%
CNN/ORC	December 18–21	Hillary Clinton	58%	Rand Paul	38%	20	1,011	± 3%
CNN/ORC	December 18–21	Hillary Clinton	56%	Paul Ryan	41%	15	1,011	± 3%
Fox News	December 7–9	Hillary Clinton	49%	Jeb Bush	42%	7	1,043	± 3%
Fox News	December 7–9	Hillary Clinton	52%	Chris Christie	40%	12	1,043	± 3%
Fox News	December 7–9	Hillary Clinton	53%	John Kasich	37%	16	1,043	± 3%
Fox News	December 7–9	Hillary Clinton	51%	Rand Paul	40%	11	1,043	± 3%
McClatchy-Marist	December 3–9	Hillary Clinton	53%	Jeb Bush	40%	13	923	± 3.2%
McClatchy-Marist	December 3–9	Hillary Clinton	53%	Chris Christie	41%	12	923	± 3.2%
McClatchy-Marist	December 3–9	Hillary Clinton	54%	Rand Paul	40%	14	923	± 3.2%
McClatchy-Marist	December 3–9	Hillary Clinton	53%	Mitt Romney	41%	12	923	± 3.2%
Bloomberg Politics/Selzer & Co.	December 3–5	Hillary Clinton	43%	Jeb Bush	37%	6	753	± 3.6%
Bloomberg Politics/Selzer & Co.	December 3–5	Hillary Clinton	42%	Chris Christie	36%	6	753	± 3.6%
Bloomberg Politics/Selzer & Co.	December 3–5	Hillary Clinton	46%	Ted Cruz	33%	13	753	± 3.6%
Bloomberg Politics/Selzer & Co.	December 3–5	Hillary Clinton	45%	Rand Paul	37%	8	753	± 3.6%
Bloomberg Politics/Selzer & Co.	December 3–5	Hillary Clinton	45%	Mitt Romney	39%	6	753	± 3.6%
Quinnipiac University	November 18–23	Hillary Clinton	46%	Jeb Bush	41%	5	1,623	± 2.4%
Quinnipiac University	November 18–23	Hillary Clinton	43%	Chris Christie	42%	1	1,623	± 2.4%
Quinnipiac University	November 18–23	Hillary Clinton	48%	Ted Cruz	37%	11	1,623	± 2.4%
Quinnipiac University	November 18–23	Hillary Clinton	46%	Mike Huckabee	41%	5	1,623	± 2.4%
Quinnipiac University	November 18–23	Hillary Clinton	46%	Rand Paul	41%	5	1,623	± 2.4%
Quinnipiac University	November 18–23	Hillary Clinton	44%	Mitt Romney	45%	1	1,623	± 2.4%
Quinnipiac University	November 18–23	Hillary Clinton	46%	Paul Ryan	42%	4	1,623	± 2.4%
McClatchy-Marist	September 24–29	Hillary Clinton	53%	Jeb Bush	42%	11	884	± 3.3%
McClatchy-Marist	September 24–29	Hillary Clinton	51%	Chris Christie	42%	11	884	± 3.3%
McClatchy-Marist	September 24–29	Hillary Clinton	52%	Rand Paul	43%	9	884	± 3.3%
McClatchy-Marist	August 4–7	Hillary Clinton	48%	Jeb Bush	41%	7	806	± 3.5%
McClatchy-Marist	August 4–7	Hillary Clinton	47%	Chris Christie	41%	6	806	± 3.5%
McClatchy-Marist	August 4–7	Hillary Clinton	48%	Rand Paul	42%	6	806	± 3.5%
Fox News	July 20–22	Hillary Clinton	52%	Jeb Bush	39%	13	1,057	± 3%
Fox News	July 20–22	Hillary Clinton	50%	Chris Christie	40%	10	1,057	± 3%
Fox News	July 20–22	Hillary Clinton	54%	John Kasich	35%	19	1,057	± 3%
Fox News	July 20–22	Hillary Clinton	52%	Rand Paul	41%	11	1,057	± 3%
CNN/ORC	July 18–20	Hillary Clinton	55%	Mitt Romney	42%	13	899	± 3%
Quinnipiac University	June 24–30	Hillary Clinton	48%	Jeb Bush	41%	7	1,446	± 2.6%
Quinnipiac University	June 24–30	Hillary Clinton	47%	Chris Christie	38%	9	1,446	± 2.6%
Quinnipiac University	June 24–30	Hillary Clinton	49%	Mike Huckabee	40%	9	1,446	± 2.6%
Quinnipiac University	June 24–30	Hillary Clinton	49%	Rand Paul	40%	9	1,446	± 2.6%
Quinnipiac University	June 24–30	Hillary Clinton	48%	Paul Ryan	41%	7	1,446	± 2.6%
Rasmussen	June 14–17 & 20–21	Hillary Clinton	45%	Ben Carson	38%	7	1,000	± 3%
Rasmussen	June 14–17 & 20–21	Hillary Clinton	47%	Chris Christie	33%	14	1,000	± 3%
Rasmussen	June 14–17 & 20–21	Hillary Clinton	50%	Ted Cruz	37%	13	1,000	± 3%
Rasmussen	June 14–17 & 20–21	Hillary Clinton	46%	Rand Paul	39%	7	1,000	± 3%
Rasmussen	June 14–17 & 20–21	Hillary Clinton	50%	Rick Perry	36%	14	1,000	± 3%
Rasmussen	June 14–17 & 20–21	Hillary Clinton	47%	Marco Rubio	36%	11	1,000	± 3%
Bloomberg Politics/Selzer & Co.	June 6–9	Hillary Clinton	47%	Jeb Bush	38%	9	723	
Bloomberg Politics/Selzer & Co.	June 6–9	Hillary Clinton	45%	Chris Christie	38%	7	723	
Bloomberg Politics/Selzer & Co.	June 6–9	Hillary Clinton	47%	Rand Paul	38%	9	723	
Bloomberg Politics/Selzer & Co.	June 6–9	Hillary Clinton	47%	Marco Rubio	36%	11	723	
Saint Leo University	May 28 – June 4	Hillary Clinton	53%	Jeb Bush	35%	18	802	± 3.5%
Saint Leo University	May 28 – June 4	Hillary Clinton	52%	Chris Christie	34%	18	802	± 3.5%
Saint Leo University	May 28 – June 4	Hillary Clinton	54%	Ted Cruz	30%	24	802	± 3.5%
Saint Leo University	May 28 – June 4	Hillary Clinton	55%	Rand Paul	34%	21	802	± 3.5%
Saint Leo University	May 28 – June 4	Hillary Clinton	54%	Paul Ryan	33%	21	802	± 3.5%
Saint Leo University	May 28 – June 4	Hillary Clinton	53%	Marco Rubio	31%	22	802	± 3.5%
ABC News/Washington Post	May 29 – June 1	Hillary Clinton	53%	Rand Paul	43%	10	1,002	± 3.5%
Public Policy Polling	June 2	Hillary Clinton	49%	Marco Rubio	42%	7	735	± 3.6%
ABC News/Washington Post	April 24–27	Hillary Clinton	53%	Jeb Bush	41%	12	855	± 3.5%
Fairleigh Dickinson University	April 21–27	Hillary Clinton	49%	Jeb Bush	33%	16	1,051	± 3%
Fairleigh Dickinson University	April 21–27	Hillary Clinton	46%	Chris Christie	36%	10	1,051	± 3%
Fairleigh Dickinson University	April 21–27	Hillary Clinton	49%	Mike Huckabee	36%	13	1,051	± 3%
Fairleigh Dickinson University	April 21–27	Hillary Clinton	48%	Rand Paul	37%	11	1,051	± 3%
Fairleigh Dickinson University	April 21–27	Hillary Clinton	46%	Paul Ryan	38%	8	1,051	± 3%
Fox News	April 13–15	Hillary Clinton	51%	Jeb Bush	42%	9	1,012	± 3%
Fox News	April 13–15	Hillary Clinton	50%	Chris Christie	42%	8	1,012	± 3%
Fox News	April 13–15	Hillary Clinton	51%	Rand Paul	42%	9	1,012	± 3%
McClatchy-Marist	April 7–10	Hillary Clinton	55%	Jeb Bush	39%	16	1,036	± 3%
McClatchy-Marist	April 7–10	Hillary Clinton	53%	Chris Christie	42%	11	1,036	± 3%
McClatchy-Marist	April 7–10	Hillary Clinton	54%	Ted Cruz	39%	15	1,036	± 3%
McClatchy-Marist	April 7–10	Hillary Clinton	53%	Mike Huckabee	40%	13	1,036	± 3%
McClatchy-Marist	April 7–10	Hillary Clinton	54%	Rand Paul	40%	14	1,036	± 3%
McClatchy-Marist	April 7–10	Hillary Clinton	54%	Marco Rubio	38%	16	1,036	± 3%
McClatchy-Marist	April 7–10	Hillary Clinton	51%	Paul Ryan	43%	8	1,036	± 3%
Public Policy Polling	March 6–9	Hillary Clinton	47%	Jeb Bush	44%	3	1,152	± 2.9%
Public Policy Polling	March 6–9	Hillary Clinton	46%	Chris Christie	42%	4	1,152	± 2.9%
Public Policy Polling	March 6–9	Hillary Clinton	51%	Ted Cruz	40%	11	1,152	± 2.9%
Public Policy Polling	March 6–9	Hillary Clinton	49%	Mike Huckabee	42%	7	1,152	± 2.9%
Public Policy Polling	March 6–9	Hillary Clinton	47%	Rand Paul	42%	5	1,152	± 2.9%
Public Policy Polling	March 6–9	Hillary Clinton	48%	Mitt Romney	43%	5	1,152	± 2.9%
Public Policy Polling	March 6–9	Hillary Clinton	48%	Marco Rubio	40%	8	1,152	± 2.9%
Public Policy Polling	March 6–9	Hillary Clinton	48%	Paul Ryan	43%	5	1,152	± 2.9%
Public Policy Polling	March 6–9	Joe Biden	41%	Mike Huckabee	46%	5	1,152	± 2.9%
Public Policy Polling	March 6–9	Elizabeth Warren	33%	Mike Huckabee	44%	11	1,152	± 2.9%
Bloomberg Politics/Selzer & Co.	March 7–10	Hillary Clinton	52%	Chris Christie	39%	13	678	± >3.1%
Rasmussen	March 4–5	Hillary Clinton	47%	Jeb Bush	33%	14	1,000	± 3%
Fox News	March 2–4	Hillary Clinton	51%	Jeb Bush	38%	13	1,002	± 3%
Fox News	March 2–4	Hillary Clinton	49%	Chris Christie	38%	11	1,002	± 3%
Fox News	March 2–4	Hillary Clinton	52%	Ted Cruz	36%	16	1,002	± 3%
McClatchy-Marist	February 4–9	Hillary Clinton	58%	Jeb Bush	38%	20	970	± 3.1%
McClatchy-Marist	February 4–9	Hillary Clinton	58%	Chris Christie	37%	21	970	± 3.1%
McClatchy-Marist	February 4–9	Hillary Clinton	56%	Ted Cruz	39%	17	970	± 3.1%
McClatchy-Marist	February 4–9	Hillary Clinton	55%	Mike Huckabee	41%	14	970	± 3.1%
McClatchy-Marist	February 4–9	Hillary Clinton	62%	Sarah Palin	35%	27	970	± 3.1%
McClatchy-Marist	February 4–9	Hillary Clinton	58%	Rand Paul	38%	20	970	± 3.1%
McClatchy-Marist	February 4–9	Hillary Clinton	53%	Mitt Romney	44%	9	970	± 3.1%
McClatchy-Marist	February 4–9	Hillary Clinton	58%	Marco Rubio	37%	21	970	± 3.1%
McClatchy-Marist	February 4–9	Hillary Clinton	52%	Paul Ryan	44%	8	970	± 3.1%
CNN/ORC	January 31 – February 2	Hillary Clinton	57%	Jeb Bush	37%	20	900	± 3.5%
CNN/ORC	January 31 – February 2	Hillary Clinton	55%	Chris Christie	39%	16	900	± 3.5%
CNN/ORC	January 31 – February 2	Hillary Clinton	56%	Mike Huckabee	39%	16	900	± 3.5%
CNN/ORC	January 31 – February 2	Hillary Clinton	57%	Rand Paul	39%	18	900	± 3.5%
CNN/ORC	January 31 – February 2	Hillary Clinton	55%	Paul Ryan	40%	15	900	± 3.5%
Public Policy Polling	January 23–26	Hillary Clinton	45%	Jeb Bush	43%	2	845	± 3.4%
Public Policy Polling	January 23–26	Hillary Clinton	45%	Chris Christie	43%	2	845	± 3.4%
Public Policy Polling	January 23–26	Hillary Clinton	47%	Ted Cruz	41%	6	845	± 3.4%
Public Policy Polling	January 23–26	Hillary Clinton	46%	Mike Huckabee	43%	3	845	± 3.4%
Public Policy Polling	January 23–26	Hillary Clinton	46%	Rand Paul	43%	3	845	± 3.4%
Public Policy Polling	January 23–26	Hillary Clinton	46%	Paul Ryan	44%	2	845	± 3.4%
Public Policy Polling	January 23–26	Joe Biden	35%	Chris Christie	46%	11	845	± 3.4%
Public Policy Polling	January 23–26	Elizabeth Warren	34%	Chris Christie	43%	9	845	± 3.4%
ABC News/Washington Post	January 20–23	Hillary Clinton	53%	Chris Christie	41%	12	873	± 3.5%
Quinnipiac University	January 15–19	Hillary Clinton	49%	Jeb Bush	38%	11	1,933	± 2.2%
Quinnipiac University	January 15–19	Hillary Clinton	46%	Chris Christie	38%	8	1,933	± 2.2%
Quinnipiac University	January 15–19	Hillary Clinton	50%	Ted Cruz	35%	15	1,933	± 2.2%
Quinnipiac University	January 15–19	Hillary Clinton	49%	Rand Paul	39%	10	1,933	± 2.2%
NBC News/Marist Poll	January 12–14	Hillary Clinton	50%	Chris Christie	37%	13	1,039	± 3%

==== Polls conducted in 2013 ====
Polls in 2013

Poll source	Date	Democratic candidate	%	Republican candidate	%	Leading by %	Sample Size	Margin of error
CNN/ORC	December 16–19	Hillary Clinton	58%	Jeb Bush	37%	21	950	± 3%
CNN/ORC	December 16–19	Hillary Clinton	46%	Chris Christie	48%	2	950	± 3%
CNN/ORC	December 16–19	Hillary Clinton	57%	Ted Cruz	39%	19	950	± 3%
CNN/ORC	December 16–19	Hillary Clinton	55%	Mike Huckabee	40%	15	950	± 3%
CNN/ORC	December 16–19	Hillary Clinton	54%	Rand Paul	41%	13	950	± 3%
CNN/ORC	December 16–19	Hillary Clinton	56%	Rick Perry	39%	17	950	± 3%
CNN/ORC	December 16–19	Hillary Clinton	56%	Marco Rubio	37%	19	950	± 3%
CNN/ORC	December 16–19	Hillary Clinton	52%	Paul Ryan	44%	8	950	± 3%
CNN/ORC	December 16–19	Hillary Clinton	57%	Rick Santorum	38%	19	950	± 3%
Public Policy Polling	December 12–15	Hillary Clinton	48%	Jeb Bush	43%	5	1,316	± 2.7%
Public Policy Polling	December 12–15	Hillary Clinton	42%	Chris Christie	45%	3	1,316	± 2.7%
Public Policy Polling	December 12–15	Hillary Clinton	49%	Ted Cruz	41%	8	1,316	± 2.7%
Public Policy Polling	December 12–15	Hillary Clinton	48%	Mike Huckabee	42%	6	1,316	± 2.7%
Public Policy Polling	December 12–15	Hillary Clinton	48%	Rand Paul	43%	5	1,316	± 2.7%
Public Policy Polling	December 12–15	Joe Biden	35%	Chris Christie	49%	14	1,316	± 2.7%
Public Policy Polling	December 12–15	Howard Dean	29%	Chris Christie	51%	22	1,316	± 2.7%
Public Policy Polling	December 12–15	John Kerry	35%	Chris Christie	46%	11	1,316	± 2.7%
Public Policy Polling	December 12–15	Elizabeth Warren	33%	Chris Christie	49%	16	1,316	± 2.7%
Quinnipiac University	December 3–9	Hillary Clinton	48%	Jeb Bush	39%	9	2,692	± 1.9%
Quinnipiac University	December 3–9	Hillary Clinton	41%	Chris Christie	42%	1	2,692	± 1.9%
Quinnipiac University	December 3–9	Hillary Clinton	50%	Ted Cruz	37%	13	2,692	± 1.9%
Quinnipiac University	December 3–9	Hillary Clinton	48%	Rand Paul	41%	7	2,692	± 1.9%
McClatchy-Marist	December 3–5	Hillary Clinton	53%	Jeb Bush	41%	12	1,173	± 2.9%
McClatchy-Marist	December 3–5	Hillary Clinton	48%	Chris Christie	45%	3	1,173	± 2.9%
McClatchy-Marist	December 3–5	Hillary Clinton	57%	Ted Cruz	35%	22	1,173	± 2.9%
McClatchy-Marist	December 3–5	Hillary Clinton	59%	Sarah Palin	36%	23	1,173	± 2.9%
McClatchy-Marist	December 3–5	Hillary Clinton	55%	Rand Paul	40%	15	1,173	± 2.9%
McClatchy-Marist	December 3–5	Hillary Clinton	58%	Rick Perry	37%	21	1,173	± 2.9%
McClatchy-Marist	December 3–5	Hillary Clinton	52%	Marco Rubio	42%	10	1,173	± 2.9%
McClatchy-Marist	December 3–5	Hillary Clinton	56%	Paul Ryan	40%	16	1,173	± 2.9%
Quinnipiac University	November 6–11	Hillary Clinton	42%	Chris Christie	43%	1	2,545	± 1.9%
Quinnipiac University	November 6–11	Hillary Clinton	51%	Ted Cruz	36%	15	2,545	± 1.9%
Quinnipiac University	November 6–11	Hillary Clinton	49%	Rand Paul	40%	9	2,545	± 1.9%
Quinnipiac University	November 6–11	Hillary Clinton	49%	Paul Ryan	40%	9	2,545	± 1.9%
NBC News	November 7–10	Hillary Clinton	44%	Chris Christie	34%	10	1,003	± 3.6%
Rasmussen	November 7–8	Hillary Clinton	43%	Chris Christie	41%	2	1,000	± 3%
Public Policy Polling	October 29–31	Hillary Clinton	48%	Jeb Bush	39%	9	649	± 3.8%
Public Policy Polling	October 29–31	Hillary Clinton	44%	Chris Christie	39%	5	649	± 3.8%
Public Policy Polling	October 29–31	Hillary Clinton	50%	Ted Cruz	33%	17	649	± 3.8%
Public Policy Polling	October 29–31	Hillary Clinton	49%	Rand Paul	37%	12	649	± 3.8%
Public Policy Polling	October 29–31	Joe Biden	42%	Jeb Bush	43%	1	649	± 3.8%
Public Policy Polling	October 29–31	Joe Biden	38%	Chris Christie	45%	7	649	± 3.8%
Public Policy Polling	October 29–31	Joe Biden	46%	Ted Cruz	36%	10	649	± 3.8%
Public Policy Polling	October 29–31	Joe Biden	45%	Rand Paul	38%	7	649	± 3.8%
Quinnipiac University	September 23–29	Hillary Clinton	49%	Chris Christie	36%	13	1,497	± 2.5%
Quinnipiac University	September 23–29	Hillary Clinton	54%	Ted Cruz	31%	23	1,497	± 2.5%
Quinnipiac University	September 23–29	Hillary Clinton	53%	Rand Paul	36%	17	1,497	± 2.5%
Rasmussen	September 16–17	Joe Biden	35%	Chris Christie	39%	4	1,000	± 3%
Monmouth University	July 25–30	Hillary Clinton	47%	Jeb Bush	37%	10	850	± 3.4%
Monmouth University	July 25–30	Hillary Clinton	43%	Chris Christie	39%	4	850	± 3.4%
Monmouth University	July 25–30	Hillary Clinton	48%	Ted Cruz	32%	16	850	± 3.4%
Monmouth University	July 25–30	Hillary Clinton	47%	Marco Rubio	36%	11	850	± 3.4%
Public Policy Polling	July 19–21	Hillary Clinton	44%	Jeb Bush	41%	3	800	± 3.5%
Public Policy Polling	July 19–21	Hillary Clinton	43%	Chris Christie	42%	1	800	± 3.5%
Public Policy Polling	July 19–21	Hillary Clinton	47%	Rand Paul	39%	8	800	± 3.5%
Public Policy Polling	July 19–21	Hillary Clinton	45%	Marco Rubio	40%	5	800	± 3.5%
Public Policy Polling	July 19–21	Hillary Clinton	46%	Paul Ryan	44%	2	800	± 3.5%
Public Policy Polling	July 19–21	Joe Biden	41%	Jeb Bush	45%	4	800	± 3.5%
Public Policy Polling	July 19–21	Joe Biden	39%	Chris Christie	45%	6	800	± 3.5%
Public Policy Polling	July 19–21	Joe Biden	43%	Rand Paul	43%	Tied	800	± 3.5%
Public Policy Polling	July 19–21	Joe Biden	42%	Marco Rubio	42%	Tied	800	± 3.5%
Public Policy Polling	July 19–21	Joe Biden	43%	Paul Ryan	46%	3	800	± 3.5%
McClatchy-Marist	July 15–18	Hillary Clinton	48%	Jeb Bush	40%	8	491	± 4.4%
McClatchy-Marist	July 15–18	Hillary Clinton	47%	Chris Christie	41%	6	491	± 4.4%
McClatchy-Marist	July 15–18	Hillary Clinton	50%	Rand Paul	38%	12	491	± 4.4%
McClatchy-Marist	July 15–18	Hillary Clinton	52%	Rick Perry	36%	16	491	± 4.4%
McClatchy-Marist	July 15–18	Hillary Clinton	50%	Marco Rubio	38%	12	491	± 4.4%
McClatchy-Marist	July 15–18	Hillary Clinton	53%	Paul Ryan	37%	16	491	± 4.4%
Quinnipiac University	June 28 – July 8	Hillary Clinton	46%	Chris Christie	40%	6	2,014	± 2.2%
Quinnipiac University	June 28 – July 8	Hillary Clinton	50%	Rand Paul	38%	12	2,014	± 2.2%
Quinnipiac University	June 28 – July 8	Joe Biden	35%	Chris Christie	46%	11	2,014	± 2.2%
Quinnipiac University	June 28 – July 8	Joe Biden	42%	Rand Paul	42%	Tied	2,014	± 2.2%
Quinnipiac University	May 22–28	Hillary Clinton	48%	Jeb Bush	40%	8	1,419	± 2.6%
Quinnipiac University	May 22–28	Hillary Clinton	49%	Rand Paul	41%	8	1,419	± 2.6%
Quinnipiac University	May 22–28	Joe Biden	38%	Jeb Bush	44%	6	1,419	± 2.6%
Quinnipiac University	May 22–28	Joe Biden	39%	Rand Paul	43%	4	1,419	± 2.6%
Public Policy Polling	May 6–9	Hillary Clinton	47%	Chris Christie	44%	3	1,099	± 3%
Public Policy Polling	May 6–9	Hillary Clinton	51%	Rand Paul	41%	10	1,099	± 3%
Public Policy Polling	May 6–9	Hillary Clinton	51%	Marco Rubio	41%	10	1,099	± 3%
Public Policy Polling	May 6–9	Joe Biden	40%	Chris Christie	49%	9	1,099	± 3%
Public Policy Polling	May 6–9	Joe Biden	46%	Rand Paul	44%	2	1,099	± 3%
Public Policy Polling	May 6–9	Joe Biden	46%	Marco Rubio	45%	1	1,099	± 3%
Public Policy Polling	March 27–30	Hillary Clinton	46%	Chris Christie	42%	4	1,247	± 2.8%
Public Policy Polling	March 27–30	Hillary Clinton	49%	Rand Paul	43%	6	1,247	± 2.8%
Public Policy Polling	March 27–30	Hillary Clinton	49%	Marco Rubio	42%	7	1,247	± 2.8%
Public Policy Polling	March 27–30	Hillary Clinton	50%	Paul Ryan	43%	7	1,247	± 2.8%
Public Policy Polling	March 27–30	Joe Biden	40%	Chris Christie	49%	9	1,247	± 2.8%
Public Policy Polling	March 27–30	Joe Biden	47%	Rand Paul	43%	4	1,247	± 2.8%
Public Policy Polling	March 27–30	Joe Biden	46%	Marco Rubio	44%	2	1,247	± 2.8%
Public Policy Polling	March 27–30	Joe Biden	48%	Paul Ryan	45%	3	1,247	± 2.8%
McClatchy-Marist	March 25–27	Hillary Clinton	54%	Jeb Bush	38%	16	519	± 4.3%
McClatchy-Marist	March 25–27	Hillary Clinton	46%	Chris Christie	43%	3	519	± 4.3%
McClatchy-Marist	March 25–27	Hillary Clinton	52%	Rand Paul	41%	11	519	± 4.3%
McClatchy-Marist	March 25–27	Hillary Clinton	52%	Marco Rubio	40%	12	519	± 4.3%
McClatchy-Marist	March 25–27	Joe Biden	49%	Jeb Bush	41%	8	519	± 4.3%
McClatchy-Marist	March 25–27	Joe Biden	43%	Chris Christie	46%	3	519	± 4.3%
McClatchy-Marist	March 25–27	Joe Biden	50%	Rand Paul	41%	9	519	± 4.3%
McClatchy-Marist	March 25–27	Joe Biden	53%	Marco Rubio	39%	14	519	± 4.3%
Quinnipiac University	February 27 – March 4	Hillary Clinton	45%	Chris Christie	37%	8	1,944	± 2.2%
Quinnipiac University	February 27 – March 4	Hillary Clinton	50%	Marco Rubio	34%	16	1,944	± 2.2%
Quinnipiac University	February 27 – March 4	Hillary Clinton	50%	Paul Ryan	38%	12	1,944	± 2.2%
Quinnipiac University	February 27 – March 4	Joe Biden	40%	Chris Christie	43%	3	1,944	± 2.2%
Quinnipiac University	February 27 – March 4	Joe Biden	45%	Marco Rubio	38%	7	1,944	± 2.2%
Quinnipiac University	February 27 – March 4	Joe Biden	45%	Paul Ryan	42%	3	1,944	± 2.2%
Quinnipiac University	February 27 – March 4	Andrew Cuomo	28%	Chris Christie	45%	17	1,944	± 2.2%
Quinnipiac University	February 27 – March 4	Andrew Cuomo	37%	Marco Rubio	37%	Tie	1,944	± 2.2%
Quinnipiac University	February 27 – March 4	Andrew Cuomo	37%	Paul Ryan	42%	5	1,944	± 2.2%
Public Policy Polling	January 31 – February 3	Hillary Clinton	49%	Jeb Bush	43%	6	800	± 3.5%
Public Policy Polling	January 31 – February 3	Hillary Clinton	46%	Chris Christie	41%	5	800	± 3.5%
Public Policy Polling	January 31 – February 3	Hillary Clinton	49%	Marco Rubio	41%	8	800	± 3.5%
Public Policy Polling	January 31 – February 3	Hillary Clinton	50%	Paul Ryan	44%	6	800	± 3.5%
Public Policy Polling	January 31 – February 3	Joe Biden	48%	Jeb Bush	45%	3	800	± 3.5%
Public Policy Polling	January 31 – February 3	Joe Biden	44%	Chris Christie	44%	Tie	800	± 3.5%
Public Policy Polling	January 31 – February 3	Joe Biden	48%	Marco Rubio	43%	5	800	± 3.5%
Public Policy Polling	January 31 – February 3	Joe Biden	49%	Paul Ryan	45%	4	800	± 3.5%
Purple Strategies	December 8–10, 2012	Hillary Clinton	53%	Paul Ryan	36%	17	1,000	± 3.1%

=== Three-way race ===
Poll source	Date	Hillary Clinton Democratic	Donald Trump Republican	Gary Johnson Libertarian	Leading by (points)	Sample size	Margin of error
Google Consumer Surveys	November 1–7, 2016	38%	36%	5%	2	26,574	± 0.65%
Angus Reid Institute	November 1–4, 2016	48%	44%	6%	4	1,151	± 2.9%
RAND American Life Panel	October 20 – November 1, 2016	44%	35%	8%	9	2,269	± 1.9%
Google Consumer Surveys	October 20–24, 2016	39%	34%	6%	5	21,240	±0.73%
Public Policy Polling	October 20–21, 2016	46%	40%	5%	6	990	±3.18%
Google Consumer Surveys	October 15–19, 2016	39%	34%	6%	5	22,826	±0.70%
Google Consumer Surveys	October 10–14, 2016	38%	33%	7%	5	19,900	±0.75%
Public Religion Research Institute/The Atlantic	September 28 – October 2, 2016	47%	41%	3%	6	609	±3.6%
Google Consumer Surveys	September 27 – October 3, 2016	39%	34%	7%	5	22,006	±0.71%
Google Consumer Surveys	September 14–20, 2016	36%	35%	8%	1	20,864	±0.73%

Polls up to August 2, when three-way polls paused

Poll source	Date	Democratic candidate	%	Republican candidate	%	Libertarian candidate	%	Lead margin
Fox News Sample size: 1,022; Margin of error: ±3%	July 31 – August 2, 2016	Hillary Clinton	44%	Donald Trump	35%	Gary Johnson	12%	9
Penn Schoen Berland Sample size: 1,000; Margin of error: ±3%	July 29 – August 1, 2016	Hillary Clinton	45%	Donald Trump	40%	Gary Johnson	15%	5
CBS News Sample size: 1,131; Margin of error: ±3%	July 29–31, 2016	Hillary Clinton	43%	Donald Trump	38%	Gary Johnson	10%	5
Morning Consult Sample size: 1,931; Margin of error: ±2%	July 29–30, 2016	Hillary Clinton	41%	Donald Trump	36%	Gary Johnson	11%	5
Morning Consult Sample size: 2,502; Margin of error: ±2%	July 22–24, 2016	Hillary Clinton	36%	Donald Trump	40%	Gary Johnson	10%	4
CBS News Sample size: 1,118 adults Margin of error ±4%	July 22–24, 2016	Hillary Clinton	39%	Donald Trump	40%	Gary Johnson	12%	1
Greenberg Quinlan Rosner Sample size: 900; Margin of error: ±3.27%	July 13–18, 2016	Hillary Clinton	43%	Donald Trump	40%	Gary Johnson	11%	3
Morning Consult Sample size: 2,002; Margin of error: ±2%	July 14–16, 2016	Hillary Clinton	38%	Donald Trump	35%	Gary Johnson	11%	3
CBS News/New York Times Sample size: 1,358; Margin of error: ±3%	July 8–12, 2016	Hillary Clinton	36%	Donald Trump	36%	Gary Johnson	12%	Tied
Morning Consult Sample size: 2,001; Margin of error: ±2%	July 8–10, 2016	Hillary Clinton	39%	Donald Trump	37%	Gary Johnson	12%	2
Rasmussen Reports Sample size: 1,000; Margin of error: ±3%	July 5, 2016	Hillary Clinton	38%	Donald Trump	40%	Gary Johnson	9%	2
Morning Consult Sample size: 2,001; Margin of error: ±2%	June 30 – July 4, 2016	Hillary Clinton	38%	Donald Trump	37%	Gary Johnson	11%	1
Fox News Sample size: 1,017; Margin of error: ±3%	June 26–28, 2016	Hillary Clinton	41%	Donald Trump	36%	Gary Johnson	10%	5
Greenberg Quinlan Rosner Sample size: 900; Margin of error: ±3.27%	June 23–28, 2016	Hillary Clinton	48%	Donald Trump	37%	Gary Johnson	8%	11
The Economist/YouGov Sample size: 1,300; Margin of error: ±3.9%	June 24–27, 2016	Hillary Clinton	40%	Donald Trump	35%	Gary Johnson	8%	5
Morning Consult Sample size: 4001; Margin of error: ±2%	June 24–27, 2016	Hillary Clinton	39%	Donald Trump	36%	Gary Johnson	11%	3
Pew Research Sample size: 1,655; Margin of error: ±2.7%	June 15–26, 2016	Hillary Clinton	45%	Donald Trump	36%	Gary Johnson	11%	9
Morning Consult Sample size: 3891; Margin of error: ±2%	June 15–20, 2016	Hillary Clinton	38%	Donald Trump	38%	Gary Johnson	10%	Tied
CBS News Sample size: 1048; Margin of error: ± 3.0%	June 9–13, 2016	Hillary Clinton	39%	Donald Trump	32%	Gary Johnson	11%	7
Bloomberg Politics Sample size: 750; Margin of error: ± 3.6%	June 10–13, 2016	Hillary Clinton	49%	Donald Trump	37%	Gary Johnson	9%	12
Morning Consult Sample size: 1004; Margin of error: ± 3%	June 8–9, 2016	Hillary Clinton	39%	Donald Trump	33%	Gary Johnson	10%	6
Fox News Sample size: 1004; Margin of error: ± 3%	June 5–8, 2016	Hillary Clinton	39%	Donald Trump	36%	Gary Johnson	12%	3
Rasmussen Report Sample size: 1000; Margin of error: ± 3%	June 6–7, 2016	Hillary Clinton	38%	Donald Trump	37%	Gary Johnson	8%	1
Morning Consult Sample size: 2001; Margin of error: ± 2%	June 1–4, 2016	Hillary Clinton	37%	Donald Trump	35%	Gary Johnson (identified as Independent)	10%	2
Morning Consult Sample size: 2001; Margin of error: ± 2%	June 1–4, 2016	Hillary Clinton	36%	Donald Trump	37%	Gary Johnson (identified as Libertarian)	10%	1
Morning Consult Sample size: 2001; Margin of error: ± 2%	May 19–23, 2016	Hillary Clinton	38%	Donald Trump	35%	Gary Johnson	10%	3
Fox News Sample size: 1,021; Margin of error: ± 3.0%	May 14–17, 2016	Hillary Clinton	39%	Donald Trump	42%	Gary Johnson	10%	3
Monmouth University Sample size: 848; Margin of error ±3.4%	March 17–20, 2016	Hillary Clinton	42%	Donald Trump	34%	Gary Johnson	11%	8

Poll source	Date	Democratic candidate	%	Republican candidate	%	Third candidate	%	Lead margin
ABC News/Washington Post Sample size: 823; Margin of error: ± 3.5%	May 16–19, 2016	Hillary Clinton	37%	Donald Trump	35%	Mitt Romney	22%	2
Public Policy Polling Sample size: 1,083; Margin of error ±3.0%	March 24–26, 2016	Hillary Clinton	42%	Donald Trump	37%	Deez Nuts	10%	5
Public Policy Polling Sample size: 1,083; Margin of error ±3.0%	March 24–26, 2016	Bernie Sanders	43%	Donald Trump	37%	Deez Nuts	8%	6
Public Policy Polling Sample size: 1,083; Margin of error ±3.0%	March 24–26, 2016	Hillary Clinton	44%	Donald Trump	35%	Rick Perry	12%	9
Public Policy Polling Sample size: 1,083; Margin of error ±3.0%	March 24–26, 2016	Bernie Sanders	43%	Donald Trump	34%	Rick Perry	12%	9
Quinnipiac University Sample size: 1,342; Margin of error ±2.7%	February 10–15, 2016	Bernie Sanders	38%	Donald Trump	38%	Michael Bloomberg	12%	Tied
Quinnipiac University Sample size: 1,342; Margin of error ±2.7%	February 10–15, 2016	Bernie Sanders	39%	Ted Cruz	33%	Michael Bloomberg	14%	6
Suffolk University/USA Today Sample size: 1,000; Margin of error ± 3%	February 11–15, 2016	Bernie Sanders	30%	Donald Trump	37%	Michael Bloomberg	16%	7
Quinnipiac University Sample size: 1,125; Margin of error ±2.9%	February 2–4, 2016	Bernie Sanders	35%	Donald Trump	36%	Michael Bloomberg	15%	1
Quinnipiac University Sample size: 1,125; Margin of error ±2.9%	February 2–4, 2016	Bernie Sanders	37%	Ted Cruz	36%	Michael Bloomberg	15%	1
Public Policy Polling Sample size: 1,236; Margin of error	February 2–3, 2016	Hillary Clinton	41%	Donald Trump	37%	Michael Bloomberg	11%	4
Public Policy Polling Sample size: 1,236; Margin of error	February 2–3, 2016	Bernie Sanders	36%	Donald Trump	39%	Michael Bloomberg	13%	3
Luntz Global Sample size: 900; Margin of error ±3.3%	January 26–27, 2016	Hillary Clinton	33%	Donald Trump	37%	Michael Bloomberg	29%	4
Luntz Global Sample size: 900; Margin of error ±3.3%	January 26–27, 2016	Hillary Clinton	37%	Ted Cruz	35%	Michael Bloomberg	28%	2
Luntz Global Sample size: 900; Margin of error ±3.3%	January 26–27, 2016	Hillary Clinton	35%	Marco Rubio	38%	Michael Bloomberg	28%	3
Morning Consult Sample size: 1,439; Margin of error ±3%	January 21–24, 2016	Bernie Sanders	35%	Donald Trump	34%	Michael Bloomberg	12%	1
Morning Consult Sample size: 1,439; Margin of error ±3%	January 21–24, 2016	Bernie Sanders	36%	Ted Cruz	28%	Michael Bloomberg	11%	8
Morning Consult Sample size: 1,439; Margin of error ±3%	January 21–24, 2016	Bernie Sanders	36%	Marco Rubio	29%	Michael Bloomberg	10%	7
Morning Consult Sample size: 4,060; Margin of error ±2%	January 14–17, 2016	Hillary Clinton	38%	Ted Cruz	34%	Michael Bloomberg	11%	4
Morning Consult Sample size: 4,060; Margin of error ±2%	January 14–17, 2016	Hillary Clinton	38%	Marco Rubio	33%	Michael Bloomberg	10%	5
Morning Consult Sample size: 4,060; Margin of error ±2%	January 14–17, 2016	Hillary Clinton	36%	Donald Trump	37%	Michael Bloomberg	13%	1
Saint Leo University Polling Institute	November 29 – December 3, 2015	Hillary Clinton	45.4%	Ted Cruz	19.9%	Donald Trump	26.1%	19.3
Saint Leo University Polling Institute	November 29 – December 3, 2015	Hillary Clinton	44.8%	Carly Fiorina	14.9%	Donald Trump	29.6%	15.2
Saint Leo University Polling Institute	November 29 – December 3, 2015	Hillary Clinton	44.0%	Ben Carson	20.1%	Donald Trump	25.7%	18.3
Saint Leo University Polling Institute	November 29 – December 3, 2015	Hillary Clinton	43.3%	Marco Rubio	21.8%	Donald Trump	25.9%	17.4
Saint Leo University Polling Institute	November 29 – December 3, 2015	Hillary Clinton	43.3%	Jeb Bush	19.6%	Donald Trump	29.5%	13.8
Saint Leo University Polling Institute Margin of error ±6.0% Sample size: 1005	October 17–22, 2015	Hillary Clinton	42.7%	Jeb Bush	22.8%	Donald Trump	24.2%	18.5
Saint Leo University Polling Institute Margin of error ±6.0% Sample size: 1005	October 17–22, 2015	Hillary Clinton	43.7%	Carly Fiorina	22.6%	Donald Trump	23.8%	19.9
Saint Leo University Polling Institute Margin of error ±6.0% Sample size: 1005	October 17–22, 2015	Hillary Clinton	43.1%	Ben Carson	27.9%	Donald Trump	20.2%	15.2
Saint Leo University Polling Institute Margin of error ±6.0% Sample size: 1005	October 17–22, 2015	Hillary Clinton	43.7%	Marco Rubio	24.6%	Donald Trump	22.9%	19.1
Saint Leo University Polling Institute Margin of error ±6.0% Sample size: 1005	October 17–22, 2015	Hillary Clinton	44.9%	Ted Cruz	18.6%	Donald Trump	24.1%	20.8
Public Policy Polling; Margin of error: ±2.8% Sample size: 1254	August 28–30, 2015	Hillary Clinton	42%	Jeb Bush	23%	Donald Trump	27%	15
Fox News Sample size: 1008	August 11–13, 2015	Hillary Clinton	42%	Carly Fiorina	24%	Donald Trump	25%	17
Fox News Sample size: 1008	August 11–13, 2015	Hillary Clinton	42%	Marco Rubio	30%	Donald Trump	22%	12
Fox News Sample size: 1008	August 11–13, 2015	Hillary Clinton	42%	Jeb Bush	29%	Donald Trump	23%	13
McClatchy-Marist; Margin of error: ±2.8% Sample size: 964	July 22–28, 2015	Hillary Clinton	44%	Jeb Bush	29%	Donald Trump	20%	15
Public Policy Polling; Margin of error: ±4.0% Sample size: 1,087	July 20–21, 2015	Hillary Clinton	43%	Jeb Bush	25%	Donald Trump	23%	18
ABC News/Washington Post; Margin of error: ±4.0% Sample size: 815	July 16–19, 2015	Hillary Clinton	47%	Jeb Bush	30%	Donald Trump	20%	17

=== Four-way race ===
Poll source	Date	Hillary Clinton Democratic	Donald Trump Republican	Gary Johnson Libertarian	Jill Stein Green	Leading by (points)	Sample size	Margin of error
YouGov/The Economist	November 4–7, 2016	45%	41%	5%	2%	4	3,677	± 1.7%
Insights West	November 4–7, 2016	49%	45%	4%	1%	4	940	± 3.2%
Bloomberg News/Selzer	November 4–6, 2016	44%	41%	4%	2%	3	799	± 3.5%
Gravis Marketing	November 3–6, 2016	47%	43%	3%	2%	4	16,639	± 0.8%
ABC News/Washington Post	November 3–6, 2016	47%	43%	4%	1%	4	2,220	± 2.5%
Fox News	November 3–6, 2016	48%	44%	3%	2%	4	1,295	± 2.5%
IBD/TIPP	November 3–6, 2016	41%	43%	6%	2%	2	1,026	± 3.1%
Monmouth University	November 3–6, 2016	50%	44%	4%	1%	6	802	± 3.6%
Ipsos/Reuters	November 2–6, 2016	42%	39%	6%	3%	3	2,195	± 2.4%
CBS News/New York Times	November 2–6, 2016	45%	41%	5%	2%	4	1,426	± 3.0%
Rasmussen Reports	November 2–6, 2016	45%	43%	4%	2%	2	1,500	± 2.5%
NBC News/SurveyMonkey	October 31– November 6, 2016	47%	41%	6%	3%	6	70,194	± 1.0%
Politico/Morning Consult	November 4–5, 2016	45%	42%	8%	2%	3	1,482	± 3.0%
NBC News/Wall Street Journal	November 3–5, 2016	44%	40%	6%	2%	4	1,282	± 2.73%
ABC News/Washington Post	November 2–5, 2016	47%	43%	4%	2%	4	1,937	± 2.5%
IBD/TIPP	November 2–5, 2016	43%	44%	5%	2%	1	903	± 3.3%
Franklin Pierce University/Boston Herald	November 1–5, 2016	48%	44%	4%	2%	4	1,009	± 3.1%
ABC News/Washington Post	November 1–4, 2016	48%	43%	4%	2%	5	1,685	± 2.5%
IBD/TIPP	November 1–4, 2016	44%	44%	5%	2%	Tied	804	± 3.5%
Ipsos/Reuters	October 31 – November 4, 2016	43%	39%	6%	2%	4	2,244	± 2.4%
Rasmussen Reports	November 1–3, 2016	44%	44%	4%	1%	Tied	1,500	± 2.5%
Fox News	November 1–3, 2016	45%	43%	5%	2%	2	1,107	± 3.0%
McClatchy/Marist	November 1–3, 2016	44%	43%	6%	2%	1	940	± 3.2%
IBD/TIPP	October 30 – November 3, 2016	44%	44%	4%	2%	Tied	898	± 3.3%
ABC News/Washington Post	October 31 – November 3, 2016	47%	43%	4%	2%	4	1,419	± 3.0%
Ipsos/Reuters	October 30 – November 3, 2016	44%	37%	6%	2%	7	2,021	± 2.6%
Gravis Marketing/Breitbart News	November 1–2, 2016	47%	45%	3%	1%	2	2,435	± 2.0%
Rasmussen Reports	October 31 – November 2, 2016	42%	45%	4%	1%	3	1,500	± 2.5%
ABC News/Washington Post	October 30 – November 2, 2016	47%	44%	3%	2%	3	1,151	± 3.0%
IBD/TIPP	October 29 – November 2, 2016	44%	44%	4%	2%	Tied	867	± 3.4%
Ipsos/Reuters	October 29 – November 2, 2016	45%	37%	5%	2%	8	1,858	± 2.6%
Rasmussen Reports	October 30 – November 1, 2016	44%	44%	5%	2%	Tied	1,500	± 2.5%
YouGov/Economist	October 30 – November 1, 2016	46%	43%	4%	2%	3	1,233	± 3.2%
ABC News/Washington Post	October 29 – November 1, 2016	47%	45%	3%	2%	2	1,167	± 3.0%
CBS News/New York Times	October 28 – November 1, 2016	45%	42%	5%	4%	3	862	± 3.4%
Ipsos/Reuters	October 28 – November 1, 2016	45%	37%	5%	2%	8	1,772	± 3.0%
IBD/TIPP	October 27 – November 1, 2016	44%	44%	4%	2%	Tied	862	± 3.4%
ABC News/Washington Post	October 28–31, 2016	46%	46%	3%	2%	Tied	1,167	± 3.0%
Rasmussen Reports	October 27–31, 2016	45%	45%	5%	2%	Tied	1,500	± 2.5%
IBD/TIPP	October 26–31, 2016	45%	44%	4%	2%	1	1,018	± 3.2%
Politico/Morning Consult	October 29–30, 2016	42%	39%	7%	5%	3	1,772	±2.0%
ABC News/Washington Post	October 27–30, 2016	45%	46%	3%	2%	1	1,167	± 3.0%
Ipsos/Reuters	October 26–30, 2016	43%	37%	6%	1%	6	1,264	± 3.0%
Rasmussen Reports	October 26–30, 2016	45%	42%	5%	2%	3	1,500	± 2.5%
IBD/TIPP	October 25–30, 2016	45%	44%	4%	2%	1	993	± 3.2%
NBC News/SurveyMonkey	October 24–30, 2016	47%	41%	6%	3%	6	40,816	±1.0%
ABC News/Washington Post	October 26–29, 2016	46%	45%	4%	2%	1	1,165	± 3.0%
IBD/TIPP	October 24–29, 2016	44%	42%	6%	2%	2	1,039	± 3.3%
Red Oak Strategic/Google Consumer Surveys	October 27–28, 2016	37%	37%	6%	2%	Tied	943	± 3.7%
Morning Consult	October 27–28, 2016	42%	39%	8%	4%	3	1,794	± 2.0%
ABC News/Washington Post	October 25–28, 2016	46%	45%	4%	2%	1	1,160	± 3.0%
IBD/TIPP	October 23–28, 2016	45%	41%	7%	2%	4	1,013	± 3.3%
Rasmussen Reports	October 25–27, 2016	45%	45%	3%	2%	Tied	1,500	±2.5%
ABC News/Washington Post	October 24–27, 2016	47%	45%	4%	2%	2	1,148	±3.0%
IBD/TIPP	October 22–27, 2016	44%	41%	7%	2%	3	973	± 3.3%
Gravis Marketing/Breitbart	October 25–26, 2016	46%	45%	3%	1%	1	1,824	±2.3%
Rasmussen Reports	October 24–26, 2016	45%	44%	4%	1%	1	1,500	±2.5%
ABC News/Washington Post	October 23–26, 2016	48%	44%	4%	1%	4	1,150	±3.0%
YouGov/Economist	October 22–26, 2016	46%	41%	4%	2%	5	1,376	±3.1%
Saint Leo University	October 22–26, 2016	45%	34%	6%	2%	11	1,050	±%
IBD/TIPP	October 21–26, 2016	43%	41%	8%	2%	2	945	± 3.3%
Rasmussen Reports	October 23–25, 2016	44%	43%	4%	1%	1	1,500	±2.5%
Fox News	October 22–25, 2016	44%	41%	7%	3%	3	1,221	±2.5%
ABC News/Washington Post	October 22–25, 2016	48%	42%	5%	1%	6	1,135	±3.0%
Pew Research Center	October 20–25, 2016	46%	40%	6%	3%	6	2,120	± 2.4%
IBD/TIPP	October 20–25, 2016	42%	41%	8%	3%	1	921	± 3.3%
CNBC	October 21–24, 2016	43%	34%	7%	2%	9	804	± 3.5%
ABC News	October 21–24, 2016	49%	40%	5%	2%	9	1,119	±3.0%
Greenberg Quinlan Rosner	October 21–24, 2016	50%	38%	5%	2%	12	900	± 3.27%
Associated Press/GFK	October 20–24, 2016	51%	37%	6%	2%	14	1,546	± 2.75%
USA Today/Suffolk University	October 20–24, 2016	47%	38%	4%	2%	9	1,000	±3.0%
Ipsos/Reuters	October 20–24, 2016	42%	38%	7%	2%	4	1,170	±3.3%
Rasmussen Reports	October 20–24, 2016	43%	42%	5%	2%	1	1,500	±2.5%
IBD/TIPP	October 19–24, 2016	42%	41%	8%	3%	1	873	± 3.6%
ABC News	October 20–23, 2016	50%	38%	5%	2%	12	1,155	±3.0%
CNN/ORC	October 20–23, 2016	49%	44%	3%	2%	5	779	±3.5%
Rasmussen Reports	October 19–23, 2016	41%	43%	5%	3%	2	1,500	±2.5%
IBD/TIPP	October 18–23, 2016	41%	41%	7%	3%	Tied	815	± 3.6%
Centre College	October 18–23, 2016	45%	40%	6%	1%	5	569	±4.1%
NBC News/SurveyMonkey	October 17–23, 2016	46%	41%	7%	3%	5	32,225	± 1.0%
ABC News	October 20–22, 2016	50%	38%	5%	2%	12	1,391	±3.5%
IBD/TIPP	October 17–22, 2016	41%	43%	7%	3%	2	783	± 3.6%
IBD/TIPP	October 16–21, 2016	40%	42%	7%	4%	2	791	±3.6%
Politico/Morning Consult	October 19–20, 2016	42%	36%	9%	4%	6	1,395	±3.0%
Rasmussen Reports	October 18–20, 2016	41%	43%	5%	3%	2	1,500	±2.5%
Ipsos/Reuters	October 14–20, 2016	43%	39%	6%	2%	4	1,640	±3.0%
Rasmussen Reports	October 17–19, 2016	40%	43%	6%	3%	3	1,500	±2.5%
IBD/TIPP	October 14–19, 2016	40%	41%	7%	5%	1	779	±3.6%
Quinnipiac University	October 17–18, 2016	47%	40%	7%	1%	7	1,007	±3.1%
YouGov/Economist	October 15–18, 2016	42%	38%	6%	1%	4	1,300	±3.9%
IBD/TIPP	October 13–18, 2016	40%	41%	8%	6%	1	782	±3.6%
Fox News	October 15–17, 2016	45%	39%	5%	3%	6	912	±3.0%
Bloomberg Politics	October 14–17, 2016	47%	38%	8%	3%	9	1,006	±3.1%
Rasmussen Reports	October 13–17, 2016	42%	41%	7%	2%	1	1,500	±2.5%
Ipsos/Reuters	October 13–17, 2016	42%	38%	6%	2%	4	1,190	±3.2%
Monmouth University	October 14–16, 2016	50%	38%	5%	2%	12	805	±3.5%
CBS News	October 12–16, 2016	47%	38%	8%	3%	9	1,411	±3.0%
Rasmussen Reports	October 12–16, 2016	43%	41%	5%	2%	2	1,500	±2.5%
NBC News/SurveyMonkey	October 10–16, 2016	46%	40%	8%	4%	6	24,804	± 1.0%
Politico/Morning Consult	October 13–15, 2016	42%	36%	10%	3%	6	1,737	±2.0%
SurveyUSA/Boston Globe	October 11–14, 2016	46%	36%	5%	2%	10	845	±3.4%
Rasmussen Reports	October 11–13, 2016	41%	43%	6%	2%	2	1,500	±2.5%
NBC News/Wall Street Journal	October 10–13, 2016	48%	37%	7%	2%	11	1,000	±3.1%
ABC News/Washington Post	October 10–13, 2016	47%	43%	5%	2%	4	740	±4.0%
Franklin Pierce University/Boston Herald	October 9–13, 2016	46%	41%	6%	2%	5	1,011	±3.1%
George Washington University	October 8–13, 2016	47%	39%	8%	2%	8	1,000	±3.1%
Fox News	October 10–12, 2016	45%	38%	7%	3%	7	917	±3.0%
Rasmussen Reports	October 10–12, 2016	41%	43%	6%	2%	2	1,500	±2.5%
Insights West	October 10–11, 2016	47%	41%	7%	3%	6	953	±3.2%
Rasmussen Reports	October 9–11, 2016	43%	39%	7%	2%	4	1,500	±2.5%
Politico/Morning Consult	October 10, 2016	42%	37%	10%	3%	5	1,757	±3.0%
NBC News/Wall Street Journal	October 8–10, 2016	45%	36%	8%	2%	9	806	±3.5%
Rasmussen Reports	October 6–10, 2016	44%	39%	7%	2%	5	1,500	±2.5%
Ipsos/Reuters	October 6–10, 2016	44%	37%	6%	2%	7	2,363	±2.3%
Pew Research	September 27 – October 10, 2016	46%	39%	10%	4%	7	3,616	± 2.9%
NBC News/Wall Street Journal	October 8–9, 2016	46%	35%	9%	2%	11	422	±4.6%
Rasmussen Reports	October 5–9, 2016	45%	38%	7%	2%	7	1,500	±2.5%
Public Religion Research Institute/The Atlantic	October 5–9, 2016	49%	38%	2%	0%	11	886	±3.9%
NBC News/SurveyMonkey	October 3–9, 2016	46%	41%	8%	3%	5	23,329	±1.0%
Politico/Morning Consult	October 8, 2016	42%	38%	8%	3%	4	1,390	±3.0%
YouGov/Economist	October 7–8, 2016	44%	38%	5%	1%	6	1,300	±4.3%
Morning Consult	October 5–6, 2016	41%	39%	9%	3%	2	1,775	±2.0%
Quinnipiac University	October 5–6, 2016	45%	40%	6%	2%	5	1,064	±3.0%
Rasmussen Reports	October 4–6, 2016	43%	42%	7%	2%	1	1,500	±2.5%
Fox News	October 3–6, 2016	44%	42%	6%	2%	2	896	±3.0%
Ipsos/Reuters	September 30 – October 6, 2016	42%	37%	8%	2%	5	1,695	±3.0%
Rasmussen Reports	October 3–5, 2016	41%	43%	8%	3%	2	1,500	±2.5%
Breitbart/Gravis Marketing	October 3, 2016	44%	44%	5%	1%	Tied	1,690	±2.5%
YouGov/Economist	October 1–3, 2016	43%	40%	5%	3%	3	911	±3.9%
Ipsos/Reuters	September 29 – October 3, 2016	42%	36%	8%	2%	6	1,239	±3.2%
Rasmussen Reports	September 29 – October 3, 2016	42%	41%	9%	2%	1	1,500	±2.5%
Politico/Morning Consult	September 30 – October 2, 2016	42%	36%	9%	3%	6	1,778	±2.0%
Fairleigh Dickinson University	September 28 – October 2, 2016	45%	36%	11%	3%	9	385	±5.0%
CBS News/New York Times	September 28 – October 2, 2016	45%	41%	8%	3%	4	1,217	±3.0%
CNN/ORC	September 28 – October 2, 2016	47%	42%	7%	2%	5	N/A	±N/A%
Rasmussen Reports	September 28 – October 2, 2016	43%	40%	8%	2%	3	1,500	±2.5%
NBC News/SurveyMonkey	September 26 – October 2, 2016	46%	40%	9%	3%	6	26,925	±1.0%
Fox News	September 27–29, 2016	43%	40%	8%	4%	3	911	±3.0%
Ipsos/Reuters	September 23–29, 2016	42%	38%	7%	3%	4	2,501	±2.0%
Rasmussen Reports	September 26–28, 2016	42%	41%	7%	2%	1	1,500	±2.5%
Morning Consult	September 26–27, 2016	41%	38%	8%	4%	3	1,253	±3.0%
Public Religion Research Institute	September 1–27, 2016	49%	41%	4%	1%	8	2,010	±2.8%
Ipsos/Reuters	September 22–26, 2016	42%	38%	7%	2%	4	1,041	±3.5%
Quinnipiac University	September 22–25, 2016	44%	43%	8%	2%	1	1,115	±2.9%
Monmouth University	September 22–25, 2016	46%	42%	8%	2%	4	729	±3.6%
NBC News/SurveyMonkey	September 19–25, 2016	45%	40%	10%	3%	5	13,598	±1.1%
Morning Consult	September 22–24, 2016	38%	39%	9%	4%	1	1,712	±2.0%
YouGov/Economist	September 22–24, 2016	44%	41%	5%	2%	3	948	±3.8%
Bloomberg/Selzer	September 21–24, 2016	41%	43%	8%	4%	2	1,002	±3.1%
ABC News/Washington Post	September 19–22, 2016	46%	44%	5%	1%	2	651	±4.5%
Franklin Pierce University/Boston Herald	September 18–22, 2016	45%	43%	6%	2%	2	1,017	±3.1%
Ipsos/Reuters	September 16–22, 2016	39%	37%	7%	2%	2	1,559	±3.0%
Rasmussen Reports	September 20–21, 2016	39%	44%	8%	2%	5	1,000	±3.0%
Breitbart/Gravis Marketing	September 20, 2016	44%	40%	5%	2%	4	1,560	±2.5%
McClatchy/Marist	September 15–20, 2016	45%	39%	10%	4%	6	758	±3.6%
YouGov/Economist	September 18–19, 2016	40%	38%	7%	2%	2	936	±4.0%
NBC News/Wall Street Journal	September 16–19, 2016	43%	37%	9%	3%	6	922	±3.2%
iCitizen	September 15–19, 2016	42%	37%	5%	3%	5	1,000	±3.0%
Ipsos/Reuters	September 15–19, 2016	37%	39%	7%	2%	2	1,111	±3.4%
Associated Press/GFK	September 15–19, 2016	45%	39%	9%	2%	6	1,251	±2.5%
NBC News/SurveyMonkey	September 12–18, 2016	45%	40%	10%	4%	5	13,230	±1.2%
Morning Consult	September 15–16, 2016	42%	40%	8%	3%	2	1,639	±2.0%
Saint Leo University	September 12–16, 2016	46%	41%	9%	4%	5	1,005	±3.0%
Fox News	September 11–14, 2016	41%	40%	8%	3%	1	867	±3.0%
Rasmussen Reports	September 12–13, 2016	40%	42%	7%	2%	2	1,000	±3.0%
Emerson College	September 11–13, 2016	41%	43%	9%	2%	2	800	±3.4%
YouGov/Economist	September 10–13, 2016	42%	40%	5%	3%	2	1,087	±4.0%
CBS News/New York Times	September 9–13, 2016	42%	42%	8%	4%	Tied	1,433	±3.0%
Quinnipiac University	September 8–13, 2016	41%	39%	13%	4%	2	960	±3.2%
Ipsos/Reuters	September 8–12, 2016	39%	39%	8%	2%	Tied	1,127	±3.3%
Pew Research	August 16 – September 12, 2016	45%	38%	10%	4%	2	3,941	±2.6%
NBC News/SurveyMonkey	September 5–11, 2016	42%	40%	11%	4%	2	16,220	±1.1%
Gravis Marketing/Breitbart	September 7–8, 2016	43%	40%	7%	1%	3	2,348	±2.0%
Morning Consult	September 6–8, 2016	43%	41%	10%	3%	2	1,710	±2.0%
ABC News/Washington Post	September 5–8, 2016	46%	41%	9%	2%	5	642	±4.5%
Rasmussen Reports	September 6–7, 2016	43%	39%	9%	2%	4	1,000	±3.0%
YouGov/Economist	September 4–6, 2016	40%	38%	7%	5%	2	1,077	±4.7%
Ipsos/Reuters	September 1–5, 2016	40%	38%	8%	3%	2	1,084	±3.5%
CNN/ORC	September 1–4, 2016	43%	45%	7%	2%	2	786	±3.5%
Franklin Pierce University/Boston Herald	August 31 – September 4, 2016	44%	41%	8%	3%	3	1,025	±3.1%
NBC News/SurveyMonkey	August 29 – September 4, 2016	41%	37%	12%	4%	4	32,226	±1.0%
Morning Consult	September 1–2, 2016	38%	36%	9%	4%	2	2,001	±2.0%
George Washington University	August 28 – September 1, 2016	42%	40%	11%	3%	2	1,000	±3.1%
Ipsos/Reuters	August 26 – September 1, 2016	39%	39%	7%	2%	Tied	1,804	±3.0%
IBD/TPP	August 26 – September 1, 2016	39%	39%	12%	3%	Tied	861	±3.4%
Rasmussen Reports	August 29–30, 2016	39%	40%	7%	3%	1	1,000	±3.0%
Fox News	August 28–30, 2016	41%	39%	9%	4%	2	1,011	±3.0%
YouGov/Economist	August 27–29, 2016	42%	37%	7%	3%	5	1,119	±4.0%
Ipsos/Reuters	August 25–29, 2016	40%	38%	6%	2%	2	1,404	±3.0%
Suffolk University/USA Today	August 25–29, 2016	42%	35%	9%	4%	7	1,000	±3.0%
Monmouth University	August 25–28, 2016	43%	36%	8%	2%	7	689	±3.5%
NBC News/SurveyMonkey	August 22–28, 2016	41%	37%	11%	5%	4	24,104	±1.0%
Morning Consult	August 24–26, 2016	39%	37%	8%	3%	2	2,007	±2.0%
Ipsos/Reuters	August 22–25, 2016	39%	36%	7%	3%	3	1,154	±3.0%
Rasmussen Reports	August 23–24, 2016	42%	38%	9%	2%	4	1,000	±3.0%
Ipsos/Reuters	August 20–24, 2016	39%	36%	7%	2%	3	1,049	±2.9%
Quinnipiac University	August 18–24, 2016	45%	38%	10%	4%	7	1,498	±2.5%
Gravis Marketing	August 22–23, 2016	42%	41%	4%	1%	1	1,493	±2.5%
YouGov/Economist	August 19–23, 2016	42%	38%	6%	4%	4	1,080	±4.1%
Ipsos/Reuters	August 18–22, 2016	41%	33%	7%	2%	8	1,115	±3.0%
NBC News/SurveyMonkey	August 15–21, 2016	43%	38%	11%	5%	5	17,451	±1.1%
Morning Consult	August 16–20, 2016	39%	36%	8%	4%	3	2,001	±2.0%
Ipsos/Reuters	August 13–17, 2016	39%	35%	7%	2%	4	1,049	±2.8%
Rasmussen Reports	August 15–16, 2016	41%	39%	9%	3%	2	1,000	±3.0%
YouGov/Economist	August 11–16, 2016	41%	35%	7%	3%	6	1,076	±4.1%
Pew Research	August 9–16, 2016	41%	37%	10%	4%	4	1,567	±2.8%
Normington, Petts & Associates	August 9–15, 2016	45%	37%	8%	4%	8	1,000	±3.1%
NBC News/SurveyMonkey	August 8–14, 2016	43%	37%	11%	4%	6	15,179	±1.2%
Zogby Analytics	August 12–13, 2016	38%	36%	8%	5%	2	1,277	±2.8%
Morning Consult	August 11–14, 2016	39%	33%	9%	4%	6	2,001	±2.0%
Ipsos/Reuters	August 6–10, 2016	40%	35%	7%	3%	5	974	±2.9%
Rasmussen Reports	August 9–10, 2016	43%	40%	8%	2%	3	1,000	±3.0%
Breitbart/Gravis Marketing	August 9, 2016	42%	37%	9%	3%	5	2,832	±1.8%
YouGov/Economist	August 6–9, 2016	42%	36%	9%	2%	6	1,300	±4.2%
Bloomberg Politics	August 5–8, 2016	44%	40%	9%	4%	4	749	±3.6%
Princeton Survey	August 4–7, 2016	45%	39%	2%	1%	6	1,000	±3.9%
Monmouth University	August 4–7, 2016	46%	34%	7%	2%	12	803	±3.5%
NBC News/SurveyMonkey	August 1–7, 2016	44%	38%	10%	4%	6	11,480	±1.2%
Morning Consult	August 4–5, 2016	41%	33%	9%	5%	8	2,001	±2.0%
ABC News/Washington Post	August 1–4, 2016	45%	37%	8%	4%	8	1,002	±3.5%
Ipsos/Reuters	July 31 – August 4, 2016	42%	40%	6%	3%	2	1,154	±3.0%
IBD/TPP	July 29 – August 4, 2016	39%	35%	12%	5%	4	851	±3.4%
McClatchy/Marist	August 1–3, 2016	45%	31%	10%	6%	14	983	±3.1%
NBC News/Wall Street Journal	July 31 – August 3, 2016	43%	34%	10%	5%	9	800	±3.5%
Ipsos/Reuters	July 30 – August 3, 2016	42%	38%	6%	2%	4	1,072	±3.5%
Rasmussen Reports	August 1–2, 2016	44%	40%	6%	3%	4	1,000	±3.0%
The Economist/YouGov	July 31 – August 1, 2016	41%	36%	8%	4%	5	1,300	±4.0%
CNN/ORC	July 29–31, 2016	45%	37%	9%	5%	8	894	±3.5%
NBC News/SurveyMonkey	July 25–31, 2016	43%	38%	9%	4%	5	12,742	±1.2%
Public Policy Polling	July 29–30, 2016	46%	41%	6%	2%	5	1,276	±2.7%
RABA Research	July 29, 2016	46%	31%	7%	2%	15	956	±3.2%
Ipsos/Reuters	July 25–29, 2016	37%	37%	5%	1%	Tied	1,788	±2.4%
YouGov/Economist	July 23–24, 2016	40%	38%	5%	3%	2	1,300	±4.5%
CNN/ORC	July 22–24, 2016	39%	44%	9%	3%	5	882	±3.5%
University of Delaware	July 21–24, 2016	46%	42%	1%	1%	4	818	±4.0%
NBC News/SurveyMonkey	July 18–24, 2016	39%	41%	10%	5%	2	12,931	±1.2%
RABA Research	July 22, 2016	39%	34%	8%	3%	5	909	±3.3%
Echelon Insights	July 21–22, 2016	40%	39%	3%	2%	1	912	±N/A%
Ipsos/Reuters	July 16–20, 2016	39%	35%	7%	3%	4	1,522	±2.9%
YouGov/Economist	July 15–17, 2016	40%	37%	5%	4%	3	1,300	±4.2%
NBC News/SurveyMonkey	July 11–17, 2016	39%	40%	10%	5%	1	9,436	±1.4%
Monmouth University	July 14–16, 2016	45%	43%	5%	1%	2	688	±3.7%
Franklin Pierce University/Boston Herald	July 13–16, 2016	44%	41%	7%	2%	3	1,007	±3.1%
CNN/ORC	July 13–16, 2016	42%	37%	13%	5%	5	872	±3.5%
icitizen	July 11–14, 2016	39%	35%	9%	3%	4	1,000	±N/A%
ABC News/Washington Post	July 11–14, 2016	42%	38%	8%	5%	4	1,003	±3.5%
NBC News/Wall Street Journal	July 9–13, 2016	41%	35%	11%	6%	6	1,000	±3.1%
The Economist/YouGov	July 9–11, 2016	40%	37%	5%	2%	3	1,300	±4.2%
AP-GfK	July 7–11, 2016	40%	36%	6%	2%	4	837	±3.3%
NBC News/SurveyMonkey	July 4–10, 2016	40%	38%	11%	6%	2	7,869	±1.4%
Raba Research	July 7–9, 2016	41%	29%	9%	2%	12	781	±3.5%
McClatchy/Marist	July 5–9, 2016	40%	35%	10%	5%	5	1,249	±3.0%
Ipsos/Reuters	July 2–6, 2016	42%	33%	6%	4%	9	1,345	±2.8%
The Economist/YouGov	July 2–4, 2016	42%	37%	4%	3%	5	1,300	±3.9%
NBC News/SurveyMonkey	June 27 – July 3, 2016	41%	38%	9%	5%	3	10,072	±1.3%
Suffolk University/USA Today	June 26–29, 2016	39%	35%	8%	3%	4	1,000	±3.0%
Ipsos/Reuters	June 25–29, 2016	42%	31%	5%	4%	11	1,247	±2.8%
IBD/TIPP	June 24–29, 2016	37%	36%	9%	5%	1	837	±3.5%
Public Policy Polling	June 27–28, 2016	45%	41%	5%	2%	4	947	±3.2%
Quinnipiac University	June 21–27, 2016	39%	37%	8%	4%	2	1,610	±2.4%
NBC News/SurveyMonkey	June 20–26, 2016	42%	36%	9%	5%	6	5,818	±1.8%
ABC News/Washington Post	June 20–23, 2016	47%	37%	7%	3%	10	836	±4.0%
NBC News/Wall Street Journal	June 19–23, 2016	39%	38%	10%	6%	1	1,000	±3.1%
Ipsos/Reuters	June 18–22, 2016	43%	34%	6%	5%	9	1,339	±2.8%
CNN/ORC	June 16–19, 2016	42%	38%	9%	7%	4	891	±3.5%
Monmouth University	June 15–19, 2016	42%	36%	9%	4%	6	803	±3.5%
NBC News/SurveyMonkey	June 13–19, 2016	42%	38%	9%	5%	4	16,135	±1.1%
Ipsos/Reuters	June 11–15, 2016	39%	29%	6%	4%	10	1,323	±2.8%
NBC/Survey Monkey	June 6–12, 2016	42%	38%	9%	5%	4	10,604	±1.3%
SurveyUSA	June 8, 2016	39%	36%	6%	4%	3	1,408	±2.7%
Zogby	May 30 – June 5, 2016	40%	34%	6%	2%	6	837	±3.5%
NBC News	May 30 – June 5, 2016	39%	40%	9%	4%	1	9,240	±1.4%
Quinnipiac University	May 24–30, 2016	40%	38%	5%	3%	2	1,561	±2.5%

=== Five-way race ===
Poll source	Date	Hillary Clinton Democratic	Donald Trump Republican	Gary Johnson Libertarian	Jill Stein Green	Evan McMullin Independent	Leading by (points)	Sample size	Margin of error
Saint Leo University	October 22–26, 2016	42%	31%	6%	1%	5%	11	1,050	–
Public Policy Polling	September 27–28, 2016	44%	40%	6%	1%	2%	4	933	±3.2%
Echelon Insights	September 26–27, 2016	44%	39%	6%	2%	1%	5	1,833	–
Public Policy Polling	August 26–28, 2016	42%	37%	6%	4%	1%	5	881	±3.3%

== Post-election analysis ==
BBC News discussed whether polling should be abandoned due to its perceived failure. Forbes magazine contributor astrophysicist Ethan Siegel performed a scientific analysis and raised whether the statistical population sampled for the polling was inaccurate, and cited the cautionary adage "Garbage in, garbage out". He concluded there may have been sampling bias on the part of the pollsters. Siegel compared the 2016 election to the failure of prognosticator Arthur Henning in the "Dewey Defeats Truman" incident from the 1948 presidential election. Despite all this, however, nationwide polling was not far off from the actual popular vote result, and in fact very few states had results that deviated from the margin of error in the polling average. In a FiveThirtyEight article, Nate Silver defended the performance of the polls in 2016 as historically average, and argued that "Media organizations need to do a better job of informing their readers about the uncertainties associated with polling".

A particular case was the USC/Los Angeles Times Daybreak tracking poll, which was different from other polls as it had Donald Trump in the lead more often than not. The poll's findings caused skepticism, especially from other pollsters and media outlets, who have denounced it and often criticized the LA Times for running it. Before the election, Nate Silver deemed as positive the fact that the poll allowed people to assign themselves a probability of voting for either candidate instead of saying they're 100 percent sure, saying if people are "going to browbeat a pollster, [let's] do it to a pollster who is doing things cheaply—some of the robopolls qualify—and not one that’s trying to move the ball forward, like the LA Times poll." The LA Times concluded after the preliminary results of the election were published: "That doesn't necessarily mean that a poll conducted online, the way the Daybreak poll is, necessarily will be more accurate than polls conducted by phone. But it is yet another indication that polling needs more, diverse ways to look at public opinion, not fewer."

== See also ==
General election polling

- Nationwide opinion polling for the United States presidential election by demographics, 2016
- Statewide opinion polling for the United States presidential election, 2016
- International opinion polling for the United States presidential election, 2016

Democratic primary polling

- Nationwide opinion polling for the Democratic Party 2016 presidential primaries
- Statewide opinion polling for the Democratic Party presidential primaries, 2016

Republican primary polling

- Nationwide opinion polling for the Republican Party 2016 presidential primaries
- Statewide opinion polling for the Republican Party presidential primaries, 2016

After the election

- Opinion polling on the first Donald Trump administration
