= Statewide opinion polling for the 2016 Democratic Party presidential primaries =

This map shows which candidate is leading in the most recent opinion polling for each state. Key: Hillary Clinton 20 states Bernie Sanders 3 states Shared states (statistically tied) 20 states No polling data in the three months preceding the state's primary 7 states, 1 district/territory Note: This map reflects the latest opinion polling results, NOT the final actual result of the primaries/caucuses themselves. A map of the primaries' results is located at File:Democratic Party presidential primaries results, 2016.svg.

This article contains opinion polling by U.S. state for the 2016 Democratic Party presidential primaries. For currency and accuracy, please note the specific dates for each polling as listed below. For the significance of the earliest state votes, the Iowa caucuses and the New Hampshire primary, see United States presidential primary – Iowa and New Hampshire. To know when any given state votes, see the timeline of primaries and caucuses.

Note: A statistical tie occurs when two data points from within a set are within twice the margin of error of each other. When adding polls remember to double the margin of error provided to see the true result.

== Statewide polling ==
=== Alabama ===
Delegate count: 53 Pledged, 7 Unpledged Winner: Hillary Clinton
Primary date: March 1, 2016

| Poll source | Date | 1st | 2nd | Other |
|---|---|---|---|---|
| Primary results | March 1, 2016 | Hillary Clinton; 77.8% | Bernie Sanders; 19.2% | Other; 3.0% |
| Monmouth Margin of error: ± 5.8% Sample size: 300 | February 25–28, 2016 | Hillary Clinton; 71% | Bernie Sanders; 23% | Others / Undecided; 6% |
| Public Policy Polling Margin of error: ± 4.4; Sample size: 500 | February 14–16, 2016 | Hillary Clinton; 59% | Bernie Sanders; 31% | |
| News-5/Strategy Research Margin of error: ± 2 percent Sample size: 3,500 | August 11, 2015 | Hillary Clinton; 78% | Bernie Sanders 10% | |

=== Alaska ===
Delegate count: 16 Pledged, 4 Unpledged Winner: Bernie Sanders
Caucus date: March 26, 2016

| Poll source | Date | 1st | 2nd | Other |
|---|---|---|---|---|
| Caucus results | March 29, 2016 | Bernie Sanders; 79.6% | Hillary Clinton; 20.2% | Other; 0.2% |
| Alaska Dispatch News/Ivan Moore Research Margin of error: ± ≈3.8% Sample size: 651 | Published January 23, 2016 | Bernie Sanders; 48% | Hillary Clinton; 34% | Martin O'Malley 6% Undecided 14% |

=== Arizona ===
Delegate count: 75 Pledged, 10 Unpledged Winner: Hillary Clinton
Primary date: March 22, 2016

| Poll source | Date | 1st | 2nd | Other |
|---|---|---|---|---|
| Official Primary results | March 22, 2016 | Hillary Clinton; 56.3% | Bernie Sanders; 41.4% | Others; 2.3% |
| Merrill Poll Margin of error: ± 5.4% Sample size: 300 | March 7–11, 2016 | Hillary Clinton; 50% | Bernie Sanders; 24% | Others / Undecided; 26% |
| MBQF Consulting and Marson Media Margin of error: ± 3.6% Sample size: 739 | Published February 29, 2016 | Hillary Clinton; 56% | Bernie Sanders; 22% | Others / Undecided; 22% |
| Behavior Research Center Margin of error: ± 7.3% Sample size: 186 | October 24 – November 5, 2015 | Hillary Clinton; 47% | Bernie Sanders; 19% | Martin O'Malley 2% Uncommitted 32% |
| One America News Margin of error: ± 4.7% Sample size: 427 | Published August 17, 2015 | Hillary Clinton; 56% | Bernie Sanders; 34% | Joe Biden 6% Lincoln Chafee 2% Jim Webb 1% Martin O'Malley 1% |
| Public Policy Polling Margin of error: ± 6% Sample size: 268 | May 1–3, 2015 | Hillary Clinton; 58% | Bernie Sanders; 16% | Lincoln Chafee 5% Jim Webb 5% Martin O'Malley 4% Not sure 12% |

=== Arkansas ===
Delegate count: 32 Pledged, 5 Unpledged Winner: Hillary Clinton
Primary date: March 1, 2016

| Poll source | Date | 1st | 2nd | Other |
|---|---|---|---|---|
| Primary results | March 1, 2016 | Hillary Clinton; 66.1% | Bernie Sanders; 30.0% | Others; 4.0% |
| Public Policy Polling Margin of error: ± 4.3; Sample size: 525 | February 14–16, 2016 | Hillary Clinton; 57% | Bernie Sanders; 32% | |
| Talk Business/Hendrix Margin of error: ± 3.3% Sample size: 451 | February 4, 2016 | Hillary Clinton; 57% | Bernie Sanders; 25% | Don't Know 18% |
| Suffolk University Margin of error: ± ? Sample size: 209 | September 20–23, 2014 | Hillary Clinton; 71% | Joe Biden; 8% | Andrew Cuomo 5% Elizabeth Warren 3% Martin O’Malley 2% Undecided/Refused 10% |
| Polling Company/WomenTrend Margin of error: ± ? Sample size: ? | August 6–7, 2013 | Hillary Clinton; 59% | Joe Biden; 14% | Others/Undecided 27% |

=== California ===
Delegate count: 475 Pledged, 71 Unpledged Winner: Hillary Clinton
Primary date: June 7, 2016

| Poll source | Date | 1st | 2nd | Other |
|---|---|---|---|---|
| | June 7, 2016 | Hillary Clinton; 53.1% | Bernie Sanders; 46.0% | Others; 0.9% |
| CBS News/YouGov Margin of error: ±5.0% Sample size: 674 | May 31-June 3, 2016 | Hillary Clinton; 49% | Bernie Sanders; 47% | Others / Undecided 4% |
| American Research Group Margin of error: ± 5% Sample size: 400 | May 31 – June 2, 2016 | Hillary Clinton; 48% | Bernie Sanders; 47% | Others / Undecided; 5% |
| NBC/WSJ/Marist Margin of error: ±4.2% Sample size: 557 | May 29–31, 2016 | Hillary Clinton; 49% | Bernie Sanders; 47% | Others / Undecided 4% |
| Field Margin of error: ±4.1% Sample size: 571 | May 26–31, 2016 | Hillary Clinton; 45% | Bernie Sanders; 43% | Others / Undecided 12% |
| USC Dornsife/Los Angeles Times Margin of error: ± 2.9% Sample size: 1,500 | May 19–31, 2016 | Hillary Clinton; 49% | Bernie Sanders; 39% | Others / Undecided; 13% |
| SurveyUSA Margin of error: ±% Sample size: 803 | May 19–22, 2016 | Hillary Clinton; 57% | Bernie Sanders; 39% | Undecided 4% |
| PPIC Margin of error: ±5.7% Sample size: 552 | May 13–22, 2016 | Hillary Clinton; 46% | Bernie Sanders; 44% | Undecided 10% |
| Hoover Institution State Poll Margin of error: ±3.47% Sample size: 1,700 | May 4–16, 2016 | Hillary Clinton; 51% | Bernie Sanders; 38% | Others / Undecided; 11% |
| Sextant (D)/Capitol Weekly Margin of error: ±2.3% Sample size: 1,617 | April 28-May 1, 2016 | Hillary Clinton; 49% | Bernie Sanders; 39% | Others / Undecided; 12% |
| SurveyUSA/KABC/SCNG Margin of error: ± % Sample size: 826 | April 27–30, 2016 | Hillary Clinton; 57% | Bernie Sanders; 38% | Others / Undecided; 6% |
| FOX News Margin of error: ± 4% Sample size: 623 | April 18–21, 2016 | Hillary Clinton; 48% | Bernie Sanders; 46% | Others / Undecided; 6% |
| CBS News/YouGov Margin of error: ± 4.5% Sample size: 1,124 | April 13–15, 2016 | Hillary Clinton; 52% | Bernie Sanders; 40% | Others / Undecided; 8% |
| Gravis Marketing Margin of error: ± 3.4% Sample size: 846 | April 7–10, 2016 | Hillary Clinton; 47% | Bernie Sanders; 41% | Others / Undecided; 12% |
| Field Margin of error: ± 4.0% Sample size: 584 | March 24 - April 4, 2016 | Hillary Clinton; 47% | Bernie Sanders; 41% | Others / Undecided; 12% |
| SurveyUSA Margin of error: ± 3.6% Sample size: 767 | March 30 - April 3, 2016 | Hillary Clinton; 53% | Bernie Sanders; 39% | Others / Undecided; 8% |
| USC Dornsife/Los Angeles Times Margin of error: ± 3.7% Sample size: 832 | March 16–23, 2016 | Hillary Clinton; 47% | Bernie Sanders; 36% | Others / Undecided; 17% |
| PPIC Margin of error: ± 6.2% Sample size: 529 | March 6–15, 2016 | Hillary Clinton; 48% | Bernie Sanders; 41% | Others / Undecided; 11% |
| Field Poll Margin of error: ± 5.6% Sample Size: 329 | January 6, 2016 | Hillary Clinton; 46% | Bernie Sanders; 35% | Martin O'Malley 1% Undecided 18% |

Polls in 2015

| Poll source | Date | 1st | 2nd | Other |
|---|---|---|---|---|
| Field Poll Margin of error: ± 5.0% Sample size: 391 | September 17 – October 4, 2015 | Hillary Clinton; 47% | Bernie Sanders; 35% | Martin O'Malley 1% Jim Webb 1% Lincoln Chafee 0% Other 2% Undecided 14% |
| Field Poll Margin of error: ± 5.0% Sample size: 391 | September 17 – October 4, 2015 | Hillary Clinton; 40% | Bernie Sanders; 31% | Joe Biden 15% Martin O'Malley 1% Lincoln Chafee 0% Jim Webb 1% Other 2% Undecided 12% |
| USC/LA Times Margin of error: ± 3.6% Sample size: ? | August 29 – September 8, 2015 | Hillary Clinton; 42% | Bernie Sanders; 26% | Other/NA 16% Undecided 16% |
| USC/LA Times Margin of error: ± 3.6% Sample size: ? | August 29 – September 8, 2015 | Hillary Clinton; 39% | Bernie Sanders; 23% | Joe Biden 11% Other/NA 11% Undecided 16% |
| Field Poll Margin of error: ± 7.0% Sample size: 356 | April 23 – May 16, 2015 | Hillary Clinton; 53% | Elizabeth Warren; 13% | Joe Biden 6% Bernie Sanders 5% Jim Webb 1% Martin O'Malley 0% Lincoln Chafee 0% Undecided/other 22% |
| Emerson College Margin of error: ± ? Sample size: 487 | April 2–8, 2015 | Hillary Clinton; 56% | Elizabeth Warren; 11% | Joe Biden 8% Bernie Sanders 3% Martin O'Malley 2% Jim Webb 1% Andrew Cuomo 0% Other 2% Undecided 17% |
| Field Poll Margin of error: ± 5% Sample size: 425 | January 26 – February 16, 2015 | Hillary Clinton; 59% | Elizabeth Warren; 17% | Joe Biden 9% Bernie Sanders 6% Jim Webb 2% Others <0.5% Undecided 7% |

=== Colorado ===
Delegate count: 66 Pledged, 13 Unpledged Winner: Bernie Sanders
Caucus date: March 1, 2016

| Poll source | Date | 1st | 2nd | Other |
|---|---|---|---|---|
| Caucus results | March 1, 2016 | Bernie Sanders; 59.44% | Hillary Clinton; 39.85% | Other; 0.71% |
| Washington Free Beacon/TPC Research Margin of error: ± 3% Sample size: 1144 | February 16–17, 2016 | Bernie Sanders; 49% | Hillary Clinton; 43% | Undecided 9% |
| Quinnipiac University Margin of error: ± 4.9% Sample size: 404 | November 11–15, 2015 | Hillary Clinton; 55% | Bernie Sanders; 27% | Martin O'Malley 2% Undecided 15% |
| Suffolk University Margin of error: ± ? Sample size: 159 | September 13–16, 2014 | Hillary Clinton; 59% | Elizabeth Warren; 21% | Joe Biden 8% Andrew Cuomo 4% Martin O’Malley 0% Undecided 6% Other 2% Refused 1% |

=== Connecticut ===
Delegate count: 55 Pledged, 15 Unpledged Winner: Hillary Clinton
Primary date: April 26, 2016

| Poll source | Date | 1st | 2nd | Other |
|---|---|---|---|---|
| Official Primary results | April 26, 2016 | Hillary Clinton; 51.8% | Bernie Sanders; 46.4% | Others / Uncommitted; 1.8% |
| Public Policy Polling Margin of error: ± 3.7% Sample size: 709 | April 22–24, 2016 | Hillary Clinton; 48% | Bernie Sanders; 46% | Others / Undecided; 6% |
| Quinnipiac Margin of error: ± 3.0% Sample size: 1,037 | April 12–18, 2016 | Hillary Clinton; 51% | Bernie Sanders; 42% | Others / Undecided; 8% |
| Emerson College Margin of error: ± 5.2% Sample size: 356 | April 10–11, 2016 | Hillary Clinton; 49% | Bernie Sanders; 43% | Others / Undecided; 3% |
| Emerson College Polling Society Margin of error: ± 6% Sample size: 251 LV | November 17, 2015 | Hillary Clinton; 49.6% | Bernie Sanders; 30.7% | Martin O’Malley 9.1% Other 3.2% Undecided 6.6% |
| Quinnipiac University Margin of error: ± 4% Sample size: 610 | October 7–11, 2015 | Hillary Clinton; 35% | Bernie Sanders; 25% | Joe Biden 18% Lincoln Chafee 0% Lawrence Lessig 0% Martin O’Malley 0% Jim Webb 0% Other 1% Wouldn't vote 6% Undecided 12% |
| Quinnipiac University Margin of error: ± 4% Sample size: 610 | October 7–11, 2015 | Hillary Clinton; 47% | Bernie Sanders; 29% | Jim Webb 1% Lincoln Chafee 0% Lawrence Lessig 0% Martin O’Malley 0% Other 1% Wouldn't vote 6% Undecided 16% |
| Quinnipiac University Margin of error: ± 4.6% Sample size: 459 | March 6–9, 2015 | Hillary Clinton; 53% | Elizabeth Warren; 15% | Joe Biden 8% Bernie Sanders 2% Martin O’Malley 1% Jim Webb 1% Other 2% Wouldn't vote 3% Undecided 15% |

=== Delaware ===
Delegate count: 21 Pledged, 10 Unpledged Winner: Hillary Clinton
Primary date: April 26, 2016

| Poll source | Date | 1st | 2nd | Other |
|---|---|---|---|---|
| Official Primary results | April 26, 2016 | Hillary Clinton; 59.8% | Bernie Sanders; 39.2% | Other; 1.1% |
| Gravis Marketing Margin of error: ± 3.1% Sample size: 1,026 | April 17–18, 2016 | Hillary Clinton; 45% | Bernie Sanders; 38% | Others / Undecided; 17% |

=== Florida ===
Delegate count: 214 Pledged, 32 Unpledged Winner: Hillary Clinton
Primary date: March 15, 2016

| Poll source | Date | 1st | 2nd | Other |
|---|---|---|---|---|
| Official Primary results | March 15, 2016 | Hillary Clinton; 64.4% | Bernie Sanders; 33.3% | Other; 2.3% |
| ARG Margin of error: ± 5.0% Sample size: 400 | March 11–13, 2016 | Hillary Clinton; 58% | Bernie Sanders; 37% | Others / Undecided 5% |
| Quinnipiac Margin of error: ± 4.3% Sample size: 519 | March 8–13, 2016 | Hillary Clinton; 60% | Bernie Sanders; 34% | Others / Undecided 6% |
| Public Policy Polling Margin of error: ± 3.9% Sample size: 627 | March 11–12, 2016 | Hillary Clinton; 57% | Bernie Sanders; 32% | Others / Undecided 11% |
| CBS News/YouGov Margin of error: ± 4.5% Sample size: 796 | March 9–11, 2016 | Hillary Clinton; 62% | Bernie Sanders; 34% | Others / Undecided 4% |
| Florida Atlantic University Margin of error: ± 5% Sample size: 414 | March 8–11, 2016 | Hillary Clinton; 59% | Bernie Sanders; 31% | Others / Undecided 10% |
| NBC News/Wall Street Journal/Marist Margin of error: ± 4.4% Sample size: 500 | March 4–10, 2016 | Hillary Clinton; 61% | Bernie Sanders; 34% | Others / Undecided 5% |
| WTSP/Mason-Dixon Margin of error: ± 4.5% Sample size: 500 | March 7–9, 2016 | Hillary Clinton; 68% | Bernie Sanders; 23% | Others / Undecided 9% |
| Quinnipiac Margin of error: ± 4.3% Sample size: 511 | March 2–7, 2016 | Hillary Clinton; 62% | Bernie Sanders; 32% | Others / Undecided 6% |
| SurveyUSA/Bay News 9/News 13 Margin of error: ± 3.4% Sample size: 823 | March 4–6, 2016 | Hillary Clinton; 61% | Bernie Sanders; 30% | Others / Undecided 9% |
| CNN/ORC Margin of error: ± 6.0% Sample size: 264 | March 2–6, 2016 | Hillary Clinton; 61% | Bernie Sanders; 34% | Others / Undecided 5% |
| Wash Post/Univision Margin of error: ± 6.0% Sample size: 449 | March 2–5, 2016 | Hillary Clinton; 64% | Bernie Sanders; 26% | Others / Undecided 10% |
| University of North Florida Margin of error: ± 3.7% Sample size: 685 | February 22–27, 2016 | Hillary Clinton; 54% | Bernie Sanders; 24% | Others / Undecided 22% |
| Public Policy Polling Margin of error: ± 5% Sample size: 388 | February 24–25, 2016 | Hillary Clinton; 57% | Bernie Sanders; 32% | Others / Undecided 11% |
| Gravis Marketing Margin of error: ± 4.3% Sample size: 514 | February 24, 2016 | Hillary Clinton; 58% | Bernie Sanders; 42% | |
| Quinnipiac Margin of error: ± 4.5% Sample size: 476 | February 21–24, 2016 | Hillary Clinton; 59% | Bernie Sanders; 33% | Others / Undecided 8% |
| Florida Southern College Margin of error: ± 4.0% Sample Size: 608 | January 30 – February 6, 2016 | Hillary Clinton; 43% | Bernie Sanders; 26% | Others / Undecided 31% |
| Florida Atlantic University Margin of error: ± 5.0% Sample Size: 371 | January 15–18, 2016 | Hillary Clinton; 62% | Bernie Sanders; 26% | Martin O'Malley 2% Not Reported |

Polls in 2015

| Poll source | Date | 1st | 2nd | Other |
|---|---|---|---|---|
| Florida Atlantic University Margin of error: ± 5.2% Sample Size: 355 | November 15–16, 2015 | Hillary Clinton; 66% | Bernie Sanders; 22% | Martin O'Malley 4% Other 4.5% Undecided 3.7% |
| Bay News 9/ News13 Margin of error: ± 3.9% Sample size: 826 | October 28 – November 1, 2015 | Hillary Clinton; 66% | Bernie Sanders; 24% | Martin O'Malley 3% Other 2% Undecided 6% |
| Saint Leo University Polling Institute Margin of error: ±6.0% Sample size: 165 | October 17–22, 2015 | Hillary Clinton; 50.9% | Joe Biden 15.2% | Bernie Sanders 13.3% Unsure/Don't Know 8.5% |
| Quinnipiac University Margin of error: ± 4.8% Sample size: 411 | September 25 – October 5, 2015 | Hillary Clinton; 43% | Joe Biden; 19% | Bernie Sanders 19% Someone else/Undecided 13% |
| Public Policy Polling Margin of error: ± 5.1% Sample size: 368 | September 11–13, 2015 | Hillary Clinton; 55% | Bernie Sanders; 18% | Joe Biden 17% Martin O'Malley 2% Jim Webb 1% Lincoln Chafee 1% Lawrence Lessig 0% Someone else/Undecided 6% |
| Gravis Marketing Margin of error: ± 4% Sample size: 693 | September 5–11, 2015 | Hillary Clinton; 41.6% | Joe Biden; 21.4% | Bernie Sanders 12.5% Martin O'Malley 1.5% Jim Webb 1.3% Lincoln Chafee 0.4% Unsure 21.3% |
| Quinnipiac University Margin of error: ± 5% Sample size: 419 | Posted September 4, 2015 | Hillary Clinton; 52% | Bernie Sanders; 20% | Joe Biden 15% Lincoln Chafee 4% Martin O'Malley 1% Jim Webb 1% Other 1% Undecided 6% |
| Quinnipiac University Margin of error: ± 5.3% Sample size: 345 | August 7–18, 2015 | Hillary Clinton; 48% | Bernie Sanders; 15% | Joe Biden 11% Martin O'Malley 1% Jim Webb 1% Lincoln Chafee 0% Other 2% Wouldn't vote 6% Undecided 17% |
| St Pete Polls Margin of error: ± 3.0% Sample size: 1080 | July 18–28, 2015 | Hillary Clinton; 55% | Bernie Sanders; 29% | Jim Webb 2% Martin O'Malley 1% Lincoln Chafee <1% Unsure or someone else 13% |
| Mason-Dixon Margin of error: ± 4.5% Sample size: 500 | July 20–23, 2015 | Hillary Clinton; 58% | Bernie Sanders; 17% | Martin O'Malley 2% Lincoln Chafee 0% Jim Webb 0% Undecided 23% |
| Gravis Marketing Margin of error: ± 3% Sample size: 881 | June 16–20, 2015 | Hillary Clinton; 64.8% | Bernie Sanders; 20.6% | Martin O'Malley 2.1% Bill De Blasio 1.7% Jim Webb 0.9% Lincoln Chafee 0.4% Unsure 9.5% |
| Quinnipiac University Margin of error: ± 5% Sample size: 378 | June 4–15, 2015 | Hillary Clinton; 64% | Joe Biden; 9% | Bernie Sanders 8% Martin O'Malley 1% Lincoln Chafee 0% Jim Webb 0% Other 1% Wouldn't vote 5% Undecided 13% |
| Quinnipiac University Margin of error: ± 5.3% Sample size: 344 | March 17–28, 2015 | Hillary Clinton; 65% | Joe Biden; 11% | Elizabeth Warren 7% Bernie Sanders 3% Jim Webb 2% Martin O'Malley 0% Other 1% Wouldn't vote 2% Undecided 10% |
| Quinnipiac University Margin of error: ± 5.3% Sample size: 344 | March 17–28, 2015 | Joe Biden; 42% | Elizabeth Warren; 19% | Bernie Sanders 6% Jim Webb 3% Martin O'Malley 1% Other 2% Wouldn't vote 4% Undecided 22% |
| Public Policy Polling Margin of error: ± 5.1% Sample size: 371 | March 19–22, 2015 | Hillary Clinton; 58% | Joe Biden; 14% | Elizabeth Warren 10% Bernie Sanders 3% Martin O'Malley 2% Jim Webb 1% Other/Undecided 11% |
| Margin of error: ± 5% Sample size: 435 | February 24–25, 2015 | Hillary Clinton; 52% | Elizabeth Warren; 14% | Joe Biden 9% Martin O'Malley 2% Mark Warner 2% Jim Webb 2% Undecided 18% |
| Quinnipiac University Margin of error: ± 5.5% Sample size: 322 | January 22 – February 1, 2015 | Hillary Clinton; 61% | Joe Biden; 11% | Elizabeth Warren 9% Bernie Sanders 2% Martin O'Malley 1% Jim Webb 1% Other 2% Wouldn't vote 4% Undecided 10% |
| Quinnipiac University Margin of error: ± 5.5% Sample size: 322 | January 22 – February 1, 2015 | Joe Biden; 39% | Elizabeth Warren; 22% | Bernie Sanders 3% Martin O'Malley 2% Jim Webb 2% Other 4% Wouldn't vote 5% Undecided 23% |

Polls in 2014

| Poll source | Date | 1st | 2nd | Other |
|---|---|---|---|---|
| Quinnipiac University Margin of error: ± 4.6% Sample size: 457 | July 17–21, 2014 | Hillary Clinton; 67% | Joe Biden; 8% | Elizabeth Warren 8% Andrew Cuomo 1% Martin O'Malley 0% Brian Schweitzer 0% Other 1% Wouldn't vote 3% Undecided 11% |
| Public Policy Polling Margin of error: ± 6.2% Sample size: 251 | June 6–9, 2014 | Hillary Clinton; 66% | Elizabeth Warren; 8% | Joe Biden 7% Cory Booker 5% Andrew Cuomo 4% Mark Warner 1% Kirsten Gillibrand 0% Martin O'Malley 0% Brian Schweitzer 0% Someone else/Undecided 9% |
| Quinnipiac University Margin of error: ± 4.4% Sample size: 501 | April 23–28, 2014 | Hillary Clinton; 64% | Joe Biden; 11% | Elizabeth Warren 6% Andrew Cuomo 1% Martin O'Malley 1% Brian Schweitzer 1% Other 1% Wouldn't vote 3% Undecided 13% |
| Quinnipiac University Margin of error: ± 4.3% Sample size: 529 | January 22–27, 2014 | Hillary Clinton; 64% | Joe Biden; 9% | Elizabeth Warren 5% Andrew Cuomo 1% Martin O'Malley 1% Mark Warner 1% Other 2% Wouldn't vote 2% Undecided 16% |

Polls in 2013

| Poll source | Date | 1st | 2nd | Other |
|---|---|---|---|---|
| Quinnipiac University Margin of error: ± 4.2% Sample size: 544 | November 12–17, 2013 | Hillary Clinton; 70% | Joe Biden; 9% | Elizabeth Warren 4% Andrew Cuomo 2% Martin O'Malley 1% Mark Warner 1% Other 2% Wouldn't vote 2% Undecided 10% |
| Public Policy Polling Margin of error: ± 5.7% Sample size: 300 | March 15–18, 2013 | Hillary Clinton; 62% | Joe Biden; 12% | Andrew Cuomo 5% Elizabeth Warren 3% Martin O'Malley 1% Brian Schweitzer 1% Mark Warner 1% Kirsten Gillibrand 0% Deval Patrick 0% Someone Else/Undecided 14% |
| Public Policy Polling Margin of error: ± 4.9% Sample size: 401 | January 11–13, 2013 | Hillary Clinton; 65% | Joe Biden; 15% | Andrew Cuomo 4% Elizabeth Warren 4% Deval Patrick 1% Mark Warner 1% Kirsten Gillibrand 0% Martin O'Malley 0% Brian Schweitzer 0% Someone Else/Undecided 11% |
| Public Policy Polling Margin of error: ± 4.9% Sample size: 401 | January 11–13, 2013 | Andrew Cuomo; 22% | Elizabeth Warren; 15% | Deval Patrick 5% Martin O'Malley 4% Kirsten Gillibrand 3% Mark Warner 2% Brian Schweitzer 1% Someone Else/Undecided 48% |

=== Georgia ===
Delegate count: 102 Pledged, 15 Unpledged Winner: Hillary Clinton
Primary date: March 1, 2016

| Poll source | Date | 1st | 2nd | Other |
|---|---|---|---|---|
| Primary results | March 1, 2016 | Hillary Clinton; 71.3% | Bernie Sanders; 28.2% | Other 0.5% |
| SurveyMonkey Margin of error: ± ? Sample size: 961 | February 22–29, 2016 | Hillary Clinton; 59% | Bernie Sanders; 36% | Others / Undecided 5% |
| WSB-TV/Landmark Margin of error: ± 3.5; Sample size: 800 | February 28, 2016 | Hillary Clinton; 70% | Bernie Sanders; 23% | Others / Undecided 7% |
| WSB-TV/Landmark Margin of error: ± 3.5% Sample size: 800 | February 26, 2016 | Hillary Clinton; 68% | Bernie Sanders; 22% | Others / Undecided; 10% |
| YouGov/CBS News Margin of error: ± 8.6% Sample size: 492 | February 22–26, 2016 | Hillary Clinton; 63% | Bernie Sanders; 35% | Others / Undecided 2% |
| WABE 90.1 Margin of error: ± 4.1% Sample size: 400 | February 22–24, 2016 | Hillary Clinton; 62% | Bernie Sanders; 29% | Others / Undecided 9% |
| TEGNA/SurveyUSA Margin of error: ± 4.2% Sample size: 501 | February 22–23, 2016 | Hillary Clinton; 66% | Bernie Sanders; 27% | Others / Undecided 7% |
| FOX 5 Atlanta Margin of error: ± 4.4% Sample size: 491 | February 22–23, 2016 | Hillary Clinton; 57% | Bernie Sanders; 29% | Others / Undecided 14% |
| NBC News/Wall St. Jrnl Margin of error: ± 4.6% Sample size: 461 | February 18–23, 2016 | Hillary Clinton; 64% | Bernie Sanders; 30% | Others / Undecided 6% |
| WSB-TV/Landmark Margin of error: ± 3.7% Sample size: 700 | February 21, 2016 | Hillary Clinton; 72% | Bernie Sanders; 20% | Others / Undecided 8% |
| Public Policy Polling Margin of error: ± 4.4% Sample size: 500 | February 14–16, 2016 | Hillary Clinton; 60% | Bernie Sanders; 26% | |
| Landmark/RosettaStone Margin of error: ± 4.0% Sample size: 600 | February 4, 2016 | Hillary Clinton; 63.3% | Bernie Sanders; 21.5% | Undecided 15.2% |
| WXIA-TV/SurveyUSA Margin of error: ± 4.8% Sample size: 2075 | October 15–26, 2015 | Hillary Clinton; 73% | Bernie Sanders; 16% | Martin O'Malley 4% Undecided 5% |
| Opinion Savvy Margin of error: ± 4.8; Sample size: 413 | Published September 3, 2015 | Hillary Clinton; 51% | Bernie Sanders; 24% | Joe Biden 15% Lincoln Chafee 5% Martin O'Malley 0% Jim Webb 0% Someone else 1% Undecided 5% |

=== Hawaii ===
Delegate count: 53 Pledged, 7 Unpledged Delegate count: 25 Pledged, 9 Unpledged Winner: Bernie Sanders
Caucus date: March 26, 2016

| Poll source | Date | 1st | 2nd |
|---|---|---|---|
| Caucus results | April 26, 2016 | Bernie Sanders; 69.8% | Hillary Clinton; 30.0% |

No polls were conducted for the Hawaii Democratic caucuses

=== Idaho ===
Delegate count: 23 Pledged, 4 Unpledged Winner: Bernie Sanders
Caucus date: March 22, 2016

| Poll source | Date | 1st | 2nd | Other |
|---|---|---|---|---|
| Caucus results | March 24, 2016 | Bernie Sanders; 78.04% | Hillary Clinton; 21.21% | Other; 0.75% |
| Dan Jones & Associates Margin of error: ± 4.0% Sample size: 601 | February 17–26, 2016 | Bernie Sanders; 47% | Hillary Clinton; 45% | |
| Dan Jones & Associates Margin of error: ± 4.02% Sample size: 595 | October 28 – November 4, 2015 | Hillary Clinton; 55% | Bernie Sanders; 35% | Other candidates 4% Don't know 6% |
| Dan Jones & Associates Margin of error: ± 4% Sample size: 586 | September 22–30, 2015 | Hillary Clinton; 38% | Bernie Sanders; 36% | Joe Biden 16% Other/DK/NR 10% |
| Dan Jones & Associates Margin of error: ± ? Sample size: ? | Published August 9, 2015 | Hillary Clinton; 44% | Bernie Sanders; 22% | Joe Biden 15% Other/DK/NR 19% |
| Idaho Politics Weekly Margin of error: ± ? Sample size: ? | June 17 – July 1, 2015 | Hillary Clinton; 19% | Bernie Sanders; 12% | Joe Biden 10% Someone else 18% Don't know 32% |

=== Illinois ===
Delegate count: 156 Pledged, 26 Unpledged Winner: Hillary Clinton
Primary date: March 15, 2016

| Poll source | Date | 1st | 2nd | Other |
|---|---|---|---|---|
| Primary results | March 15, 2016 | Hillary Clinton; 50.6% | Bernie Sanders; 48.6% | Others; 0.8% |
| McKeon & Associates Margin of error: ± 4.1% Sample size: 428 | March 12, 2016 | Hillary Clinton; 31% | Bernie Sanders; 30% | Others / Undecided 39% |
| Public Policy Polling Margin of error: ± 3.9% Sample size: 627 | March 11–12, 2016 | Hillary Clinton; 48% | Bernie Sanders; 45% | Others / Undecided 7% |
| CBS News/YouGov Margin of error: ± 5.5% Sample size: 756 | March 9–11, 2016 | Bernie Sanders; 48% | Hillary Clinton; 46% | Others / Undecided 6% |
| NBC News/Wall Street Journal/Marist Margin of error: ± 4.3% Sample size: 529 | March 4–10, 2016 | Hillary Clinton; 51% | Bernie Sanders; 45% | Others / Undecided 4% |
| We Ask America Margin of error: ± 3.11% Sample size: 994 | March 7–8, 2016 | Hillary Clinton; 62% | Bernie Sanders; 25% | Others / Undecided 13% |
| Chicago Tribune Margin of error: ±4.1% Sample size: 600 | March 2–6, 2016 | Hillary Clinton; 67% | Bernie Sanders; 25% | Others / Undecided 8% |
| We Ask America Margin of error: ± 3.0; Sample size: 1,116 | February 24, 2016 | Hillary Clinton; 57% | Bernie Sanders; 28% | Others / Undecided 15% |
| The Simon Poll/SIU Margin of error: ± 5.6; Sample size: 306 | February 15–20, 2016 | Hillary Clinton; 51% | Bernie Sanders; 32% | Others / Undecided 17% |
| The Illinois Observer Margin of error: ± 4.23; Sample size: 560 | February 11, 2016 | Hillary Clinton; 58% | Bernie Sanders; 25% | Others / Undecided 18% |
| Public Policy Polling Margin of error: ± 4.9% Sample size: 409 | July 20–21, 2015 | Hillary Clinton; 60% | Bernie Sanders; 23% | Others / Undecided 17% |

=== Indiana ===
Delegate count: 83 Pledged, 9 Unpledged Winner: Bernie Sanders
Primary date: May 3, 2016

| Poll source | Date | 1st | 2nd | Other |
|---|---|---|---|---|
| Official Primary Results | May 3, 2016 | Bernie Sanders; 52.5% | Hillary Clinton; 47.5% | |
| ARG Margin of error: ± 5% Sample size: 400 | April 27–28, 2016 | Hillary Clinton; 51% | Bernie Sanders; 43% | Others / Undecided; 6% |
| NBC/WSJ/Marist Margin of error: ± 3.9% Sample size: 645 | April 26–28, 2016 | Hillary Clinton; 50% | Bernie Sanders; 46% | Others / Undecided; 4% |
| IPFW/Mike Downs Center Margin of error: ± 4.9% Sample size: 400 | April 13–27, 2016 | Hillary Clinton; 55% | Bernie Sanders; 40% | Others / Undecided; 5% |
| IPFW/Downs Center Margin of error: ± 4.9% Sample size: 400 | April 18–23, 2016 | Hillary Clinton; 54% | Bernie Sanders; 41% | Others / Undecided; 5% |
| CBS/YouGov Margin of error: ± 8.2% Sample size: 439 | April 20–22, 2016 | Hillary Clinton; 49% | Bernie Sanders; 44% | Others / Undecided; 7% |
| FOX News Margin of error: ± 4% Sample size: 603 | April 18–21, 2016 | Hillary Clinton; 46% | Bernie Sanders; 42% | Others / Undecided; 12% |
| WTHR News Margin of error: ± 4.47% Sample size: 500 | April 18–21, 2016 | Hillary Clinton; 48% | Bernie Sanders; 45% | Others / Undecided; 7% |

=== Iowa ===
Delegate count: 44 Pledged, 8 Unpledged Winner: Hillary Clinton
Caucus date: February 1, 2016

| Poll source | Date | 1st | 2nd | Other |
|---|---|---|---|---|
| Caucus results | February 1, 2016 | Hillary Clinton; 49.9% | Bernie Sanders; 49.6% | Martin O'Malley 0.6% |
| Emerson College; Margin of error: ± 5.6% Sample size: 300 | January 29–31, 2016 | Hillary Clinton; 51% | Bernie Sanders; 43% | Martin O'Malley 4% Undecided 2% |
| Quinnipiac University; Margin of error: ± 3.2% Sample size: 919 | January 25–31, 2016 | Bernie Sanders; 49% | Hillary Clinton; 46% | Martin O'Malley 3% Undecided 2% |
| Des Moines Register– Bloomberg–Selzer; Margin of error: ± 4% Sample size: 602 | January 26–29, 2016 | Hillary Clinton; 45% | Bernie Sanders; 42% | Martin O'Malley 3% Undecided or Not Committed 9% |
| Public Policy Polling Margin of error ± 3.4% Sample size: 851 | January 26–27, 2016 | Hillary Clinton; 48% | Bernie Sanders; 40% | Martin O'Malley 7% No preference 5% |
| Gravis Marketing Margin of error ± 3% Sample size: 810 | January 26–27, 2016 | Hillary Clinton; 53% | Bernie Sanders; 42% | Martin O'Malley 5% No preference 0% |
| Monmouth University Margin of error ± 4.4% Sample size: 504 | January 23–26, 2016 | Hillary Clinton; 47% | Bernie Sanders; 42% | Martin O'Malley 6% Undecided 5% |
| American Research Group Margin of error ± 5.0% Sample size: 400 | January 21–24, 2016 | Bernie Sanders; 48% | Hillary Clinton; 45% | Martin O'Malley 3% No preference 4% |
| Quinnipiac University Margin of error: ± 4% Sample size: 606 | January 18–24, 2016 | Bernie Sanders; 49% | Hillary Clinton; 45% | Martin O'Malley 4% Undecided 2% |
| ISU/WHO-HD Margin of error: ± Sample size: 356 | January 5–22, 2016 | Hillary Clinton; 47% | Bernie Sanders; 45% | Martin O'Malley <1% Undecided 7% |
| Fox News Margin of error ± 4.5% Sample size: 432 | January 18–21, 2016 | Hillary Clinton; 48% | Bernie Sanders; 42% | Martin O'Malley 3% No preference 7% |
| YouGov/CBS News Margin of error ± 8.9% Sample size: 906 | January 17–21, 2016 | Bernie Sanders; 47% | Hillary Clinton; 46% | Martin O'Malley 5% No preference 2% |
| Emerson College Polling Society Margin of error: ± 5.9% Sample size: 271 | January 18–20, 2016 | Hillary Clinton; 52% | Bernie Sanders; 43% | Martin O'Malley 3% Undecided 2% |
| CNN/ORC Margin of error: ± 6% Sample size: 280 | January 15–20, 2016 | Bernie Sanders; 51% | Hillary Clinton; 43% | Martin O'Malley 4% Undecided 2% |
| Monmouth College/KBUR Margin of error: ± 4.1% Sample size: 500 | January 18–19, 2016 | Hillary Clinton; 47.7% | Bernie Sanders; 39.3% | Martin O'Malley 7.4% Undecided 5% |
| Loras College Margin of error: ± 4.4% Sample size: 580 | January 8–10, 2016 | Hillary Clinton; 46% | Bernie Sanders; 40% | Martin O'Malley 8% Undecided 5% |
| Public Policy Polling Margin of error: ± 4.1% Sample size: 580 | January 8–10, 2016 | Hillary Clinton; 46% | Bernie Sanders; 40% | Martin O'Malley 8% Undecided 5% |
| Bloomberg/DMR Margin of error: ± 4.4% Sample size: 503 | January 7–10, 2016 | Hillary Clinton; 42% | Bernie Sanders; 40% | Martin O'Malley 4% Other/Undecided 14% |
| American Research Group Margin of error: ± 4.0% Sample size: 600 | January 6–10, 2016 | Bernie Sanders; 47% | Hillary Clinton; 44% | Martin O'Malley 3% Undecided 5% |
| Quinnipiac University Margin of error: ± 4.4% Sample size: 492 | January 5–10, 2016 | Bernie Sanders; 49% | Hillary Clinton; 44% | Martin O'Malley 4% Undecided 3% |
| Mason-Dixon/AARP Margin of error: ± Sample size: 503 | January 4–8, 2016 | Hillary Clinton; 49% | Bernie Sanders; 42% | Martin O’Malley 5% Not Reported 4% |
| NBC News/WSJ/Marist Margin of error: ± 4.8% Sample size: 422 | January 2–7, 2016 | Hillary Clinton; 48% | Bernie Sanders; 45% | Martin O’Malley 5% Undecided 3% |

Polls in 2015

| Poll source | Date | 1st | 2nd | Other |
|---|---|---|---|---|
| Gravis Marketing Margin of error ± 5% Sample Size: 418 | December 18–21, 2015 | Hillary Clinton; 49% | Bernie Sanders; 31% | Martin O'Malley 10% Unsure 10% |
| YouGov/CBS News Margin of error ± 5.3% Sample Size: 1252 | December 14–17, 2015 | Hillary Clinton; 50% | Bernie Sanders; 45% | Martin O'Malley 4% No preference 1% |
| Public Policy Polling Margin of error: ± 4.3% Sample Size: 526 | December 10–13, 2015 | Hillary Clinton; 52% | Bernie Sanders; 34% | Martin O'Malley 7% Undecided 6% |
| Quinnipiac University Margin of error: ± 3.6% Sample Size: 727 | December 4–13, 2015 | Hillary Clinton; 51% | Bernie Sanders; 40% | Martin O'Malley 6% Undecided 3% |
| Fox News Margin of error: ± 5.0% Sample Size: 357 | December 7–10, 2015 | Hillary Clinton; 50% | Bernie Sanders; 36% | Martin O'Malley 5% Other 4% Undecided 10% |
| Loras College Margin of error: ± 4.4; Sample Size: 501 | December 7–10, 2015 | Hillary Clinton; 59% | Bernie Sanders; 27% | Martin O'Malley 4% Undecided 10% |
| Des Moines Register/Bloomberg/Selzer Margin of error ± 4.9% Sample Size: 404 | December 7–10, 2015 | Hillary Clinton; 48% | Bernie Sanders; 39% | Martin O'Malley 4% Undeicded 8% |
| Monmouth Margin of error ± 4.9% Sample Size: 405 | December 3–6, 2015 | Hillary Clinton; 55% | Bernie Sanders; 33% | Martin O'Malley 6% |
| CNN/ORC Margin of error ± 4.5% Sample Size: 442 | November 28 – December 6, 2015 | Hillary Clinton; 54% | Bernie Sanders; 36% | Martin O'Malley 4% |
| Quinnipiac University Margin of error ± 4.2% Sample Size: 543 | November 16–22, 2015 | Hillary Clinton; 51% | Bernie Sanders; 42% | Martin O'Malley 4% Undecided 3% |
| YouGov/CBS News Margin of error ± 7.6% Sample Size: 602 | November 15–19, 2015 | Hillary Clinton; 50% | Bernie Sanders; 44% | Martin O'Malley 5% Undecided 1% |
| CNN/ORC Margin of error ± 4.5% Sample Size: 498 | October 29 – November 4, 2015 | Hillary Clinton; 55% | Bernie Sanders; 37% | Martin O'Malley 3% None 1% No Opinion 3% |
| Gravis Marketing/One America News Network Margin of error ± 3.0% Sample Size: 272 | October 30 – November 2, 2015 | Hillary Clinton; 57.1% | Bernie Sanders; 24.8% | Martin O'Malley 2.9% Not Sure 15.2% |
| Public Policy Polling Margin of error ± 3.9% Sample Size: 615 | October 30 – November 1, 2015 | Hillary Clinton; 57% | Bernie Sanders; 25% | Martin O'Malley 7% Lawrence Lessig 1% Not Sure 9% |
| KBUR-Monmouth Margin of error: ± 3.76% Sample size: 681 | October 29–31, 2015 | Hillary Clinton; 45.8% | Bernie Sanders; 31.7% | Martin O'Malley 5.4% Undecided 17.0% |
| Monmouth University Margin of error ± 3.76% Sample size: 681 | October 29–31, 2015 | Hillary Clinton; 45.8% | Bernie Sanders; 31.7% | Martin O'Malley 5.4% Undecided 17% |
| Monmouth University Margin of error ± 4.9% Sample size: 400 | October 22–25, 2015 | Hillary Clinton; 65% | Bernie Sanders; 24% | Martin O'Malley 5% Lawrence Lessig 1% Undecided 5% |
| YouGov/CBS News Margin of error ± 6.9% Sample size: 555 | October 15–22, 2015 | Hillary Clinton; 46% | Bernie Sanders; 43% | Martin O'Malley 3% Lincoln Chafee 1% Lawrence Lessig 0% No preference 7% |
| Des Moines Register/Bloomberg Politics Margin of error ± 4.9% Sample size: 402 | October 16–19, 2015 | Hillary Clinton; 48% | Bernie Sanders; 41% | Martin O'Malley 2% Jim Webb 1% Lincoln Chafee 1% Uncommited 3% Not Sure 4% |
| NBC News/WSJ/Marist Margin of error: ± 5.3% Sample size: 348 | September 23–30, 2015 | Hillary Clinton; 33% | Bernie Sanders; 28% | Joe Biden 22% Martin O'Malley 3% Jim Webb 1% Lincoln Chafee <1% Undecided 12% |
| NBC News/WSJ/Marist Margin of error: ± 5.3% Sample size: 348 | September 23–30, 2015 | Hillary Clinton; 47% | Bernie Sanders; 36% | Martin O'Malley 4% Jim Webb 1% Lincoln Chafee <1% Undecided 13% |
| Public Policy Polling Margin of error ± 4.4% Sample size: 494 | September 18–20, 2015 | Hillary Clinton; 43% | Bernie Sanders; 22% | Joe Biden 17% Martin O'Malley 3% Jim Webb 3% Lincoln Chafee 2% Lawrence Lessig 0% Undecided 9% |
| YouGov/CBS News Margin of error ± 6.6% Sample size: 646 | September 3–10, 2015 | Bernie Sanders; 43% | Hillary Clinton; 33% | Joe Biden 10% No preference 7% Martin O'Malley 5% Lincoln Chafee 1% Jim Webb 1% |
| Quinnipiac University Margin of error: ± 3.4% Sample size: 832 | Posted September 10, 2015 | Bernie Sanders; 41% | Hillary Clinton; 40% | Joe Biden 12% Martin O'Malley 3% |
| NBC News/Marist Poll Margin of error: ± 5.3% Sample size: 345 | Published September 6, 2015 | Hillary Clinton; 38% | Bernie Sanders; 27% | Joe Biden 20% Martin O'Malley 4% Jim Webb 2% Lincoln Chafee 1% Undecided 8% |
| NBC News/Marist Poll Margin of error: ± 5.3% Sample size: 345 | Published September 6, 2015 | Hillary Clinton; 48% | Bernie Sanders; 37% | Martin O'Malley 4% Jim Webb 2% Lincoln Chafee 1% Undecided 8% |
| Loras College Margin of error ± 4.37% Sample size: 502 | August 24–27, 2015 | Hillary Clinton; 48.2% | Bernie Sanders; 22.9% | Joe Biden 16.3% Martin O'Malley 4% Lincoln Chafee 0.6% Jim Webb 0.4% Undecided 6.4% |
| Selzer & Co. of Des Moines Margin of error: ± 4.9% Sample size: 404 | August 23–26, 2015 | Hillary Clinton; 43% | Bernie Sanders; 35% | Martin O'Malley 5% Jim Webb 2% Lincoln Chafee 1% Not sure 8% Uncommitted 6% |
| Selzer & Co. of Des Moines Margin of error: ± 4.9% Sample size: 404 | August 23–26, 2015 | Hillary Clinton; 37% | Bernie Sanders; 30% | Joe Biden 14% Martin O'Malley 3% Jim Webb 2% Lincoln Chafee 1% Not sure 8% Uncommitted 6% |
| Suffolk University Margin of error: ± 4.4% Sample size: 500 | August 20–24, 2015 | Hillary Clinton; 54% | Bernie Sanders; 20% | Joe Biden 11% Martin O'Malley 4% Jim Webb 1% Lincoln Chafee 0% Undecided 9% |
| CNN/ORC Margin of error: ± 4.5% Sample size: 429 | August 7–11, 2015 | Hillary Clinton; 50% | Bernie Sanders; 31% | Joe Biden 12% Martin O'Malley 1% Jim Webb 1% Lincoln Chafee 0% Not sure 11% |
| Public Policy Polling Margin of error: ± 4.1% Sample size: 567 | August 7–9, 2015 | Hillary Clinton; 52% | Bernie Sanders; 25% | Martin O'Malley 7% Jim Webb 3% Lincoln Chafee 1% Not sure 11% |
| NBC News/Marist Margin of error: ± 5.5% Sample size: 320 | July 14–21, 2015 | Hillary Clinton; 49% | Bernie Sanders; 25% | Joe Biden 10% Martin O'Malley 3% Jim Webb 1% Lincoln Chafee <1% Undecided 11% |
| We Ask America Margin of error: 3.07% Sample size: 1,022 | June 27–29, 2015 | Hillary Clinton; 63% | Bernie Sanders; 20% | Martin O'Malley 5% Jim Webb 3% Lincoln Chafee 1% Undecided 8% |
| Quinnipiac University Margin of error: 3.6% Sample size: 761 | June 20–29, 2015 | Hillary Clinton; 52% | Bernie Sanders; 33% | Joe Biden 7% Martin O'Malley 3% Jim Webb 1% Lincoln Chafee 0% Undecided 5% |
| Bloomberg Margin of error: 4.9% Sample size: 401 | June 19–22, 2015 | Hillary Clinton; 50% | Bernie Sanders; 24% | Martin O'Malley 2% Lincoln Chafee 0% Undecided 23% |
| Morning Consult Margin of error: ? Sample size: 322 | May 31 – June 8, 2015 | Hillary Clinton; 54% | Bernie Sanders; 12% | Joe Biden 9% Martin O'Malley 1% Jim Webb 1% Lincoln Chafee 0% Other 3% Undecided 20% |
| Gravis Marketing Margin of error: ± 5.0% Sample size: 434 | May 28–29, 2015 | Hillary Clinton; 59% | Bernie Sanders; 15% | Martin O'Malley 3% Jim Webb 2% Bill DeBlasio 2% Lincoln Chafee 1% Unsure 17% |
| Bloomberg/Des Moines Margin of error: ± 4.7% Sample size: 437 | May 25–29, 2015 | Hillary Clinton; 57% | Bernie Sanders; 16% | Joe Biden 8% Martin O'Malley 2% Jim Webb 2% Uncommitted 6% Not sure 8% |
| Quinnipiac University Margin of error: ± 3.7% Sample size: 692 | April 25 – May 4, 2015 | Hillary Clinton; 60% | Bernie Sanders; 15% | Joe Biden 11% Martin O'Malley 3% Jim Webb 3% Lincoln Chafee 0% Undecided 7% |
| Public Policy Polling Margin of error: ± 4.5% Sample size: 466 | April 23–26, 2015 | Hillary Clinton; 62% | Bernie Sanders; 14% | Martin O'Malley 6% Jim Webb 3% Lincoln Chafee 2% Undecided 13% |
| Loras College Margin of error: ± 4.4% Sample size: 491 | April 21–23, 2015 | Hillary Clinton; 57% | Elizabeth Warren; 14.7% | Joe Biden 5.9% Martin O'Malley 2.4% Bernie Sanders 2% Jim Webb 1.2% Lincoln Chafee 0% Undecided 16.7% |
| Quinnipiac Margin of error: ± 3.9% Sample size: 619 | February 16–23, 2015 | Hillary Clinton; 61% | Elizabeth Warren; 19% | Joe Biden 7% Bernie Sanders 5% Jim Webb 2% Martin O'Malley 0% Undecided 6% |
| NBC News/Marist Margin of error: ± 5.5% Sample size: 321 | February 3–10, 2015 | Hillary Clinton; 68% | Joe Biden; 12% | Bernie Sanders 7% Jim Webb 1% Martin O'Malley <1% Undecided 12% |
| Selzer & Co. Margin of error: ± 4.9% Sample size: 401 | January 26–29, 2015 | Hillary Clinton; 56% | Elizabeth Warren; 16% | Joe Biden 9% Bernie Sanders 5% Jim Webb 3% Martin O'Malley 1% Uncommitted 4% Not sure 6% |
| Loras College Margin of error: ± 6.06% Sample size: 261 | January 21–26, 2015 | Hillary Clinton; 48.3% | Elizabeth Warren; 16.5% | Joe Biden 12.6% Bernie Sanders 3.8% Jim Webb 2.3% Martin O'Malley 0.4% Undecided 16.1% |

Polls in 2014

| Poll source | Date | 1st | 2nd | Other |
|---|---|---|---|---|
| Fox News Margin of error: ± 5% Sample size: 352 | October 28–30, 2014 | Hillary Clinton; 62% | Elizabeth Warren; 14% | Joe Biden 10% Andrew Cuomo 2% Martin O'Malley 2% Other 1% None of the above 2% Don't know 6% |
| Reuters/Ipsos Margin of error: ± ? Sample size: 552 | October 23–29, 2014 | Hillary Clinton; 60% | Elizabeth Warren; 17% | Joe Biden 4% Andrew Cuomo 3% Bernie Sanders 2% Kirsten Gillibrand 1% Martin O'Malley 1% Wouldn't vote 12% |
| Selzer & Co. Margin of error: ± 4.8% Sample size: 426 | October 1–7, 2014 | Hillary Clinton; 53% | Elizabeth Warren; 10% | Joe Biden 9% John Kerry 7% Bernie Sanders 3% Andrew Cuomo 1% Brian Schweitzer 1% Jim Webb 1% Martin O'Malley 0% Uncommitted 3% Not sure 12% |
| CNN/ORC Margin of error: ± 5.5% Sample size: 309 | September 8–10, 2014 | Hillary Clinton; 53% | Joe Biden; 15% | Elizabeth Warren 7% Bernie Sanders 5% Andrew Cuomo 3% Martin O'Malley 2% Deval Patrick 1% Someone else 1% None/No opinion 15% |
| Suffolk Margin of error: ± 7.09% Sample size: 191 | August 23–26, 2014 | Hillary Clinton; 66.49% | Elizabeth Warren; 9.95% | Joe Biden 7.85% Andrew Cuomo 4.19% Martin O'Malley 2.09% Undecided 7.85% |
| NBC News/Marist Margin of error: ± 4.2% Sample size: 539 | July 7–13, 2014 | Hillary Clinton; 70% | Joe Biden; 20% | Undecided 10% |
| Vox Populi Polling Margin of error: ± 6.6% Sample size: 223 | June 4–5, 2014 | Hillary Clinton; 65% | Joe Biden; 18% | Elizabeth Warren 12% Andrew Cuomo 3% Martin O'Malley 2% |
| Public Policy Polling Margin of error: ±5.2% Sample size: 356 | May 15–19, 2014 | Hillary Clinton; 59% | Joe Biden; 12% | Elizabeth Warren 11% Cory Booker 3% Andrew Cuomo 3% Mark Warner 2% Kirsten Gillibrand 1% Martin O'Malley 1% Brian Schweitzer 1% Someone else/Not sure 8% |
| Public Policy Polling Margin of error: ±5.2% Sample size: 356 | May 15–19, 2014 | Joe Biden; 34% | Elizabeth Warren; 22% | Andrew Cuomo 7% Cory Booker 4% Kirsten Gillibrand 3% Martin O'Malley 2% Brian Schweitzer 1% Mark Warner 1% Someone else/Not sure 26% |
| Public Policy Polling Margin of error: ±5.2% Sample size: 356 | May 15–19, 2014 | Elizabeth Warren; 31% | Andrew Cuomo; 14% | Cory Booker 9% Kirsten Gillibrand 5% Martin O'Malley 2% Mark Warner 2% Brian Schweitzer 1% Someone else/Not sure 36% |
| Suffolk Margin of error: ± 8.4% Sample size: 135 | April 3–8, 2014 | Hillary Clinton; 62.96% | Elizabeth Warren; 11.85% | Joe Biden 9.63% Mark Warner 1.48% Andrew Cuomo 0.74% Deval Patrick 0.74% Cory Booker 0% Undecided 11.85% |
| Public Policy Polling Margin of error: ±5.4% Sample size: 335 | February 20–23, 2014 | Hillary Clinton; 67% | Joe Biden; 12% | Elizabeth Warren 5% Mark Warner 3% Andrew Cuomo 2% Cory Booker 1% Kirsten Gillibrand 0% Martin O'Malley 0% Brian Schweitzer 0% Someone Else/Undecided 10% |
| Public Policy Polling Margin of error: ±5.4% Sample size: 335 | February 20–23, 2014 | Joe Biden; 40% | Elizabeth Warren; 13% | Andrew Cuomo 8% Martin O'Malley 5% Cory Booker 2% Kirsten Gillibrand 2% Mark Warner 2% Brian Schweitzer 1% Someone Else/Undecided 28% |
| Public Policy Polling Margin of error: ±5.4% Sample size: 335 | February 20–23, 2014 | Elizabeth Warren; 21% | Andrew Cuomo; 11% | Cory Booker 8% Martin O'Malley 6% Kirsten Gillibrand 3% Brian Schweitzer 2% Mark Warner 2% Someone Else/Undecided 47% |

Polls in 2013

| Poll source | Date | 1st | 2nd | Other |
|---|---|---|---|---|
| Cygnal Margin of error: ±2.1% Sample size: 2,175 | July 10–12, 2013 | Hillary Clinton; 55.6% | Joe Biden; 7.8% | Elizabeth Warren 5% Andrew Cuomo 1.1% Kirsten Gillibrand 0.5% Martin O'Malley 0.2% Unsure 29.7% |
| Public Policy Polling Margin of error: ±6.1% Sample size: 260 | July 5–7, 2013 | Hillary Clinton; 71% | Joe Biden; 12% | Elizabeth Warren 5% Kirsten Gillibrand 2% Mark Warner 2% Cory Booker 1% Andrew Cuomo 1% Martin O'Malley 1% Brian Schweitzer 0% Someone Else/Undecided 5% |
| Public Policy Polling Margin of error: ±6.1% Sample size: 260 | July 5–7, 2013 | Joe Biden; 51% | Elizabeth Warren; 16% | Andrew Cuomo 9% Cory Booker 6% Kirsten Gillibrand 2% Martin O'Malley 2% Mark Warner 1% Brian Schweitzer 0% Someone Else/Undecided 13% |
| Public Policy Polling Margin of error: ±6.1% Sample size: 260 | July 5–7, 2013 | Elizabeth Warren; 20% | Andrew Cuomo; 18% | Cory Booker 12% Kirsten Gillibrand 7% Martin O'Malley 4% Brian Schweitzer 3% Mark Warner 2% Someone Else/Undecided 33% |
| Public Policy Polling Margin of error: ±5.5% Sample size: 313 | February 1–3, 2013 | Hillary Clinton; 68% | Joe Biden; 21% | Andrew Cuomo 2% Mark Warner 2% Elizabeth Warren 2% Deval Patrick 1% Kirsten Gillibrand 0% Martin O'Malley 0% Brian Schweitzer 0% Someone Else/Undecided 3% |
| Public Policy Polling Margin of error: ±5.5% Sample size: 313 | February 1–3, 2013 | Joe Biden; 58% | Andrew Cuomo; 13% | Elizabeth Warren 7% Kirsten Gillibrand 6% Deval Patrick 3% Mark Warner 2% Brian Schweitzer 1% Martin O'Malley 0% Someone Else/Undecided 11% |
| Public Policy Polling Margin of error: ±5.5% Sample size: 313 | February 1–3, 2013 | Andrew Cuomo; 26% | Elizabeth Warren; 17% | Martin O'Malley 8% Kirsten Gillibrand 5% Deval Patrick 3% Brian Schweitzer 2% Mark Warner 2% Someone Else/Undecided 37% |
| Harper Polling Margin of error: Sample size: 183 | January 29, 2013 | Hillary Clinton; 65.38% | Joe Biden; 13.74% | Andrew Cuomo 3.85% Undecided 17.03% |

=== Kansas ===
Delegate count: 33 Pledged, 4 Unpledged Winner: Bernie Sanders
Caucus date: March 5, 2016

| Poll source | Date | 1st | 2nd | 3rd | Other |
|---|---|---|---|---|---|
| Caucus results | March 5, 2016 | Bernie Sanders; 67.9% | Hillary Clinton; 32.1% | Uncommitted; 0.0% | |
| Fort Hays State University Margin of error: ± 5.0; Sample size: 440 | February 19–26, 2016 | Hillary Clinton; 33% | Bernie Sanders; 23% | | Undecided 44% |
| Suffolk University Margin of error: ± ? Sample size: 118 | September 27–30, 2014 | Hillary Clinton; 62% | Elizabeth Warren; 14% | Joe Biden; 4% | Andrew Cuomo 4%, Martin O'Malley 1%, Other 2%, Undecided/Refused 14% |

=== Kentucky ===
Delegate count: 55 Pledged, 5 Unpledged Winner: Hillary Clinton
Primary date: May 17, 2016

| Poll source | Date | 1st | 2nd | 3rd | Other |
|---|---|---|---|---|---|
| Official Primary results | May 17, 2016 | Hillary Clinton; 46.8% | Bernie Sanders; 46.3% | | Others / Uncommitted; 6.9% |
| Public Policy Polling Margin of error: ± 4.4% Sample size: 501 | March 1–2, 2016 | Hillary Clinton; 43% | Bernie Sanders; 38% | | Others / Undecided; 19% |
| Public Policy Polling Margin of error: ± 4% Sample size: 610 | June 18–21, 2015 | Hillary Clinton; 56% | Bernie Sanders; 12% | Jim Webb; 7% | Lincoln Chafee 5%, Martin O'Malley 3%, Not sure 18% |

=== Louisiana ===
Delegate count: 51 Pledged, 8 Unpledged Winner: Hillary Clinton
Primary date: March 5, 2016

| Poll source | Date | 1st | 2nd | 3rd | Other |
|---|---|---|---|---|---|
| Certified Primary results | March 5, 2016 | Hillary Clinton; 71.1% | Bernie Sanders; 23.2% | | Others; 5.7% |
| Magellan Strategies Margin of error: ± 3.3% Sample size: 865 | March 1, 2016 | Hillary Clinton; 61% | Bernie Sanders; 14% | | Others / Undecided; 25% |
| Public Policy Polling Margin of error: ± 4.4; Sample size: 500 | February 14–16, 2016 | Hillary Clinton; 60% | Bernie Sanders; 29% | | |
| WWL-TV-Clarus Margin of error: ? Sample size: ? | September 20–23, 2015 | Hillary Clinton; 57% | Joe Biden; 22% | Bernie; Sanders; 7% | Martin O'Malley 2%, Jim Webb 1%, Lincoln Chafee 0% |

=== Maine ===
Delegate count: 25 Pledged, 5 Unpledged Winner: Bernie Sanders
Primary date: March 6, 2016

| Poll source | Date | 1st | 2nd | Other |
|---|---|---|---|---|
| Caucus results | March 6, 2016 | Bernie Sanders; 64.3 | Hillary Clinton; 35.5% | Other; 0.2% |
| Critical Insights Margin of error: 4% Sample size: 600 | September 24–30, 2015 | Bernie Sanders; 28% | Hillary Clinton; 27% | Other/DK/NR 45% |

=== Maryland ===
Delegate count: 95 Pledged, 23 Unpledged Winner: Hillary Clinton
Primary date: April 26, 2016

| Poll source | Date | 1st | 2nd | 3rd | Other |
|---|---|---|---|---|---|
| Official Primary results | April 26, 2016 | Hillary Clinton; 62.5% | Bernie Sanders; 33.8% | | Others / Uncommitted; 3.7% |
| ARG Margin of error: ± 5.0% Sample size: 400 | April 21–24, 2016 | Hillary Clinton; 50% | Bernie Sanders; 44% | | Others / Undecided; 6% |
| Monmouth Margin of error: ± 5.7% Sample size: 300 | April 18–20, 2016 | Hillary Clinton; 57% | Bernie Sanders; 32% | | Others / Undecided; 11% |
| Public Policy Polling Margin of error: ± 4.4% Sample size: 492 | April 15–17, 2016 | Hillary Clinton; 58% | Bernie Sanders; 33% | | Others / Undecided; 9% |
| NBC 4/Marist Margin of error: ± 3.5% Sample size: 775 | April 5–9, 2016 | Hillary Clinton; 58% | Bernie Sanders; 36% | | Others / Undecided; 6% |
| University of Maryland/Washington Post Margin of error: ± 5.5% Sample size: 539 | March 30 - April 4, 2016 | Hillary Clinton; 55% | Bernie Sanders; 40% | | Others / Undecided; 5% |
| Baltimore Sun Margin of error: ± 4.9% Sample size: 400 | March 4–8, 2016 | Hillary Clinton; 61% | Bernie Sanders; 28% | | Others / Undecided; 11% |
| Gonzales/Arscott Research Margin of error: ± 5.0; Sample size: 411 | February 29-March 4, 2016 | Hillary Clinton; 57% | Bernie Sanders; 26% | | Others / Undecided; 17% |
| Goucher Margin of error: ± 3.5; Sample size: 794 | February 13–18, 2016 | Hillary Clinton; 58% | Bernie Sanders; 28% | | Others / Undecided; 14% |
| Baltimore Sun/University of Baltimore Margin of error: ± 5% Sample size: 402 | January 11–16, 2016 | Hillary Clinton; 40% | Bernie Sanders; 27% | | Others / Undecided; 33% |

Polls in 2015

| Poll source | Date | 1st | 2nd | 3rd | Other |
|---|---|---|---|---|---|
| Baltimore Sun/University of Baltimore Margin of error: ± 4.8% Sample size: 419 | November 13–17, 2015 | Hillary Clinton; 56% | Bernie Sanders; 23% | Martin O'Malley; 7% | Other/Unsure 14% |
| Washington Post Margin of error: ± 5% Sample size: 490 | October 8–11, 2015 | Hillary Clinton; 43% | Joe Biden; 26% | Bernie Sanders; 20% | Martin O'Malley 4%, Jim Webb 1%, Lincoln Chafee 0%, None/Any/Other 3%, No Opinion 2% |
| Goucher Margin of error: ± 5.7% Sample size: 300 | September 26 – October 1, 2015 | Hillary Clinton; 43% | Joe Biden; 23% | Bernie Sanders; 17% | Martin O'Malley 2%, Jim Webb 2%, Lincoln Chafee 0%, None/Any/Other 2%, Undecided 11% |

Polls in 2014

| Poll source | Date | 1st | 2nd | 3rd | Other |
|---|---|---|---|---|---|
| Washington Post Margin of error: ± 5% Sample size: 538 | February 13–16, 2014 | Hillary Clinton; 72% | Joe Biden; 9% | Martin O'Malley; 6% | Elizabeth Warren 3%, Andrew Cuomo 2%, None 1%, Undecided 7% |
| Baltimore Sun Margin of error: ± 4.4% Sample size: 500 | February 8–12, 2014 | Hillary Clinton; 59% | Joe Biden; 14% | Martin O'Malley; 6% | Andrew Cuomo 4%, Undecided/Other 17% |

Polls in 2013

| Poll source | Date | 1st | 2nd | 3rd | Other |
|---|---|---|---|---|---|
| Washington Post Margin of error: Sample size: | February 21–24, 2013 | Hillary Clinton; 56% | Joe Biden; 18% | Martin O'Malley; 8% | Andrew Cuomo 4%, None/other/any of them 4%, No opinion 9% |

=== Massachusetts ===
Delegate count: 91 Pledged, 25 Unpledged Winner: Hillary Clinton
Primary date: March 1, 2016

| Poll source | Date | 1st | 2nd | 3rd | Other |
|---|---|---|---|---|---|
| Primary results | March 1, 2016 | Hillary Clinton; 49.7% | Bernie Sanders; 48.3% | | Others / Uncommitted; 2.0% |
| SurveyMonkey Margin of error: ± ? Sample size: 1,224 | February 22–29, 2016 | Hillary Clinton; 48% | Bernie Sanders; 46% | | Others / Undecided; 6% |
| Emerson College Margin of error: ± 3.7% Sample size: 670 | February 26–28, 2016 | Hillary Clinton; 54% | Bernie Sanders; 43% | | Others / Undecided; 3% |
| Suffolk University Margin of error: ± 4.4% Sample size: 500 | February 25–27, 2016 | Hillary Clinton; 50% | Bernie Sanders; 42% | | Others / Undecided; 8% |
| WBZ-UMass Amherst Margin of error: ± 6.5% Sample size: 400 | February 19–25, 2016 | Hillary Clinton; 47% | Bernie Sanders; 44% | | Others / Undecided; 9% |
| WBUR Margin of error: ± 4.9% Sample size: 418 | February 21–23, 2016 | Hillary Clinton; 49% | Bernie Sanders; 44% | | Others / Undecided; 7% |
| Emerson College Margin of error: ± 4.75% Sample size: 417 | February 19–21, 2016 | Hillary Clinton; 46% | Bernie Sanders; 46% | | Undecided 5% |
| Public Policy Polling Margin of error: ± 4.2; Sample Size: 538 | February 14–16, 2016 | Bernie Sanders; 49% | Hillary Clinton; 42% | | Undecided 9% |
| Emerson College Margin of error: ± 6.0% Sample size: 265 | October 16–18, 2015 | Hillary Clinton; 59% | Bernie Sanders; 25% | Jim Webb; 5% | Martin O'Malley 3%, Lincoln Chafee 3%, Other 2%, Undecided 3% |
| Emerson College Margin of error: ± ? Sample size: 430 | March 14–19, 2015 | Hillary Clinton; 43% | Elizabeth Warren; 16% | Joe Biden; 10% | Bernie Sanders 6%, Martin O'Malley 2%, Other/Undecided 24% |
| Gravis Marketing Margin of error: ± 4% Sample size: 358 | January 19–21, 2015 | Hillary Clinton; 46% | Elizabeth Warren; 22% | | Undecided 32% |
| Suffolk University Margin of error: ± 4.9% Sample size: 400 | August 21–24, 2014 | Hillary Clinton; 55% | Elizabeth Warren; 17.25% | Joe Biden; 7.75% | Andrew Cuomo 4.75%, Martin O'Malley 1.5%, Undecided 12.25%, Refused 1.25%, Other 0.25% |
| Public Policy Polling Margin of error: ± 3.8% Sample size: 666 | May 1–2, 2013 | Hillary Clinton; 55% | Joe Biden; 17% | Andrew Cuomo; 4% | Deval Patrick 4%, Elizabeth Warren 4%, Martin O'Malley 1%, Kirsten Gillibrand 0%, Brian Schweitzer 0%, Mark Warner 0%, Someone else/Not sure 14% |

=== Michigan ===
Delegate count: 130 Pledged, 17 Unpledged Winner: Bernie Sanders
Primary date: March 8, 2016

| Poll source | Date | 1st | 2nd | 3rd | Other |
|---|---|---|---|---|---|
| Official Primary results | March 8, 2016 | Bernie Sanders; 49.7% | Hillary Clinton; 48.3% | | Others / Uncommitted; 2.1% |
| FOX 2 Detroit/Mitchell Margin of error: ± 4.5% Sample size: 482 | March 7, 2016 | Hillary Clinton; 61% | Bernie Sanders; 34% | | Others / Undecided; 5% |
| FOX 2 Detroit/Mitchell Margin of error: ± 4.5% Sample size: 475 | March 6, 2016 | Hillary Clinton; 66% | Bernie Sanders; 29% | | Others / Undecided; 5% |
| Monmouth Margin of error: ± 5.6% Sample size: 302 | March 3–6, 2016 | Hillary Clinton; 55% | Bernie Sanders; 42% | | Others / Undecided; 4% |
| ARG Margin of error: ± 5.0% Sample size: 400 | March 4–5, 2016 | Hillary Clinton; 60% | Bernie Sanders; 36% | | Others / Undecided; 4% |
| CBS News/YouGov Margin of error: ± 7.7% Sample size: 597 | March 2–4, 2016 | Hillary Clinton; 55% | Bernie Sanders; 44% | | Others / Undecided; 1% |
| Mitchell/FOX 2 Margin of error: ± 4.0% Sample size: 610 | March 2–3, 2016 | Hillary Clinton; 55% | Bernie Sanders; 37% | | Others / Undecided; 8% |
| NBC News/Wall St. Jrnl Margin of error: ± 4.2% Sample size: 546 | March 1–3, 2016 | Hillary Clinton; 57% | Bernie Sanders; 40% | | Others / Undecided; 3% |
| MSU Margin of error: ± 6.1% Sample size: 262 | January 25-March 3, 2016 | Hillary Clinton; 52% | Bernie Sanders; 47% | | Others / Undecided; 1% |
| FOX 2 Detroit/Mitchell Margin of error: ± 4.7% Sample size: 427 | March 1, 2016 | Hillary Clinton; 61% | Bernie Sanders; 33% | | Others / Undecided; 6% |
| MRG Margin of error: ± 4.0% Sample size: 218 | February 22–27, 2016 | Hillary Clinton; 56% | Bernie Sanders; 36% | | Others / Undecided; 8% |
| FOX 2 Detroit/Mitchell Margin of error: ± 5.3% Sample size: 344 | February 23, 2016 | Hillary Clinton; 65% | Bernie Sanders; 31% | | Others / Undecided; 4% |
| ARG Margin of error: ± 5% Sample size: 400 | February 19–20, 2016 | Hillary Clinton; 53% | Bernie Sanders; 40% | | Others / Undecided; 7% |
| Fox 2 Detroit/Mitchell Margin of error: ± 4.69% Sample size: 430 | February 15, 2016 | Hillary Clinton; 60% | Bernie Sanders; 27% | | Others / Undecided 13% |
| Public Policy Polling Margin of error: ± 4.4; Sample size: 500 | February 14–16, 2016 | Hillary Clinton; 50% | Bernie Sanders; 40% | | |
| Fox 2 Detroit/Mitchell Margin of error: ± 5.5% Sample size: 321 | February 4, 2016 | Hillary Clinton; 57% | Bernie Sanders; 28% | | Others / Undecided 15% |
| IMP/Target Insyght Margin of error: ± 5.0% Sample size: 400 | February 2–4, 2016 | Hillary Clinton; 62% | Bernie Sanders; 30% | | Others / Undecided 8% |
| Marketing Resource Group Margin of error: ± 4% Sample size: 600 | September 9–14, 2015 | Hillary Clinton; 41% | Bernie Sanders; 22% | Joe Biden 22% | Martin O'Malley 1%, Undecided 12% |
| Public Policy Polling Margin of error: ± 4.7% Sample size: 431 | June 25–28, 2015 | Hillary Clinton; 57% | Bernie Sanders; 25% | Lincoln Chafee 5% | Jim Webb 2%, Martin O'Malley 1%, Not sure 10% |
| Suffolk Margin of error: ± ? Sample size: 212 | September 6–10, 2014 | Hillary Clinton; 61% | Joe Biden; 17% | Elizabeth Warren; 7% | Andrew Cuomo 4%, Martin O'Malley 1%, Undecided 9%, Refused 1% |

=== Minnesota ===
Delegate count: 77 Pledged, 16 Unpledged Winner: Bernie Sanders
Caucus date: March 1, 2016

| Poll source | Date | 1st | 2nd | 3rd | Other |
|---|---|---|---|---|---|
| Caucus results | March 1, 2016 | Bernie Sanders; 61.6% | Hillary Clinton; 38.4% | | |
| Star Tribune/Mason-Dixon Margin of error: ± 5.7% Sample size: 800 | January 18–20, 2016 | Hillary Clinton; 59% | Bernie Sanders; 25% | Martin O'Malley; 1% | Undecided 15% |
| Public Policy Polling Margin of error: ± 4.9% Sample size: 426 | July 30 – August 2, 2015 | Hillary Clinton; 50% | Bernie Sanders; 32% | Martin O'Malley; 4% | Lincoln Chafee 3%, Jim Webb 2%, Not sure 10% |
| Suffolk University Margin of error: ± ? Sample size: 100 | April 24–28, 2014 | Hillary Clinton; 63% | Elizabeth Warren; 15% | Joe Biden; 4% | Cory Booker 3%, Deval Patrick 2%, Mark Warner 2%, Andrew Cuomo 1%, Undecided 10% |
| Public Policy Polling Margin of error: ± 5.1% Sample size: 373 | January 18–20, 2013 | Hillary Clinton; 59% | Joe Biden; 14% | Amy Klobuchar; 11% | Elizabeth Warren 4%, Andrew Cuomo 3%, Martin O'Malley 1%, Deval Patrick 0%, Brian Schweitzer 1%, Mark Warner 0%, Someone Else/Undecided 10% |
| Public Policy Polling Margin of error: ± 5.1% Sample size: 373 | January 18–20, 2013 | Amy Klobuchar; 43% | Andrew Cuomo; 14% | Elizabeth Warren; 10% | Martin O'Malley 1%, Deval Patrick 1%, Brian Schweitzer 0%, Mark Warner 0%, Someone Else/Undecided 30% |

=== Mississippi ===
Delegate count: 36 Pledged, 5 Unpledged Winner: Hillary Clinton
Primary date: March 8, 2016

| Poll source | Date | 1st | 2nd | Other |
|---|---|---|---|---|
| Official Primary results | March 8, 2016 | Hillary Clinton; 82.5% | Bernie Sanders; 16.6% | Others / Uncommitted; 0.9% |
| Magellan Strategies Margin of error: ±4.5% Sample size: 471 | February 29, 2016 | Hillary Clinton; 65% | Bernie Sanders; 11% | Others / Undecided; 24% |
| Public Policy Polling Margin of error: ± 4.3; Sample size: 514 | February 14–16, 2016 | Hillary Clinton; 60% | Bernie Sanders; 26% | |

=== Missouri ===
Delegate count: 71 Pledged, 13 Unpledged Winner: Hillary Clinton
Primary date: March 15, 2016

| Poll source | Date | 1st | 2nd | 3rd | Other |
|---|---|---|---|---|---|
| Official Primary results | March 15, 2016 | Hillary Clinton; 49.6% | Bernie Sanders; 49.4% | | Others / Uncommitted; 1.0% |
| Public Policy Polling Margin of error: ± 3.4% Sample size: 839 | March 11–12, 2016 | Bernie Sanders; 47% | Hillary Clinton; 46% | | Others / Undecided; 7% |
| RABA Research Margin of error: ± 4% Sample size: 670 | March 8–10, 2016 | Hillary Clinton; 44% | Bernie Sanders; 40% | | Others / Undecided; 16% |
| Fort Hayes State University Margin of error: ± 8% Sample size: 145 | March 3–10, 2016 | Hillary Clinton; 47% | Bernie Sanders; 40% | | Others / Undecided 13% |
| Public Policy Polling Margin of error: 5.2% Sample size: 352 | August 7–9, 2015 | Hillary Clinton; 53% | Bernie Sanders; 25% | Martin O'Malley; 5% | Jim Webb 5%, Lincoln Chafee 1%, Not sure 12% |

=== Montana ===
Delegate count: 21 Pledged, 6 Unpledged Winner: Bernie Sanders
Primary date: June 7, 2016

| Poll source | Date | 1st | 2nd | 3rd | Other |
|---|---|---|---|---|---|
| Official Primary results | June 7, 2016 | Bernie Sanders; 51.6% | Hillary Clinton; 44.2% | | No Preference; 4.3% |
| Gravis Marketing Margin of error: 3% Sample size: 1,035 | February 24–25, 2015 | Hillary Clinton; 42.2% | Elizabeth Warren; 34.3% | Joe Biden; 5.9% | Jim Webb 2.9%, Mark Warner 2%, Martin O'Malley 1%, Unsure 11.8% |
| Public Policy Polling Margin of error: ± 5% Sample size: 381 | November 15–17, 2013 | Hillary Clinton; 47% | Brian Schweitzer; 26% | Elizabeth Warren; 8% | Joe Biden 6%, Andrew Cuomo 3%, Cory Booker 1%, Martin O'Malley 1%, Kirsten Gillibrand 0%, Mark Warner 0%, Someone Else/Undecided 7% |
| Public Policy Polling Margin of error: ± 5.6% Sample size: 316 | June 21–23, 2013 | Hillary Clinton; 52% | Brian Schweitzer; 17% | Joe Biden; 9% | Cory Booker 3%, Elizabeth Warren 3%, Andrew Cuomo 1%, Kirsten Gillibrand 1%, Martin O'Malley 0%, Mark Warner 0%, Someone Else/Undecided 13% |
| Public Policy Polling Margin of error: ± 5.1% Sample size: 371 | February 15–17, 2013 | Hillary Clinton; 58% | Brian Schweitzer; 22% | Joe Biden; 9% | Elizabeth Warren 5%, Andrew Cuomo 3%, Martin O'Malley 1%, Deval Patrick 1%, Kirsten Gillibrand 0%, Mark Warner 0%, Someone Else/Undecided 5% |
| Public Policy Polling Margin of error: ± 5.1% Sample size: 371 | February 15–17, 2013 | Brian Schweitzer; 35% | Joe Biden; 28% | Elizabeth Warren; 13% | Mark Warner 5%, Andrew Cuomo 4%, Kirsten Gillibrand 1%, Martin O'Malley 1%, Deval Patrick 0%, Someone Else/Undecided 13% |
| Public Policy Polling Margin of error: ± 5.1% Sample size: 371 | February 15–17, 2013 | Brian Schweitzer; 46% | Elizabeth Warren; 18% | Andrew Cuomo; 12% | Mark Warner 3%, Martin O'Malley 2%, Kirsten Gillibrand 1%, Deval Patrick 1%, Someone Else/Undecided 18% |

=== Nebraska ===
Delegate count: 25 Pledged, 5 Unpledged Winner: Bernie Sanders
Primary date: March 5, 2016

| Poll source | Date | 1st | 2nd | 3rd |
|---|---|---|---|---|
| Caucus results | March 5, 2016 | Bernie Sanders; 57.1% | Hillary Clinton; 42.9% | |

No polls were conducted for the Nebraska Democratic caucuses

=== Nevada ===
Delegate count: 35 Pledged, 8 Unpledged Winner: Hillary Clinton
Caucus date: February 20, 2016

| Poll source | Date | 1st | 2nd | Other |
|---|---|---|---|---|
| Caucus results | February 20, 2016 | Hillary Clinton; 52.6% | Bernie Sanders; 47.3% | Other; 0.1% |
| Gravis Marketing Margin of error: ± 4.0; Sample size: 516 | February 14–15, 2016 | Hillary Clinton; 53% | Bernie Sanders; 47% | |
| CNN/ORC Margin of error: ± 6.0; Sample size: 282 | February 10–15, 2016 | Hillary Clinton; 48% | Bernie Sanders; 47% | Others / Undecided; 6% |
| Washington Free Beacon/TPC Research Margin of error: ± 2.9; Sample size: 1,236 | February 8–10, 2016 | Hillary Clinton; 45% | Bernie Sanders; 45% | Undecided 9% |

Polls in 2015

| Poll source | Date | 1st | 2nd | 3rd | Other |
|---|---|---|---|---|---|
| Gravis Marketing Margin of error: ± 5% Sample size: 326 | December 23–27, 2015 | Hillary Clinton; 50% | Bernie Sanders; 27% | Martin O'Malley; 1% | Unsure 16% |
| CNN/ORC Margin of error: ± 6% Sample size: 253 | October 3–10, 2015 | Hillary Clinton; 50% | Bernie Sanders; 34% | Joe Biden; 12% | |
| Gravis Marketing Margin of error: ± 5% Sample size: 416 | July 12–13, 2015 | Hillary Clinton; 55% | Bernie Sanders; 18% | Elizabeth Warren; 8% | Joe Biden 5%, Lincoln Chafee 1%, Jim Webb 1%, Martin O'Malley 0%, Unsure 12% |
| Gravis Marketing Margin of error: ± 6% Sample size: 324 | March 27, 2015 | Hillary Clinton; 61% | Elizabeth Warren; 15% | Bernie Sanders; 7% | Joe Biden 3%, Al Gore 3%, Martin O'Malley 1%, Jim Webb 0%, Unsure 10% |
| Gravis Marketing Margin of error: ± 6% Sample size: 324 | February 21–22, 2015 | Hillary Clinton; 58% | Elizabeth Warren; 20% | Joe Biden; 8% | Bernie Sanders 4%, Jim Webb 3%, Martin O'Malley 0%, Undecided 7% |

=== New Hampshire ===
Delegate count: 24 Pledged, 8 Unpledged Winner: Bernie Sanders
Primary date: February 9, 2016

| Poll source | Date | 1st | 2nd | 3rd | Other |
|---|---|---|---|---|---|
| Official Primary results | February 9, 2016 | Bernie Sanders; 60.1% | Hillary Clinton; 37.7% | | Others / Uncommitted; 2.2% |
| American Research Group; Margin of error: ± 5% Sample size: 408 | February 6–7, 2016 | Bernie Sanders; 53% | Hillary Clinton; 41% | | Undecided; 6% |
| University of Massachusetts-Lowell/7 News survey Margin of error: ± 5.38% Sample size: 428 | February 4–6, 2016 | Bernie Sanders; 57% | Hillary Clinton; 40% | | Others / Undecided; 3% |
| University of Massachusetts-Lowell/7 News survey Margin of error: ± 5.3% Sample size: 442 | January 29–31, 2016 | Bernie Sanders; 61% | Hillary Clinton; 30% | Martin O'Malley; 1% | Undecided 6% |
| CNN/WMUR; Margin of error: ± 5.3% Sample size: 347 | January 27–30, 2016 | Bernie Sanders; 57% | Hillary Clinton; 34% | Martin O'Malley; 1% | Other, Undecided, or Not Committed 9% |
| Emerson College Margin of error ± 5.2% Sample Size: 350 | January 25–26, 2016 | Bernie Sanders; 52% | Hillary Clinton; 44% | Martin O'Malley; 3% | Other 1% |
| American Research Group Margin of error ± 4% Sample Size: 396 | January 23–25, 2016 | Bernie Sanders; 49% | Hillary Clinton; 42% | Martin O'Malley; 3% | Other 6% |
| Franklin Pierce University/Boston Herald Margin of error ± 4.9% Sample Size: 408 | January 20–24, 2016 | Bernie Sanders; 55% | Hillary Clinton; 39% | Martin O'Malley; 2% | Other 5% |
| Fox News Margin of error ± 4.5% Sample Size: 400 | January 18–21, 2016 | Bernie Sanders; 56% | Hillary Clinton; 34% | Martin O'Malley; 3% | Other 7% |
| CBS News/YouGov Margin of error ± 6.2% Sample Size: | January 18–21, 2016 | Bernie Sanders; 57% | Hillary Clinton; 38% | Martin O'Malley; 5% | No preference 0% |
| Suffolk University Margin of error – Sample Size: 500 | January 17–21, 2016 | Bernie Sanders; 50% | Hillary Clinton; 41% | Martin O'Malley; 2% | Other/Undecided 7% |
| American Research Group Margin of error ± 4% Sample Size: 600 | January 15–18, 2016 | Bernie Sanders; 49% | Hillary Clinton; 43% | Martin O'Malley; 3% | Undecided 5% |
| Gravis Marketing Margin of error ± 4.5% Sample Size: 472 | January 15–18, 2016 | Bernie Sanders; 46% | Hillary Clinton; 43% | Martin O'Malley; 2% | Undecided 8% |
| CNN and WMUR Margin of error ± 4.8% Sample Size: 420 | January 13–18, 2016 | Bernie Sanders; 60% | Hillary Clinton; 33% | Martin O'Malley; 1% | Undecided 6% |
| Monmouth University Poll Margin of error ± 4.8% Sample Size: 413 | January 7–10, 2016 | Bernie Sanders; 53% | Hillary Clinton; 39% | Martin O'Malley; 5% | Undecided 3% |
| Fox News Margin of error ± 5% Sample Size: 386 | January 4–7, 2016 | Bernie Sanders; 50% | Hillary Clinton; 37% | Martin O'Malley; 3% | Other 2%, None of the above 5%, Don't know 3% |
| NBC News/WSJ/Marist Margin of error: ± 4.8% Sample size: 425 | January 2–7, 2016 | Bernie Sanders; 50% | Hillary Clinton; 46% | Martin O'Malley; 1% | |

Polls in 2015

| Poll source | Date | 1st | 2nd | 3rd | Other |
|---|---|---|---|---|---|
| American Research Group Margin of error ± 4% Sample Size: 600 | December 20–22, 2015 | Hillary Clinton; 46% | Bernie Sanders; 43% | Martin O'Malley; 3% | Other <0.5%, Undecided 7% |
| YouGov/CBS News Margin of error ± 5.7% Sample Size: 1091 | December 14–17, 2015 | Bernie Sanders; 56% | Hillary Clinton; 42% | Martin O'Malley; 1% | No preference 1% |
| Boston Herald Margin of error ± 4.8% Sample Size: 410 | December 13–17, 2015 | Bernie Sanders; 48% | Hillary Clinton; 46% | Martin O'Malley; 2% | Undecided 4% |
| CNN and WMUR Margin of error: ± 5.1% Sample size: 370 | November 30 – December 7, 2015 | Bernie Sanders; 50% | Hillary Clinton; 40% | Martin O'Malley; 1% | Someone Else/Not Sure 6% |
| Public Policy Polling Margin of error: ± 4.6% Sample size: 458 | November 30 – December 2, 2015 | Hillary Clinton; 44% | Bernie Sanders; 42% | Martin O'Malley; 8% | Someone Else/Not Sure 7% |
| YouGov/CBS News Margin of error: ± 5.2% Sample size: 561 | November 15–19, 2015 | Bernie Sanders; 52% | Hillary Clinton; 45% | Martin O'Malley 3% | Undecided 0% |
| Fox News Margin of error: ± 3.5% Sample size: 804 | November 15–17, 2015 | Bernie Sanders; 45% | Hillary Clinton; 44% | Martin O'Malley 5% | None 1%, Don't Know 5% |
| Gravis Marketing Margin of error: ± 6.7% Sample size: 214 | November 11, 2015 | Hillary Clinton; 46% | Bernie Sanders; 25% | Martin O'Malley; 3% | Unsure 26% |
| Monmouth University Polling Institute Margin of error: ± 4.9% Sample size: 403 | October 29 – November 1, 2015 | Hillary Clinton; 48% | Bernie Sanders; 45% | Martin O'Malley; 3% | Lawrence Lessig 1% |
| YouGov/CBS News Margin of error: ± 7.1% Sample size: 499 | October 15–22, 2015 | Bernie Sanders; 54% | Hillary Clinton; 39% | Martin O'Malley 3% | Lincoln Chafee 0%, Lawrence Lessig 0%, No preference 3% |
| Public Policy Polling Margin of error: ± 4.9% Sample size: 393 | October 16–18, 2015 | Hillary Clinton; 41% | Bernie Sanders; 33% | Joe Biden; 11% | Martin O'Malley 4%, Lincoln Chafee 2%, Jim Webb 2%, Lawrence Lessig 0%, Not Sure 7% |
| Bloomberg/San Anselm Poll Margin of error: ± 4.9% Sample size: 400 | October 15–18, 2015 | Bernie Sanders; 41% | Hillary Clinton; 36% | Joe Biden; 10% | Jim Webb 1%, Lawrence Lessig 1%, Someone Else 1%, None of the Above 2%, Not Sure 8% |
| Franklin Pierce-Herald Margin of error: ± 4.9% Sample size: 403 | October 14–17, 2015 | Bernie Sanders; 38% | Hillary Clinton; 30% | Joe Biden; 19% | Jim Webb 1%, Martin O'Malley 1%, Lincoln Chafee 1% |
| Boston Globe/Suffolk University Margin of error: ± 4.4% Sample size: 500 | October 14–15, 2015 | Hillary Clinton; 36.8% | Bernie Sanders; 35.4% | Joe Biden; 11.2% | Jim Webb 2.6%, Martin O'Malley 1.4%, Lincoln Chafee 0.6%, Lawrence Lessig 0.2%, Undecided 11.6% |
| Gravis Marketing Margin of error: ± 5.1% Sample size: 373 | October 5–6, 2015 | Bernie Sanders; 32.8% | Hillary Clinton; 30.2% | Joe Biden; 10.6% | Martin O'Malley 1.5%, Jim Webb 0.7%, Lincoln Chafee 0.8%, Undecided 23.3% |
| NBC News/WSJ/Marist Margin of error: ± 4.9% Sample size: 404 | September 23–30, 2015 | Bernie Sanders; 42% | Hillary Clinton; 28% | Joe Biden; 18% | Martin O'Malley 2%, Jim Webb 1%, Lincoln Chafee 1%, Undecided 9% |
| NBC News/WSJ/Marist Margin of error: ± 4.9% Sample size: 404 | September 23–30, 2015 | Bernie Sanders; 48% | Hillary Clinton; 39% | Lincoln Chafee 2% | Martin O'Malley 2%, Jim Webb 1%, Undecided 9% |
| UNH/WMUR Margin of error: ± 5.5% Sample size: 314 | September 17–23, 2015 | Bernie Sanders; 46% | Hillary Clinton; 30% | Joe Biden; 14% | Martin O'Malley 2%, Jim Webb 1%, Lincoln Chafee 0%, Someone else 1%, Don't Know Yet 6% |
| MassINC/WBUR/NPR Margin of error: ± 4.9% Sample size: 404 | September 12–15, 2015 | Bernie Sanders; 35% | Hillary Clinton; 31% | Joe Biden; 14% | Jim Webb 2%, Martin O'Malley 1%, Lincoln Chafee 1%, Did not know/refused 10%, Some other candidate 4%, Would not vote 2% |
| Monmouth University Margin of error: ± 4.9% Sample size: 400 | September 10–13, 2015 | Bernie Sanders; 43% | Hillary Clinton; 36% | Joe Biden; 13% | Martin O'Malley 2%, Lincoln Chafee 1%, Jim Webb 1%, Lawrence Lessig 1%, other 1%, undecided 3% |
| YouGov/CBS News Margin of error: ± 7.4% Sample size: 548 | September 3–10, 2015 | Bernie Sanders; 52% | Hillary Clinton; 30% | Joe Biden; 9% | Martin O'Malley 1%, Lincoln Chafee 0%, Jim Webb 0%, No preference 8% |
| NBC News/Marist Poll Margin of error: ± 5.2% Sample size: 356 | Published September 6, 2015 | Bernie Sanders; 41% | Hillary Clinton; 32% | Joe Biden; 16% | Jim Webb 1%, Martin O'Malley 1%, Lincoln Chafee <1%, Undecided 8% |
| NBC News/Marist Poll Margin of error: ± 5.2% Sample size: 356 | Published September 6, 2015 | Bernie Sanders; 49% | Hillary Clinton; 38% | Jim Webb; 2% | Lincoln Chafee 1%, Martin O'Malley 1%, Undecided 8% |
| Public Policy Polling Margin of error: ± 5.1% Sample size: 370 | August 21–24, 2015 | Bernie Sanders; 42% | Hillary Clinton; 35% | Jim Webb; 6% | Martin O'Malley 4%, Lincoln Chafee 2%, Lawrence Lessig 1%, Not sure 10% |
| Franklin Pierce University/Boston Herald Margin of error: ± 4.7% Sample size: 442 | August 7–10, 2015 | Bernie Sanders; 44% | Hillary Clinton; 37% | Joe Biden; 9% | Jim Webb 1%, Martin O'Malley <1%, Lincoln Chafee <1%, Other/Not sure 9% |
| Gravis Marketing/One; America News Margin of error: ± 4.5% Sample size: 475 | July 31 – August 3, 2015 | Hillary Clinton; 43% | Bernie Sanders; 39% | Elizabeth Warren; 8% | Joe Biden 6%, Martin O'Malley 2%, Jim Webb 2%, Lincoln Chafee 0% |
| UNH/WMUR Margin of error: ± 5.9% Sample size: 276 | July 22–30, 2015 | Hillary Clinton; 42% | Bernie Sanders; 36% | Joe Biden; 5% | Martin O'Malley 1%, Jim Webb 1%, Lincoln Chafee 0%, Someone else 3%, Don't Know Yet 12% |
| NBC News/Marist Margin of error: ± 5.4% Sample size: 329 | July 14–21, 2015 | Hillary Clinton; 42% | Bernie Sanders; 32% | Joe Biden; 12% | Martin O'Malley 3%, Lincoln Chafee 2%, Jim Webb 1%, Undecided 10% |
| CNN/WMUR Margin of error: ± 5.2% Sample size: 360 | June 18–24, 2015 | Hillary Clinton; 43% | Bernie Sanders; 35% | Joe Biden; 8% | Martin O'Malley 2%, Jim Webb 1%, Lincoln Chafee 0%, Someone else 2%, Not sure 9% |
| Bloomberg/Saint Anselm Margin of error: ± 4.9% Sample size: 400 | June 19–22, 2015 | Hillary Clinton; 56% | Bernie Sanders; 24% | Martin O'Malley; 2% | Lincoln Chafee 1%, None of the above 4%, Not sure 12% |
| Suffolk Margin of error: ± 4.4% Sample size: 500 | June 11–15, 2015 | Hillary Clinton; 41% | Bernie Sanders; 31% | Joe Biden; 7% | Martin O'Malley 3%, Lincoln Chafee 1%, Jim Webb 1%, Other 0%, Undecided 15% |
| Morning Consult Margin of error: ± 6% Sample size: 279 | May 31 – June 8, 2015 | Hillary Clinton; 44% | Bernie Sanders; 32% | Joe Biden; 8% | Martin O'Malley 2%, Jim Webb 1%, Lincoln Chafee 0%, Someone else 0%, Don't know/no opinion 11% |
| Purple Strategies Margin of error: ± 4.9% Sample size: 400 | May 2–6, 2015 | Hillary Clinton; 62% | Bernie Sanders; 18% | Joe Biden; 5% | Martin O'Malley 3%, Lincoln Chafee 1%, Jim Webb 1%, Someone else 0%, None of the above 3%, Not sure 8% |
| UNH/WMUR Margin of error: ± 6.5% Sample size: 229 | April 24 – May 3, 2015 | Hillary Clinton; 51% | Elizabeth Warren; 20% | Bernie Sanders; 13% | Andrew Cuomo 3%, Joe Biden 2%, Lincoln Chafee 1%, Martin O'Malley 1%, Jim Webb 1%, Undecided 8% |
| Gravis Marketing Margin of error: ± 5% Sample size: 369 | April 21–22, 2015 | Hillary Clinton; 45% | Elizabeth Warren; 24% | Bernie Sanders; 12% | Joe Biden 7%, Martin O'Malley 4%, Lincoln Chafee 2%, Jim Webb 2%, Bill de Blasio 0.4%, Undecided 5% |
| Gravis Marketing Margin of error: ± 5% Sample size: 369 | April 21–22, 2015 | Hillary Clinton; 54% | Bernie Sanders; 19% | Joe Biden; 10% | Martin O'Malley 5%, Jim Webb 4%, Lincoln Chafee 2%, Bill de Blasio 1%, Undecided 6% |
| Public Policy Polling Margin of error: ± 5.4% Sample size: 329 | April 9–13, 2015 | Hillary Clinton; 45% | Elizabeth Warren; 23% | Bernie Sanders; 12% | Joe Biden 7%, Martin O'Malley 3%, Lincoln Chafee 1%, Jim Webb 1%, Other/Undecided 9% |
| Franklin Pierce University/Boston Herald Margin of error: ± 4.7% Sample size: 417 | March 22–25, 2015 | Hillary Clinton; 47% | Elizabeth Warren; 22% | Joe Biden; 10% | Bernie Sanders 8%, Andrew Cuomo 4%, Martin O'Malley 1%, Jim Webb <1%, Other 3%, Unsure 5% |
| Franklin Pierce University/Boston Herald Margin of error: ± 4.7% Sample size: 417 | March 22–25, 2015 | Hillary Clinton; 41% | Elizabeth Warren; 20% | Al Gore; 16% | Joe Biden 7%, Bernie Sanders 6%, Andrew Cuomo 1%, Martin O'Malley <1%, Jim Webb <1%, Other 2%, Unsure 6% |
| Gravis Marketing Margin of error: ± 5% Sample size: 427 | March 18–19, 2015 | Hillary Clinton; 49% | Elizabeth Warren; 20% | Bernie Sanders; 12% | Joe Biden 5%, Martin O'Malley 2%, Jim Webb 2%, Unsure 10% |
| NBC News/Marist Margin of error: ± 5.6% Sample size: 309 | February 3–10, 2015 | Hillary Clinton; 69% | Bernie Sanders; 13% | Joe Biden; 8% | Jim Webb 2%, Martin O'Malley <1%, Undecided 7% |
| Purple Strategies Margin of error: ± 4.9% Sample size: 400 | January 31 – February 5, 2015 | Hillary Clinton; 56% | Elizabeth Warren; 15% | Joe Biden; 8% | Bernie Sanders 8%, Martin O'Malley 0%, Jim Webb 0%, Someone else 0%, None of the above 2%, Not sure 11% |
| Gravis Marketing Margin of error: ± 5% Sample size: 384 | February 2–3, 2015 | Hillary Clinton; 44% | Elizabeth Warren; 25% | Bernie Sanders; 13% | Joe Biden 5%, Martin O'Malley 1%, Jim Webb 1%, Unsure 10% |
| UNH/WMUR Margin of error: ± 5.7% Sample size: 297 | January 22 – February 3, 2015 | Hillary Clinton; 58% | Elizabeth Warren; 14% | Joe Biden; 8% | Bernie Sanders 6%, Andrew Cuomo 2%, Martin O'Malley 1%, Jim Webb 1%, Someone else 1%, Don't know yet 9% |

Polls in 2014

| Poll source | Date | 1st | 2nd | 3rd | Other |
|---|---|---|---|---|---|
| Purple Insights Margin of error: ± 4.9% Sample size: 404 | November 12–18, 2014 | Hillary Clinton; 62% | Elizabeth Warren; 13% | Bernie Sanders; 6% | Joe Biden 5%, Deval Patrick 2%, Martin O'Malley 1%, Someone else 0%, None of the above 2%, Not sure 8% |
| New England College Margin of error: ± 4.06% Sample size: 583 | October 31 – November 1, 2014 | Hillary Clinton; 53.1% | Elizabeth Warren; 16.8% | Bernie Sanders; 7% | Joe Biden 5.8%, Martin O'Malley 2.3%, Deval Patrick 1.4%, Andrew Cuomo 1.2%, Kirsten Gillibrand 1.2%, Mark Warner 1.2%, Other 10% |
| UMass Amherst Margin of error: ± ? Sample size: 204 | October 10–15, 2014 | Hillary Clinton; 49% | Elizabeth Warren; 16% | Bernie Sanders; 11% | Joe Biden 6%, Andrew Cuomo 3%, Deval Patrick 3%, Martin O'Malley <1%, Cory Booker <1%, Other 11% |
| WMUR/UNH Margin of error: ± 5.9% Sample size: 275 | September 29 – October 5, 2014 | Hillary Clinton; 58% | Elizabeth Warren; 18% | Joe Biden; 3% | Martin O'Malley 3%, Bernie Sanders 3%, Andrew Cuomo 1%, Mark Warner <1%, Other 1%, Undecided 13% |
| CNN/ORC Margin of error: ± 5.5% Sample size: 334 | September 8–11, 2014 | Hillary Clinton; 60% | Elizabeth Warren; 11% | Joe Biden; 8% | Bernie Sanders 7%, Deval Patrick 4%, Andrew Cuomo 1%, Martin O'Malley 1%, Other 1%, None/No one 2%, No opinion 6% |
| NBC News/Marist Margin of error: ± 4.5% Sample size: 479 | July 7–13, 2014 | Hillary Clinton; 74% | Joe Biden; 18% | Undecided 8% | |
| WMUR/UNH Margin of error: ± 6.1% Sample size: 257 | June 19 – July 1, 2014 | Hillary Clinton; 59% | Joe Biden; 14% | Elizabeth Warren; 8% | Bernie Sanders 5%, Andrew Cuomo 3%, Mark Warner 1%, Martin O'Malley 0%, Brian Schweitzer 0%, Other 1%, Undecided 9% |
| WMUR/UNH Margin of error: ± 7.2% Sample size: 184 | April 1–9, 2014 | Hillary Clinton; 65% | Joe Biden; 6% | Andrew Cuomo; 4% | Mark Warner 2%, Martin O'Malley 0%, Brian Schweitzer 0%, Other 5%, Undecided 18% |
| WMUR/UNH Margin of error: ± 6.2% Sample size: 252 | January 21–26, 2014 | Hillary Clinton; 74% | Joe Biden; 10% | Andrew Cuomo; 2% | Mark Warner 1%, Martin O'Malley <1%, Brian Schweitzer <1%, Kirsten Gillibrand 0%, Other 2%, Undecided 10% |
| Purple Strategies Margin of error: ± 5.4% Sample size: 334 | January 21–23, 2014 | Hillary Clinton; 68% | Elizabeth Warren; 13% | Joe Biden; 6% | Deval Patrick 2%, Martin O'Malley 1%, Other 2%, None 1%, Undecided 5% |
| Public Policy Polling Margin of error: ± 4.4% Sample size: 502 | January 9–12, 2014 | Hillary Clinton; 65% | Joe Biden; 10% | Elizabeth Warren; 8% | Andrew Cuomo 3%, Cory Booker 2%, Kirsten Gillibrand 1%, Martin O'Malley 1%, Brian Schweitzer 0%, Mark Warner 0%, Someone else/Not sure 9% |
| Public Policy Polling Margin of error: ± 4.4% Sample size: 502 | January 9–12, 2014 | Joe Biden; 32% | Elizabeth Warren; 21% | Andrew Cuomo; 9% | Cory Booker 4%, Kirsten Gillibrand 4%, Martin O'Malley 2%, Brian Schweitzer 1%, Mark Warner 1%, Someone else/Not sure 26% |
| Public Policy Polling Margin of error: ± 4.4% Sample size: 502 | January 9–12, 2014 | Elizabeth Warren; 30% | Andrew Cuomo; 19% | Cory Booker; 9% | Martin O'Malley 5%, Kirsten Gillibrand 4%, Brian Schweitzer 2%, Mark Warner 2%, Someone else/Not sure 28% |

Polls in 2013

| Poll source | Date | 1st | 2nd | 3rd | Other |
|---|---|---|---|---|---|
| WMUR/UNH Margin of error: ± 6.2% Sample size: 252 | October 7–16, 2013 | Hillary Clinton; 64% | Joe Biden; 6% | Elizabeth Warren; 6% | Andrew Cuomo 2%, Deval Patrick 1%, Evan Bayh <1%, Cory Booker <1%, Martin O'Malley <1%, Mark Warner <1%, Kirsten Gillibrand 0%, John Hickenlooper 0%, Other 2%, Unsure 18% |
| Public Policy Polling Margin of error: ± 4.6% Sample size: 455 | September 13–16, 2013 | Hillary Clinton; 57% | Joe Biden; 12% | Elizabeth Warren; 11% | Cory Booker 4%, Andrew Cuomo 2%, Kirsten Gillibrand 1%, Mark Warner 1%, Martin O'Malley 0%, Brian Schweitzer 0%, Someone else/Not sure 11% |
| Public Policy Polling Margin of error: ± 4.6% Sample size: 455 | September 13–16, 2013 | Joe Biden; 36% | Elizabeth Warren; 20% | Cory Booker; 9% | Andrew Cuomo 7%, Kirsten Gillibrand 1%, Martin O'Malley 1%, Brian Schweitzer 1%, Mark Warner 1%, Someone else/Not sure 23% |
| Public Policy Polling Margin of error: ± 4.6% Sample size: 455 | September 13–16, 2013 | Elizabeth Warren; 33% | Andrew Cuomo; 14% | Cory Booker; 12% | Kirsten Gillibrand 5%, Martin O'Malley 4%, Mark Warner 2%, Brian Schweitzer 1%, Someone else/Not sure 30% |
| WMUR/UNH Margin of error: ± 7.1% Sample size: 190 | July 18–29, 2013 | Hillary Clinton; 62% | Joe Biden; 8% | Deval Patrick; 5% | Cory Booker 2%, Andrew Cuomo 1%, Evan Bayh <1%, Kirsten Gillibrand <1%, John Hickenlooper <1%, Martin O'Malley 0%, Mark Warner 0%, Other 2%, Unsure 19% |
| New England College Margin of error: ± 5.37% Sample size: 333 | July, 2013 | Hillary Clinton; 65% | Joe Biden; 8% | Jeanne Shaheen; 6% | Andrew Cuomo 1.5%, Martin O'Malley 0.6%, Unsure 19% |
| New England College Margin of error: ± 5.5% Sample size: 314 | May, 2013 | Hillary Clinton; 65% | Joe Biden; 10% | Elizabeth Warren; 5% | Andrew Cuomo 4%, Deval Patrick 3%, Martin O'Malley 0%, Unsure 13% |
| Public Policy Polling Margin of error: ± 5.1% Sample size: 368 | April 19–21, 2013 | Hillary Clinton; 68% | Joe Biden; 12% | Elizabeth Warren; 5% | Andrew Cuomo 3%, Deval Patrick 2%, Kirsten Gillibrand 1%, Martin O'Malley 1%, Brian Schweitzer 0%, Mark Warner 0%, Someone Else/Undecided 9% |
| Public Policy Polling Margin of error: ± 5.1% Sample size: 368 | April 19–21, 2013 | Joe Biden; 44% | Elizabeth Warren; 12% | Andrew Cuomo; 9% | Deval Patrick 9%, Kirsten Gillibrand 2%, Martin O'Malley 1%, Brian Schweitzer 1%, Mark Warner 1%, Someone Else/Undecided 21% |
| Public Policy Polling Margin of error: ± 5.1% Sample size: 368 | April 19–21, 2013 | Andrew Cuomo; 23% | Elizabeth Warren; 22% | Deval Patrick; 17% | Kirsten Gillibrand 4%, Martin O'Malley 2%, Brian Schweitzer 1%, Mark Warner 1%, Someone Else/Undecided 30% |
| WMUR/UNH Margin of error: ± 7.1% Sample size: 188 | April 4–9, 2013 | Hillary Clinton; 61% | Joe Biden; 7% | Andrew Cuomo; 3% | Deval Patrick 3%, Mark Warner 2%, Evan Bayh 1%, Cory Booker 1%, John Hickenlooper 0%, Martin O'Malley 0%, Brian Schweitzer 0%, Antonio Villaraigosa 0%, Someone Else 2%, Undecided 22% |
| WMUR/UNH Margin of error: ± 7% Sample size: 201 | Jan. 30–Feb. 5, 2013 | Hillary Clinton; 63% | Joe Biden; 10% | Andrew Cuomo; 5% | Cory Booker 2%, Evan Bayh 1%, Deval Patrick 1%, Brian Schweitzer 1%, John Hickenlooper <1%, Martin O'Malley <1%, Antonio Villaraigosa <1%, Mark Warner <1%, Someone Else 1%, Undecided 16% |

=== New Jersey ===
Delegate count: 126 Pledged, 16 Unpledged Winner: Hillary Clinton
Primary date: June 7, 2016

| Poll source | Date | 1st | 2nd | Other |
|---|---|---|---|---|
| Official Primary results | June 7, 2016 | Hillary Clinton; 63.3% | Bernie Sanders; 36.7% | |
| CBS/YouGov Margin of error: ± 5.4% Sample size: 586 | May 31 – June 3, 2016 | Hillary Clinton; 61% | Bernie Sanders; 34% | Others / Undecided; 5% |
| American Research Group Margin of error: ± -% Sample size: 400 | May 31 – June 2, 2016 | Hillary Clinton; 60% | Bernie Sanders; 37% | Others / Undecided; 3% |
| Quinnipiac Margin of error: ± 3.7% Sample size: 696 | May 10–16, 2016 | Hillary Clinton; 54% | Bernie Sanders; 40% | Others / Undecided; 6% |
| Monmouth University Margin of error: ± 5.7% Sample size: 301 | May 1–3, 2016 | Hillary Clinton; 60% | Bernie Sanders; 32% | Others / Undecided; 8% |
| Rutgers-Eagleton Poll Margin of error: ± 6.3% Sample Size: 292 | April 1–8, 2016 | Hillary Clinton; 51% | Bernie Sanders; 42% | Others / Undecided; 7% |
| Rutgers-Eagleton Poll Margin of error: ± 6.2% Sample Size: 304 | February 6–15, 2016 | Hillary Clinton; 55% | Bernie Sanders; 32% | Others / Undecided; 13% |

Polls in 2015

| Poll source | Date | 1st | 2nd | 3rd | Other |
|---|---|---|---|---|---|
| Rutgers-Eagleton Poll Margin of error: ± ?% Sample Size: 304 | November 30 – December 6, 2015 | Hillary Clinton; 60% | Bernie Sanders; 19% | Martin O'Malley 1% | Other 3%, Don't know 17% |
| Farleigh Dickenson University Margin of error: ± 3.9% Sample Size: 830 | November 9–15, 2015 | Hillary Clinton; 64% | Bernie Sanders; 27% | Martin O'Malley 2% | DK/Refused 3%, Wouldn't Vote 3%, Other 1% |
| Rutgers-Eagleton Poll Margin of error: ± 5.7% Sample size: 367 | October 3–10, 2015 | Hillary Clinton; 49% | Bernie Sanders; 19% | Joe Biden; 10% | Other 3%, Don't know 20% |
| Fairleigh Dickinson University Margin of error: ± 5.5% Sample size: 345 | June 15–21, 2015 | Hillary Clinton; 63% | Bernie Sanders; 15% | Martin O'Malley; 3% | Lincoln Chafee 0%, Other 1%, Wouldn't vote 3%, DK/Refused 14% |
| Fairleigh Dickinson University Margin of error: ± 5.5% Sample size: 323 | April 13–19, 2015 | Hillary Clinton; 62% | | | Another Democratic candidate 9%, Don't know 27%, Refused 1% |
| Quinnipiac University Margin of error: ± 4.2% Sample size: 539 | April 9–14, 2015 | Hillary Clinton; 63% | Elizabeth Warren; 12% | Joe Biden; 10% | Bernie Sanders 3%, Martin O'Malley 1%, Jim Webb 1%, Lincoln Chafee 0%, Other 1%, Wouldn't vote 3%, Don't know 7% |
| Quinnipiac University Margin of error: ± 4.2% Sample size: 539 | April 9–14, 2015 | Joe Biden; 36% | Elizabeth Warren; 28% | Bernie Sanders; 6% | Martin O'Malley 3%, Jim Webb 1%, Lincoln Chafee 0%, Other 1%, Wouldn't vote 4%, Don't know 21% |
| Quinnipiac University Margin of error: ± ? Sample size: ? | January 15–19, 2015 | Hillary Clinton; 65% | Elizabeth Warren; 11% | Joe Biden; 7% | Bernie Sanders 3%, Jim Webb 1%, Martin O'Malley 0%, Other 1%, Wouldn't vote 3%, Don't know 11% |

Polls in 2014

| Poll source | Date | 1st | 2nd | 3rd | Other |
|---|---|---|---|---|---|
| Rutgers-Eagleton Margin of error: ± ? Sample size: 280 | December 3–10, 2014 | Hillary Clinton; 54% | Elizabeth Warren; 6% | Cory Booker; 2% | Joe Biden 1%, Martin O'Malley 1%, Other 3%, Don't know 34% |
| Rutgers-Eagleton Margin of error: ± ? Sample size: 331 | July 28 – August 5, 2014 | Hillary Clinton; 59% | Joe Biden; 3% | Elizabeth Warren; 3% | Cory Booker 2%, Other 4%, Don't know 30% |

Polls in 2013

| Poll source | Date | 1st | 2nd | 3rd | Other |
|---|---|---|---|---|---|
| Fairleigh Dickinson University Margin of error: ± 5.3% Sample size: 337 | August 21–27, 2013 | Hillary Clinton; 63% | Joe Biden; 10% | Andrew Cuomo; 6% | Elizabeth Warren 4%, Other 4%, Undecided 13% |
| Kean University Margin of error: ± ?% Sample size: 420 | April 25–29, 2013 | Hillary Clinton; 67% | Joe Biden; 13% | Andrew Cuomo; 8% | Martin O'Malley 2%, Other 4%, Undecided 6% |

=== New Mexico ===
Delegate count: 34 Pledged, 9 Unpledged Winner: Hillary Clinton
Primary date: June 7, 2016

| Poll source | Date | 1st | 2nd | Other |
|---|---|---|---|---|
| Official Primary results | June 7, 2016 | Hillary Clinton; 51.5% | Bernie Sanders; 48.5% | |
| BWD Global Margin of error: ± 2.5% Sample size: 1,455 | May 25–26, 2016 | Hillary Clinton; 53% | Bernie Sanders; 28% | Others / Undecided; 19% |
| Albuquerque Journal Margin of error: ± 4.9% Sample size: 401 | February 23–25, 2016 | Hillary Clinton; 47% | Bernie Sanders; 33% | Others / Undecided; 20% |

=== New York ===
Delegate count: 247 Pledged, 44 Unpledged Winner: Hillary Clinton
Primary date: April 19, 2016

| Poll source | Date | 1st | 2nd | Other |
|---|---|---|---|---|
| Primary results | April 19, 2016 | Hillary Clinton; 57.5% | Bernie Sanders; 41.6% | Void / Blank Votes; 0.9% |
| Emerson College Margin of error: ± 4.6% Sample size: 438 | April 15–17, 2016 | Hillary Clinton; 55% | Bernie Sanders; 40% | Others / Undecided; 5% |
| CBS News/YouGov Margin of error: ± 4.4% Sample size: 1,033 | April 13–15, 2016 | Hillary Clinton; 53% | Bernie Sanders; 43% | Others / Undecided; 4% |
| NBC/WSJ/Marist Margin of error: ± 4.0% Sample size: 591 | April 10–13, 2016 | Hillary Clinton; 57% | Bernie Sanders; 40% | Others / Undecided; 3% |
| Quinnipiac Margin of error: ± 3.3% Sample size: 860 | April 6–11, 2016 | Hillary Clinton; 53% | Bernie Sanders; 40% | Others / Undecided; 7% |
| Gravis Marketing/ One America News Margin of error: ± 2.9% Sample size: 1,134 | April 5–6, 2016 | Hillary Clinton; 53% | Bernie Sanders; 47% | |
| Siena College Margin of error: ± 4.5% Sample size: 538 | April 6–11, 2016 | Hillary Clinton; 52% | Bernie Sanders; 42% | Others / Undecided; 6% |
| Monmouth Margin of error: ± 5.6% Sample size: 302 | April 8–10, 2016 | Hillary Clinton; 51% | Bernie Sanders; 39% | Others / Undecided; 10% |
| PPP Margin of error: ± 3.8% Sample size: 663 | April 7–10, 2016 | Hillary Clinton; 51% | Bernie Sanders; 40% | Others / Undecided; 9% |
| NBC News/WSJ/Marist Margin of error: ± 4.2% Sample size: 557 | April 6–10, 2016 | Hillary Clinton; 55% | Bernie Sanders; 41% | Others / Undecided; 4% |
| NY1/Baruch Margin of error: ± 4.2% Sample size: 632 | April 5–10, 2016 | Hillary Clinton; 50% | Bernie Sanders; 37% | Others / Undecided; 13% |
| Emerson College Margin of error: ± 5.4% Sample size: 324 | April 6–7, 2016 | Hillary Clinton; 56% | Bernie Sanders; 38% | Others / Undecided; 6% |
| FOX News Margin of error: ± 3.5% Sample size: 801 | April 4–7, 2016 | Hillary Clinton; 53% | Bernie Sanders; 37% | Others / Undecided; 10% |
| CBS News/YouGov Margin of error: ± 3.4% Sample size: 718 | March 29- April 1, 2016 | Hillary Clinton; 53% | Bernie Sanders; 43% | Others / Undecided; 4% |
| Quinnipiac Margin of error: ± 3.7% Sample size: 693 | March 22–29, 2016 | Hillary Clinton; 54% | Bernie Sanders; 42% | Others / Undecided; 4% |
| Emerson College Margin of error: ± 5.0% Sample size: 373 | March 14–16, 2016 | Hillary Clinton; 71% | Bernie Sanders; 23% | Others / Undecided; 6% |
| Siena College Margin of error: ± 6.2% Sample size: 368 | February 28–March 3, 2016 | Hillary Clinton; 55% | Bernie Sanders; 34% | Others / Undecided; 11% |
| Siena College Margin of error: ± 5.6% Sample size: 434 | January 31 – February 3, 2016 | Hillary Clinton; 55% | Bernie Sanders; 34% | Others / Undecided; 11% |

Polls in 2015

| Poll source | Date | 1st | 2nd | 3rd | Other |
|---|---|---|---|---|---|
| Siena College Margin of error: ± 5% Sample size: 374 | September 14–17, 2015 | Hillary Clinton; 45% | Joe Biden; 24% | Bernie Sanders; 23% | None of them 4%, Don't know/No opinion 3% |
| Quinnipiac University Margin of error: ± 4.4% Sample size: 508 | May 28 – June 1, 2015 | Hillary Clinton; 55% | Bernie Sanders; 15% | Joe Biden; 9% | Martin O'Malley 2%, Jim Webb 2%, Lincoln Chafee 1%, Someone else 2%, Wouldn't vote 2%, Undecided 13% |
| Siena College Margin of error: ± 6.3% Sample size: ? | April 19–23, 2015 | Hillary Clinton; 69% | | | Someone else 22% |
| Quinnipiac University Margin of error: ± 4.3% Sample size: 521 | March 11–16, 2015 | Hillary Clinton; 51% | Elizabeth Warren; 11% | Joe Biden; 8% | Andrew Cuomo 7%, Bernie Sanders 5%, Martin O'Malley 1%, Jim Webb 1%, Other 0%, Wouldn't vote 3%, Undecided 12% |

Polls in 2013

| Poll source | Date | 1st | 2nd | 3rd | Other |
|---|---|---|---|---|---|
| Marist College Margin of error: ± 5.7% Sample size: 294 | November 18–20, 2013 | Hillary Clinton; 64% | Andrew Cuomo; 14% | Joe Biden; 8% | Elizabeth Warren 6%, Martin O'Malley 3%, Undecided 5% |

=== North Carolina ===
Delegate count: 107 Pledged, 14 Unpledged Winner: Hillary Clinton
Primary date: March 15, 2016

| Poll source | Date | 1st | 2nd | 3rd | Other |
|---|---|---|---|---|---|
| Primary results | March 15, 2016 | Hillary Clinton; 54.5% | Bernie Sanders; 40.9% | | Others / Uncommitted; 4.6% |
| Public Policy Polling Margin of error: ± 3.6% Sample size: 747 | March 11–13, 2016 | Hillary Clinton; 56% | Bernie Sanders; 37% | | Others / Undecided; 7% |
| High Point University/SurveyUSA Margin of error: ± 3.8% Sample size: 669 | March 9–10, 2016 | Hillary Clinton; 58% | Bernie Sanders; 34% | | Others / Undecided; 8% |
| WRAL/SurveyUSA Margin of error: ± 3.8% Sample size: 687 | March 4–7, 2016 | Hillary Clinton; 57% | Bernie Sanders; 34% | | Others / Undecided; 9% |
| Civitas Margin of error: ± 4.4% Sample size: 500 | March 3–7, 2016 | Hillary Clinton; 57% | Bernie Sanders; 28% | | Others / Undecided; 15% |
| Elon University Margin of error: ± 3.6% Sample size: 728 | February 15–17, 2016 | Hillary Clinton; 47% | Bernie Sanders; 37% | | Others / Undecided 16% |
| SurveyUSA Margin of error: ± 4.7% Sample size: 449 | February 14–16, 2016 | Hillary Clinton; 51% | Bernie Sanders; 36% | | No Preference 4%, Undecided 9% |
| Public Policy Polling Margin of error: ± 4.1; Sample size: 575 | February 14–16, 2016 | Hillary Clinton; 52% | Bernie Sanders; 35% | | Others / Undecided; 13% |
| High Point Margin of error: ± 4.5% Sample size: 478 | January 30 – February 4, 2016 | Hillary Clinton; 55% | Bernie Sanders; 29% | Martin O'Malley; 1% | Not Sure 15% |
| Public Policy Polling Margin of error: ± 4.6% Sample size: 461 | January 18–19, 2016 | Hillary Clinton; 59% | Bernie Sanders; 26% | Martin O'Malley; 5% | Not Sure 10% |
| Civitas Margin of error: ± 4.4% Sample size: 500 | January 13–16, 2016 | Hillary Clinton; 53% | Bernie Sanders; 28% | Martin O'Malley; 2% | Undecided 17% |

Polls in 2015

| Poll source | Date | 1st | 2nd | 3rd | Other |
|---|---|---|---|---|---|
| Public Policy Polling Margin of error: ± 2.8% Sample size: 555 | December 5–7, 2015 | Hillary Clinton; 60% | Bernie Sanders; 21% | Martin O'Malley; 10% | Not Sure 9% |
| Elon University Margin of error: ± 4.32% Sample size: 514 | October 29 – November 2, 2015 | Hillary Clinton; 57% | Bernie Sanders; 24% | Martin O'Malley; 3% | Other 2% Undecided/DK 13% Refused 0.5% |
| Public Policy Polling Margin of error: ± 4.8% Sample size: 421 | October 23–25, 2015 | Hillary Clinton; 61% | Bernie Sanders; 24% | Martin O'Malley; 5% | Lawrence Lessig; 2% |
| Public Policy Polling Margin of error: ± 4.0% Sample size: 605 | September 24–27, 2015 | Hillary Clinton; 37% | Joe Biden; 30% | Bernie; Sanders; 17% | Jim Webb 3%, Lincoln Chafee 2%, Martin O'Malley 1%, Lawrence Lessig 0%, Not sure 10% |
| Elon University Margin of error: ± 5% Sample size: 427 | September 17–21, 2015 | Hillary Clinton; 53.40% | Bernie Sanders; 23.00% | Jim Webb; 1.60% | Lincoln Chafee 0.70%, Lawrence Lessig 0.70%, Martin O'Malley 0.20%, Other 2.10%, Undecided/Don't know 17.10%, Refuse 1.20% |
| Public Policy Polling Margin of error: ± 4.5% Sample size: 477 | August 12–16, 2015 | Hillary Clinton; 55% | Bernie Sanders; 19% | Jim Webb; 5% | Lincoln Chafee 2%, Martin O'Malley 2%, Lawrence Lessig 1% |
| Public Policy Polling Margin of error: ± 5.8% Sample size: 286 | July 2–6, 2015 | Hillary Clinton; 55% | Bernie Sanders; 20% | Jim Webb; 7% | Lincoln Chafee 4%, Martin O'Malley 4%, Someone else/Undecided 11% |
| Public Policy Polling Margin of error: ± 5.9% Sample size: 274 | May 28–31, 2015 | Hillary Clinton; 62% | Bernie Sanders; 14% | Jim Webb; 5% | Lincoln Chafee 4%, Martin O'Malley 4%, Someone else/Undecided 12% |
| Survey USA Margin of error: ± 4.7% Sample size: 442 | April 22–27, 2015 | Hillary Clinton; 56% | Elizabeth Warren; 11% | Joe Biden; 8% | Martin O'Malley 3%, Bernie Sanders 3%, Jim Webb 3%, Other/Undecided 16% |
| Public Policy Polling Margin of error: ± 5.1% Sample size: 370 | April 2–5, 2015 | Hillary Clinton; 53% | Joe Biden; 13% | Elizabeth Warren; 11% | Martin O'Malley 5%, Jim Webb 3%, Bernie Sanders 2%, Someone else/Undecided 12% |
| Civitas Institute Margin of error: ± 5% Sample size: 400 | March 20–23, 2015 | Hillary Clinton; 53% | Elizabeth Warren; 19% | Joe Biden; 9% | Bernie Sanders 5%, Martin O'Malley 2%, Other/Undecided 13% |
| Public Policy Polling Margin of error: ± 4.9% Sample size: 401 | February 24–26, 2015 | Hillary Clinton; 56% | Elizabeth Warren; 13% | Joe Biden; 11% | Martin O'Malley 3%, Jim Webb 3%, Bernie Sanders 1%, Someone else/Undecided 12% |
| Public Policy Polling Margin of error: ± 5% Sample size: 385 | January 29–31, 2015 | Hillary Clinton; 54% | Joe Biden; 18% | Elizabeth Warren; 12% | Bernie Sanders 3%, Martin O'Malley 2%, Jim Webb 2%, Someone else/Not sure 10% |

Polls in 2014

| Poll source | Date | 1st | 2nd | 3rd | Other |
|---|---|---|---|---|---|
| Public Policy Polling Margin of error: ± 5% Sample size: 381 | December 4–7, 2014 | Hillary Clinton; 52% | Joe Biden; 18% | Elizabeth Warren; 7% | Bernie Sanders 5%, Andrew Cuomo 4%, Jim Webb 2%, Martin O'Malley 1%, Brian Schweitzer 0%, Someone else/Not sure 10% |
| Suffolk Margin of error: ± ?% Sample size: 254 | August 16–19, 2014 | Hillary Clinton; 57.09% | Joe Biden; 14.96% | Elizabeth Warren; 9.06% | Martin O'Malley 2.76%, Andrew Cuomo 1.97%, Undecided 11.42%, Refused 2.76% |
| Civitas Institute Margin of error: ± ?% Sample size: 336 | July 28–29, 2014 | Hillary Clinton; 40% | Elizabeth Warren; 12% | Joe Biden; 9% | Andrew Cuomo 3%, Bernie Sanders 2%, Howard Dean 1%, Jim Webb 1%, Amy Klobuchar 0%, Martin O'Malley 0%, Won't vote in Democratic primary 15%, Undecided 14%, Refused 3%, Other 0% |

=== North Dakota ===
Delegate count: 18 Pledged, 5 Unpledged Winner: Bernie Sanders
Primary date: June 7, 2016

| Poll source | Date | 1st | 2nd | Other |
|---|---|---|---|---|
| Caucus results | June 7, 2016 | Bernie Sanders; 64.2% | Hillary Clinton; 25.6% | Others 10.2% |

=== Ohio ===
Delegate count: 143 Pledged, 16 Unpledged Winner: Hillary Clinton
Primary date: March 15, 2016

| Poll source | Date | 1st | 2nd | Other |
|---|---|---|---|---|
| Primary results | March 15, 2016 | Hillary Clinton; 56.1% | Bernie Sanders; 43.1% | Other; 0.8% |
| ARG Margin of error: ± 5.0% Sample size: 400 | March 12–13, 2016 | Hillary Clinton; 52% | Bernie Sanders; 45% | Others / Undecided; 3% |
| Monmouth Margin of error: ± 5.6% Sample size: 302 | March 11–13, 2016 | Hillary Clinton; 54% | Bernie Sanders; 40% | Others / Undecided; 6% |
| Quinnipiac Margin of error: ± 4.2% Sample size: 543 | March 8–13, 2016 | Hillary Clinton; 51% | Bernie Sanders; 46% | Others / Undecided; 4% |
| Public Policy Polling Margin of error: ± 4.4% Sample size: 502 | March 11–12, 2016 | Hillary Clinton; 46% | Bernie Sanders; 41% | Others / Undecided; 13% |
| CBS News/YouGov Margin of error: ± 5.3% Sample size: 777 | March 9–11, 2016 | Hillary Clinton; 52% | Bernie Sanders; 43% | Others / Undecided; 5% |
| NBC News/Wall Street Journal/Marist Margin of error: ± 4.6% Sample size: 453 | March 4–10, 2016 | Hillary Clinton; 58% | Bernie Sanders; 38% | Others / Undecided; 4% |
| Quinnipiac Margin of error: ± 4.3% Sample size: 521 | March 2–7, 2016 | Hillary Clinton; 52% | Bernie Sanders; 43% | Others / Undecided; 5% |
| Public Polling Policy Margin of error: ± 4.4% Sample size: 508 | March 4–6, 2016 | Hillary Clinton; 56% | Bernie Sanders; 35% | Others / Undecided; 9% |
| CNN/ORC Margin of error: ± 5.5% Sample size: 294 | March 2–6, 2016 | Hillary Clinton; 63% | Bernie Sanders; 33% | Others / Undecided; 4% |
| Quinnipiac University Margin of error: ± 4.3% Sample size: 518 | February 16–20, 2016 | Hillary Clinton; 55% | Bernie Sanders; 40% | Others / Undecided; 5% |
| BW Community Research Institute Margin of error: ± 5% Sample size: 385 | February 11–20, 2016 | Bernie Sanders; 45% | Hillary Clinton; 44% | Others / Undecided; 11% |
| Public Policy Polling Margin of error: ± ?% Sample size: 1,138 | January 12–14, 2016 | Hillary Clinton; 53% | Bernie Sanders; 37% | Not sure 10% |

Polls in 2015

| Poll source | Date | 1st | 2nd | 3rd | Other |
|---|---|---|---|---|---|
| Quinnipiac University Margin of error: ± 4.9% Sample size: 396 | September 25 – October 5, 2015 | Hillary Clinton; 40% | Joe Biden; 21% | Bernie Sanders; 19% | Undecided 11% |
| Quinnipiac University Margin of error: ± 5.2% Sample size: 353 | August 7–18, 2015 | Hillary Clinton; 47% | Bernie Sanders; 17% | Joe Biden; 14% | Jim Webb 1%, Martin O'Malley 0%, Lincoln Chafee 0%, Other 3%, Wouldn't vote 6%, Undecided 12% |
| Quinnipiac University Margin of error: ± 5% Sample size: 388 | June 4–15, 2015 | Hillary Clinton; 60% | Joe Biden; 13% | Bernie Sanders; 10% | Martin O'Malley 1%, Lincoln Chafee 0%, Jim Webb 0%, Other 1%, Wouldn't vote 3%, Undecided 11% |
| Public Policy Polling Margin of error: ± 5.2% Sample size: 360 | June 4–7, 2015 | Hillary Clinton; 61% | Bernie Sanders; 13% | Michael Bloomberg; 7% | Lincoln Chafee 2%, Martin O'Malley 2%, Jim Webb 1%, Not sure 13% |
| Quinnipiac University Margin of error: ± 5.4% Sample size: 324 | March 17–28, 2015 | Hillary Clinton; 54% | Elizabeth Warren; 14% | Joe Biden; 9% | Martin O'Malley 3%, Bernie Sanders 3%, Jim Webb 2%, Other 1%, Wouldn't vote 3%, Undecided 12% |
| Quinnipiac University Margin of error: ± 5.4% Sample size: 324 | March 17–28, 2015 | Joe Biden; 34% | Elizabeth Warren; 25% | Martin O'Malley; 5% | Bernie Sanders 5%, Jim Webb 2%, Other 1%, Wouldn't vote 3%, Undecided 24% |
| Quinnipiac University Margin of error: ± 5.5% Sample size: 315 | January 22 – February 1, 2015 | Hillary Clinton; 51% | Elizabeth Warren; 14% | Joe Biden; 7% | Bernie Sanders 5%, Martin O'Malley 1%, Jim Webb 0%, Other 2%, Wouldn't vote 4%, Undecided 15% |
| Quinnipiac University Margin of error: ± 5.5% Sample size: 315 | January 22 – February 1, 2015 | Joe Biden; 28% | Elizabeth Warren; 24% | Bernie Sanders; 7% | Martin O'Malley 2%, Jim Webb 2%, Other 4%, Wouldn't vote 5%, Undecided 28% |

=== Oklahoma ===
Delegate count: 38 Pledged, 4 Unpledged Winner: Bernie Sanders
Primary date: March 1, 2016

| Poll source | Date | 1st | 2nd | 3rd | Other |
|---|---|---|---|---|---|
| Official Primary results | March 1, 2016 | Bernie Sanders; 51.9% | Hillary Clinton; 41.5% | | Others; 6.6% |
| Monmouth Margin of error: ± 5.7% Sample size: 300 | February 25–28, 2016 | Bernie Sanders; 48% | Hillary Clinton; 43% | | Others / Undecided; 9% |
| Sooner Poll/News 9/News on 6 Margin of error: ± 4.3% Sample size: 510 | February 23–25, 2016 | Hillary Clinton; 40% | Bernie Sanders; 31% | | Others / Undecided; 29% |
| Public Policy Polling Margin of error: ± 4.2% Sample size: 542 | February 14–16, 2016 | Hillary Clinton; 46% | Bernie Sanders; 44% | | Undecided 9% |
| Sooner Poll Margin of error: ± 5.0% Sample size: 360 | February 6–9, 2016 | Hillary Clinton; 43.9% | Bernie Sanders; 28% | | Undecided 28.1% |
| Sooner Poll Margin of error: ± 5.1% Sample size: 369 | November 12–15, 2015 | Hillary Clinton; 46.6% | Bernie Sanders; 12.2% | Martin O'Malley; 2.2% | Undecided 39.1% |
| The Oklahoman/Cole Hargrave Snodgrass & Associates Margin of error: ± 4.3% Sample size: 550 | October 19–22, 2015 | Hillary Clinton; 30% | Bernie Sanders; 21% | Martin O'Malley; 1% | Undecided 46% |

=== Oregon ===
Delegate count: 61 Pledged, 13 Unpledged Winner: Bernie Sanders
Primary date: May 17, 2016

| Poll source | Date | 1st | 2nd | Other |
|---|---|---|---|---|
| Official Primary Results | May 17, 2016 | Bernie Sanders; 56.2% | Hillary Clinton; 42.1% | Misc. 1.7% |
| DHM Research Margin of error: ± 5.6% Sample size: 901 | May 6–9, 2016 | Hillary Clinton; 48% | Bernie Sanders; 33% | Others / Undecided; 19% |
| KATU-TV/SurveyUSA Margin of error: ± 4.0% Sample size: 630 | March 28-April 1, 2016 | Hillary Clinton; 37% | Bernie Sanders; 36% | Others / Undecided; 27% |
| DHM Research Margin of error: ± 7% Sample size: 206 | July 22–27, 2015 | Hillary Clinton; 44% | Bernie Sanders; 39% | Others / Undecided; 17% |

=== Pennsylvania ===
Delegate count: 189 Pledged, 21 Unpledged Winner: Hillary Clinton
Primary date: April 26, 2016

| Poll source | Date | 1st | 2nd | 3rd | Other |
|---|---|---|---|---|---|
| Official Primary results | April 26, 2016 | Hillary Clinton; 55.6% | Bernie Sanders; 43.5% | | Other; 0.9% |
| FOX 29/Opinion Savvy Margin of error: ± 3.2% Sample size: 942 | April 24, 2016 | Hillary Clinton; 52% | Bernie Sanders; 41% | | Others / Undecided; 7% |
| CPEC LLC Margin of error: ± 2.3% Sample size: 665 | April 22–24, 2016 | Hillary Clinton; 63% | Bernie Sanders; 37% | | |
| Public Policy Polling Margin of error: ± 3.6% Sample size: 728 | April 22–24, 2016 | Hillary Clinton; 51% | Bernie Sanders; 41% | | Others / Undecided; 9% |
| American Research Group Margin of error: ± 5.0% Sample size: 400 | April 21–24, 2016 | Hillary Clinton; 58% | Bernie Sanders; 38% | | Others / Undecided; 4% |
| Harper Polling Margin of error: ± 3.9% Sample size: 641 | April 21–23, 2016 | Hillary Clinton; 61% | Bernie Sanders; 33% | | Others / Undecided; 6% |
| CBS/YouGov Margin of error: ± 6.7% Sample size: 831 | April 20–22, 2016 | Hillary Clinton; 51% | Bernie Sanders; 43% | | Others / Undecided; 6% |
| NBC/WSJ/Marist Margin of error: ± 1.9% Sample size: 734 | April 18–20, 2016 | Hillary Clinton; 55% | Bernie Sanders; 40% | | Others / Undecided; 5% |
| Monmouth Margin of error: ± 5.6% Sample size: 302 | April 17–19, 2016 | Hillary Clinton; 52% | Bernie Sanders; 39% | | Others / Undecided; 9% |
| Franklin & Marshall College Margin of error: ± 5.3% Sample size: 510 | April 11–18, 2016 | Hillary Clinton; 58% | Bernie Sanders; 31% | | Others / Undecided; 11% |
| FOX News Margin of error: ± 3.5% Sample size: 805 | April 4–7, 2016 | Hillary Clinton; 49% | Bernie Sanders; 38% | | Others / Undecided; 13% |
| Quinnipiac Margin of error: ± 4.3% Sample size: 514 | March 30-April 4, 2016 | Hillary Clinton; 50% | Bernie Sanders; 44% | | Others / Undecided; 6% |
| Harper Margin of error: ± 4.0% Sample size: 603 | April 2–3, 2016 | Hillary Clinton; 55% | Bernie Sanders; 33% | | Others / Undecided; 12% |
| Franklin & Marshall Margin of error: ± 4.7% Sample size: 408 | March 14–20, 2016 | Hillary Clinton; 53% | Bernie Sanders; 28% | | Others / Undecided; 19% |
| Harper Margin of error: ± 5.3% Sample size: 347 | March 1–2, 2016 | Hillary Clinton; 57% | Bernie Sanders; 27% | | Others / Undecided; 16% |
| Franklin & Marshall College Margin of error: ± 3.1% Sample size: 486 | February 13–21, 2016 | Hillary Clinton; 48% | Bernie Sanders; 27% | | Others / Undecided; 25% |
| Robert Morris University Margin of error: ± 4.5% Sample size: 511 | February 11–16, 2016 | Hillary Clinton; 48% | Bernie Sanders; 41% | | Others / Undecided; 11% |
| Harper Margin of error: ± 3.8% Sample size: 640 | January 22–23, 2016 | Hillary Clinton; 55% | Bernie Sanders; 28% | Martin O'Malley; 4% | Undecided 13% |
| Franklin & Marshall Margin of error: ± 3.6% Sample size: 361 | January 18–23, 2016 | Hillary Clinton; 46% | Bernie Sanders; 29% | Martin O'Malley; 2% | Other 7%, Undecided 16% |

Polls in 2015

| Poll source | Date | 1st | 2nd | 3rd | Other |
|---|---|---|---|---|---|
| Franklin & Marshall Margin of error: ± 3.9% Sample size: 303 | October 19–25, 2015 | Hillary Clinton; 52% | Bernie Sanders; 18% | Martin O'Malley; 0% | Other 12%, Undecided 18% |
| Public Policy Polling Margin of error: ± 4.8% Sample size: 416 | October 8–11, 2015 | Hillary Clinton; 40% | Bernie Sanders; 22% | Joe Biden; 20% | Lincoln Chafee 3%, Martin O'Malley 2%, Lawrence Lessig 1%, Jim Webb 1%, Not Sure 12% |
| Quinnipiac University Margin of error: ± 4.6% Sample size: 462 | August 7–18, 2015 | Hillary Clinton; 45% | Bernie Sanders; 19% | Joe Biden; 17% | Jim Webb 1%, Martin O'Malley 1%, Lincoln Chafee 0%, Other 2%, Wouldn't vote 3%, Undecided 12% |
| Quinnipiac University Margin of error: ± 4.9% Sample size: 402 | June 4–15, 2015 | Hillary Clinton; 53% | Joe Biden; 15% | Bernie Sanders; 10% | Jim Webb 2%, Martin O'Malley 1%, Lincoln Chafee 0%, Other 1%, Wouldn't vote 4%, Undecided 15% |
| Public Policy Polling Margin of error: ± 5% Sample size: 385 | May 21–24, 2015 | Hillary Clinton; 63% | Bernie Sanders; 14% | Martin O'Malley; 6% | Lincoln Chafee 3%, Jim Webb 3%, Not sure 12% |
| Quinnipiac University Margin of error: ± 4.8% Sample size: 415 | March 17–28, 2015 | Hillary Clinton; 48% | Elizabeth Warren; 15% | Joe Biden; 13% | Martin O'Malley 1%, Bernie Sanders 1%, Jim Webb 1%, Other 2%, Wouldn't vote 4%, Undecided 15% |
| Quinnipiac University Margin of error: ± 4.8% Sample size: 415 | March 17–28, 2015 | Joe Biden; 34% | Elizabeth Warren; 27% | Martin O'Malley; 4% | Bernie Sanders 2%, Jim Webb 1%, Other 3%, Wouldn't vote 5%, Undecided 25% |
| Quinnipiac University Margin of error: ± 5% Sample size: 392 | January 22 – February 1, 2015 | Hillary Clinton; 54% | Elizabeth Warren; 12% | Joe Biden; 10% | Martin O'Malley 2%, Bernie Sanders 2%, Jim Webb 1%, Other 1%, Wouldn't vote 4%, Undecided 15% |
| Quinnipiac University Margin of error: ± 5% Sample size: 392 | January 22 – February 1, 2015 | Joe Biden; 34% | Elizabeth Warren; 21% | Martin O'Malley; 5% | Jim Webb 4%, Bernie Sanders 3%, Other 2%, Wouldn't vote 5%, Undecided 26% |
| Public Policy Polling Margin of error: ± 4.4% Sample size: 494 | January 15–18, 2015 | Hillary Clinton; 58% | Joe Biden; 13% | Elizabeth Warren; 11% | Bernie Sanders 5%, Martin O'Malley 1%, Jim Webb 1%, Someone else/Undecided 11% |

Polls in 2014

| Poll source | Date | 1st | 2nd | 3rd | Other |
|---|---|---|---|---|---|
| Public Policy Polling Margin of error: ± 5% Sample size: 382 | May 30 – June 1, 2014 | Hillary Clinton; 65% | Joe Biden; 9% | Andrew Cuomo; 5% | Elizabeth Warren 5%, Cory Booker 4%, Kirsten Gillibrand 1%, Brian Schweitzer 1%, Mark Warner 1%, Martin O'Malley 0%, Someone else/Not sure 10% |
| Franklin & Marshall College Margin of error: ± 4.3% Sample size: 524 | March 25–31, 2014 | Hillary Clinton; 55% | Joe Biden; 5% | Elizabeth Warren; 4% | Andrew Cuomo 2%, Howard Dean 0%, Other 5%, Undecided 29% |
| Franklin & Marshall College Margin of error: ± 4.2% Sample size: 548 | February 18–23, 2014 | Hillary Clinton; 58% | Elizabeth Warren; 7% | Joe Biden; 6% | Andrew Cuomo 2%, Howard Dean 1%, Other 3%, Undecided 23% |

Polls in 2013

| Poll source | Date | 1st | 2nd | 3rd | Other |
|---|---|---|---|---|---|
| Public Policy Polling Margin of error: ± 4.7% Sample size: 436 | November 22–25, 2013 | Hillary Clinton; 61% | Joe Biden; 13% | Elizabeth Warren; 11% | Andrew Cuomo 3%, Cory Booker 2%, Kirsten Gillibrand 1%, Martin O'Malley 0%, Brian Schweitzer 0%, Mark Warner 0%, Someone Else/Undecided 9% |

=== Rhode Island ===
Delegate count: 24 Pledged, 9 Unpledged Winner: Bernie Sanders
Primary date: April 26, 2016

| Poll source | Date | 1st | 2nd | Other |
|---|---|---|---|---|
| Certified Primary results | April 26, 2016 | Bernie Sanders; 54.7% | Hillary Clinton; 43.1% | Others / Uncommitted; 2.2% |
| Public Policy Polling Margin of error: ± 3.8% Sample size: 668 | April 22–24, 2016 | Bernie Sanders; 49% | Hillary Clinton; 45% | Others / Undecided; 6% |
| Brown University Margin of error: ± 4.0% Sample size: 436 | April 19–21, 2016 | Hillary Clinton; 43% | Bernie Sanders; 34% | Others / Undecided; 23% |
| Brown University Margin of error: ± ?% Sample size: 394 | February 22–23, 2016 | Hillary Clinton; 49% | Bernie Sanders; 40% | Others / Undecided; 11% |
| Brown University Margin of error: ± ?% Sample size: 396 | February 17–20, 2016 | Bernie Sanders; 48% | Hillary Clinton; 41% | Others / Undecided; 11% |

Primary Results

=== South Carolina ===
Delegate count: 53 Pledged, 6 Unpledged Winner: Hillary Clinton
Primary date: 27 February 2016

| Poll source | Date | 1st | 2nd | 3rd | Other |
|---|---|---|---|---|---|
| Official Primary results | February 27, 2016 | Hillary Clinton; 73.4% | Bernie Sanders; 26.0% | | Others; 0.6% |
| Clemson Margin of error: 3.0% Sample size: 650 | February 20–25, 2016 | Hillary Clinton; 64% | Bernie Sanders; 14% | | Others / Undecided; 22% |
| Emerson College Margin of error: 6.0% Sample size: 266 | February 22–24, 2016 | Hillary Clinton; 60% | Bernie Sanders; 37% | | Others / Undecided; 3% |
| NBC/WSJ/Marist Margin of error: 4.8% Sample size: 425 | February 15–17, 2016 | Hillary Clinton; 60% | Bernie Sanders; 32% | | Other; 8% |
| Bloomberg Politics Margin of error: 4.9% Sample size: 403 | February 13–17, 2016 | Hillary Clinton; 53% | Bernie Sanders; 31% | | Not sure 16% |
| ARG Margin of error: 5% Sample size: 400 | February 14–16, 2016 | Hillary Clinton; 61% | Bernie Sanders; 31% | Someone else 1% | No opinion 7% |
| Public Policy Polling Margin of error: ± 4% Sample size: 525 | February 14–15, 2016 | Hillary Clinton; 55% | Bernie Sanders; 34% | | Undecided 12% |
| CNN/ORC Margin of error: 6% Sample size: 289 | February 10–15, 2016 | Hillary Clinton; 56% | Bernie Sanders; 38% | Someone else 3% | No opinion 4% |
| ARG Margin of error: ± 5.0% Sample size: 400 | February 12–13, 2016 | Hillary Clinton; 65% | Bernie Sanders; 27% | | Other 1%, Undecided 7% |
| YouGov/CBS News Margin of error: ± 8.7% Sample size: 404 | February 10–12, 2016 | Hillary Clinton; 59% | Bernie Sanders; 40% | | No Preference 1% |
| NBC/WSJ/Marist Margin of error: ± 4.6% Sample size: 446 | January 17–23, 2016 | Hillary Clinton; 64% | Bernie Sanders; 27% | Martin O'Malley; 2% | Undecided 7% |
| YouGov/CBS News Margin of error: ± 9.4% Sample size: 388 | January 17–21, 2016 | Hillary Clinton; 60% | Bernie Sanders; 38% | Martin O'Malley; 0% | Undecided 2% |
| SC New Democrats Margin of error: ± ?% Sample size: 583 | January 12–15, 2016 | Hillary Clinton; 47% | Bernie Sanders; 28% | Martin O'Malley; 2% | Undecided 22% |

Polls in 2015

| Poll source | Date | 1st | 2nd | 3rd | Other |
|---|---|---|---|---|---|
| YouGov/CBS News Margin of error: ± 5.0% Sample size: 420 | December 13–17, 2015 | Hillary Clinton; 67% | Bernie Sanders; 31% | Martin O'Malley; 2% | No Preference 0% |
| Fox News Margin of error: ± 5.0% Sample size: 364 | December 5–8, 2015 | Hillary Clinton; 65% | Bernie Sanders; 21% | Martin O'Malley; 3% | Other 1%, None of the Above 7%, DK 3% |
| YouGov/CBS News Margin of error: ± 6.0% Sample size: 420 | November 15–19, 2015 | Hillary Clinton; 72% | Bernie Sanders; 25% | Martin O'Malley; 2% | Undecided 1% |
| Public Policy Polling Margin of error: ± 4.9% Sample size: 400 | November 7–8, 2015 | Hillary Clinton; 72% | Bernie Sanders; 18% | Martin O'Malley; 5% | Unsure 5% |
| Monmouth University Margin of error: ± 4.9% Sample size: 400 | November 5–8, 2015 | Hillary Clinton; 69% | Bernie Sanders; 21% | Martin O'Malley; 1% | Other 1% No Preference 8% |
| Winthrop University Margin of error: ± 3.4% Sample size: 832 | October 24 – November 1, 2015 | Hillary Clinton; 71% | Bernie Sanders; 15% | Martin O'Malley; 2% | Refused 2% Undecided 9% Wouldn't Vote 1% |
| YouGov/CBS News Margin of error: ± 8.2% Sample size: 427 | October 15–22, 2015 | Hillary Clinton; 68% | Bernie Sanders; 25% | Martin O'Malley; 1% | Jim Webb 1%, Lincoln Chafee 0%, Lawrence Lessig 0%, No preference 4% |
| Clemson Palmetto Margin of error: 4.0% Sample size: 600 | October 13–23, 2015 | Hillary Clinton; 43% | Bernie Sanders; 6% | Martin O'Malley; 1% | Undecided 50% |
| CNN/ORC Margin of error: 5.5% Sample size: 301 | October 3–10, 2015 | Hillary Clinton; 49% | Joe Biden; 24% | Bernie Sanders; 18% | Martin O'Malley 3%, Someone else 1%, None/No one 1%, No opinion 4% |
| Gravis Marketing Margin of error: ± ?% Sample size: ? | September 25–27, 2015 | Hillary Clinton; 50% | Joe Biden; 19% | Bernie Sanders; 13% | Lincoln Chafee 1%, Jim Webb <1%, Martin O'Malley <1%, Unsure 17% |
| YouGov/CBS News Margin of error: ± 6.8% Sample size: 528 | Sep. 3–10, 2015 | Hillary Clinton; 46% | Bernie Sanders; 23% | Joe Biden; 22% | No preference 8%, Jim Webb 1%, Lincoln Chafee 0%, Martin O'Malley 0% |
| Public Policy Polling Margin of error: ± 5.6% Sample size: 302 | Sep. 3–6, 2015 | Hillary Clinton; 54% | Joe Biden; 24% | Bernie Sanders; 9% | Martin O’Malley, Jim Webb 2%; Lincoln Chafee 1% |
| Gravis Marketing Margin of error: ± 4.0% Sample size: 209 | July 29–30, 2015 | Hillary Clinton; 78% | Bernie Sanders; 8% | Elizabeth Warren; 6% | Joe Biden 6%, Jim Webb 1%, Martin O'Malley 1%, Lincoln Chafee 1% |
| Morning Consult Margin of error: ? Sample size: 309 | May 31 – June 8, 2015 | Hillary Clinton; 56% | Joe Biden; 15% | Bernie Sanders; 10% | Martin O'Malley 3%, Jim Webb 2%, Lincoln Chafee 1%, Someone else 2% Undecided 11% |
| Public Policy Polling Margin of error: ± 6.2% Sample size: 252 | February 12–15, 2015 | Hillary Clinton; 59% | Joe Biden; 18% | Elizabeth Warren; 10% | Martin O'Malley 3%, Bernie Sanders 1%, Jim Webb 1%, Other/Undecided 8% |
| NBC News/Marist Margin of error: ± 5.2% Sample size: 352 | February 3–10, 2015 | Hillary Clinton; 65% | Joe Biden; 20% | Bernie Sanders; 3% | Martin O'Malley 2%, Jim Webb 2%, Undecided 8% |

Polls in 2014

| Poll source | Date | 1st | 2nd | 3rd | Other |
|---|---|---|---|---|---|
| Clemson University Margin of error: ±6% Sample size: 400 | May 26 – June 2, 2014 | Hillary Clinton; 50% | Joe Biden; 12% | Andrew Cuomo; 2% | Martin O'Malley 1%, Deval Patrick 0%, Brian Schweitzer 0%, Undecided/Don't know 35% |

=== South Dakota ===
Delegate count: 20 Pledged, 5 Unpledged Winner: Hillary Clinton
Primary date: June 7, 2016

| Poll source | Date | 1st | 2nd | Others / Undecided |
|---|---|---|---|---|
| Official Primary results | June 7, 2016 | Hillary Clinton; 51.0% | Bernie Sanders; 49.0% | |
| Targeted Persuasion Margin of error: ±3.31% Sample size: 874 | May 23–24, 2016 | Hillary Clinton; 50% | Bernie Sanders; 47% | Undecided; 3% |

=== Tennessee ===
Delegate count: 67 Pledged, 9 Unpledged Winner: Hillary Clinton
Primary date: March 1, 2016

| Poll source | Date | 1st | 2nd | 3rd | Other |
|---|---|---|---|---|---|
| Primary results | March 1, 2016 | Hillary Clinton; 66.1% | Bernie Sanders; 32.5% | | Others / Uncommitted; 1.5% |
| SurveyMonkey Margin of error: ? Sample size: 533 | February 22–29, 2016 | Hillary Clinton; 54% | Bernie Sanders; 37% | | Others / Undecided; 9% |
| NBC/WSJ/Marist Margin of error: ± 3.8; Sample size: 405 | February 22–25, 2016 | Hillary Clinton; 60% | Bernie Sanders; 34% | | Other; 6% |
| Public Policy Polling Margin of error: ± 4.4; Sample size: 500 | February 14–16, 2016 | Hillary Clinton; 58% | Bernie Sanders; 32% | | |
| Vanderbilt/PSRA Margin of error: 6.7% Sample size: 346 | November 11–23, 2015 | Hillary Clinton; 48% | Bernie Sanders; 28% | Martin O'Malley; 3% | Undecided 10%, Other 5%, Wouldn't Vote 4% |
| MTSU Margin of error: ± 4% Sample size: 603 | October 25–27, 2015 | Hillary Clinton; 44% | Bernie Sanders 16% | | Don't know 25% |

=== Texas ===
Delegate count: 222 Pledged, 30 Unpledged Winner: Hillary Clinton
Primary date: March 1, 2016

| Poll source | Date | 1st | 2nd | 3rd | Other |
|---|---|---|---|---|---|
| Primary results | March 1, 2016 | Hillary Clinton; 65.2% | Bernie Sanders; 33.2% | | Others; 1.6% |
| Emerson Margin of error: ± 5.9% Sample size: 275 | February 26–28, 2016 | Hillary Clinton; 68% | Bernie Sanders; 26% | | Others / Undecided; 6% |
| American Research Group Margin of error: ± 5.0% Sample size: 400 | February 26–28, 2016 | Hillary Clinton; 58% | Bernie Sanders; 38% | | Others / Undecided; 4% |
| YouGov/CBS News Margin of error: ± 6.9% Sample size: 750 | February 22–26, 2016 | Hillary Clinton; 61% | Bernie Sanders; 37% | | Others / Undecided; 2% |
| Monmouth Margin of error: ± 5.6; Sample size: 304 | February 22–24, 2016 | Hillary Clinton; 64% | Bernie Sanders; 30% | | Others / Undecided; 6% |
| Emerson College Margin of error: ± 5.4; Sample size: 328 | February 21–23, 2016 | Hillary Clinton; 56% | Bernie Sanders; 40% | | Others / Undecided; 4% |
| NBC News/Wall St. Jrnl Margin of error: ± 4.9; Sample size: 405 | February 18–23, 2016 | Hillary Clinton; 59% | Bernie Sanders; 38% | | Others / Undecided; 3% |
| KTVT-CBS 11 Margin of error: ± 3.8; Sample size: 675 | February 22, 2016 | Hillary Clinton; 61% | Bernie Sanders; 29% | | Others / Undecided; 10% |
| TEGNA/SurveyUSA Margin of error: ± 4.1; Sample size: 569 | February 21–22, 2016 | Hillary Clinton; 61% | Bernie Sanders; 32% | | Others / Undecided; 7% |
| Austin American-Statesman Margin of error: ± 5.0; Sample size: 411 | February 19–22, 2016 | Hillary Clinton; 66% | Bernie Sanders; 26% | | Others / Undecided; 8% |
| UT/TT Margin of error: ±4.57; Sample Size: ? Dem Voters | February 12–19, 2016 | Hillary Clinton; 57% | Bernie Sanders; 40% | Rocky de la Fuente; 2% | Martin O'Malley 1% Willie Wilson 1% |
| Public Policy Polling Margin of error: ± 4.3; Sample size: 514 | February 14–16, 2016 | Hillary Clinton; 57% | Bernie Sanders; 34% | | |

Polls in 2015

| Poll source | Date | 1st | 2nd | 3rd | Other |
|---|---|---|---|---|---|
| University of Texas/Texas Tribune Margin of error ± 4.57% Sample Size: 459 | October 30 – November 8, 2015 | Hillary Clinton; 61% | Bernie Sanders; 30% | Martin O'Malley 1% | Lawrence Lessig 0% No Opinion 7% |
| CBS-DFW Margin of error: ± 3.09% Sample size: 1008 | October 23–24, 2015 | Hillary Clinton; 59% | Bernie Sanders; 10% | Martin O'Malley; 3% | Undecided 28% |
| Texas Lyceum Margin of error: ± 7.15% Sample size: 185 | September 8–21, 2015 | Hillary Clinton; 36% | Bernie Sanders; 24% | Joe Biden; 15% | Jim Webb 1%, Martin O'Malley 0%, Lincoln Chafee 0% Undecided 23% |
| UoT/Texas Tribune Margin of error: ± 4.58% Sample size: 457 | June 5–14, 2015 | Hillary Clinton; 53% | Bernie Sanders; 15% | Joe Biden; 8% | Elizabeth Warren 8%, Andrew Cuomo 1%, Martin O'Malley 1%, Jim Webb 1%, Lincoln Chafee 1% Undecided 12% |
| UoT/Texas Tribune Margin of error: ± 4.89% Sample size: 401 | February 6–15, 2015 | Hillary Clinton; 62% | Elizabeth Warren; 12% | Joe Biden; 6% | Bernie Sanders 5%, Martin O'Malley 1%, Jim Webb 1%, Undecided 14% |

Polls in 2014

| Poll source | Date | 1st | 2nd | 3rd | Other |
|---|---|---|---|---|---|
| UoT/Texas Tribune Margin of error: ± 4.73% Sample size: 429 | October 10–19, 2014 | Hillary Clinton; 60% | Elizabeth Warren; 13% | Joe Biden; 10% | Andrew Cuomo 2%, Brian Schweitzer 1%, Jim Webb 1%, Martin O'Malley 0%, Undecided 13% |
| UoT/Texas Tribune Margin of error: ± 4.75% Sample size: 426 | May 30 – June 8, 2014 | Hillary Clinton; 64% | Elizabeth Warren; 15% | Joe Biden; 8% | Andrew Cuomo 2%, Brian Schweitzer 1%, Martin O'Malley 0%, Undecided 10% |

Polls in 2013

| Poll source | Date | 1st | 2nd | 3rd | Other |
|---|---|---|---|---|---|
| UoT/Texas Tribune Margin of error: ± 4.82% Sample size: 414 | October 18–29, 2013 | Hillary Clinton; 67% | Joe Biden; 7% | Elizabeth Warren; 5% | Andrew Cuomo 1%, Martin O'Malley 1%, Brian Schweitzer 1%, Mark Warner 1%, Kirsten Gillibrand 0%, Don't Know 17% |
| UoT/Texas Tribune Margin of error: ± 5.89% Sample size: 376 | May 31 – June 9, 2013 | Hillary Clinton; 66% | Joe Biden; 11% | Andrew Cuomo; 1% | Kirsten Gillibrand 1%, Mark Warner 1%, Martin O'Malley 0%, Brian Schweitzer 0%, Don't Know 19% |

=== Utah ===
Delegate count: 33 Pledged, 4 Unpledged Winner: Bernie Sanders
Caucus date: March 22, 2016

| Poll source | Date | 1st | 2nd | 3rd | Other |
|---|---|---|---|---|---|
| Caucus results | March 24, 2016 | Bernie Sanders; 79.21% | Hillary Clinton; 20.33% | | Other; 0.46% |
| Dan Jones & Associates Margin of error: ± 7% Sample size: 250 | March 8–15, 2016 | Bernie Sanders; 52% | Hillary Clinton; 44% | | |
| Dan Jones & Associates Margin of error: ± ? Sample size: 625 | February 10–15, 2016 | Hillary Clinton; 51% | Bernie Sanders; 44% | | |
| SurveyUSA Margin of error: ± 7.2% Sample size: 188 | January 6–13, 2016 | Hillary Clinton; 50% | Bernie Sanders; 40% | | Other/Undecided 10% |
| Dan Jones & Associates Margin of error: ± 3.9% Sample size: 624 | November 5–14, 2015 | Hillary Clinton; 54% | Bernie Sanders; 34% | Martin O'Malley 3% | Don't Know 5% |
| Dan Jones & Associates Margin of error: ? Sample size: ? | September 8–17, 2015 | Bernie Sanders; 31% | Hillary Clinton; 30% | Joe Biden; 20% | Other/Undecided 19% |
| Dan Jones & Associates Margin of error: ± ? Sample size: ? | July 14–21, 2015 | Hillary Clinton; 50% | Bernie Sanders; 30% | Joe Biden; 12% | Other/Undecided 8% |
| Dan Jones & Associates Margin of error: ± ? Sample size: ? | March 3–5, 2015 | Hillary Clinton; 56% | Elizabeth Warren; 25% | Joe Biden; 4% | Other/Undecided 15% |

=== Vermont ===
Delegate count: 16 Pledged, 10 Unpledged Winner: Bernie Sanders
Primary date: March 1, 2016

| Poll source | Date | 1st | 2nd | Other |
|---|---|---|---|---|
| Official Primary results | March 1, 2016 | Bernie Sanders; 85.7% | Hillary Clinton; 13.6% | Others / Uncommitted; 0.8% |
| The Castleton Polling Institute Margin of error: ± 3.27; Sample size: 895 | February 3–17, 2016 | Bernie Sanders; 83.1% | Hillary Clinton; 9.0% | Others / Undecided 7.9% |
| Public Policy Polling Margin of error: ± 3.7; Sample size: 500 | February 14–16, 2016 | Bernie Sanders; 86% | Hillary Clinton; 10% | |
| Castleton University Margin of error: ± 4% Sample size: 617 | August 24 – September 14, 2015 | Bernie Sanders; 65% | Hillary Clinton; 14% | Others 10%, Not sure 11% |
| Castleton University Margin of error: ± 3.8% Sample size: 653 | October 10, 2014 | Bernie Sanders; 36% | Hillary Clinton; 29% | Neither 29%, Not sure 5%, Refused 1% |

=== Virginia ===
Delegate count: 95 Pledged, 14 Unpledged Winner: Hillary Clinton
Primary date: March 1, 2016

| Poll source | Date | 1st | 2nd | Other |
|---|---|---|---|---|
| Primary results | March 1, 2016 | Hillary Clinton; 64.3% | Bernie Sanders; 35.2% | Other 0.5% |
| SurveyMonkey Margin of error: ? Sample size: 908 | February 22–29, 2016 | Hillary Clinton; 57% | Bernie Sanders; 36% | Others / Undecided; 7% |
| YouGov/CBS News Margin of error: 9.2% Sample size: 471 | February 22–26, 2016 | Hillary Clinton; 59% | Bernie Sanders; 39% | Others / Undecided; 2% |
| Monmouth Margin of error: ± 5.6% Sample size: 302 | February 22–24, 2016 | Hillary Clinton; 60% | Bernie Sanders; 33% | Others / Undecided; 7% |
| Roanoke College Margin of error: ± 4.8% Sample size: 415 | February 16–24, 2016 | Hillary Clinton; 50% | Bernie Sanders; 33% | Others / Undecided; 17% |
| Public Policy Polling Margin of error: ± 4.4; Sample size: 500 | February 14–16, 2016 | Hillary Clinton; 56% | Bernie Sanders; 34% | |
| Christopher Newport University Margin of error: ± 4.3% Sample size: 735 | February 3–14, 2016 | Hillary Clinton; 52% | Bernie Sanders; 40% | Others / Undecided; 8% |

Polls in 2015

| Poll source | Date | 1st | 2nd | 3rd | Other |
|---|---|---|---|---|---|
| University of Mary Washington Registered voters: Margin of error: ± 3.9% Sample size: 357; Likely voters: Margin of error: ± 4.3% Sample size: 276 | November 4–9, 2015 | Hillary Clinton; 58% (RV); 63% (LV) | Bernie Sanders; 32% (RV); 27% (LV) | Martin O'Malley; 4% (RV); 5% (LV) | Don't know/None/Refused/Wouldn't vote in that primary 7% (RV); 5% (LV) |
| Christopher Newport University Margin of error: ± 5.1% Sample size: 407 | September 29 –October 8, 2015 | Hillary Clinton; 40% | Bernie Sanders; 23% | Joe Biden; 23% | Jim Webb 5%, Martin O'Malley 2%, Lincoln Chafee <1%, Someone Else 1%, Undecided/Don't Know/Refused 5% |
| Public Policy Polling Margin of error: ± 4.9% Sample size: 409 | July 13–15, 2015 | Hillary Clinton; 64% | Bernie Sanders; 14% | Jim Webb; 8% | Lincoln Chafee 5%, Martin O'Malley 2%, Not sure 7% |
| Christopher Newport University Margin of error: ± ? Sample size: ? | April 13–24, 2015 | Hillary Clinton; 80% | Jim Webb; 6% | Joe Biden; 5% | Bernie Sanders 2%, Martin O'Malley 1%, Lincoln Chafee<1%, Someone else 2%, Undecided 3% |
| Christopher Newport University Margin of error: ± ? Sample size: ? | January 30 – February 10, 2015 | Hillary Clinton; 65% | Jim Webb; 10% | Joe Biden; 8% | Elizabeth Warren 8%, Deval Patrick 2%, Bernie Sanders 2%, Andrew Cuomo 1%, Martin O'Malley 1%, Someone else 1%, Undecided 2% |

Polls in 2014

| Poll source | Date | 1st | 2nd | 3rd | Other |
|---|---|---|---|---|---|
| Christopher Newport University Margin of error: ± 5% Sample size: 391 | February 23–28, 2014 | Hillary Clinton; 66% | Joe Biden; 19% | Elizabeth Warren; 7% | Undecided 9% |

Polls in 2013

| Poll source | Date | 1st | 2nd | 3rd | Other |
|---|---|---|---|---|---|
| University of Mary Washington Margin of error: ±? Sample size: ? | September 25–29, 2013 | Hillary Clinton; 34% | Mark Warner; 16% | Joe Biden; 9% | Elizabeth Warren 3%, Andrew Cuomo 2%, Martin O'Malley 1%, None 12%, Don't know 17% |
| Public Policy Polling Margin of error: ±5.2% Sample size: 357 | July 11–14, 2013 | Hillary Clinton; 51% | Joe Biden; 14% | Mark Warner; 11% | Elizabeth Warren 6%, Cory Booker 4%, Martin O'Malley 3%, Andrew Cuomo 2%, Brian Schweitzer 1%, Kirsten Gillibrand 0%, Someone else/Undecided 8% |
| Public Policy Polling Margin of error: ± 4.8% Sample size: 421 | May 24–26, 2013 | Hillary Clinton; 56% | Joe Biden; 14% | Mark Warner; 11% | Andrew Cuomo 3%, Elizabeth Warren 3%, Kirsten Gillibrand 1%, Martin O'Malley 1%, Deval Patrick 0%, Brian Schweitzer 0%, Someone else/Undecided 10% |
| University of Mary Washington Margin of error: ±? Sample size: ? | March 20–24, 2013 | Hillary Clinton; 38% | Mark Warner; 18% | Joe Biden; 10% | Andrew Cuomo 3%, Martin O'Malley 3%, Other 1%, None 12%, Don't know 12% |

=== Washington ===
Delegate count: 101 Pledged, 17 Unpledged Winner: Bernie Sanders
Caucus date: March 26, 2016

| Poll source | Date | 1st | 2nd | 3rd | Other |
|---|---|---|---|---|---|
| Caucus results | March 29, 2016 | Bernie Sanders; 72.72% | Hillary Clinton; 27.10% | | Other; 0.18% |
| Gravis Marketing Margin of error: ± 6% Sample size: 256 | May 18–19, 2015 | Hillary Clinton; 35% | Elizabeth Warren; 26% | Bernie Sanders; 19% | Joe Biden 4%, Martin O'Malley 3%, Jim Webb 1%, Unsure 12% |
| Gravis Marketing Margin of error: ± 6% Sample size: 256 | May 18–19, 2015 | Hillary Clinton; 45% | Bernie Sanders; 36% | Lincoln Chafee; 2% | Bill De Blasio 2%, Martin O'Malley 2%, Jim Webb 1%, Unsure 12% |
| Public Policy Polling Margin of error: ± 5% Sample size: 391 | May 14–17, 2015 | Hillary Clinton; 57% | Bernie Sanders; 24% | Martin O'Malley; 4% | Jim Webb 2%, Lincoln Chafee 1%, Not sure 12% |

=== West Virginia ===
Delegate count: 29 Pledged, 8 Unpledged Winner: Bernie Sanders
Primary date: May 10, 2016

| Poll source | Date | 1st | 2nd | 3rd | Other |
|---|---|---|---|---|---|
| Primary results | May 10, 2016 | Bernie Sanders; 51.4% | Hillary Clinton; 35.8% | Paul Farrell; 8.9% | Others; 3.9% |
| MetroNews Margin of error: ±4.0% Sample size: 315 | April 22-May 2, 2016 | Bernie Sanders; 47% | Hillary Clinton; 43% | | Undecided 11% |
| Public Policy Polling Margin of error: ±3.9% Sample size: 637 | April 29-May 1, 2016 | Bernie Sanders; 45% | Hillary Clinton; 37% | | Undecided 18% |
| West Virginia Veterans/Thirty-Ninth Street Strategies Margin of error: ±3.9% Sample size: 600 | March 2–6, 2016 | Hillary Clinton; 44% | Bernie Sanders; 31% | Paul Farrell; 6% | Keith Judd 1% Others 7% Undecided 11% |
| Orion Strategies Margin of error: ±5.6% Sample size: 306 | February 20–21, 2016 | Bernie Sanders; 32% | Hillary Clinton; 24% | | Undecided 44% |
| REPASS Research Margin of error: ±4.9% Sample size: 411 | February 11–16, 2016 | Bernie Sanders; 57% | Hillary Clinton; 29% | | |
| Orion Strategies Margin of error: ±4.9% Sample size: 306 | August 27, 2015 | Hillary Clinton; 23% | Joe Biden; 16% | Bernie Sanders; 12% | Undecided 49% |
| Prism Surveys Margin of error: ± 3.21% Sample size: 900 | August 21, 2015 | Hillary Clinton; 36% | Bernie Sanders; 32% | | Undecided 32% |

=== Wisconsin ===
Delegate count: 86 Pledged, 10 Unpledged Winner: Bernie Sanders
Primary date: April 5, 2016

| Poll source | Date | 1st | 2nd | 3rd | Other |
|---|---|---|---|---|---|
| Official Primary results | April 5, 2016 | Bernie Sanders; 56.6% | Hillary Clinton; 43.1% | | Others / Uncommitted; 0.4% |
| ARG Margin of error: ± 5.0% Sample size: 400 | April 1–3, 2016 | Hillary Clinton; 49% | Bernie Sanders; 48% | | Others / Undecided; 3% |
| Emerson Margin of error: ± 4.2% Sample size: 542 | March 30 – April 3, 2016 | Bernie Sanders; 51% | Hillary Clinton; 43% | | Others / Undecided; 6% |
| CBS News/YouGov Margin of error: ± 3.7% Sample size: 653 | March 29 – April 1, 2016 | Bernie Sanders; 49% | Hillary Clinton; 47% | | Others / Undecided; 4% |
| FOX Business Margin of error: ± 3.0% Sample size: 860 | March 28–30, 2016 | Bernie Sanders; 48% | Hillary Clinton; 43% | | Others / Undecided; 10% |
| Loras College Margin of error: ± 4.8% Sample size: 416 | March 28–29, 2016 | Hillary Clinton; 47% | Bernie Sanders; 41% | | Others / Undecided; 12% |
| Public Policy Polling Margin of error: ± 3.7% Sample size: 720 | March 28–29, 2016 | Bernie Sanders; 49% | Hillary Clinton; 43% | | Others / Undecided; 8% |
| MULaw Poll Margin of error: ± 6.3% Sample size: 405 | March 24–28, 2016 | Bernie Sanders; 49% | Hillary Clinton; 45% | | Others / Undecided; 6% |
| Emerson College Margin of error: ± 4.6% Sample size: 439 | March 20–22, 2016 | Hillary Clinton; 50% | Bernie Sanders; 44% | | Others / Undecided; 6% |
| MULaw Poll Margin of error: ± 6.9% Sample size: 343 | February 18–21, 2016 | Bernie Sanders; 44% | Hillary Clinton; 43% | | Others / Undecided; 13% |
| MULaw Poll Margin of error: ± 6.5% Sample size: 312 | January 21–24, 2016 | Hillary Clinton; 45% | Bernie Sanders; 43% | Martin O'Malley; 1% | Not Reported |

Polls in 2015

| Poll source | Date | 1st | 2nd | 3rd | Other |
|---|---|---|---|---|---|
| Marquette Law School Margin of error: ± 6.1% Sample size: 374 | November 12–15, 2015 | Hillary Clinton; 50% | Bernie Sanders; 41% | Martin O'Malley; 2% | Undecided 7% |
| St. Norbert College Margin of error: ± 6% Sample size: ? | October 14–17, 2015 | Hillary Clinton; 35% | Bernie Sanders; 33% | Joe Biden; 21% | Martin O'Malley 1%, Lincoln Chafee 0%, Jim Webb 0%, Not Sure 10% |
| St. Norbert College Margin of error: ± 6% Sample size: ? | October 14–17, 2015 | Hillary Clinton; 47% | Bernie Sanders; 42% | – | Martin O'Malley 1%, Lincoln Chafee 1%, Jim Webb <1%, Not Sure 7% |
| Marquette University Margin of error: ± 5.9% Sample size: 394 | September 24–28, 2015 | Hillary Clinton; 42% | Bernie Sanders; 30% | Joe Biden; 17% | Martin O'Malley 1%, Lincoln Chafee 0%, Jim Webb 0% |
| Marquette University Margin of error: ± 6.1% Sample size: 396 | August 13–16, 2015 | Hillary Clinton; 44% | Bernie Sanders; 32% | Joe Biden; 12% | Lincoln Chafee 1%, Martin O'Malley 1%, Jim Webb 1% |
| Marquette University Margin of error: ± 5.1% Sample size: 391 | April 7–10, 2015 | Hillary Clinton; 58.2% | Elizabeth Warren; 14.3% | Joe Biden; 12% | Martin O'Malley 0.9%, Jim Webb 0.9%, Someone else 3.7%, Don't know 8.9% |
| Public Policy Polling Margin of error: ± 4.4% Sample size: 504 | March 6–8, 2015 | Hillary Clinton; 60% | Joe Biden; 14% | Elizabeth Warren; 12% | Bernie Sanders 5%, Martin O'Malley 1%, Jim Webb 1%, Other/Undecided 7% |

Polls in 2014

| Poll source | Date | 1st | 2nd | 3rd | Other |
|---|---|---|---|---|---|
| Public Policy Polling Margin of error: ± 4.1% Sample size: 579 | April 17–20, 2014 | Hillary Clinton; 57% | Russ Feingold; 19% | Joe Biden; 8% | Elizabeth Warren 5%, Cory Booker 1%, Andrew Cuomo 1%, Mark Warner 1%, Kirsten Gillibrand 0%, Martin O'Malley 0%, Someone else/Not sure 8% |

Polls in 2013

| Poll source | Date | 1st | 2nd | 3rd | Other |
|---|---|---|---|---|---|
| Marquette University Margin of error: ± 5% Sample size: 392 | October 21–27, 2013 | Hillary Clinton; 64% | Elizabeth Warren; 10.8% | Joe Biden; 10.6% | Andrew Cuomo 1.9%, Martin O'Malley 0.8%, Someone else 2.1%, Don't know 9.2% |
| Public Policy Polling Margin of error: ± 4.6% Sample size: 449 | September 13–16, 2013 | Hillary Clinton; 50% | Russ Feingold; 20% | Joe Biden; 11% | Elizabeth Warren 4%, Cory Booker 3%, Andrew Cuomo 2%, Kirsten Gillibrand 0%, Martin O'Malley 0%, Mark Warner 0%, Someone else/Not sure 9% |
| Marquette University Margin of error: ± 5.5% Sample size: 333 | May 6–9, 2013 | Hillary Clinton; 61.5% | Joe Biden; 13% | Elizabeth Warren; 4.8% | Andrew Cuomo 4.2%, Deval Patrick 1.5%, Martin O'Malley 1.1%, Mark Warner 0.7%, Someone else 1.5%, Don't Know 11% |
| Public Policy Polling Margin of error: Sample size: | February 21–24, 2013 | Hillary Clinton; 50% | Russ Feingold; 25% | Joe Biden; 11% | Andrew Cuomo 3%, Elizabeth Warren 2%, Martin O'Malley 1%, Deval Patrick 1%, Brian Schweitzer 0%, Mark Warner 0%, Someone Else/Undecided 8% |

=== Wyoming ===
Delegate count: 14 Pledged, 4 Unpledged Winner: Bernie Sanders
Caucus date: April 9, 2016

| Poll source | Date | 1st | 2nd |
|---|---|---|---|
| Caucus results | March 5, 2016 | Bernie Sanders; 55.7% | Hillary Clinton; 44.3% |

No polls were conducted for the Wyoming Democratic caucuses.

== District/territories ==
=== American Samoa ===
Delegate count: 6 Pledged, 5 Unpledged Winner: Hillary Clinton
Primary date: March 1, 2016

| Poll source | Date | 1st | 2nd | Other |
|---|---|---|---|---|
| Caucus results | March 1, 2016 | Hillary Clinton; 68.4% | Bernie Sanders; 25.7% | Other; 6.0% |

=== District of Columbia ===
Delegate count: 20 Pledged, 26 Unpledged Winner: Hillary Clinton
Primary date: June 14, 2016

| Poll source | Date | 1st | 2nd | Other |
|---|---|---|---|---|
| Primary results | June 14, 2016 | Hillary Clinton; 78.7% | Bernie Sanders; 21.1% | Other; 0.2% |

=== Guam ===
Delegate count: 7 Pledged, 5 Unpledged Winner: Hillary Clinton
Primary date: May 7, 2016

| Poll source | Date | 1st | 2nd | Other |
|---|---|---|---|---|
| Caucus results | May 7, 2016 | Hillary Clinton; 59.5% | Bernie Sanders; 40.5% | |

=== Northern Marianas ===
Delegate count: 6 Pledged, 5 Unpledged Winner: Hillary Clinton
Primary date: March 1, 2016

| Poll source | Date | 1st | 2nd | Other |
|---|---|---|---|---|
| Caucus results | March 12, 2016 | Hillary Clinton; 54.0% | Bernie Sanders; 34.4% | Other; 11.6% |

=== Puerto Rico ===
Delegate count: 60 Pledged, 7 Unpledged Winner: Hillary Clinton
Primary date: June 5, 2016

| Poll source | Date | 1st | 2nd | Other |
|---|---|---|---|---|
| Primary results | June 5, 2016 | Hillary Clinton; 60.0% | Bernie Sanders; 38.0% | Others 2.0% |
| Pasquines Polls Margin of error: ±% Sample size: 249 | May 23–30, 2016 | Hillary Clinton; 64% | Bernie Sanders; 30% | Others / Undecided; 6% |

=== Virgin Islands ===
Delegate count: 7 Pledged, 5 Unpledged Winner: Hillary Clinton
Caucus date: June 4, 2016

| Poll source | Date | 1st | 2nd | Other |
|---|---|---|---|---|
| Caucus results | June 4, 2016 | Hillary Clinton; 84.2% | Bernie Sanders; 12.2% | |

== See also ==
General election polling

- Nationwide opinion polling for the United States presidential election, 2016
- Nationwide opinion polling for the United States presidential election by demographics, 2016
- Statewide opinion polling for the United States presidential election, 2016

Democratic primary polling

- Nationwide opinion polling for the Democratic Party 2016 presidential primaries

Republican primary polling

- Nationwide opinion polling for the Republican Party 2016 presidential primaries
- Statewide opinion polling for the Republican Party presidential primaries, 2016
