= Opinion polling for the 2016 United States presidential election in Florida =

This page lists statewide public opinion polls that have been conducted relating to the 2016 United States presidential election in Florida, contested by Hillary Clinton (Democratic Party), Donald Trump (Republican Party), Gary Johnson (Libertarian Party) and Jill Stein (Green Party). The state was won by Donald Trump with 49.02% of the vote against 47.82% for Hillary Clinton.

== September–November ==
Poll source	Date administered	Hillary Clinton	Donald Trump	Lead margin	Sample size	Margin of error
Quinnipiac University	November 3–6, 2016	46%	46%	Tied	884	± 3.3%
CNN/ORC	October 27 – November 1, 2016	50%	49%	1	773	± 3.5%
Quinnipiac University	October 27 – November 1, 2016	47%	45%	2	626	± 3.9%
Gravis Marketing/One America News Network	October 31, 2016	51%	49%	2	1,995	± 2.2%
New York Times Upshot/Siena College	October 25–27, 2016	45%	48%	3	814	± 3.4%
NBC News/Wall Street Journal/Marist	October 25–26, 2016	46%	46%	Tied	779	± 3.5%
University of North Florida	October 20–25, 2016	46%	44%	2	836	± 3.4%
Bloomberg/Selzer	October 21–24, 2016	45%	46%	1	953	± 3.2%
Quinnipiac University	October 10–16, 2016	49%	45%	4	660	± 3.8%
Public Policy Polling	October 12–13, 2016	49%	44%	5	985	± 3.1%
Ipsos/Reuters	October 5–12, 2016	42%	40%	2	1,532	± 2.9%
NBC News/Wall Street Journal/Marist	October 3–5, 2016	46%	44%	2	700	± 3.7%
University of North Florida	September 27 – October 4, 2016	47%	40%	7	696	± 3.8%
Quinnipiac University	September 27 – October 2, 2016	49%	44%	5	545	± 4.2%
Public Policy Polling	September 27–28, 2016	48%	45%	3	826	± 3.4%
Florida Chamber Political Institute	September 15–20, 2016	45%	42%	3	617	± 4.0%
New York Times Upshot/Siena College	September 10–14, 2016	43%	43%	Tied	867	± 3.3%
CNN/ORC	September 7–12, 2016	46%	50%	4	788	± 3.5%
Public Policy Polling	September 4–6, 2016	47%	46%	1	744	± 3.6%

Three-way race

Poll source	Date administered	Hillary Clinton	Donald Trump	Gary Johnson	Lead margin	Sample size	Margin of error
Remington Research Group/Axiom Strategies	November 1–2, 2016	45%	48%	2%	3	2,352	± 2.02%
Remington Research/Axiom Strategies	October 23–30, 2016	44%	48%	2%	4	989	± 3.11%
Remington Research Group/Axiom Strategies	October 20–22, 2016	46%	46%	2%	Tied	1,646	± 2.41%
Florida Chamber Political Institute	September 15–20, 2016	43%	41%	8%	2	617	± 4.0%

Four-way race

Poll source	Date administered	Hillary Clinton	Donald Trump	Gary Johnson	Jill Stein	Lead margin	Sample size	Margin of error
Trafalgar Group	November 6, 2016	46%	50%	2%	1%	4	1,100	± 2.89%
Quinnipiac University	November 3–6, 2016	46%	45%	2%	1%	1	884	± 3.3%
CBS News/YouGov	November 2–4, 2016	45%	45%	4%	2%	Tied	1,188	± 3.6%
Fox 13/Fox 35/Opinion Savvy	November 1–2, 2016	49%	45%	3%	1%	4	603	± 4.0%
CNN/ORC	October 27 – November 1, 2016	49%	47%	3%	1%	2	773	± 3.5%
Quinnipiac University	October 27 – November 1, 2016	46%	45%	2%	2%	1	626	± 3.9%
Gravis Marketing/One America News Network	October 31, 2016	49%	46%	2%	1%	3	1,995	± 2.2%
Trafalgar Group	October 27–31, 2016	45%	49%	2%	1%	4	1,150	± 2.9%
TargetSmart/William & Mary	October 25–30, 2016	48%	40%	3%	2%	8	718	N/A
Emerson College	October 26–27, 2016	46%	45%	4%	0%	1	500	± 4.3%
New York Times Upshot/Siena College	October 25–27, 2016	42%	46%	4%	2%	4	814	± 3.4%
NBC News/Wall Street Journal/Marist	October 25–26, 2016	45%	44%	5%	2%	1	779	± 3.5%
Saint Leo University	October 22–26, 2016	50%	37%	5%	1%	13	1,028	± 3.0%
University of North Florida	October 20–25, 2016	43%	39%	6%	3%	4	836	± 3.4%
Bloomberg/Selzer	October 21–24, 2016	43%	45%	4%	2%	2	953	± 3.2%
SurveyUSA/Bay News 9/News 13	October 20–24, 2016	48%	45%	2%	1%	3	1,251	± 2.8%
Florida Atlantic University	October 21–23, 2016	46%	43%	3%	2%	3	500	± 4.3%
CBS News/YouGov	October 20–21, 2016	46%	43%	3%	2%	3	1,042	± 3.6%
Opinion Savvy/Fox 13/Fox 35	October 20, 2016	49%	45%	3%	2%	4	538	± 4.2%
Florida Chamber Political Institute	October 16–19, 2016	46%	42%	5%	1%	4	507	± 4.4%
Quinnipiac University	October 10–16, 2016	48%	44%	4%	1%	4	660	± 3.8%
Public Policy Polling	October 12–13, 2016	46%	42%	5%	1%	4	985	± 3.1%
Ipsos/Reuters	October 5–12, 2016	42%	38%	6%	2%	4	1,532	± 2.9%
Opinion Savvy	October 10–11, 2016	47%	44%	5%	1%	3	533	± 4.2%
Florida Atlantic University	October 5–9, 2016	49%	43%	1%	0%	6	400	± 4.9%
NBC News/Wall Street Journal/Marist	October 3–5, 2016	45%	42%	5%	3%	3	700	± 3.7%
Emerson College	October 2–4, 2016	44%	45%	4%	3%	1	600	± 3.90%
University of North Florida	September 27 – October 4, 2016	41%	38%	6%	3%	3	696	± 3.8%
Quinnipiac University	September 27 – October 2, 2016	46%	41%	5%	2%	5	545	± 4.2%
Opinion Savvy/Fox 13/Fox 35	September 28–29, 2016	47%	46%	4%	2%	1	619	± 4.0%
Mason-Dixon	September 27–29, 2016	46%	42%	7%	1%	4	820	± 3.5%
Public Policy Polling	September 27–28, 2016	45%	43%	3%	1%	2	826	± 3.4%
Suffolk University	September 19–21, 2016	44%	45%	3%	1%	1	500	± 4.4%
Monmouth University	September 16–19, 2016	46%	41%	6%	1%	5	400	± 4.9%
Saint Leo University	September 10–16, 2016	49%	44%	6%	2%	5	502	± 4.5%
New York Times Upshot/Siena College	September 10–14, 2016	41%	40%	9%	2%	1	867	± 3.3%
CNN/ORC	September 7–12, 2016	44%	47%	6%	1%	3	788	± 3.5%
CBS News/YouGov	September 7–9, 2016	44%	42%	5%	2%	2	1,193	± 3.5%
JMC Analytics	September 7–8, 2016	42%	46%	3%	1%	4	781	± 3.5%
Public Policy Polling	September 4–6, 2016	43%	44%	5%	1%	1	744	± 3.6%

== January–August 2016 ==
Poll source	Date administered	Hillary Clinton	Donald Trump	Lead margin	Sample size	Margin of error
Quinnipiac University	August 27 – September 7, 2016	47%	47%	Tied	761	± 3.6%
Florida Chamber Political Institute	August 17–22, 2016	43%	44%	1	608	± 4.0%
NBC News/Wall Street Journal/Marist	August 4–10, 2016	44%	39%	5	862	± 3.3%
Public Policy Polling	August 5–7, 2016	46%	43%	3	938	± 3.2%
Quinnipiac University	July 30 – August 7, 2016	46%	45%	1	1,056	± 3.0%
Suffolk University	August 1–3, 2016	48%	42%	6	500	± 4.4%
NBC News/Wall Street Journal/Marist	July 5–11, 2016	44%	37%	7	871	± 3.3%
Quinnipiac University	June 30 – July 11, 2016	39%	42%	3	1,015	± 3.1%
Gravis Marketing/One America News Network	June 27–28, 2016	45%	49%	4	1,619	± 2.4%
OnMessage	June 26–28, 2016	45%	47%	2	800	± 3.46%
Greenberg Quinlan Rosner	June 11–20, 2016	52%	39%	13	300	± 5.66%
Quinnipiac University	June 8–19, 2016	47%	39%	8	975	± 3.1%
Quinnipiac University	June 8–19, 2016	45%	39%	6	975	± 3.1%
Public Policy Polling	June 2–5, 2016	44%	45%	1	737	± 3.6%
Public Policy Polling	June 2–5, 2016	46%	43%	3	737	± 3.6%
CBS News/YouGov	May 16–19, 2016	43%	42%	1	995	± 4%
CBS News/YouGov	May 16–19, 2016	44%	44%	Tied	995	± 4%
Gravis Marketing	May 17–18, 2016	46%	42%	4	2,542	± 2%
Quinnipiac University	April 27 – May 8, 2016	43%	42%	1	1,051	± 3.0%
Quinnipiac University	April 27 – May 8, 2016	44%	42%	2	1,051	± 3.0%
Associated Industries of Florida	April 25–27, 2016	49%	36%	13	604	± 5%
Associated Industries of Florida	April 25–27, 2016	48%	39%	9	604	± 5%
NBC News/Wall Street Journal/Marist	March 4–10, 2016	49%	41%	8	2,422	± 2.0%
NBC News/Wall Street Journal/Marist	March 4–10, 2016	48%	43%	5	2,422	± 2.0%
NBC News/Wall Street Journal/Marist	March 4–10, 2016	47%	46%	1	2,422	± 2.0%
NBC News/Wall Street Journal/Marist	March 4–10, 2016	50%	42%	8	2,422	± 2.0%
NBC News/Wall Street Journal/Marist	March 4–10, 2016	48%	41%	7	2,422	± 2.0%
CNN/ORC	March 2–6, 2016	50%	43%	7	854	3.5%
CNN/ORC	March 2–6, 2016	44%	48%	4	854	3.5%
CNN/ORC	March 2–6, 2016	46%	47%	1	854	3.5%
SurveyUSA/Bay News 9/News 13	March 4–6, 2016	44%	45%	1	1961	2.3%
SurveyUSA/Bay News 9/News 13	March 4–6, 2016	46%	44%	2	1961	2.3%
SurveyUSA/Bay News 9/News 13	March 4–6, 2016	45%	44%	1	1961	2.3%
Public Policy Polling	February 24–25, 2016	44%	46%	2	1012	3.1%
Public Policy Polling	February 24–25, 2016	47%	39%	8	1012	3.1%
Public Policy Polling	February 24–25, 2016	45%	43%	2	1012	3.1%
Public Policy Polling	February 24–25, 2016	44%	47%	3	1012	3.1%
Public Policy Polling	February 24–25, 2016	46%	39%	7	1012	3.1%
Public Policy Polling	February 24–25, 2016	44%	42%	2	1012	3.1%
Florida Southern College Center	January 30 – February 6, 2016	44.56%	37.56%	7	608	4%
Florida Southern College Center	January 30 – February 6, 2016	42.67%	45.17%	2.5	608	4%
Florida Southern College Center	January 30 – February 6, 2016	44.9%	41.69%	3.21	608	4%
Florida Southern College Center	January 30 – February 6, 2016	41.68%	44.97%	3.29	608	4%
Florida Southern College Center	January 30 – February 6, 2016	47.99%	38.78%	9.21	608	4%
Florida Southern College Center	January 30 – February 6, 2016	44.27%	43%	1.27	608	4%
Florida Southern College Center	January 30 – February 6, 2016	46.07%	36.73%	9.34	608	4%
Florida Southern College Center	January 30 – February 6, 2016	45.21%	40.77%	4.44	608	4%
Florida Atlantic University	January 15–18, 2016	42%	45%	3	1008	3.0%
Florida Atlantic University	January 15–18, 2016	44%	47%	3	1008	3.0%
Florida Atlantic University	January 15–18, 2016	42%	47%	5	1008	3.0%
Florida Atlantic University	January 15–18, 2016	46%	46%	Tied	1008	3.0%
Florida Atlantic University	January 15–18, 2016	42%	47%	5	1008	3.0%
Florida Atlantic University	January 15–18, 2016	47%	42%	5	1008	3.0%
Florida Atlantic University	January 15–18, 2016	43%	43%	Tied	1008	3.0%

Three-way race

Poll source	Date administered	Hillary Clinton	Donald Trump	Gary Johnson	Lead margin	Sample size	Margin of error
Florida Chamber Political Institute	August 17–22, 2016	41%	44%	9%	3	608	± 4.0%
Greenberg Quinlan Rosner	July 6–10, 2016	45%	40%	6%	5	1,000	± 4.1%
Greenberg Quinlan Rosner	June 11–20, 2016	49%	38%	9%	11	300	± 5.66%
Mason-Dixon	May 31 – June 2, 2016	45%	42%	6%	3	625	± 4%
Mason-Dixon	May 31 – June 2, 2016	42%	42%	8%	Tied	625	± 4%
Mason-Dixon	May 31 – June 2, 2016	50%	40%	6%	10	625	± 4%

Four-way race

Poll source	Date administered	Hillary Clinton	Donald Trump	Gary Johnson	Jill Stein	Lead margin	Sample size	Margin of error
Quinnipiac University	August 29 – September 7, 2016	43%	43%	8%	2%	Tied	761	± 3.6%
Mason-Dixon	August 22–24, 2016	44%	42%	6%	2%	2	625	± 4.0%
ICITIZEN	August 18–24, 2016	42%	37%	8%	2%	5	600	± 4.0%
Florida Atlantic University	August 19–22, 2016	41%	43%	8%	2%	2	1,200	± 3.0%
Saint Leo University Polling Institute	August 14–18, 2016	52%	38%	8%	2%	14	1,380	± 3.0%
Monmouth University	August 12–15, 2016	48%	39%	6%	1%	9	402	± 4.9%
CBS News/YouGov	August 10–12, 2016	45%	40%	5%	2%	5	1,194	± 3.6%
Fox 13 Tampa Bay/Opinion Savvy	August 10, 2016	45%	44%	6%	1%	1	622	± 4.0%
NBC News/Wall Street Journal/Marist	August 4–10, 2016	41%	36%	9%	4%	5	862	± 3.3%
Quinnipiac University	July 30 – August 7, 2016	43%	43%	7%	3%	Tied	1,056	± 3.0%
Suffolk University	August 1–3, 2016	43%	39%	4%	3%	4	500	± 4.4%
NBC News/Wall Street Journal/Marist	July 5–11, 2016	41%	36%	7%	4%	5	871	± 3.3%
Quinnipiac University	June 30 – July 11, 2016	36%	41%	7%	4%	5	1,015	± 3.1%
JMC Analytics	July 9–10, 2016	42%	47%	2%	1%	5	700	± 3.7%
SurveyUSA/Bay News 9/News 13	June 25–27, 2016	46%	42%	2%	1%	4	1,873	± 2.4%
CBS News/YouGov	June 21–24, 2016	44%	41%	3%	1%	3	1,192	± 3.6%
Quinnipiac University	June 8–19, 2016	42%	36%	7%	3%	6	975	± 3.1%
Public Policy Polling	June 2–5, 2016	40%	41%	4%	2%	1	737	± 3.6%
Public Policy Polling	June 2–5, 2016	40%	40%	5%	1%	Tied	737	± 3.6%

== 2013–2015 ==
Poll source	Date administered	Democrat	%	Republican	%	Lead margin	Sample size	Margin of error
Quinnipiac University	September 25 – October 5, 2015	Joe Biden	46%	Jeb Bush	42%	4	1173	2.9%
Quinnipiac University	September 25 – October 5, 2015	Joe Biden	45%	Ben Carson	42%	3	1173	2.9%
Quinnipiac University	September 25 – October 5, 2015	Joe Biden	49%	Carly Fiorna	38%	11	1173	2.9%
Quinnipiac University	September 25 – October 5, 2015	Joe Biden	46%	Marco Rubio	43%	3	1173	2.9%
Quinnipiac University	September 25 – October 5, 2015	Joe Biden	52%	Donald Trump	38%	14	1173	2.9%
Quinnipiac University	September 25 – October 5, 2015	Hillary Clinton	43%	Jeb Bush	44%	1	1173	2.9%
Quinnipiac University	September 25 – October 5, 2015	Hillary Clinton	45%	Ben Carson	43%	2	1173	2.9%
Quinnipiac University	September 25 – October 5, 2015	Hillary Clinton	44%	Carly Fiorna	42%	2	1173	2.9%
Quinnipiac University	September 25 – October 5, 2015	Hillary Clinton	44%	Marco Rubio	45%	1	1173	2.9%
Quinnipiac University	September 25 – October 5, 2015	Hillary Clinton	46%	Donald Trump	41%	5	1173	2.9%
Quinnipiac University	September 25 – October 5, 2015	Bernie Sanders	41%	Jeb Bush	45%	4	1173	2.9%
Quinnipiac University	September 25 – October 5, 2015	Bernie Sanders	40%	Ben Carson	46%	6	1173	2.9%
Quinnipiac University	September 25 – October 5, 2015	Bernie Sanders	41%	Carly Fiorna	42%	1	1173	2.9%
Quinnipiac University	September 25 – October 5, 2015	Bernie Sanders	41%	Marco Rubio	46%	5	1173	2.9%
Quinnipiac University	September 25 – October 5, 2015	Bernie Sanders	46%	Donald Trump	41%	5	1173	2.9%
Public Policy Polling	September 11–13, 2015	Hillary Clinton	42%	Jeb Bush	45%	3	814	3.4%
Public Policy Polling	September 11–13, 2015	Hillary Clinton	40%	Ben Carson	49%	9	814	3.4%
Public Policy Polling	September 11–13, 2015	Hillary Clinton	45%	Ted Cruz	43%	2	814	3.4%
Public Policy Polling	September 11–13, 2015	Hillary Clinton	41%	Carly Fiorina	46%	5	814	3.4%
Public Policy Polling	September 11–13, 2015	Hillary Clinton	45%	Mike Huckabee	43%	2	814	3.4%
Public Policy Polling	September 11–13, 2015	Hillary Clinton	41%	John Kasich	44%	3	814	3.4%
Public Policy Polling	September 11–13, 2015	Hillary Clinton	43%	Marco Rubio	48%	5	814	3.4%
Public Policy Polling	September 11–13, 2015	Hillary Clinton	42%	Donald Trump	48%	6	814	3.4%
Public Policy Polling	September 11–13, 2015	Hillary Clinton	43%	Scott Walker	45%	2	814	3.4%
Public Policy Polling	September 11–13, 2015	Bernie Sanders	41%	Jeb Bush	45%	4	814	3.4%
Public Policy Polling	September 11–13, 2015	Bernie Sanders	33%	Ben Carson	48%	15	814	3.4%
Public Policy Polling	September 11–13, 2015	Bernie Sanders	37%	Carly Fiorina	44%	7	814	3.4%
Public Policy Polling	September 11–13, 2015	Bernie Sanders	41%	Donald Trump	47%	6	814	3.4%
Public Policy Polling	September 11–13, 2015	Bernie Sanders	40%	Scott Walker	42%	2	814	3.4%
Public Policy Polling	September 11–13, 2015	Joe Biden	42%	Jeb Bush	45%	3	814	3.4%
Public Policy Polling	September 11–13, 2015	Joe Biden	43%	Donald Trump	47%	4	814	3.4%
Quinnipiac University	August 7–18, 2015	Hillary Clinton	41%	Donald Trump	43%	2	1,093	± 3%
Quinnipiac University	August 7–18, 2015	Hillary Clinton	38%	Jeb Bush	49%	11	1,093	± 3%
Quinnipiac University	August 7–18, 2015	Hillary Clinton	39%	Marco Rubio	51%	12	1,093	± 3%
Quinnipiac University	August 7–18, 2015	Joe Biden	45%	Donald Trump	42%	3	1,093	± 3%
Quinnipiac University	August 7–18, 2015	Joe Biden	38%	Jeb Bush	51%	13	1,093	± 3%
Quinnipiac University	August 7–18, 2015	Joe Biden	42%	Marco Rubio	48%	6	1,093	± 3%
Quinnipiac University	August 7–18, 2015	Bernie Sanders	41%	Donald Trump	45%	4	1,093	± 3%
Quinnipiac University	August 7–18, 2015	Bernie Sanders	35%	Jeb Bush	54%	19	1,093	± 3%
Quinnipiac University	August 7–18, 2015	Bernie Sanders	36%	Marco Rubio	52%	16	1,093	± 3%
Quinnipiac University	June 4–15, 2015	Hillary Clinton	46%	Jeb Bush	42%	4	1,147	± 3%
Quinnipiac University	June 4–15, 2015	Hillary Clinton	46%	Chris Christie	35%	11	1,147	± 3%
Quinnipiac University	June 4–15, 2015	Hillary Clinton	48%	Ted Cruz	37%	11	1,147	± 3%
Quinnipiac University	June 4–15, 2015	Hillary Clinton	49%	Mike Huckabee	38%	11	1,147	± 3%
Quinnipiac University	June 4–15, 2015	Hillary Clinton	48%	John Kasich	35%	13	1,147	± 3%
Quinnipiac University	June 4–15, 2015	Hillary Clinton	46%	Rand Paul	39%	7	1,147	± 3%
Quinnipiac University	June 4–15, 2015	Hillary Clinton	47%	Marco Rubio	44%	3	1,147	± 3%
Quinnipiac University	June 4–15, 2015	Hillary Clinton	48%	Scott Walker	38%	10	1,147	± 3%
Mason-Dixon	April 14–16, 2015	Hillary Clinton	43%	Jeb Bush	47%	4	625	± 4%
Mason-Dixon	April 14–16, 2015	Hillary Clinton	43%	Marco Rubio	49%	6	625	± 4%
Quinnipiac University	March 17–28, 2015	Hillary Clinton	42%	Jeb Bush	45%	3	1,087	± 3%
Quinnipiac University	March 17–28, 2015	Hillary Clinton	44%	Chris Christie	39%	5	1,087	± 3%
Quinnipiac University	March 17–28, 2015	Hillary Clinton	48%	Ted Cruz	39%	9	1,087	± 3%
Quinnipiac University	March 17–28, 2015	Hillary Clinton	48%	Mike Huckabee	40%	8	1,087	± 3%
Quinnipiac University	March 17–28, 2015	Hillary Clinton	46%	Rand Paul	43%	3	1,087	± 3%
Quinnipiac University	March 17–28, 2015	Hillary Clinton	46%	Marco Rubio	44%	2	1,087	± 3%
Quinnipiac University	March 17–28, 2015	Hillary Clinton	46%	Scott Walker	40%	6	1,087	± 3%
Public Policy Polling	March 19–22, 2015	Hillary Clinton	47%	Jeb Bush	44%	3	923	± 3.2%
Public Policy Polling	March 19–22, 2015	Hillary Clinton	49%	Ben Carson	41%	8	923	± 3.2%
Public Policy Polling	March 19–22, 2015	Hillary Clinton	48%	Chris Christie	41%	7	923	± 3.2%
Public Policy Polling	March 19–22, 2015	Hillary Clinton	49%	Ted Cruz	42%	7	923	± 3.2%
Public Policy Polling	March 19–22, 2015	Hillary Clinton	49%	Mike Huckabee	44%	5	923	± 3.2%
Public Policy Polling	March 19–22, 2015	Hillary Clinton	46%	Rand Paul	42%	4	923	± 3.2%
Public Policy Polling	March 19–22, 2015	Hillary Clinton	50%	Rick Perry	42%	8	923	± 3.2%
Public Policy Polling	March 19–22, 2015	Hillary Clinton	48%	Marco Rubio	46%	2	923	± 3.2%
Public Policy Polling	March 19–22, 2015	Hillary Clinton	49%	Scott Walker	41%	8	923	± 3.2%
Public Policy Polling	March 19–22, 2015	Joe Biden	43%	Scott Walker	43%	Tied	923	± 3.2%
Public Policy Polling	March 19–22, 2015	Elizabeth Warren	42%	Scott Walker	41%	1	923	± 3.2%
Quinnipiac University	January 22 – February 1, 2015	Hillary Clinton	44%	Jeb Bush	43%	1	936	± 3.2%
Quinnipiac University	January 22 – February 1, 2015	Hillary Clinton	51%	Chris Christie	33%	18	936	± 3.2%
Quinnipiac University	January 22 – February 1, 2015	Hillary Clinton	51%	Mike Huckabee	34%	17	936	± 3.2%
Quinnipiac University	January 22 – February 1, 2015	Hillary Clinton	50%	Rand Paul	38%	12	936	± 3.2%
Quinnipiac University	January 22 – February 1, 2015	Hillary Clinton	49%	Marco Rubio	39%	10	936	± 3.2%
Gravis Marketing	October 22–24, 2014	Hillary Clinton	45%	Jeb Bush	46%	1	861	± 3%
Gravis Marketing	October 22–24, 2014	Hillary Clinton	46%	Marco Rubio	39%	7	861	± 3%
Gravis Marketing	October 11–12, 2014	Hillary Clinton	37%	Jeb Bush	36%	1	1,023	± 3%
Gravis Marketing	October 11–12, 2014	Hillary Clinton	43%	Marco Rubio	35%	8	1,023	± 3%
Public Policy Polling	September 4–7, 2014	Hillary Clinton	46%	Jeb Bush	44%	2	818	± 3.4%
Public Policy Polling	September 4–7, 2014	Hillary Clinton	46%	Chris Christie	38%	8	818	± 3.4%
Public Policy Polling	September 4–7, 2014	Hillary Clinton	51%	Ted Cruz	36%	15	818	± 3.4%
Public Policy Polling	September 4–7, 2014	Hillary Clinton	49%	Mike Huckabee	40%	9	818	± 3.4%
Public Policy Polling	September 4–7, 2014	Hillary Clinton	48%	Rand Paul	40%	8	818	± 3.4%
Public Policy Polling	September 4–7, 2014	Hillary Clinton	49%	Marco Rubio	42%	7	818	± 3.4%
Gravis Marketing	August 14–24, 2014	Hillary Clinton	39%	Jeb Bush	37%	2	859	± 4%
Gravis Marketing	August 14–24, 2014	Hillary Clinton	44%	Marco Rubio	35%	9	859	± 4%
SurveyUSA	August 15–18, 2014	Hillary Clinton	48%	Mitt Romney	41%	7	852	± 3.4%
SurveyUSA	August 15–18, 2014	Joe Biden	39%	Mitt Romney	47%	8	852	± 3.4%
SurveyUSA	July 31 – August 1, 2014	Hillary Clinton	50%	Rick Perry	40%	10	859	± 3.4%
SurveyUSA	July 31 – August 1, 2014	Joe Biden	43%	Rick Perry	44%	1	859	± 3.4%
Quinnipiac University	July 17–21, 2014	Hillary Clinton	49%	Jeb Bush	42%	7	1,251	± 2.8%
Quinnipiac University	July 17–21, 2014	Hillary Clinton	54%	Chris Christie	33%	21	1,251	± 2.8%
Quinnipiac University	July 17–21, 2014	Hillary Clinton	53%	Rand Paul	37%	16	1,251	± 2.8%
Quinnipiac University	July 17–21, 2014	Hillary Clinton	53%	Marco Rubio	39%	14	1,251	± 2.8%
Quinnipiac University	July 17–21, 2014	Hillary Clinton	51%	Paul Ryan	38%	13	1,251	± 2.8%
SurveyUSA	July 17–21, 2014	Hillary Clinton	47%	Jeb Bush	41%	6	836	± 3.5%
SurveyUSA	July 17–21, 2014	Hillary Clinton	49%	Chris Christie	38%	11	836	± 3.5%
SurveyUSA	July 17–21, 2014	Hillary Clinton	46%	Rand Paul	42%	4	836	± 3.5%
SurveyUSA	July 17–21, 2014	Hillary Clinton	53%	Marco Rubio	39%	14	836	± 3.5%
SurveyUSA	July 17–21, 2014	Joe Biden	38%	Jeb Bush	47%	9	836	± 3.5%
SurveyUSA	July 17–21, 2014	Joe Biden	39%	Chris Christie	48%	9	836	± 3.5%
SurveyUSA	July 17–21, 2014	Joe Biden	39%	Rand Paul	47%	8	836	± 3.5%
SurveyUSA	July 17–21, 2014	Joe Biden	43%	Marco Rubio	46%	3	836	± 3.5%
SurveyUSA	June 30 – July 2, 2014	Hillary Clinton	46%	Rand Paul	42%	4	849	± 3.4%
SurveyUSA	June 30 – July 2, 2014	Joe Biden	39%	Rand Paul	47%	8	849	± 3.4%
SurveyUSA	June 20–23, 2014	Hillary Clinton	53%	Marco Rubio	39%	14	834	± 3.5%
SurveyUSA	June 20–23, 2014	Joe Biden	43%	Marco Rubio	46%	3	834	± 3.5%
SurveyUSA	June 5–10, 2014	Hillary Clinton	47%	Jeb Bush	41%	6	850	± 3.4%
SurveyUSA	June 5–10, 2014	Joe Biden	38%	Jeb Bush	47%	9	850	± 3.4%
Public Policy Polling	June 6–9, 2014	Hillary Clinton	46%	Jeb Bush	45%	1	672	± 3.8%
Public Policy Polling	June 6–9, 2014	Hillary Clinton	46%	Chris Christie	38%	8	672	± 3.8%
Public Policy Polling	June 6–9, 2014	Hillary Clinton	50%	Ted Cruz	39%	11	672	± 3.8%
Public Policy Polling	June 6–9, 2014	Hillary Clinton	48%	Mike Huckabee	41%	7	672	± 3.8%
Public Policy Polling	June 6–9, 2014	Hillary Clinton	48%	Rand Paul	42%	6	672	± 3.8%
Public Policy Polling	June 6–9, 2014	Hillary Clinton	48%	Marco Rubio	44%	4	672	± 3.8%
Saint Leo University	May 28 – June 4, 2014	Hillary Clinton	44%	Jeb Bush	46%	2	500	± 5%
Saint Leo University	May 28 – June 4, 2014	Hillary Clinton	47%	Chris Christie	40%	7	500	± 5%
Saint Leo University	May 28 – June 4, 2014	Hillary Clinton	52%	Ted Cruz	36%	16	500	± 5%
Saint Leo University	May 28 – June 4, 2014	Hillary Clinton	50%	Paul Ryan	40%	10	500	± 5%
Saint Leo University	May 28 – June 4, 2014	Hillary Clinton	50%	Rand Paul	38%	12	500	± 5%
Saint Leo University	May 28 – June 4, 2014	Hillary Clinton	49%	Marco Rubio	41%	8	500	± 5%
Quinnipiac University	April 23–28, 2014	Hillary Clinton	49%	Jeb Bush	41%	8	1,413	± 2.6%
Quinnipiac University	April 23–28, 2014	Hillary Clinton	52%	Chris Christie	34%	18	1,413	± 2.6%
Quinnipiac University	April 23–28, 2014	Hillary Clinton	57%	Ted Cruz	31%	26	1,413	± 2.6%
Quinnipiac University	April 23–28, 2014	Hillary Clinton	53%	Mike Huckabee	35%	18	1,413	± 2.6%
Quinnipiac University	April 23–28, 2014	Hillary Clinton	55%	Rand Paul	37%	18	1,413	± 2.6%
Quinnipiac University	April 23–28, 2014	Hillary Clinton	52%	Marco Rubio	40%	12	1,413	± 2.6%
Quinnipiac University	April 23–28, 2014	Hillary Clinton	56%	Paul Ryan	36%	20	1,413	± 2.6%
Quinnipiac University	January 22–27, 2014	Hillary Clinton	49%	Jeb Bush	43%	6	1,565	± 2.5%
Quinnipiac University	January 22–27, 2014	Hillary Clinton	51%	Chris Christie	35%	16	1,565	± 2.5%
Quinnipiac University	January 22–27, 2014	Hillary Clinton	54%	Ted Cruz	34%	20	1,565	± 2.5%
Quinnipiac University	January 22–27, 2014	Hillary Clinton	53%	Rand Paul	38%	15	1,565	± 2.5%
Quinnipiac University	January 22–27, 2014	Hillary Clinton	51%	Marco Rubio	41%	10	1,565	± 2.5%
Quinnipiac University	January 22–27, 2014	Hillary Clinton	52%	Paul Ryan	39%	13	1,565	± 2.5%
Quinnipiac University	November 12–17, 2013	Hillary Clinton	47%	Jeb Bush	45%	2	1,646	± 2.4%
Quinnipiac University	November 12–17, 2013	Hillary Clinton	45%	Chris Christie	41%	4	1,646	± 2.4%
Quinnipiac University	November 12–17, 2013	Hillary Clinton	52%	Ted Cruz	36%	16	1,646	± 2.4%
Quinnipiac University	November 12–17, 2013	Hillary Clinton	51%	Rand Paul	41%	10	1,646	± 2.4%
Quinnipiac University	November 12–17, 2013	Hillary Clinton	50%	Marco Rubio	43%	7	1,646	± 2.4%
Quinnipiac University	November 12–17, 2013	Hillary Clinton	50%	Paul Ryan	42%	8	1,646	± 2.4%
Gravis Marketing	November 8–10, 2013	Hillary Clinton	49%	Marco Rubio	45%	4	932	± 3%
Quinnipiac University	June 11–16, 2013	Hillary Clinton	50%	Jeb Bush	43%	7	1,176	± 2.9%
Quinnipiac University	June 11–16, 2013	Hillary Clinton	53%	Marco Rubio	41%	12	1,176	± 2.9%
Quinnipiac University	June 11–16, 2013	Joe Biden	43%	Jeb Bush	47%	4	1,176	± 2.9%
Quinnipiac University	June 11–16, 2013	Joe Biden	43%	Marco Rubio	45%	2	1,176	± 2.9%
Public Policy Polling	March 15–18, 2013	Hillary Clinton	53%	Jeb Bush	40%	13	500	± 4.4%
Public Policy Polling	March 15–18, 2013	Hillary Clinton	56%	Marco Rubio	40%	16	500	± 4.4%
Public Policy Polling	March 15–18, 2013	Hillary Clinton	54%	Paul Ryan	41%	13	500	± 4.4%
Quinnipiac University	March 13–18, 2013	Hillary Clinton	51%	Jeb Bush	40%	11	1,000	± 3.1%
Quinnipiac University	March 13–18, 2013	Hillary Clinton	52%	Marco Rubio	41%	11	1,000	± 3.1%
Public Policy Polling	January 11–13, 2013	Hillary Clinton	49%	Jeb Bush	44%	5	501	± 4.4%
Public Policy Polling	January 11–13, 2013	Hillary Clinton	50%	Marco Rubio	46%	4	501	± 4.4%

Three-way race

Poll source	Date administered	Democrat	%	Republican	%	Independent/ Third-party candidate	%	Lead margin	Sample size	Margin of error
Public Policy Polling	September 11–13, 2015	Hillary Clinton	39%	Jeb Bush	29%	Donald Trump	27%	10	814	3.4%
Quinnipiac University	August 7–18, 2015	Hillary Clinton	37%	Jeb Bush	36%	Donald Trump	19%	1	1093	3%

== See also ==
General election polling

- Nationwide opinion polling for the 2016 United States presidential election
  - Nationwide opinion polling for the 2016 United States presidential election by demographic
- Statewide opinion polling for the 2016 United States presidential election
  - January–August 2016 statewide opinion polling for the 2016 United States presidential election
  - Pre-2016 statewide opinion polling for the 2016 United States presidential election
- International opinion polling for the 2016 United States presidential election

Democratic primary polling

- Nationwide opinion polling for the 2016 Democratic Party presidential primaries
- Statewide opinion polling for the 2016 Democratic Party presidential primaries

Republican primary polling

- Nationwide opinion polling for the 2016 Republican Party presidential primaries
- Statewide opinion polling for the 2016 Republican Party presidential primaries
