= International opinion polling for the 2008 United States presidential election =

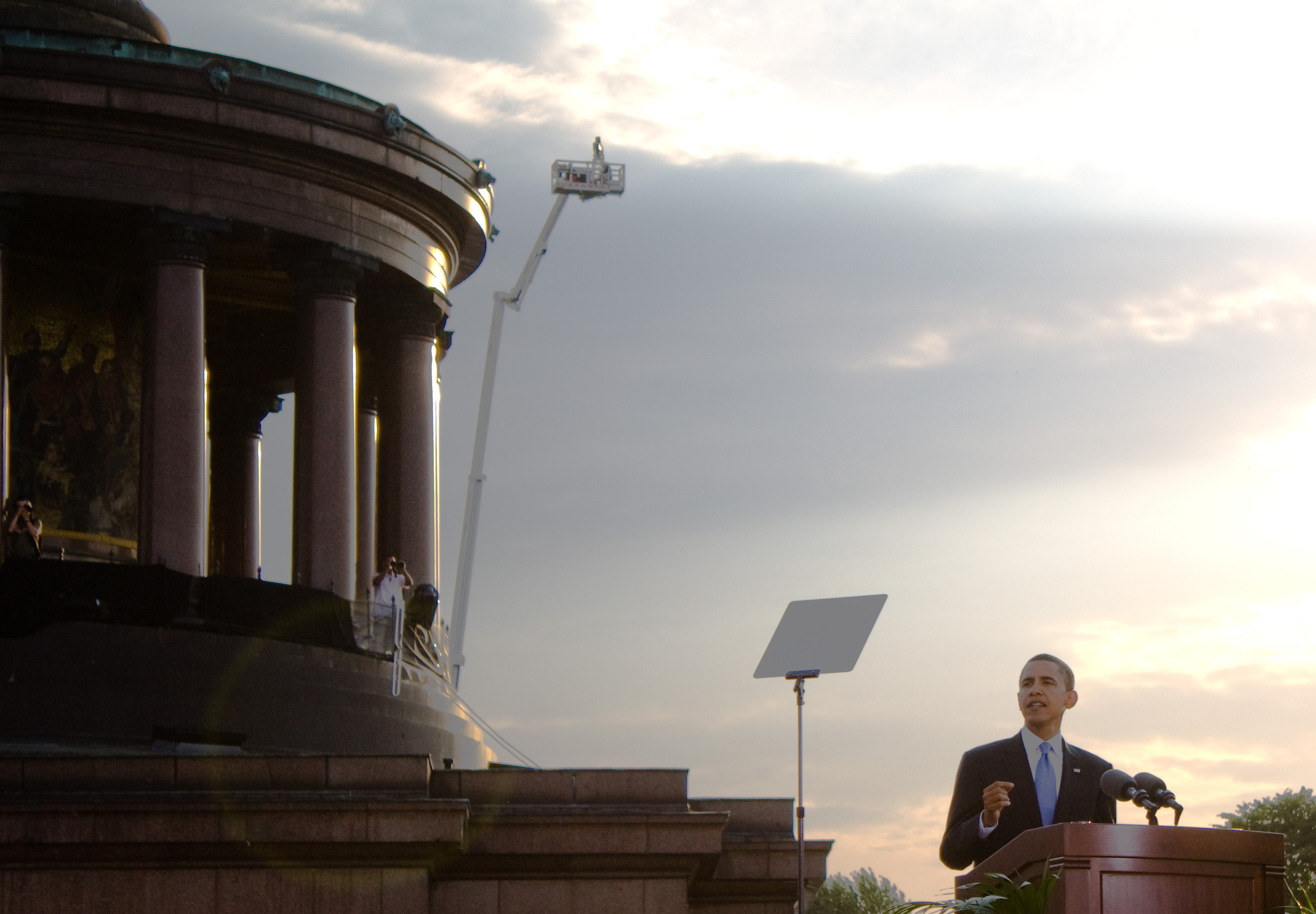
Barack Obama speaking in July 2008 in Berlin. Some polls showed that more than 70% of Germans supported his candidacy.

This article lists international opinion polls taken in various countries around the world during 2008 relating to the 2008 United States presidential election. Most polls measured foreign preference for Democratic candidate Barack Obama and Republican candidate John McCain. For international reaction to the election, see International reaction to the United States presidential election, 2008.

== Summary ==
Most polls during the 2008 election year showed greater global support for Senator Barack Obama over Senator John McCain. A poll for the BBC World Service conducted in 22 countries found Obama favored in each one by varying margins, with an overall average of 49% preference for Obama, 12% for McCain, and 40% with no preference. Similarly, a 73 country Gallup poll found that 24% of those polled favored Obama compared with 7% who favored McCain; 69% of those surveyed had no opinion. An international Reader's Digest survey also reported more support for Obama than McCain in all 16 foreign countries polled, though not in the U.S. itself. However, certain countries did prefer McCain to Obama in some polls, including Israel, Georgia, Laos by a small margin, and the Philippines (which is in contrast to the capital Manila).

A poll done by the Pew Global Attitudes Project investigated whether other countries believed American foreign policy "will change for the better" with a new president. Although majorities held this belief in several major European and African countries, 67% of Japanese respondents said it would not change very much and more Jordanians and Egyptians believed American foreign policy would get worse than better. In terms of confidence in the candidates, the Pew poll found most but not all countries had more confidence in Obama to do the right thing in global affairs. In several countries a majority of those polled said they were following the campaign closely, including Australia, Germany, Jordan, and the United Kingdom.

A global non-scientific Internet vote conducted by The Economist, with 52,000 respondents, indicated that Obama was favored over McCain by a vast majority of poll respondents, with over 44,000 votes for Obama, or roughly 85% (there were no third party or abstain options).

== Multi-country polls ==
Country	Candidates	YouGov/ Daily Telegraph May 27–29	Reader's Digest/ Synovate Omnibus June 2-July 7	BBC/ GlobeScan July 28-Aug 27	Gallup May-Oct	Harris/ France24/IHT Oct 1-13	Various Oct
Argentina	Obama; McCain	-	-	-	31% 6%	-	-
Armenia	Obama; McCain	-	-	-	43% 10%	-	-
Australia	Obama; McCain	-	76% 10%	67% 13%	64% 14%	-	-
Austria	Obama; McCain	-	-	-	58% 10%	-	-
Bangladesh	Obama; McCain	-	-	-	19% 8%	-	-
Belgium	Obama; McCain	-	-	-	64% 6%	-	62% 8%
Benin	Obama; McCain	-	-	-	20% 2%	-	-
Bolivia	Obama; McCain	-	-	-	30% 8%	-	-
Botswana	Obama; McCain	-	-	-	62% 6%	-	-
Brazil	Obama; McCain	-	78% 11%	51% 8%	-	-	-
Burkina Faso	Obama; McCain	-	-	-	50% 7%	-	-
Burundi	Obama; McCain	-	-	-	61% 8%	-	-
Cambodia	Obama; McCain	-	-	-	4% 9%	-	-
Cameroon	Obama; McCain	-	-	-	44% 7%	-	-
Canada	Obama; McCain	-	64% 14%	66% 14%	67% 22%	-	70% 14%
Chile	Obama; McCain	-	-	-	43% 9%	-	-
China	Obama; McCain	-	-	35% 15%	12% 5%	-	-
Colombia	Obama; McCain	-	-	-	38% 16%	-	-
Costa Rica	Obama; McCain	-	-	-	44% 9%	-	-
Denmark	Obama; McCain	-	-	-	69% 8%	-	-
Egypt	Obama; McCain	-	-	26% 13%	-	-	-
El Salvador	Obama; McCain	-	-	-	24% 14%	-	-
Estonia	Obama; McCain	-	-	-	22% 17%	-	-
Ethiopia	Obama; McCain	-	-	-	76% 6%	-	-
Finland	Obama; McCain	-	71% 13%	-	54% 14%	-	-
France	Obama; McCain	65% 8%	75% 10%	69% 6%	64% 4%	78% 1%	68% 5%
Georgia	Obama; McCain	-	-	-	15% 23%	-	-
Germany	Obama; McCain	67% 6%	61% 26%	65% 7%	62% 10%	72% 5%	-
Ghana	Obama; McCain	-	-	-	31% 13%	-	-
Guatemala	Obama; McCain	-	-	-	27% 11%	-	-
Honduras	Obama; McCain	-	-	-	27% 9%	-	-
India	Obama; McCain	-	85% 7%	24% 15%	7% 2%	-	-
Indonesia	Obama; McCain	-	67% 17%	46% 11%	-	-	-
Ireland	Obama; McCain	-	-	-	67% 19%	-	-
Italy	Obama; McCain	70% 15%	-	76% 12%	56% 6%	66% 12%	-
Japan	Obama; McCain	-	-	-	66% 15%	-	61% 13%
Kenya	Obama; McCain	-	-	87% 5%	89% 3%	-	-
Kuwait (nationals for Gallup)	Obama; McCain	-	-	-	32% 12%	-	-
Laos	Obama; McCain	-	-	-	24% 25%	-	-
Latvia	Obama; McCain	-	-	-	23% 15%	-	-
Lebanon	Obama; McCain	-	-	39% 27%	45% 18%	-	-
Liberia	Obama; McCain	-	-	-	45% 27%	-	-
Lithuania	Obama; McCain	-	-	-	13% 13%	-	-
Madagascar	Obama; McCain	-	-	-	47% 28%	-	-
Mali	Obama; McCain	-	-	-	70% 16%	-	-
Mauritania	Obama; McCain	-	-	-	68% 3%	-	-
Mexico	Obama; McCain	-	70% 25%	54% 16%	27% 9%	-	46% 13%
Netherlands	Obama; McCain	-	92% 8%	-	74% 10%	-	-
Nicaragua	Obama; McCain	-	-	-	23% 7%	-	-
Nigeria	Obama; McCain	-	-	66% 11%	23% 11%	-	-
Norway	Obama; McCain	-	-	-	71% 13%	-	-
Pakistan	Obama; McCain	-	-	-	5% 5%	-	-
Palestine	Obama; McCain	-	-	-	33% 11%	-	-
Panama	Obama; McCain	-	-	43% 15%	35% 10%	-	-
Paraguay	Obama; McCain	-	-	-	26% 11%	-	-
Peru	Obama; McCain	-	-	-	31% 11%	-	-
Philippines	Obama; McCain	-	-	46% 22%	20% 28%	-	-
Poland	Obama; McCain	-	65% 19%	38% 13%	43% 24%	-	43% 26%
Russia	Obama; McCain	31% 24%	52% 17%	18% 7%	-	-	-
Rwanda	Obama; McCain	-	-	-	57% 12%	-	-
Saudi Arabia	Obama; McCain	-	-	-	50% 19%	-	-
Senegal	Obama; McCain	-	-	-	54% 15%	-	-
Sierra Leone	Obama; McCain	-	-	-	68% 18%	-	-
Singapore	Obama; McCain	-	-	29% 7%	21% 11%	-	-
South Africa	Obama; McCain	-	70% 26%	-	-	-	-
South Korea	Obama; McCain	-	-	-	50% 24%	-	-
Spain	Obama; McCain	-	76% 13%	-	49% 6%	68% 8%	-
Sweden	Obama; McCain	-	-	-	64% 6%	-	-
Switzerland	Obama; McCain	-	-	-	-	-	83% 7%
Taiwan	Obama; McCain	-	81% 6%	-	-	-	-
Tanzania	Obama; McCain	-	-	-	76% 9%	-	-
Togo	Obama; McCain	-	-	-	38% 6%	-	-
Turkey	Obama; McCain	-	-	26% 11%	22% 8%	-	-
UAE	Obama; McCain	-	-	46% 13%	-	-	-
Uganda	Obama; McCain	-	-	-	85% 8%	-	-
United Kingdom	Obama; McCain	49% 14%	70% 14%	59% 9%	60% 15%	48% 11%	64% 15%
Uruguay	Obama; McCain	-	-	-	39% 7%	-	-
Zambia	Obama; McCain	-	-	-	47% 12%	-	-
Zimbabwe	Obama; McCain	-	-	-	41% 15%	-	-

== Individual country polls ==
=== Argentina ===
A poll taken on August 26 by Ibarómetro reported that 53.2% of those polled preferred Obama against 8.8% for McCain; 38% were unsure.

=== Canada ===
Polls taken in Canada showed widespread and overwhelming support for Obama, even in traditionally conservative parts of the country.

=== France ===
A poll conducted on September 2–3 by TNS Sofres/Logica for the French-American Foundation and Fondation Robert Schuman found that 80% of the French polled hoped for an Obama victory, 8% for a McCain victory, 7% for neither, and 5% without an opinion. A later poll done on October 10–11 by BVA for La Tribune found an even higher 86% who preferred to see Obama elected, with 6% hoping the same for McCain and 8% not expressing an opinion.

The day after the election, a poll conducted by CSA for Le Parisien found that 84% of those polled were satisfied with the election of Obama, while 6% were dissatisfied and 10% expressed no opinion.

=== Germany ===
During the Democratic primary campaign, 43% of Germans supported Obama and 39% supported challenger Senator Hillary Clinton according to a poll by Forsa for Stern. In terms of the general election, a Forsa poll carried out on August 20–21 found 74% of respondents would vote for Obama, 11% for McCain, and 15% other or not sure.

=== Israel ===
The Rabin Center for Israel Studies commissioned a poll by TNS Teleseker in the months before the election, which found that 46.4% of those polled supported McCain, 34% supported Obama, and 18.6% were undecided.

=== Palestinian territories ===
A poll by the Palestinian Center for Public Opinion taken September 1–10 reported 33.5% of respondents favoring McCain, 27.7% Obama, 30.4% neither, and 8.3% unsure.

== See also ==
- International opinion polling for the United States presidential election, 2016
