= Nationwide opinion polling for the 2016 United States presidential election by demographic =

This page lists nationwide public opinion polling among demographics that have been conducted relating to the 2016 United States presidential election between prospective Democratic and Republican candidates. The two major party candidates were chosen at the Democratic National Convention and Republican National Convention in July 2016. The general election occurred on Tuesday, November 8, 2016.

== Two-way race ==
=== By race or ethnicity ===
==== African Americans ====
Poll source	Date	Hillary Clinton Democratic	Donald Trump Republican	Undecided	Leading by %	Sample size	Margin of error
Politico/Morning Consult	November 4–5, 2016	80%	11%		69%	1,482 likely voters	± 3.0%
NBC News/Wall Street Journal	November 3–5, 2016	86%	7%		79%	1,282 likely voters	± 2.7%
McClatchy/Marist College	November 1–3, 2016	86%	7%		79%	940 likely voters	±3.2%
American Research Group	October 17–20, 2016	88%	4%	6%	84%	1,006 likely voters	±3.0%
NBC News/Wall Street Journal	October 10–13, 2016	86%	9%		77%	1,000 registered voters	±3.1%
Pew Research	September 27-October 10, 2016	69%	15%		54%	4,132 respondents	±2.8%
American Research Group	September 17–20, 2016	87%	2%	8%	85%	990 registered voters	±3.2%
NBC News/Wall Street Journal	September 16–19, 2016	81%	7%		74%	1,000 registered voters	±3.1%
CBS News/New York Times	September 9–13, 2016	89%	6%		83%	1,753 adults	±3.0%
Morning Consult	September 6–8, 2016	73%	7%		66%	1,961 registered voters	±2.0%
YouGov/The Economist	September 4–6, 2016	82%	11%	5%	71%	1300 adults	±4.4%
USA Today/Suffolk University	August 24–29, 2016	92%	4%		88%	1,000 voters	±3%
Morning Consult	August 24–26, 2016	79%	5%	16%	74%	2,007 registered voters	±2%
USC Dornsife/Los Angeles Times	July 4 – August 4, 2016	80%	14.6%		65.4%		
Culturintel	June 1 – July 1, 2016	52%	26%	22%	26%		
SurveyUSA	September 2–3, 2015	59%	25%	16%	34%	108 African American registered voters	± 3.3%

==== Asian Americans ====
Poll source	Date	Hillary Clinton Democratic	Donald Trump Republican	Other	Undecided	Leading by %	Sample size	Margin of error
National Asian American Survey	August 10–September 29, 2016	59%	16%	10%	16%	43%	2,543	± 3.5%
USC Dornsife/Los Angeles Times	September 2–3, 2015	45.2%	39.8%			5.4%		
SurveyUSA	September 2–3, 2015	39%	41%		20%	2%	63 registered voters	± 3.3%

==== Hispanic Americans ====
Poll source	Date	Hillary Clinton Democratic	Donald Trump Republican	Undecided	Leading by %	Sample size	Margin of error
Politico/Morning Consult	November 4–5, 2016	61%	27%		34%	1,482 likely voters	± 3.0%
NBC News/Wall Street Journal	November 3–5, 2016	65%	20%		45%	1,282 likely voters	± 2.7%
Pew Research	September 27-October 10, 2016	56%	24%		32%	4,132 respondents	±2.8%
Wall Street Journal/NBC News/Telemundo	September 15–20, 2016	63%	16%		47%	300 Hispanic registered voters	±5.66%
YouGov/The Economist	September 4–6, 2016	63%	21%	16%	42%	1,300 adults	±4.4%
Morning Consult	September 1–2, 2016	61%	21%		40%	2,001 registered voters	±2%
USA Today/Suffolk University	August 24–29, 2016	65%	24%		41%	1,000 voters	±3%
USC Dornsife/Los Angeles Times	July 4 – August 4, 2016	59.1%	27.8%		31.3%		
SurveyUSA	September 2–3, 2015	50%	31%	19%	19%	171 Hispanic American registered voters	± 3.3%

==== White Americans ====
Poll source	Date	Hillary Clinton Democratic	Donald Trump Republican	Undecided	Leading by %	Sample size	Margin of error
Bloomberg Politics/Selzer & Co	November 4–6, 2016	38%	50%		12%	799 likely voters	± 3.5%
ABC News/Washington Post	November 3–6, 2016	38%	53%		15%	2,220 likely voters	± 2.5%
Politico/Morning Consult	November 4–5, 2016	39%	49%		10%	1,482 likely voters	± 3.0%
NBC News/Wall Street Journal	November 3–5, 2016	38%	53%		15%	1,282 likely voters	± 2.7%
McClatchy/Marist College	November 1–3, 2016	37%	49%		12%	940 likely voters	± 3.2%
CNN/Opinion Research Corporation	October 20–23, 2016	42%	54%	3%	12%	779 likely voters	±4.0%
American Research Group	October 17–20, 2016	42%	50%	3%	8%	1,006 likely voters	±3.0%
Bloomberg Politics/Selzer & Co	October 14–17, 2016	40%	49%		9%	1,006 likely voters	±3.1%
PRRI/Brookings	October 12–17, 2016	40%	43%		3%	692 likely voters	±4.4%
NBC News/Wall Street Journal	October 10–13, 2016	40%	51%		11%	1,000 registered voters	±3.1%
Pew Research	September 27-October 10, 2016	33%	42%		9%	4,132 respondents	±2.8%
American Research Group	September 17–20, 2016	39%	50%	5%	11%	990 registered voters	±3.2%
McClatchy/Marist College	September 15–20, 2016	37%	53%	2%	16%	1,298 adults	±2.7%
Ipsos/Reuters	September 15–19, 2016	33%	42%	8%	9%	1,098 White American registered voters	±3.4%
NBC News/Wall Street Journal	September 16–18, 2016	41%	49%		8%	1,000 registered voters	±3.1%
Morning Consult	September 6–8, 2016	35%	44%		9%	1,710 likely voters	±2%
ABC News/Washington Post	September 5–8, 2016	36%	50%		14%	1,002 adults	±3.5%
CNN/Opinion Research Corporation	September 1–4, 2016	34%	55%		21%	1,001 adults	±3.5%
Ipsos/Reuters	August 25–29, 2016	35%	44%	7%	9%	1,946 Americans	±2.5%
SurveyUSA	September 2–3, 2015	34%	51%	14%	17%	603 White American registered voters	± 3.3%

==== Non-white/Minority Americans ====
Poll source	Date	Hillary Clinton Democratic	Donald Trump Republican	Undecided	Leading by %	Sample size	Margin of error
Bloomberg Politics/Selzer & Co	November 4–6, 2016	63%	26%		37%	799 likely voters	± 3.5%
CNN/Opinion Research Corporation	October 20–23, 2016	72%	21%		51%	779 likely voters	±8.0%
Bloomberg Politics/Selzer & Co	October 14–17, 2016	74%	21%		53%	1,006 likely voters	±3.1%
PRRI/Brookings	October 12–17, 2016	76%	17%		59%	692 likely voters	±4.4%
NBC News/Wall Street Journal	October 10–13, 2016	76%	16%		60%	1,000 registered voters	±3.1%
Ipsos/Reuters	September 22–26, 2016	67%	17%	6%	50%	345 minority American registered voters	±6.0%

=== By education ===
==== White Americans with a college degree ====
Poll source	Date	Hillary Clinton Democratic	Donald Trump Republican	Leading by %	Sample size	Margin of error
Politico/Morning Consult	November 4–5, 2016	48%	41%	7%	1,482 likely voters	± 3.0%
NBC News/Wall Street Journal	November 3–5, 2016	51%	41%	10%	1,282 likely voters	± 2.7%
McClatchy/Marist College	November 1–3, 2016	50%	40%	10%	940 likely voters	± 3.2%
PRRI/Brookings	October 12–17, 2016	53%	34%	19%	692 likely voters	±4.4%
NBC News/Wall Street Journal	September 16–19, 2016	49%	43%	5%	1,000 registered voters	±3.1%
CBS News/New York Times	September 9–13, 2016	51%	40%	11%	1,753 adults	±3.0%

==== White Americans without a college degree ====
Poll source	Date	Hillary Clinton Democratic	Donald Trump Republican	Leading by %	Sample size	Margin of error
NBC News/Wall Street Journal	November 3–5, 2016	30%	60%	30%	1,282 likely voters	± 2.7%
McClatchy/Marist College	November 1–3, 2016	27%	57%	30%	940 likely voters	± 3.2%
NBC News/Wall Street Journal	September 16–19, 2016	35%	53%	18%	1,000 registered voters	±3.1%
CBS News/New York Times	September 9–13, 2016	32%	58%	26%	1,753 adults	±3.0%

=== By gender ===
==== Male Americans ====
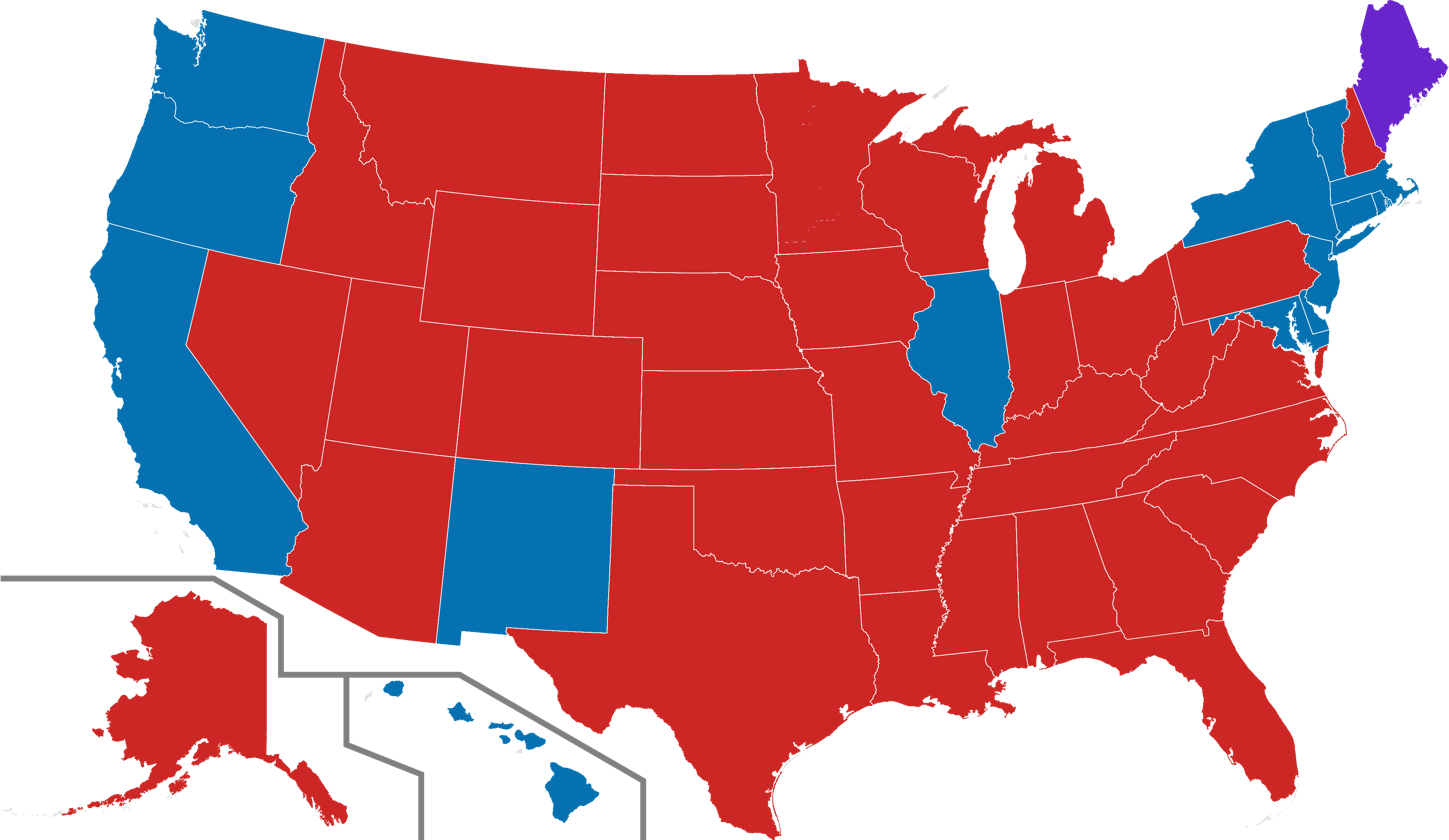
Male voters for Trump

Poll source	Date	Hillary Clinton Democratic	Donald Trump Republican	Leading by %	Sample size	Margin of error
Bloomberg Politics/Selzer & Co	November 4–6, 2016	39%	50%	11%	799 likely voters	± 3.5%
Politico/Morning Consult	November 4–5, 2016	43%	44%	1%	1,482 likely voters	± 3.0%
NBC News/Wall Street Journal	November 3–5, 2016	42%	47%	5%	1,282 likely voters	± 2.7%
McClatchy/Marist College	November 1–3, 2016	38%	50%	12%	940 likely voters	± 3.2%
CNN/Opinion Research Corporation	October 20–23, 2016	46%	49%	3%	779 likely voters	±5.0%
Bloomberg Politics/Selzer & Co	October 14–17, 2016	46%	44%	2%	1,006 likely voters	±3.1%
NBC News/Wall Street Journal	October 10–13, 2016	45%	48%	3%	1,000 registered voters	±3.1%
Pew Research	September 27-October 10, 2016	34%	41%	7%	4,132 respondents	±2.8%
PRRI/The Atlantic	October 5–9, 2016	37%	48%	11%	886 likely voters	
Ipsos/Reuters	September 22–26, 2016	43%	40%	3%	562 registered voters	±4.7%
American Research Group	September 17–20, 2016	38%	55%	17%	990 registered voters	±3.2%
Ipsos/Reuters	September 15–19, 2016	40%	37%	3%	649 registered voters	±4.4%
CBS News/New York Times	September 9–13, 2016	39%	50%	11%	1,753 adults	±3.0%
Quinnipiac University	September 8–13, 2016	41%	50%	9%	960 likely voters	±3.2%
YouGov/The Economist	September 4–6, 2016	43%	44%	1%	1,300 adults	±4.4%
CNN/Opinion Research Corporation	September 1–4, 2016	32%	54%	22%	1,001 adults	±3.5%
Ipsos/Reuters	August 25–29, 2016	42%	40%	2%	1,946 Americans	±2.5%
Quinnipiac University	August 18–24, 2016	42%	48%	6%	1,498 likely voters	±2.5%
ABC News/Washington Post	July 11–14, 2016	41%	49%	8%	816 registered voters	±4.0%

==== Female Americans ====
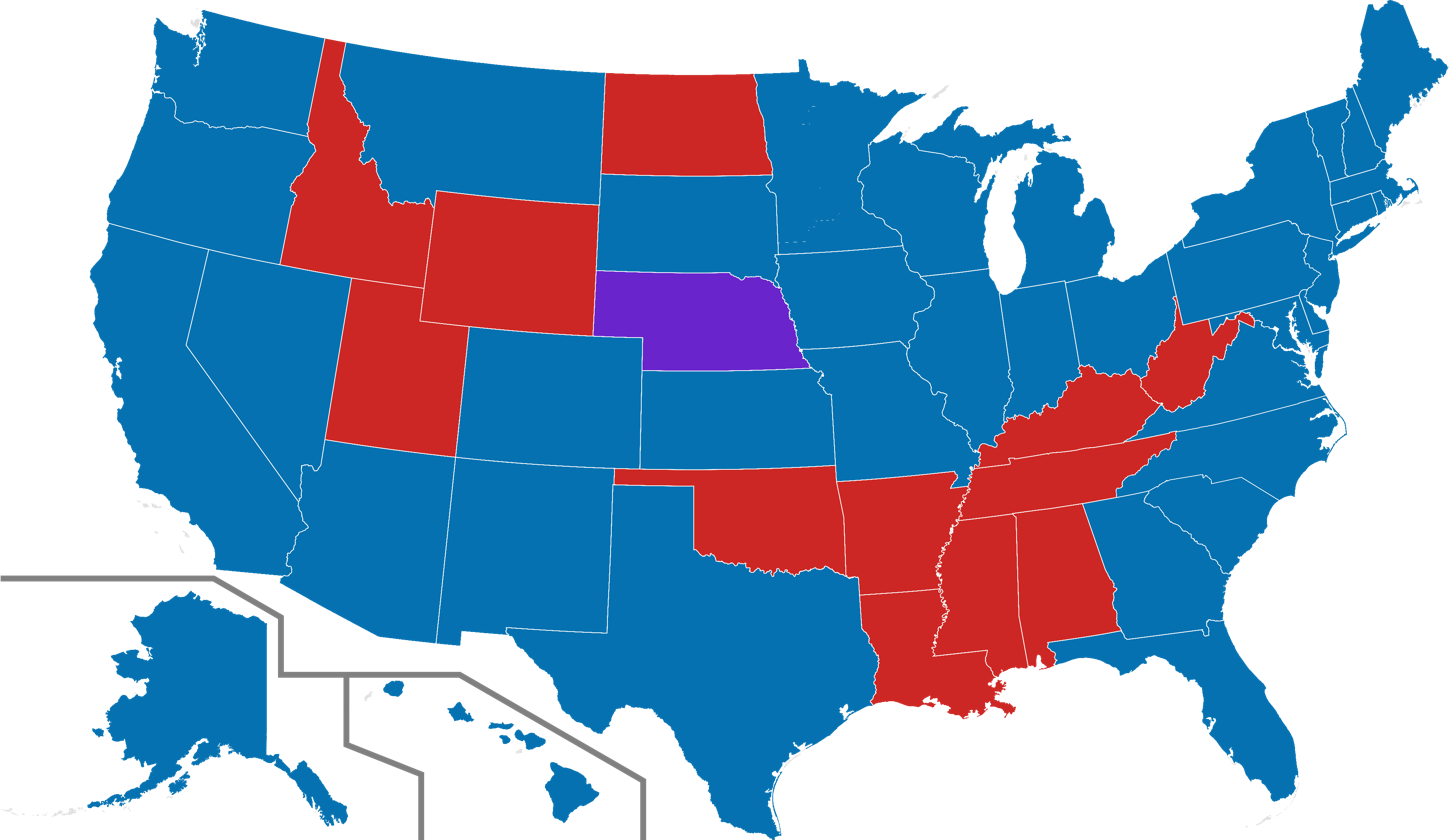
Female voters for Clinton

Poll source	Date	Hillary Clinton Democratic	Donald Trump Republican	Leading by %	Sample size	Margin of error
Bloomberg Politics/Selzer & Co	November 4–6, 2016	51%	36%	15%	799 likely voters	± 3.5%
Politico/Morning Consult	November 4–5, 2016	47%	41%	6%	1,482 likely voters	± 3.0%
NBC News/Wall Street Journal	November 3–5, 2016	53%	38%	15%	1,282 likely voters	± 2.7%
McClatchy/Marist College	November 1–3, 2016	48%	37%	11%	940 likely voters	± 3.2%
CNN/Opinion Research Corporation	October 20–23, 2016	54%	41%	13%	779 likely voters	±5.0%
Bloomberg Politics/Selzer & Co	October 14–17, 2016	55%	38%	17%	1,006 likely voters	±3.1%
NBC News/Wall Street Journal	October 10–13, 2016	55%	35%	20%	1,000 registered voters	±3.1%
Ipsos/Reuters	September 22–26, 2016	45%	32%	13%	849 registered voters	±3.8%
Ipsos/Reuters	September 15–19, 2016	42%	33%	9%	808 registered voters	±3.9%
CBS News/New York Times	September 9–13, 2016	52%	39%	13%	1,753 adults	±3%
Quinnipiac University	September 8–13, 2016	54%	36%	18%	960 likely voters	±3.2%
Morning Consult	September 6–8, 2016	41%	36%	5%	1,710 likely voters	±2%
YouGov/The Economist	September 4–6, 2016	45%	40%	5%	1,300 adults	±4.4%
CNN/Opinion Research Corporation	September 1–4, 2016	53%	38%	15%	1,001 adults	±3.5%
Ipsos/Reuters	August 25–29, 2016	40%	35%	5%	1,946 Americans	±2.5%
USA Today/Suffolk University	August 24–29, 2016	54%	38%	16%	1,000 voters	±3%
Morning Consult	August 24–26, 2016	44%	35%	9%	2,007 registered voters	±2%
The McClatchy Company/Marist College	July 5–9, 2016	51%	33%	18%	1,249 American adults	±3.0%

=== Other criteria ===
==== Independent voters ====
Poll source	Date	Hillary Clinton Democratic	Donald Trump Republican	Leading by %	Sample size	Margin of error
Bloomberg Politics/Selzer & Co	November 4–6, 2016	38%	44%	6%	799 likely voters	± 3.5%
Bloomberg Politics/Purple Insights	October 28–31, 2016	39%	35%	4%	601 likely voters who identify as independent	± 4.0%
CNN/Opinion Research Corporation	October 20–23, 2016	43%	48%	5%	779 likely voters	±6.0%
NBC News/Wall Street Journal	October 10–13, 2016	36%	41%	5%	1,000 registered voters	±3.1%
Emerson College	September 11–13, 2016	36%	41%	5%	600 likely voters	±3.9%
CBS News/New York Times	September 9–13, 2016	39%	42%	4%	1,753 adults	±3.0%
Quinnipiac University	September 8–13, 2016	40%	45%	5%	960 likely voters	±3.2%
Morning Consult	September 6–8, 2016	26%	35%	9%	1,710 likely voters	±2%
ABC News/Washington Post	September 5–8, 2016	39%	37%	2%	1,002 adults	±3.5%
CNN/Opinion Research Corporation	September 1–4, 2016	29%	49%	20%	1,001 adults	±3.5%
Public Policy Polling	August 26–28, 2016	41%	45%	4%	881 likely voters	±3.3%
Monmouth University	August 25–28, 2016	37%	32%	5%	802 registered voters	±3.5%
NBC News/SurveyMonkey	August 22–28, 2016	37%	33%	4%	24,104 adults	±1.0%

==== LGBT Americans ====
Poll source	Date	Hillary Clinton Democratic	Donald Trump Republican	Leading by %	Sample size	Margin of error
Whitman Insight Strategies	March 29 – April 2, 2016	84%	16%	68%	338 LGBT likely voters	± 5.3%

==== Young Americans ====
Poll source	Date	Hillary Clinton Democratic	Donald Trump Republican	Leading by %	Sample size	Margin of error
Harvard University Institute of Politics	October 7–17, 2016	59%	25%	34%	1,054 18 to 29 year old American likely voters	±3.11%

==== Americans with household incomes of $100,000 or more ====
Poll source	Date	Hillary Clinton Democratic	Donald Trump Republican	Leading by %	Sample size	Margin of error
Bloomberg Politics/Purple Insights	September 16–19, 2016	46%	42%	4%	600 likely voters with household incomes of $100,000 or more	±4.0%

== Three-way race ==
=== Independent voters ===
Poll source	Date	Hillary Clinton Democratic	Donald Trump Republican	Gary Johnson Libertarian	Sample size	Margin of error
Public Policy Polling	October 20–21, 2016	32%	36%	13%	990 likely voters	
Fox News	June, 2016	22%	32%	23%		

== Four-way race ==
=== By race or ethnicity ===
==== African Americans ====
Poll source	Date	Hillary Clinton Democratic	Donald Trump Republican	Gary Johnson Libertarian	Jill Stein Green	Sample size	Margin of error
Pew Research	October 20–25, 2016	81%	3%	6%	2%	2,120 registered voters	
ABC News	October 20–22, 2016	82%	3%	2%	5%	874 likely voters	±3.5%
SurveyUSA/Boston Globe/Colby College	October 11–14, 2016	85%	6%	2%	0%	845 likely voters	±3.4%
CBS News/New York Times	September 28-October 2, 2016	80%	7%	5%	2%	1,501 adults	±4.0%
ABC News/Washington Post	September 19–22, 2016	89%	2%	2%	3%	1,001 adults	±4.5%
YouGov/The Economist	September 18–19, 2016	79%	3%	2%	1%	1,300 adults	±3.9%
YouGov/The Economist	September 4–6, 2016	78%	8%	3%	0%	1,300 adults	±4.4%
Public Policy Polling	August 26–28, 2016	73%	9%	3%	6%	881 likely voters	±3.3%

==== Hispanic Americans ====
Poll source	Date	Hillary Clinton Democratic	Donald Trump Republican	Gary Johnson Libertarian	Jill Stein Green	Sample size	Margin of error
Pew Research	October 20–25, 2016	65%	18%	6%	4%	2,120 registered voters	
ABC News	October 20–22, 2016	63%	25%	9%	1%	874 likely voters	±3.5%
SurveyUSA/Boston Globe/Colby College	October 11–14, 2016	60%	25%	7%	4%	845 likely voters	±3.4%
ABC News/Washington Post	September 19–22, 2016	68%	19%	8%	3%	1,001 adults	±4.5%
YouGov/The Economist	September 18–19, 2016	54%	23%	9%	2%	1,300 adults	±3.9%
YouGov/The Economist	September 4–6, 2016	56%	20%	1%	15%	1,300 adults	±4.4%
Pew Research	August 9–16, 2016	50%	26%	9%	9%		

==== White Americans ====
Poll source	Date	Hillary Clinton Democratic	Donald Trump Republican	Gary Johnson Libertarian	Jill Stein Green	Sample size	Margin of error
CNN/Opinion Research Corporation	October 20–23, 2016	39%	52%	4%	2%	779 likely voters	±4.0%
ABC News	October 20–22, 2016	43%	47%	5%	1%	874 likely voters	±3.5%
Quinnipiac University	October 5–6, 2016	38%	51%	5%	2%	1,064 likely voters	± 3.0%
CBS News/New York Times	September 28-October 2, 2016	37%	49%	8%	2%	1,501 adults	±4.0%
YouGov/The Economist	September 18–19, 2016	32%	46%	7%	2%	1,300 adults	±3.9%
Ipsos/Reuters	September 15–19, 2016	31%	41%	10%	3%	1,098 White American registered voters	±3.4%
YouGov/The Economist	September 4–6, 2016	32%	45%	9%	4%	1,300 adults	±4.4%
Ipsos/Reuters	August 25–29, 2016	35%	42%	7%	2%	1,496 Americans	±2.5%
Pew Research	August 9–16, 2016	33%	45%	11%	4%		
YouGov/The Economist	July 30 – August 1, 2016	33%	42%	10%	4%	1300 adults	± 4.0%

=== By gender ===
==== Female Americans ====
Poll source	Date	Hillary Clinton Democratic	Donald Trump Republican	Gary Johnson Libertarian	Jill Stein Green	Sample size	Margin of error
Pew Research	October 20–25, 2016	52%	36%	4%	2%	2,120 registered voters	
CNN/Opinion Research Corporation	October 20–23, 2016	52%	39%	3%	1%	779 likely voters	±5.0%
ABC News	October 20–22, 2016	55%	35%	3%	2%	874 likely voters	±3.5%
CBS News/New York Times	September 28-October 2, 2016	51%	33%	8%	3%	1,501 adults	±4.0%
ABC News/Washington Post	September 19–22, 2016	55%	36%	4%	2%	1,001 adults	±4.5%
YouGov/The Economist	September 18–19, 2016	44%	37%	4%	2%	1,300 adults	±3.9%
Ipsos/Reuters	September 15–19, 2016	39%	31%	9%	5%	808 registered voters	±3.9%
Emerson College	September 11–13, 2016	53%	34%	7%	1%	800 likely voters	±3.4%

==== Male Americans ====
Poll source	Date	Hillary Clinton Democratic	Donald Trump Republican	Gary Johnson Libertarian	Jill Stein Green	Sample size	Margin of error
Pew Research	October 20–25, 2016	39%	43%	8%	4%	2,120 registered voters	
CNN/Opinion Research Corporation	October 20–23, 2016	44%	47%	4%	3%	779 likely voters	±5.0%
CBS News/New York Times	September 28-October 2, 2016	38%	49%	7%	2%	1,501 adults	±4%
ABC News/Washington Post	September 19–22, 2016	35%	54%	7%	1%	1,001 adults	±4.5%
YouGov/The Economist	September 18–19, 2016	37%	39%	10%	3%	1,300 adults	±3.9%
Emerson College	September 11–13, 2016	28%	52%	11%	3%	800 likely voters	±3.4%
Ipsos/Reuters	August 25–29, 2016	42%	37%	8%	2%	1,946 Americans	±2.5%
Quinnipiac University	August 18–24, 2016	35%	42%	14%	6%		
Pew Research	August 9–16, 2016	33%	45%	10%	4%		
RABA Research	July 29, 2016	42%	35%	8%	3%	956 Americans	± 3.2%
YouGov/The Economist	July 23–24, 2016	35%	45%	6%	3%	1300 general population respondents	± 4.2%

=== By education ===
==== White Americans with a college degree ====
Poll source	Date	Hillary Clinton Democratic	Donald Trump Republican	Gary Johnson Libertarian	Jill Stein Green	Sample size	Margin of error
CNN/Opinion Research Corporation	October 20–23, 2016	51%	40%	5%	1%	779 likely voters	±5.5%
ABC News	October 20–22, 2016	52%	36%	7%	1%	874 likely voters	±3.5%
CBS News/New York Times	September 28-October 2, 2016	49%	37%	8%	3%	1,501 adults	±4.0%
ABC News/Washington Post	September 19–22, 2016	48%	39%	8%	2%	1,001 adults	±4.5%

==== White Americans without a college degree ====
Poll source	Date	Hillary Clinton Democratic	Donald Trump Republican	Gary Johnson Libertarian	Jill Stein Green	Sample size	Margin of error
CNN/Opinion Research Corporation	October 20–23, 2016	31%	60%	3%	2%	779 likely voters	±5.5%
ABC News	October 20–22, 2016	36%	55%	3%	2%	874 likely voters	±3.5%
CBS News/New York Times	September 28-October 2, 2016	30%	56%	8%	1%	1,501 adults	±4.0%
ABC News/Washington Post	September 19–22, 2016	30%	62%	4%	<1%	1,001 adults	±4.5%

=== By age ===
==== Americans aged 18–34 ====
Poll source	Date	Hillary Clinton Democratic	Donald Trump Republican	Gary Johnson Libertarian	Jill Stein Green	Sample size	Margin of error
USA Today/Rock the Vote	October 24–27, 2016	62%	21%	8%	4%	668 likely voters	±5.5%
SurveyUSA/Boston Globe/Colby College	October 11–14, 2016	55%	25%	6%	5%	845 likely voters	±3.4%
USA Today/Rock the Vote	October 11–13, 2016	68%	20%	8%	1%	400 likely voters	±5.5%
Quinnipiac	September 8–13, 2016	31%	26%	29%	15%	960 likely voters	±3.2%
Investor's Business Daily	July 29-August 4, 2016	30%	12%	35%	14%	851 likely voters	±3.2%

==== Americans aged 35–49 ====
Poll source	Date	Hillary Clinton Democratic	Donald Trump Republican	Gary Johnson Libertarian	Jill Stein Green	Sample size	Margin of error
CNN/Opinion Research Corporation	October 20–23, 2016	48%	41%	4%	2%	779 likely voters	±8.5%
Quinnipiac	September 8–13, 2016	44%	31%	19%	2%	960 likely voters	±3.2%

==== Americans aged 50–64 ====
Poll source	Date	Hillary Clinton Democratic	Donald Trump Republican	Gary Johnson Libertarian	Jill Stein Green	Sample size	Margin of error
Pew Research	October 20–25, 2016	43%	47%	4%	2%	2,120 registered voters	
CNN/Opinion Research Corporation	October 20–23, 2016	46%	50%	2%	1%	779 likely voters	±6.0%
Quinnipiac	September 8–13, 2016	42%	47%	6%	3%	960 likely voters	±3.2%

==== Americans aged 65+ ====
Poll source	Date	Hillary Clinton Democratic	Donald Trump Republican	Gary Johnson Libertarian	Jill Stein Green	Sample size	Margin of error
Pew Research	October 20–25, 2016	45%	47%	3%	1%	2,120 registered voters	
ABC News/Washington Post	September 19–22, 2016	41%	53%	2%	2%	1,001 adults	±4.5%
Quinnipiac	September 8–13, 2016	42%	49%	4%	1%	960 likely voters	±3.2%

=== Other criteria ===
==== Independent voters ====
Poll source	Date	Hillary Clinton Democratic	Donald Trump Republican	Gary Johnson Libertarian	Jill Stein Green	Sample size	Margin of error
Bloomberg Politics/Purple Insights	October 28–31, 2016	30%	27%	19%	8%	601 likely voters who identify as independent	± 4.0%
Fox News	September 11–14, 2016	31%	36%	16%	7%	1,006 registered voters	±3.0%
CNN/Opinion Research Corporation	September 1–4, 2016	29%	49%	16%	6%	1,001 adults	±3.5%
Quinnipiac University	August 18–24, 2016	33%	34%	19%	9%	1,498 likely voters	±2.5%
Ipsos/Reuters	July 25–29, 2016	21%	19%	18%	6%	1,788 registered voters	± 2.4%

==== Americans with household incomes of $100,000 or more ====
Poll source	Date	Hillary Clinton Democratic	Donald Trump Republican	Gary Johnson Libertarian	Jill Stein Green	Sample size	Margin of error
Bloomberg Politics/Purple Insights	September 16–19, 2016	41%	37%	9%	2%	600 likely voters	±4.0%

==== Military ====
Poll source	Date	Hillary Clinton Democratic	Donald Trump Republican	Gary Johnson Libertarian	Jill Stein Green	Sample size	Margin of error
Military Times/Syracuse University	September 2016	16.3%	37.6%	36.5%	1.2%	2,200 active-duty military	±2.0%

==== LGBT Americans ====
Poll source	Date	Hillary Clinton Democratic	Donald Trump Republican	Gary Johnson Libertarian	Jill Stein Green	Sample size	Margin of error
Pew Research	September 27-October 10, 2016	72%	13%	7%	8%	167 registered voters who identify as lesbian, gay or bisexual	

== See also ==
General election polling

- Nationwide opinion polling for the United States presidential election, 2016
- Statewide opinion polling for the United States presidential election, 2016
- International opinion polling for the United States presidential election, 2016

Democratic primary polling

- Nationwide opinion polling for the Democratic Party 2016 presidential primaries
- Statewide opinion polling for the Democratic Party presidential primaries, 2016

Republican primary polling

- Nationwide opinion polling for the Republican Party 2016 presidential primaries
- Statewide opinion polling for the Republican Party presidential primaries, 2016
