= International opinion polling for the 2016 United States presidential election =

This article lists international opinion polls taken in various countries around the world prior to the United States presidential election of 2016. Clinton was heavily favored in every foreign country where polling occurred, except for Russia.

== Global polls ==
Hillary Clinton, Democratic Party
Donald Trump, Republican Party

Country	YouGov/ Handelsblatt, April 2016	Pew Research Center, June 2016		WIN/GIA, August 2016	
Country	YouGov/ Handelsblatt, April 2016	Clinton	Trump	Clinton	Trump
Afghanistan	—N/a	—N/a	—N/a	61%	22%
Argentina	Clinton (+30%)	—N/a	—N/a	51%	5%
Australia	Clinton (+29%)	70%	11%	67%	15%
Austria	—N/a	—N/a	—N/a	78%	9%
Azerbaijan	—N/a	—N/a	—N/a	61%	3%
Bangladesh	—N/a	—N/a	—N/a	62%	8%
Brazil	Clinton (+34%)	—N/a	—N/a	77%	11%
Bulgaria	—N/a	—N/a	—N/a	51%	26%
Canada	Clinton (+17%)	60%	14%	69%	12%
China	Clinton (+12%)	37%	22%	53%	44%
Colombia	—N/a	—N/a	—N/a	81%	6%
Ecuador	—N/a	—N/a	—N/a	56%	6%
Egypt	—N/a	—N/a	—N/a	53%	9%
Finland	—N/a	—N/a	—N/a	86%	7%
France	Clinton (+30%)	71%	9%	72%	10%
Germany	Clinton (+36%)	79%	6%	77%	8%
Greece	—N/a	15%	3%	69%	12%
Hong Kong	—N/a	—N/a	—N/a	73%	16%
Hungary	—N/a	44%	20%	—N/a	—N/a
India	Clinton (+29%)	28%	14%	49%	27%
Indonesia	Clinton (+32%)	—N/a	—N/a	—N/a	—N/a
Iraq	—N/a	—N/a	—N/a	56%	23%
Ireland	—N/a	—N/a	—N/a	74%	12%
Italy	Clinton (+38%)	52%	21%	73%	16%
Japan	Clinton (+27%)	70%	9%	60%	3%
Jordan	—N/a	—N/a	—N/a	66%	3%
South Korea	Clinton (+37%)	—N/a	—N/a	82%	3%
Latvia	—N/a	—N/a	—N/a	46%	22%
Lebanon	—N/a	—N/a	—N/a	45%	22%
Macedonia	—N/a	—N/a	—N/a	48%	20%
Mexico	Clinton (+54%)	—N/a	—N/a	78%	5%
Netherlands	—N/a	76%	7%	77%	8%
Nigeria	—N/a	—N/a	—N/a	77%	19%
Norway	—N/a	—N/a	—N/a	73%	14%
Pakistan	—N/a	—N/a	—N/a	51%	17%
Palestine	—N/a	—N/a	—N/a	40%	18%
Panama	—N/a	—N/a	—N/a	65%	11%
Paraguay	—N/a	—N/a	—N/a	74%	6%
Peru	—N/a	—N/a	—N/a	44%	4%
Portugal	—N/a	—N/a	—N/a	85%	5%
Poland	—N/a	41%	15%	—N/a	—N/a
Russia	Trump (+21%)	—N/a	—N/a	10%	33%
Saudi Arabia	Clinton (+20%)	—N/a	—N/a	—N/a	—N/a
Slovenia	—N/a	—N/a	—N/a	52%	22%
South Africa	Clinton (+24%)	—N/a	—N/a	59%	15%
Spain	Clinton (+35%)	51%	8%	70%	4%
Sweden	—N/a	83%	6%	82%	7%
Thailand	—N/a	—N/a	—N/a	65%	11%
Turkey	Clinton (+28%)	—N/a	—N/a	—N/a	—N/a
United Kingdom	Clinton (+34%)	66%	12%	64%	15%

== Individual country polls ==
=== Chile ===
CADEM conducted a poll in Chile regarding the United States presidential election in late September 2016, right after the first presidential debate. Hillary Clinton had a 68% of favorable evaluation and 29% of negative evaluation, while Donald Trump had 13% of favourable evaluation and 84% of negative. 80% of Chileans thought that Hillary Clinton would be a better president of the United States and only 5% said Donald Trump.

=== Czech Republic ===
October 2016: Don't know or do not care 47%, Hillary Clinton 39%, Donald Trump 14%.

November 2016: Donald Trump 57.4%, Hillary Clinton 26.3%, Evan McMullin 7.3%, Gary Johnson 4.7%, Jill Stein 3.2%, Darrell Castle 1.1%.

=== Israel ===
In June 2016 poll for Channel 2, 42% of Israelis favored Hillary Clinton and 35% Donald Trump when asked whom they would vote for if they were able to participate in the election. In the same poll, 37% said they believe Trump would be better for Israel, while 36% said Clinton.

In a November 2016 poll by the Rafi Smith Institute, 49% of Israelis favored Hillary Clinton and 32% Donald Trump.

=== New Zealand ===
According to poll conducted by Newshub/Reid Research in July 2016, 76% of New Zealanders would vote for Hillary Clinton and 9% for Donald Trump.

== See also ==
- International opinion polling for the United States presidential election, 2008
- Nationwide opinion polling for the United States presidential election, 2016
- Nationwide opinion polling for the United States presidential election by demographics, 2016
- Statewide opinion polling for the United States presidential election, 2016
