= Nationwide opinion polling for the 2016 Democratic Party presidential primaries =

This is a list of nationwide public opinion polls that have been conducted relating to the Democratic primaries for the 2016 United States presidential election. The persons named in the polls are declared candidates, are former candidates, or have received media speculation about their possible candidacy.

== Aggregate polling ==
In the following tables, blue indicates the highest percentage and percentages within the margin of error of the highest in each poll.

Source of aggregate poll	Date updated	Date polled	Method	Hillary; Clinton	Bernie; Sanders	Others / Undecided
FiveThirtyEight Average	June 24, 2016	February 25 – June 29, 2016	Weighted	54.1%	37.4%	8.5%
HuffPost Pollster Model	June 24, 2016	—	—	53.8%	39.3%	6.9%
RealClear Politics Average	June 24, 2016	May 13–June 5, 2016	Average of last 5 polls	52.8%	41.4%	5.8%
270 to Win Average	June 24, 2016	May 13–June 6, 2016	Average of last 3 polls	52.0%	38.0%	10.0%

== Individual polls ==
=== Polls conducted in 2016 ===
Summary of the opinion polls taken since January 2016 for the Democratic Party presidential primaries

Poll source	Sample size	Margin of error	Date(s) administered	Hillary Clinton	Bernie Sanders	Others / Undecided
YouGov/Economist	390		June 18–20, 2016	55%	42%	4%
Morning Consult	1,733	2.0%	June 15–20, 2016	53%	35%	12%
NBC/SurveyMonkey	3,092	1.3%	June 6–12, 2016	58%	36%	6%
YouGov	698		June 2–5, 2016	52%	41%	7%
Morning Consult	1,811	2.3%	June 1–5, 2016	51%	38%	11%
IBD/TIPP	351	5.3%	May 31 – June 5, 2016	51%	37%	12%
NBC/SurveyMonkey	4,332	2.0%	May 30 – June 5, 2016	53%	40%	7%
Ipsos/Reuters	850	3.4%	May 28 – June 1, 2016	44%	44%	12%
Quinnipiac	678	3.8%	May 24–30, 2016	53%	39%	8%
Morning Consult	1,859	2.3%	May 24–30, 2016	46%	42%	12%
NBC/SurveyMonkey	4,227	2.0%	May 23–29, 2016	53%	42%	5%
Ipsos/Reuters	800	2.8%	May 21–25, 2016	44%	43%	13%
YouGov/Economist	711	3.1%	May 20–23, 2016	52%	41%	7%
Morning Consult	975	1.0%	May 19–23, 2016	48%	42%	10%
NBC/SurveyMonkey	4,888	1.0%	May 16–22, 2016	51%	42%	7%
ABC News/Washington Post	829	3.5%	May 16–19, 2016	56%	42%	2%
Ipsos/Reuters	868	2.7%	May 14–18, 2016	44%	43%	13%
NBC/SurveyMonkey	4,348	2.0%	May 9–15, 2016	54%	40%	6%
Morning Consult	1,855	2.3%	May 11–15, 2016	47%	41%	12%
Ipsos/Reuters	819	2.8%	May 7–11, 2016	46%	44%	10%
Morning Consult	2,728	1.9%	May 5–9, 2016	49%	40%	11%
NBC/SurveyMonkey	3,905	2.0%	May 2–8, 2016	53%	41%	6%
Ipsos/Reuters	679	3.1%	April 30 – May 4, 2016	47%	40%	13%
Morning Consult	948	3.2%	April 29 – May 2, 2016	51%	38%	11%
CNN/ORC	405	5.0%	April 28 – May 1, 2016	51%	43%	6%
NBC/SurveyMonkey	4,418	1.9%	April 25 – May 1, 2016	54%	40%	6%
Morning Consult	906	3.2%	April 26–29, 2016	49%	40%	11%
IBD/TIPP	355	5.3%	April 22–28, 2016	49%	43%	8%
Ipsos/Reuters	1,062	3.0%	April 23–27, 2016	47%	42%	11%
YouGov/Economist	635	2.8%	April 22–26, 2016	47%	43%	10%
Suffolk University/USA Today	363	5.1%	April 20–24, 2016	50.4%	44.9%	4.7%
NBC/SurveyMonkey	10,707	1.4%	April 18–24, 2016	52%	42%	6%
Morning Consult	929	2.0%	April 20–22, 2016	48%	42%	10%
Ipsos/Reuters	835	2.8%	April 16–20, 2016	43%	42%	15%
Pew Research	738	-	April 12–19, 2016	54%	42%	4%
Morning Consult	941	2%	April 15–17, 2016	46%	43%	11%
NBC/SurveyMonkey	3,821	1.3%	April 11–17, 2016	50%	43%	7%
NBC/Wall Street Journal	339	5.3%	April 10–14, 2016	50%	48%	2%
FOX News	450	3.0%	April 11–13, 2016	48%	46%	6%
Ipsos/Reuters	849	2.7%	April 9–13, 2016	42%	47%	11%
CBS News	359	3.0%	April 8–12, 2016	50%	44%	6%
YouGov/Economist	684	2.8%	April 8–11, 2016	49%	41%	10%
NBC/SurveyMonkey	3,746	1.3%	April 4–10, 2016	49%	43%	8%
Ipsos/Reuters	781	2.9%	April 2–6, 2016	38%	44%	18%
Morning Consult	884	2%	April 1–3, 2016	47%	39%	14%
Public Religion Research Institute/The Atlantic	788	N/A	March 30 – April 3, 2016	46%	47%	7%
NBC News/SurveyMonkey	4,292	1.8%	March 28 – April 3, 2016	51%	42%	7%
IBD/TIPP	388	5.1%	March 28 – April 2, 2016	45%	44%	11%
McClatchy/Marist	497	4.4%	March 29–31, 2016	47%	49%	4%
Ipsos/Reuters	788	2.8%	March 27–31, 2016	46%	43%	11%
YouGov/Economist	651	2.8%	March 26–29, 2016	53%	40%	7%
NBC/SurveyMonkey	1,922	2.9%	March 21–27, 2016	49%	43%	8%
Pew Research	842	2.4%	March 17–27, 2016	49%	43%	8%
Morning Consult	2,071	2.0%	March 24–26, 2016	50%	39%	11%
Public Policy Polling	505	4.4%	March 24–26, 2016	54%	36%	10%
Ipsos/Reuters	788	2.8%	March 19–23, 2016	42%	47%	12%
McLaughlin & Associates	470	3.1%	March 17–23, 2016	50.2%	38.3%	11.5%
Fox News	410	5.0%	March 20–22, 2016	55%	42%	3%
Bloomberg/Selzer & Co.	311	5.6%	March 19–22, 2016	48%	49%	3%
Morning Consult	2,001	2%	March 18–21, 2016	51%	39%	11%
Quinnipiac	635	3.9%	March 16–21, 2016	50%	38%	12%
CBS/NYT	388	6%	March 17–20, 2016	50%	45%	5%
CNN/ORC	397	5.0%	March 17–20, 2016	51%	44%	5%
Monmouth	391	5.0%	March 17–20, 2016	55%	37%	8%
NBC/SurveyMonkey	11,600	1.4%	March 14–20, 2016	53%	41%	6%
Morning Consult	2,011	2.0%	March 16–18, 2016	49%	40%	11%
Ipsos/Reuters	832	2.7%	March 12–16, 2016	44%	44%	12%
Morning Consult	1842	2.0%	March 11–13, 2016	48%	40%	12%
NBC/SurveyMonkey	2,597	1.7%	March 7–13, 2016	54%	41%	5%
YouGov	400	2.9%	March 10–12, 2016	52%	40%	8%
Ipsos/Reuters	955	2.6%	March 5–9, 2016	46%	39%	16%
Morning Consult	960	2.0%	March 4–6, 2016	52%	36%	12%
NBC News/Wall Street Journal	410	4.8%	March 3–6, 2016	53%	44%	3%
ABC News/Wash Post	356	5.5%	March 3–6, 2016	49%	42%	9%
NBC/SurveyMonkey	6,245	1.1%	February 29 – March 6, 2016	55%	38%	7%
Ipsos/Reuters	839	4.3%	February 27 – March 2, 2016	47%	40%	13%
NBC/SurveyMonkey	8,702	1.7%	February 22–28, 2016	51%	41%	9%
Rasmussen Reports	541	4.5%	February 22–28, 2016	53%	31%	Other 9% Undecided 6%
Morning Consult	891	2.0%	February 26–27, 2016	51%	35%	14%
CNN/ORC	427	5.0%	February 24–27, 2016	55%	38%	7%
YouGov	535	2.9%	February 24–27, 2016	55%	37%	8%
Morning Consult	1,723	2%	February 24–25, 2016	50%	35%	15%
NBC News / SurveyMonkey	2,092	3%	February 24–25, 2016	52%	41%	7%
Ipsos/Reuters	753	4.4%	February 20–24, 2016	42%	44%	14%
IBD/TIPP	334	5.5%	February 19–24, 2016	45%	43%	12%
NBC/SurveyMonkey	3,338	1.8%	February 15–21, 2016	51%	40%	Others / Undecided 9%
McLaughlin & Associates	1,000	3.1%	February 17, 2016	42.5%	42.6%	Undecided 14.9%
Fox News	429	4.5%	February 15–17, 2016	44%	47%	Other 1% None of the above 1% Don't know 7%
Ipsos/Reuters	737	4%	February 13–17, 2016	45%	42%	Wouldn't vote 14%
Morning Consult	829	2%	February 15–16, 2016	47%	39%	Someone else 5% Undecided 9%
NBC News/Wall Street Journal	400	4.9%	February 14–16, 2016	53%	42%	Not sure 4% None 1%
CBS News	549	5%	February 12–16, 2016	47%	39%	Don't know 10%
YouGov/Economist	527	2.8%	February 11–15, 2016	53%	39%	Other 2% No Preference 6%
Suffolk University/USA Today	319	5.5%	February 11–15, 2016	53%	40%	Undecided 10%
Quinnipiac University	563	4.1%	February 10–15, 2016	44%	42%	Wouldn't vote 2% Don't know/NA 11%
NBC/SurveyMonkey	3,847	1.8%	February 8–14, 2016	50%	40%	Don't know 8% No answer 1%
Morning Consult	811	3.4%	February 10–11, 2016	46%	39%	Other 8% Undecided 7%
Ipsos/Reuters	600	2.8%	February 6–10, 2016	55%	43%	Undecided 3%
Morning Consult	1988	1%	February 3–7, 2016	50%	37%	Undecided 8%
NBC/SurveyMonkey	3154	1.4%	February 1–7, 2016	51%	39%	Undecided 8% No answer 1%
Ipsos/Reuters	512	5%	February 2–5, 2016	48%	45%	Other 5%
Rasmussen Reports	574	4.5%	February 3–4, 2016	50%	32%	Other 12% Undecided 6%
Quinnipiac University	484	4.5%	February 2–4, 2016	44%	42%	Other 1% Wouldn't vote 2% Don't know/NA 1%
Public Policy Polling	517	4.3%	February 2–3, 2016	53%	32%	Undecided 14%
Morning Consult	719	3.6%	February 2–3, 2016	51%	35%	Other 6% Don't know/No opinion 8%

Poll source	Sample size	Margin of error	Date(s) administered	Hillary Clinton	Martin O'Malley	Bernie Sanders	Others
Ipsos/Reuters	704	4.2%	January 30, 2016 – February 3, 2016	54%	2%	39%	Wouldn't vote 5%
Morning Consult	1928	2.2%	January 29, 2016 – February 1, 2016	50%	5%	34%	Other 5% Don't know/No opinion 9%
NBC/SurveyMonkey	3233	2.3%	January 25–31, 2016	50%	2%	39%	Don't know 8% No answer 1%
YouGov/Economist	531	2.9%	January 27–30, 2016	52%	2%	40%	N/A
Ipsos/Reuters	231	7%	January 25–29, 2016	58%	3%	38%	Other 2%
IBD/TIPP	378	5.1%	January 22–27, 2016	50%	2%	38%	Other / Undecided 10%
CNN / ORC	440	4.5%	January 21–24, 2016	52%	2%	38%	Other 8%
Washington Post / ABC News	406	5.5%	January 21–24, 2016	55%	4%	36%	Other 5%
Fox News	375	5%	January 18–21, 2016	49%	1%	37%	Other 1% None of the above 2% Don't know 10%
Zogby	373	N/A	January 19–20, 2016	49%	10%	27%	Undecided 14%
Ipsos/Reuters	629	2.8%	January 16–20, 2016	54%	4%	35%	Wouldn't vote 7%
YouGov/Economist	2000	2.9%	January 15–19, 2016	50%	2%	41%	N/A
Monmouth University	352	5.4%	January 15–18, 2016	52%	2%	37%	Other 0% No one 4% Undecided 4%
NBC News/Wall Street Journal	400	4.9%	January 9–13, 2016	59%	2%	34%	N/A
New York Times/CBS News	389	6%	January 7–10, 2016	48%	2%	41%	None of them 3% Don't know/No answer 6%
NBC/SurveyMonkey	2619	2.4%	January 4–10, 2016	52%	2%	37%	Don't know 8% No answer 1%
IBD/TIPP	378	5.1%	January 4–8, 2016	43%	2%	39%	Other 6% Undecided 9% Refused 1%
Fox News	360	5%	January 4–7, 2016	54%	3%	39%	Other 1% None of the above 1% Unsure 2%
Ipsos/Reuters	709	4.2%	January 2–6, 2016	58%	3%	30%	Wouldn't Vote 9%
YouGov/Economist	533	2.8%	December 31, 2015 – January 6, 2016	54%	3%	37%	No preference 4% Other 1%
NBC/SurveyMonkey	3,700	1.9%	December 28, 2015 – January 3, 2016	53%	2%	36%	Undecided 8% No Answer 1%

=== Polls conducted in 2015 ===
Polls in 2015

Poll source	Sample size	Margin of error	Date(s) administered	Hillary; Clinton	Martin; O'Malley	Bernie; Sanders	Others
Ipsos/Reuters	825	2.5%	December 26–30, 2015	57%	3%	32%	Wouldn't Vote 8%
Ipsos/Reuters	603	4.6%	December 19–23, 2015	58%	4%	31%	Wouldn't Vote 7%
Rasmussen Reports	546	4.5%	December 20–21, 2015	46%	9%	30%	Other 9% Undecided 7%
YouGov/Economist	565	3.1%	December 18–21, 2015	53%	2%	39%	Other 1% Undecided 4%
CNN/ORC	414	5%	December 17–21, 2015	50%	3%	34%	Someone else 7% None 4% No opinion 1%
Emerson College Polling Society	332	5.3%	December 17–20, 2015	65%	2%	26%	Other 3% Undecided 4%
Qunnipiac University	462	2.6%	December 16–20, 2015	61%	2%	30%	Wouldn't Vote 1% Undecided 6%
Fox News	390	3.0%	December 16–17, 2015	56%	2%	34%	None of the Above 2% Other 1% Undecided 4%
Public Policy Polling	525	4.3%	December 16–17, 2015	56%	9%	28%	Undecided 7%
Ipos/Reuters	760	4.0%	December 12–16, 2015	58%	3%	29%	Wouldn't Vote 10%
Morning Consult	1790	2.0%	December 11–15, 2015	52%	2%	27%	Other 6% Undecided 12%
Monmouth University	374	5.1%	December 10–13, 2015	59%	4%	26%	Other 1% Undecided 8% No One 3%
ABC/Washington Post	377	3.5%	December 1–13, 2015	59%	5%	28%	None 2% Not Voting 2% Other 1% Undecided 4%
NBC News/Wall Street Journal	849	3.36%	December 6–9, 2015	56%	4%	37%	None 2% Not Sure 1%
Ipsos/Reuters	573	4.7%	December 5–9, 2015	56%	5%	30%	Wouldn't Vote 9%
YouGov/Economist	647	3.0%	December 4–9, 2015	56%	2%	35%	Other 2% Undecided 5%
CBS/New York Times	384	6.0%	December 4–8, 2015	52%	2%	32%	None 5% Don't Know/No Answer 9%
Morning Consult	808	2.0%	December 3–7, 2015	52%	2%	23%	Other 9% Undecided 14%
Public Religion Research Institute	463	3.7%	December 2–6, 2015	52%	4%	31%	Other 1% Undecided 13%
USA Today/Suffolk University	363	3.0%	December 2–6, 2015	56%	4%	26%	Undecided 11%
IBD/TIPP	345	5.4%	November 30 – December 4, 2015	51%	1%	33%	Undecided 8%
Ipsos/Reuters	430	5.4%	November 28 – December 2, 2015	51%	4%	36%	Wouldn't Vote 10%
CNN/ORC	1,020	3.0%	November 27 – December 1, 2015	58%	2%	30%	Someone else 7% None/No one 2% No opinion 1%
Quinnipiac; University	573	4.1%	November 23–30, 2015	60%	2%	30%	Someone else 1% Wouldn't vote 1% Don't know 6%
Ipsos/Reuters	362	5.9%	November 21–25, 2015	58%	6%	30%	Wouldn't Vote 8%
YouGov/Economist	764	3.1%	November 19–23, 2015	54%	4%	34%	Other 2% Undecided 5%
ABC News/Washington Post	352	6.0%	November 16–19, 2015	60%	3%	34%	None 1% Other 1% Undecided 1%
FOX News	1016	3.0%	November 16–19, 2015	55%	3%	32%	None of the above 5% Undecided 5%
Ipsos/Reuters	1275	3.9%	November 14–18, 2015	52%	4%	31%	Wouldn't Vote 13%
Public Policy Polling	538	2.7%	November 16–17, 2015	59%	7%	26%	Undecided 8%
Bloomberg/Selzer	385	3.1%	November 15–17, 2015	55%	3%	30%	Undecided 8%
NBC News/SurveyMonkey	5,755	3.1%	November 15–17, 2015	49%	1%	33%	Someone else 4% Wouldn't vote/Don't know 11% No answer 1%
Rasmussen Reports	506	4.5%	November 15–16, 2015	50%	6%	29%	
Morning Consult	874	2%	November 13–16, 2015	57%	2%	26%	Undecided 9%
Public Policy Polling	510	4.3%	November 12–14, 2015	67%	4%	25%	Not sure 5%
YouGov/UMass	381	6%	November 5–13, 2015	63%	6%	29%	Other 2%
Ipsos/Reuters	609	2.8%	November 7–11, 2015	51%	3%	35%	Undecided 10%
Public Religion Research Institute	304	3.7%	November 6–10, 2015	64%	2%	25%	Other 1% Undecided 7%
CBS News/Times	418	6.0%	November 6–10, 2015	52%	5%	33%	
YouGov/Economist	658	3.0%	November 5–9, 2015	59%	2%	31%	Other 2% Undecided 6%
Harvard Institute of Politics	751	2.8	October 30 – November 9, 2015	35%	<1%	41%	Don't know 22%
Morning Consult	1739	2.0%	November 5–8, 2015	54%	3%	28%	Other 7% Undecided 8%
Ipsos/Reuters	629	4.5%	October 31 – November 4, 2015	57%	6%	28%	Wouldn't vote 9%
McClatchy/Marist	511	4.3%	October 29 – November 4, 2015	57%	4%	35%	Undecided 4%
Fox News	505	3.0%	November 1–3, 2015	56%	2%	31%	Other 2% None 4% Don't Know 4%

Poll source	Sample size	Margin of error	Date(s) administered	Hillary; Clinton	Lawrence; Lessig	Martin; O'Malley	Bernie; Sanders	Others
UCS/LA Times/SurveyMonkey	1242	3.0%	October 29 – November 3, 2015	48%	1%	2%	28%	Other 3% Undecided 19%
Quinnipiac; University	480	4.5%	October 29 – November 2, 2015	53%	1%	0%	35%	Wouldn't vote 2% Don't know 9%
Morning Consult	1015	2.0%	October 29 – November 1, 2015	56%	—	2%	26%	Other 7% Undecided 10%
NBC News/Wall Street Journal	400	4.9%	October 25–29, 2015	62%	—	3%	31%	Other 1% Undecided 2%
Investor's Business Daily/TIPP	356	5.3%	October 24–29, 2015	48%	—	2%	33%	Someone else 7% Unsure 8% Refused 2%
NBC/SurveyMonkey	1226	3.7%	October 27–29, 2015	50%	1%	1%	30%	Someone else 5% Wouldn't vote/Don't know 12% No answer 1%
Ipsos/Reuters	676	2.7%	October 24–28, 2015	53%	—	2%	33%	Wouldn't vote 12%
YouGov/Economist	2000	3%	October 23–27, 2015	61%	1%	2%	29%	Other 1% No preference 6%
Morning Consult	688	2%	October 22–25, 2015	53%	—	5%	26%	Someone else 6% Undecided 10%

Poll source	Sample size	Margin of error	Date(s) administered	Joe; Biden	Lincoln; Chafee	Hillary; Clinton	Lawrence; Lessig	Martin; O'Malley	Bernie; Sanders	Jim; Webb	Others
Ipsos/Reuters	895	3.8%	October 17–21, 2015	16%	1%	45%	—	1%	29%	—	Undecided 9%
Morning Consult	895	2.0%	October 15–19, 2015	—	1%	56%	—	1%	24%	1%	Other 6% Undecided 12%
ABC News/Washington Post	444	3.5%	October 15–18, 2015	16%	0%	54%	—	1%	23%	1%	None 2% Not Voting 1% Other 1 Undecided 1%
Monmouth University	340	5.3%	October 15–18, 2015	17%	< 1%	48%	1%	< 1%	21%	1%	Other 0% No one 3% Undecided 9%
NBC News/Wall Street Journal	400	3.9%	October 15–18, 2015	15%	0%	49%	—	1%	29%	2%	None 2% Undecided 2% Other 0%
Emerson College Polling Society	390	3.4%	October 16–17, 2015	—	0%	68%	—	3%	20%	1%	Other 2% Undecided 6%
CNN/ORC	1024	3%	October 14–17, 2015	18%	< 1%	45%	< 1%	< 1%	29%	1%	Someone else 2% No-one 2% No answer 2%
NBC/SurveyMonkey	1857	3.2%	October 13–15, 2015	10%	0%	45%	0%	1%	31%	1%	Someone else 2% Wouldn't Vote 9% No answer 1%
Ipsos/Reuters	530	3.0%	October 10–14, 2015	16%	1%	51%	—	2%	24%	—	Wouldn't Vote 6%
Fox News	353	—	October 10–12, 2015	19%	0%	45%	< 1%	1%	25%	< 1%	Don't Know 5%
YouGov/Economist	633	2.8%	October 8–12, 2015	20%	1%	48%	1%	2%	23%	0%	No preference 6%
Morning Consult	862	2%	October 8–10, 2015	—	1%	54%	—	1%	22%	1%	Don't Know 15%
Reuters/Ipsos	624	4.5%	October 9, 2015	20%	< 3%	41%	—	< 3%	28%	< 3%	Wouldn't Vote 8%
CBS News	343	6%	October 4–8, 2015	16%	< 0.5%	46%	< 0.5%	< 0.5%	27%	2%	Don't Know 5%
CBS News	343	6%	October 4–8, 2015	—	1%	56%	< 0.5%	1%	32%	2%	Don't Know 4%
Fairleigh Dickinson University	339	5.3%	October 1–5, 2015	17%	< 1%	45%	< 1%	1%	23%	1%	Other 1% Wouldn't Vote 3% Don't Know 7%
Public Policy Polling	551	4.2%	October 1–4, 2015	20%	1%	42%	0%	1%	24%	2%	Not Sure 9%
Google Consumer Surveys/IJ	1004	2%	September 30 – October 3, 2015	14.8%	1.3%	37.6%	—	1.3%	38.4%	1.3%	Elizabeth Warren 5.3%
IBD/TIPP	344	5%	September 26 – October 1, 2015	22%	—	42%	—	—	18%	—	
Centre College	229	6.3%	September 24 – October 1, 2015	17.8%	1.4%	31.3%	—	1.4%	30.4%	0.8%	Don't know 16.9%
USA Today/Suffolk	430	5%	September 24–28, 2015	20%	1%	41%	< 1%	0%	23%	< 1%	Other < 1% Undecided 14%
Pew Research Center	387	5.7%	September 22–27, 2015	8%	—	45%	—	—	24%	—	Other 2% Don't Know 21%
NBC/WSJ	256	6.1%	September 20–24, 2015	17%	0%	42%	—	0%	35%	1%	None 1% Other 4%
NBC/WSJ	256	6.1%	September 20–24, 2015	—	0%	53%	—	1%	38%	1%	None 2% Not sure 4% Other 1%
Reuters/Ipsos	618	4.5%	September 19–23, 2015	15%	0%	40%	—	2%	30%	0%	Andrew Cuomo 2% Kirsten Gillibrand 1% Wouldn't vote 10%
Fox News	381	5%	September 20–22, 2015	18%	0%	44%	< 1%	2%	30%	1%	None of the above 2% Don't know 3%
Bloomberg/Selzer	375	5.1%	September 18–21, 2015	25%	0%	33%	—	1%	24%	2%	Other 8% Undecided 7%
Quinnipiac	587	4%	September 17–21, 2015	18%	0%	43%	0%	0%	25%	0%	Someone else 2% Wouldn't vote 2% Don't know 10%
Morning Consult	955	?%	September 18–20, 2015	—	1%	49%	—	2%	28%	1%	Undecided 13%
Zogby Analytics	515	4.3%	September 18–19, 2015	—	—	52%	—	3%	24%	2%	Undecided 19%
CNN/ORC	392	5%	September 17–19, 2015	22%	0%	42%	—	1%	24%	0%	Someone else 2% No one 4% No opinion 2%
NBC/SurveyMonkey	1774	3.2%	September 16–18, 2015	15%	< 1%	41%	< 1%	1%	29%	1%	Other 3% Undecided 9%
Reuters/Ipsos	642	4.4%	September 12–16, 2015	18%	0%	46%	—	0%	25%	1%	Andrew Cuomo 1% Kirsten Gillibrand 1% Wouldn't vote 8%
YouGov/Economist	651	?%	September 11–15, 2015	19%	1%	45%	—	1%	26%	1%	Undecided 6% Other 1%
Morning Consult	955	?%	September 11–13, 2015	—	0%	54%	—	2%	24%	2%	Don't know/No opinion 12% Someone else 6%
CBS News/New York Times	351	6%	September 9–13, 2015	15%	1%	47%	—	0%	27%	1%	Don't know 7%
Reuters/Ipsos	668	4.4%	September 7–11, 2015	16%	1%	39%	—	2%	31%	0%	Andrew Cuomo 2% Kirsten Gillibrand 1% Wouldn't vote 9%
ABC News/Washington Post	356	?%	September 7–10, 2015	21%	1%	42%	—	2%	24%	1%	None of these 5% No opinion 3% Would not vote 1% Other 1%
Reuters/Ipsos	625	4.4%	September 5–9, 2015	14%	1%	42%	—	3%	28%	—	Andrew Cuomo 2% Wouldn't vote 10%
Emerson College Polling	392	4.9%	September 5–8, 2015	21%	—	48%	—	1%	21%	1%	Undecided 7% Other 2%
CNN/ORC	259	5%	September 4–8, 2015	20%	—	37%	—	3%	27%	2%	No one 4% No opinion 1%
Monmouth University	339	5.3%	August 31 – September 2, 2015	22%	0%	42%	—	1%	20%	1%	Other 0% No one 4% Undecided 10%
Public Policy Polling	545	4.2%	August 28–30, 2015	—	1%	55%	1%	4%	20%	3%	Undecided 15%
Morning Consult	913	?	August 28–30, 2015	—	1%	52%	—	1%	23%	2%	Other 8% Undecided 14%
Rasmussen Reports	536	4%	August 23–24, 2015	—	2%	50%	—	2%	24%	2%	Other 10% Undecided 10%
Reuters/Ipsos	356	5.9%	August 15–19, 2015	12%	1%	47%	—	1%	23%	1%	Andrew Cuomo 4% Kirsten Gillibrand 1% Wouldn't vote 11%
Reuters/Ipsos	356	5.9%	August 15–19, 2015	17%	—	48%	—	—	29%	—	Wouldn't vote 6%
Morning Consult	884	3.3%	August 14–16, 2015	—	1%	50%	—	3%	24%	1%	Other/Don't Know 21%
CNN/ORC	358	5.0%	August 13–16, 2015	14%	0%	47%	—	2%	29%	1%	Someone else 4% None/No one 3% No opinion 0%
Fox News	401	4.5%	August 11–13, 2015	10%	0%	49%	—	1%	30%	1%	Other 1% None of the above 3% Don't know 4%
Morning Consult	896	?	August 7–9, 2015	—	1%	56%	—	4%	19%	2%	Other 6% Undecided 12%
Reuters/Ipsos	404	5.5%	August 1–5, 2015	14%	1%	52%	—	1%	17%	1%	Andrew Cuomo 3% Kirsten Gillibrand 0% Wouldn't vote 11%
Zogby (Internet)/ University of Akron	459	4.7%	August 3–4, 2015	21%	—	48%	—	3%	15%	2%	Undecided 10%
Economist/YouGov	499	4%	July 31 – August 4, 2015	13%	1%	51%	—	1%	21%	2%	No preference 10%
Morning Consult	860	?	July 31 – August 3, 2015	—	1%	60%	—	2%	16%	2%	Other 6% Undecided 13%
Fox News	499	4%	July 30 – August 2, 2015	13%	1%	51%	—	1%	22%	1%	Other 1% None of the above 3% Don't know 6%
Monmouth University	429	4.7%	July 30 – August 2, 2015	12%	0%	52%	—	2%	16%	2%	Other 2% No one 3% Undecided 11%
CBS News	362	5.3%	July 29 – August 2, 2015	11%	1%	58%	—	1%	17%	2%	None of them 4% Don't know/No answer 7%
NBC/WSJ	253	6.16%	July 26–30, 2015	–	1%	59%	—	3%	25%	3%	Other 1% None 4% Not sure 4%
Gravis Marketing/One America News	803	2.5%	July 29, 2015	8%	2%	55%	—	3%	18%	5%	Elizabeth Warren 9%
Emerson College Polling	481	4.4%	July 26–28, 2015	9%	1%	54%	—	2%	33%	1%	Other 1%
Reuters/Ipsos	505	4.9%	July 25–29, 2015	12%	0%	58%	—	1%	15%	1%	Andrew Cuomo 3% Kirsten Gillibrand 1% Wouldn't vote 9%
Quinnipiac	681	3.8%	July 23–28, 2015	13%	0%	55%	—	1%	17%	1%	Someone else 1% Wouldn't vote 1% DK/NA 11%
CNN/ORC	392	5.0%	July 22–25, 2015	15%	0%	56%	—	0%	19%	1%	Someone else 4% None/No one 3% No opinion 1%
Reuters/Ipsos	406	5.5%	July 18–22, 2015	10%	2%	51%	—	1%	18%	5%	Andrew Cuomo 5% Kirsten Gillibrand 1% Wouldn't vote 8%
Public Policy Polling	496	4.4%	July 20–21, 2015	–	3%	57%	—	2%	22%	5%	Not sure 12%
ABC News/Washington Post	357	4.0%	July 16–19, 2015	12%	0%	63%	—	1%	14%	2%	Other 2% None of these 3% Would not vote 1% No opinion 2%
Fox News	382		July 13–15, 2015	8%	1%	59%	—	1%	19%	1%	Other 1% None of the above 4% Don't know 5%
Reuters/Ipsos	381	5.7%	July 11–15, 2015	10%	1%	51%	—	2%	16%	3%	Andrew Cuomo 4% Kirsten Gillibrand 2% Wouldn't vote 12%
USA Today/Suffolk	434	?	July 9–12, 2015	8%	0%	59%	—	0%	14%	2%	
Monmouth University	357	5.2%	July 9–12, 2015	13%	0%	51%	—	1%	17%	1%	Other 0% No one 2% Undecided 15%
Reuters/Ipsos	504	5.1%	July 4–8, 2015	8%	1%	52%	—	3%	21%	1%	Andrew Cuomo 3% Kirsten Gillibrand 3% Wouldn't vote 8%
The Economist/ YouGov	309		July 4–6, 2015	8%	0%	55%	—	0%	24%	1%	Other 4% No preference 8%
The Economist/ YouGov	309		July 4–6, 2015	—	—	64%	—	—	29%	—	Not sure 4% I would not vote 3%
Reuters/Ipsos	540	4.8%	June 27 – July 1, 2015	11%	3%	49%	—	1%	20%	2%	Andrew Cuomo 4% Kirsten Gillibrand 2% Wouldn't vote 8%
The Economist/ YouGov	348		June 27–29, 2015	9%	0%	59%	—	2%	19%	1%	Other 1% No preference 9%
CNN/ORC	490	4.5%	June 26–28, 2015	16%	0%	57%	—	1%	14%	2%	Someone else 4% None/No one 5% No opinion 1%
Fox News	375		June 21–23, 2015	11%	0%	61%	—	1%	15%	2%	Andrew Cuomo 3% Other 1% None of the above 2% Don't know 5%
Fairleigh Dickinson University	345	5.5%	June 15–21, 2015	—	0%	63%	—	3%	15%	—	Other 1% Wouldn't Vote 3% Don't Know 14%
NBC News/Wall Street Journal	247	6.24%	June 14–18, 2015	—	0%	75%	—	2%	15%	4%	Other 1% None 2% Not Sure 1%
Public Policy Polling	471	4.5%	June 11–14, 2015	—	4%	65%	—	5%	9%	4%	Not Sure 12%
Monmouth University	350	5.2%	June 11–14, 2015	12%	0%	57%	—	1%	12%	2%	Other 0% No one 2% Undecided 14%
Reuters/Ipsos	1628	± 2.8%	Jun 6–10, 2015	13%	2%	49%	—	4%	16%	2%	Andrew Cuomo 3% Kirsten Gillibrand 2% Wouldn't vote 10%
Reuters/Ipsos	1628	± 2.8%	Jun 6–10, 2015	19%	—	53%	—	—	22%	—	Wouldn't vote 7%
Fox News	1006	?	May 31 – June 2, 2015	8%	1%	57%	—	4%	11%	2%	Elizabeth Warren 7% Andrew Cuomo 1% Other 1% None of the above 2% Don't know 6%
CNN/ORC	433	± 4.5%	May 29–31, 2015	14%	0%	60%	—	3%	10%	1%	Someone else 7% None/No one 5% No Opinion 1%
ABC/Washington Post	1001	± 3.6%	May 28–31, 2015	14%	1%	62%	—	2%	10%	2%	Other 2% None of these 3% Would not vote 1% No Opinion 2%
Quinnipiac University	748	± 3.6%	May 19–26, 2015	9%	1%	57%	—	1%	15%	1%	Someone else 1% Wouldn't vote 2% Don't know 14%
Fox News	370	± 5%	May 9–12, 2015	6%	0%	63%	—	0%	6%	2%	Elizabeth Warren 13% Andrew Cuomo 2% Other 1% None of the above 2% Don't know 6%
The Economist/ YouGov	314	± 4.6%	May 9–11, 2015	7%	—	64%	—	0%	16%	1%	Other 4% No preference 8%
The Economist/ YouGov	314	± 4.6%	May 9–11, 2015	—	—	71%	—	—	19%	—	Not Sure 7% I would not vote 2%
Public Policy Polling	600	± 4%	May 7–10, 2015	—	5%	63%	—	2%	13%	6%	Not sure 11%
The Economist/ YouGov	329	± 4.2%	May 2–4, 2015	13%	—	58%	—	2%	17%	0%	Other 2% No preference 8%
The Economist/ YouGov	329	± 4.2%	May 2–4, 2015	—	—	68%	—	—	20%	—	Not Sure 10% I would not vote 2%
The Economist/ YouGov	329	± 4.1%	April 25–27, 2015	7%	—	59%	—	2%	10%	1%	Other 7% No preference 15%
Fox News	388	± 5%	April 19–21, 2015	9%	0%	62%	—	1%	4%	0%	Elizabeth Warren 12% Andrew Cuomo 3% Other 0% None of the above 4% Undecided 5%
Fox News	388	± 5%	April 19–21, 2015	36%	1%	—	—	4%	4%	1%	Elizabeth Warren 24% Andrew Cuomo 7% Other 0% None of the above 13% Undecided 11%
Quinnipiac University	469	± 4.1%	April 16–21, 2015	10%	0%	60%	—	3%	8%	1%	Other 0% Wouldn't vote 3% Undecided 14%
Quinnipiac University	469	± 4.1%	April 16–21, 2015	40%	1%	—	—	8%	11%	4%	Other 1% Wouldn't vote 5% Undecided 30%
CNN/ORC	458	± 4.5%	April 16–19, 2015	11%	1%	69%	—	1%	5%	3%	Other 5% None/No one 3% No opinion 2%

Poll source	Sample size	Margin of error	Date(s) administered	Joe; Biden	Hillary; Clinton	Andrew; Cuomo	Martin; O'Malley	Bernie; Sanders	Elizabeth; Warren	Jim; Webb	Others
Monmouth University	356	± 5.2%	March 30 – April 2, 2015	16%	60%	—	2%	7%	—	1%	Other 0% No one 2% Undecided 12%
Monmouth University	356	± 5.2%	March 30 – April 2, 2015	34%	—	4%	4%	8%	18%	3%	Cory Booker, Deval Patrick 3% Kirsten Gillibrand 2% Joe Manchin, Terry McAuliffe 1% Brian Schweitzer 0% Other 0% No one 1% Undecided 18%
Fox News	397	± 5%	March 29–31, 2015	12%	61%	3%	2%	3%	11%	1%	Other 1% None of the above 3% Don't know 3%
Fox News	397	± 5%	March 29–31, 2015	42%	—	9%	4%	3%	22%	3%	Other 1% None of the above 8% Don't know 8%
Public Policy Polling	449	± 4.6%	March 26–31, 2015	7%	54%	—	3%	6%	14%	2%	Other/Undecided 13%
ABC News/Washington Post	?	± 6%	March 26–29, 2015	12%	66%	—	< 0.5%	5%	12%	1%	Other/ None of these/ Wouldn't vote/ No opinion 3.5%
CNN/ORC	466	± 4.5%	March 13–15, 2015	15%	62%	—	1%	3%	10%	1%	Other 6% None/No one 2% No opinion 1%
CNN/ORC	466	± 4.5%	March 13–15, 2015	16%	67%	—	1%	5%	—	1%	Other 6% None/No one 2% No opinion 1%
Rasmussen Reports	?	± ?	March 8–9, 2015	30%	—	—	2%	7%	31%	6%	Undecided 13%
McClatchy-Marist	462	± 4.6%	March 1–4, 2015	13%	60%	—	1%	5%	12%	1%	Undecided 9%
Quinnipiac University	493	± 4.4%	February 26 – March 2, 2015	10%	56%	—	0%	4%	14%	1%	Other 1% Wouldn't vote 1% Undecided 14%
Quinnipiac University	493	± 4.4%	February 26 – March 2, 2015	35%	—	—	1%	7%	25%	3%	Other 1% Wouldn't vote 2% Undecided 25%
Public Policy Polling	310	± 5.6%	February 20–22, 2015	16%	54%	—	1%	5%	12%	2%	Other/Undecided 10%
CNN/ORC	475	± 4.5%	February 12–15, 2015	15%	60%	—	1%	3%	12%	2%	Other 4% None/No one 2% No opinion 1%
Fox News	390	± 5%	January 25–27, 2015	17%	55%	4%	2%	3%	12%	1%	Other 0% None of the above 2% Undecided 3%
Fox News	390	± 5%	January 25–27, 2015	37%	—	14%	4%	5%	21%	1%	Other 0% None of the above 10% Undecided 7%
Public Policy Polling	386	± 5%	January 22–25, 2015	15%	60%	—	1%	2%	10%	1%	Other/Undecided 11%
Rasmussen Reports	648	± 4%	January 18–19, 2015	6%	59%	—	2%	4%	12%	3%	Other 5% Undecided 9%
The Economist/ YouGov	353	± ?	January 10–12, 2015	7%	61%	—	0%	3%	17%	2%	Brian Schweitzer 1% Other 0% No preference 9%

=== Polls conducted in 2014 ===
Polls in 2014

Poll source	Sample size	Margin of error	Date(s) administered	Joe; Biden	Hillary; Clinton	Andrew; Cuomo	Martin; O'Malley	Bernie; Sanders	Elizabeth; Warren	Jim; Webb	Others
CNN/ORC	469	± 4.5%	December 18–21, 2014	8%	66%	1%	1%	3%	9%	1%	Deval Patrick 0% Other 6% None/No one 2% No opinion 2%
ABC News/Washington Post	346	± 6%	December 11–14, 2014	14%	61%	—	0%	4%	13%	3%	None of these 1% Wouldn't vote 1% No opinion 2%
Monmouth University	386	± 5%	December 10–14, 2014	2%	48%	1%	—	2%	6%	—	Other 1% No-one/No Democrat 7% Undecided 32%
Fox News	409	± 5%	December 7–9, 2014	10%	62%	2%	1%	3%	12%	1%	None of the above 5% Undecided 5%
McClatchy-Marist	429	± 4.7%	December 3–9, 2014	11%	62%	—	1%	4%	9%	1%	Undecided 11%
CNN/ORC	457	± 4.5%	November 21–23, 2014	9%	65%	1%	0%	5%	10%	1%	Deval Patrick 1% Other 4% None/No one 3% No opinion 1%
CNN/ORC	457	± 4.5%	November 21–23, 2014	41%	—	7%	4%	7%	20%	3%	Deval Patrick 2% Other 5% None/No one 8% No opinion 4%
Quinnipiac University	610	± 4%	November 18–23, 2014	9%	57%	—	1%	4%	13%	1%	Other 1% Wouldn't vote 1% Undecided 14%
Quinnipiac University	610	± 4%	November 18–23, 2014	34%	—	—	2%	6%	25%	2%	Other 2% Wouldn't vote 1% Undecided 28%
Rasmussen Reports	?	± ?	November 20–21, 2014	7%	62%	—	2%	—	17%	2%	Other/Undecided 10%
ABC News/Washington Post	?	± ?	October 9–12, 2014	13%	64%	—	1%	1%	11%	2%	None of these 3% No opinion 5%
McClatchy-Marist	408	± 4.9%	September 24–29, 2014	15%	64%	—	2%	4%	8%	1%	Undecided 6%
Fox News	438	± 4.5%	July 20–22, 2014	12%	64%	5%	1%	—	9%	—	Other 0% None of the above 4% Don't know 4%
CNN/ORC	449	± 4.5%	July 18–20, 2014	8%	67%	4%	2%	—	10%	—	Other 6% None/No one 2% No opinion 1%
Quinnipiac	610	± 4%	June 24–30, 2014	9%	58%	4%	1%	—	11%	—	Brian Schweitzer 1% Other 1% Wouldn't vote 1% Don't know 15%
Saint Leo University	286	± ?	May 28 – June 4, 2014	8%	61%	4%	1%	0%	5%	—	Cory Booker, Kirsten Gillibrand, John Hickenlooper, Deval Patrick 2% Mark Warner 1% Amy Klobuchar, Brian Schweitzer 0% Other 3% Don't know/Not sure 9%
ABC News/Washington Post	380	± 6%	May 29 – June 1, 2014	12%	69%	2%	2%	2%	7%	1%	Brian Schweitzer 1% Other 0% None of these 2% No opinion 2%
CNN/ORC	481	± 4.5%	May 29 – June 1, 2014	—	63%	—	—	—	—	—	More conservative Democrat 20% More liberal Democrat 11% No opinion 6%
CNN/ORC	466	± 4.5%	May 2–4, 2014	—	64%	—	—	—	—	—	More conservative Democrat 19% More liberal Democrat 13% No opinion 5%
Fox News	395	± 5%	April 13–15, 2014	14%	69%	2%	1%	—	6%	—	None of the above 4% Don't know 3%

Poll source	Sample size	Margin of error	Date(s) administered	Joe; Biden	Cory; Booker	Hillary; Clinton	Andrew; Cuomo	Kirsten; Gillibrand	Martin; O'Malley	Brian; Schweitzer	Mark; Warner	Elizabeth; Warren	Others
CNN/ORC	801	± 5%	March 7–9, 2014	13%	—	64%	4%	—	4%	3%	—	—	Other 6% None/No one 5% No opinion 1%
Public Policy Polling	429	± 4.7%	March 6–9, 2014	11%	3%	66%	3%	1%	2%	1%	0%	5%	Other/Not Sure 7%
Public Policy Polling	429	± 4.7%	March 6–9, 2014	37%	5%	—	10%	4%	3%	1%	1%	12%	Other/Not Sure 27%
Public Policy Polling	429	± 4.7%	March 6–9, 2014	—	12%	—	19%	6%	4%	1%	3%	19%	Other/Not Sure 37%
CNN/ORC	334	± 5.4%	January 31 – February 2, 2014	—	—	70%	—	—	—	—	—	—	More conservative Democrat 15% More liberal Democrat 10% No opinion 5%
Public Policy Polling	334	± 5.4%	January 23–26, 2014	7%	2%	67%	2%	1%	1%	1%	1%	7%	Other/Not Sure 10%
Public Policy Polling	334	± 5.4%	January 23–26, 2014	32%	7%	—	7%	3%	1%	2%	2%	16%	Other/Not Sure 31%
Public Policy Polling	334	± 5.4%	January 23–26, 2014	—	11%	—	13%	4%	2%	3%	1%	24%	Other/Not Sure 43%
Washington Post-ABC News	455	± 3%	January 20–23, 2014	12%	—	73%	—	—	—	—	—	8%	Other 1% None/no one 2% No opinion 3%
Quinnipiac	803	± 3.5%	January 15–19, 2014	8%	—	65%	3%	—	1%	1%	—	7%	Howard Dean 2% Other 1% Don't know 13%

=== Polls conducted in 2013 ===
Polls in 2013

Poll source	Sample size	Margin of error	Date(s) administered	Joe; Biden	Cory; Booker	Hillary; Clinton	Andrew; Cuomo	Kirsten; Gillibrand	Martin; O'Malley	Brian; Schweitzer	Mark; Warner	Elizabeth; Warren	Others
Fox News	412	± 5%	December 14–16, 2013	12%	—	68%	4%	—	1%	—	—	7%	Deval Patrick 1% None of the above 2% Don't know 6%
Public Policy Polling	453	± ?%	December 12–15, 2013	10%	2%	66%	2%	—	2%	1%	—	6%	Howard Dean 2% John Kerry 2% Other/Not Sure 7%
Public Policy Polling	453	± ?%	December 12–15, 2013	35%	7%	—	7%	—	4%	1%	—	13%	John Kerry 13% Howard Dean 4% Other/Not Sure 16%
Public Policy Polling	453	± ?%	December 12–15, 2013	—	13%	—	14%	—	7%	2%	—	24%	Other/Not Sure 40%
Fairleigh Dickinson University	412	± ?%	December 9–15, 2013	5%	—	63%	1%	—	—	—	—	9%	Other 11% Don't know 11%
Quinnipiac	1095	± 3%	December 3–9, 2013	8%	—	66%	3%	—	0%	1%	—	7%	Howard Dean 1% Other 1% Wouldn't vote 1% Don't know 12%
McClatchy-Marist	466	± 4.5%	December 3–5, 2013	12%	—	65%	3%	—	1%	—	—	9%	Undecided 9%
McClatchy-Marist	466	± 4.5%	December 3–5, 2013	45%	—	—	11%	—	4%	—	—	25%	Undecided 15%
CNN/ORC	374	± 5%	November 18–20, 2013	12%	—	63%	5%	—	2%	—	—	7%	Other 6% None/No one 3% No opinion 3%
CNN/ORC	374	± 5%	November 18–20, 2013	43%	—	—	15%	—	6%	—	—	17%	Other 8% None/No one 7% No opinion 4%
NBC News	428	± 5.5%	November 7–10, 2013	—	—	66%	—	—	—	—	—	—	Another Democrat 14% Wouldn't vote 2% Don't know 18%
Rasmussen	?	± ?	November 7–8, 2013	10%	—	70%	3%	—	—	—	—	—	Don't know 17%
Public Policy Polling	400	± 4.9%	October 29–31, 2013	12%	1%	67%	2%	0%	2%	0%	1%	4%	Other/Not Sure 12%
Public Policy Polling	400	± 4.9%	October 29–31, 2013	27%	6%	—	6%	4%	3%	1%	1%	19%	Other/Not Sure 33%
Public Policy Polling	400	± 4.9%	October 29–31, 2013	—	14%	—	13%	3%	4%	1%	2%	23%	Other/Not Sure 39%
Quinnipiac			September 23–29, 2013	11%	—	61%	2%	—	0%	—	1%	7%	Don't know 17%
Rasmussen		± ?%	September 16–17, 2013	11%	—	77%	—	—	—	—	—	—	Other 6% Undecided 6%
CNN/ORC	448	± 4.5%	September 6–8, 2013	10%	—	65%	6%	—	2%	—	—	7%	Other 4% None/No one 5% No opinion 2%
Rasmussen	1000	± 3%	August 1–2, 2013	12%	5%	63%	< 5%	—	—	—	—	—	Deval Patrick < 5% Antonio Villaraigosa < 5% Unsure ≈5%
Public Policy Polling	418	± 4.7%	July 19–21, 2013	12%	3%	52%	2%	5%	1%	2%	1%	6%	Other/Not Sure 17%
Public Policy Polling	418	± 4.7%	July 19–21, 2013	34%	4%	—	10%	3%	3%	2%	2%	13%	Other/Not Sure 29%
Public Policy Polling	418	± 4.7%	July 19–21, 2013	—	8%	—	11%	5%	2%	4%	3%	20%	Other/Not Sure 47%
McClatchy-Marist	426	± 4.7%	July 15–18, 2013	13%	—	63%	6%	—	1%	—	—	—	Unsure 18%

Poll source	Sample size	Margin of error	Date(s) administered	Joe; Biden	Hillary; Clinton	Andrew; Cuomo	Kirsten; Gillibrand	Martin; O'Malley	Deval; Patrick	Brian; Schweitzer	Mark; Warner	Elizabeth; Warren	Others
Public Policy Polling	589	± 4%	May 6–9, 2013	13%	63%	4%	1%	2%	1%	1%	3%	3%	Other/Not Sure 10%
Public Policy Polling	589	± 4%	May 6–9, 2013	38%	—	13%	2%	3%	3%	1%	3%	10%	Other/Not Sure 26%
Public Policy Polling	589	± 4%	May 6–9, 2013	—	—	25%	5%	5%	6%	1%	4%	17%	Other/Not Sure 38%
Quinnipiac	650	± 3.8%	April 25–29, 2013	13%	65%	4%	—	1%	1%	—	1%	—	Other 1% Not sure 14%
Quinnipiac	650	± 3.8%	April 25–29, 2013	45%	—	15%	—	3%	6%	—	2%	—	Other 1% Not sure 28%
Fairleigh Dickinson University	373	± 5.1%	April 22–28, 2013	12%	63%	3%	—	—	—	—	—	—	Other 12% Not sure 11%
Public Policy Polling	666	± 3.8%	March 27–30, 2013	18%	64%	3%	1%	1%	1%	1%	2%	5%	Other/Not Sure 6%
Public Policy Polling	666	± 3.8%	March 27–30, 2013	49%	—	10%	7%	1%	2%	2%	3%	11%	Other/Not Sure 15%
Public Policy Polling	666	± 3.8%	March 27–30, 2013	—	—	22%	5%	8%	4%	1%	5%	18%	Other/Not Sure 36%
Public Policy Polling	416	± 4.8%	January 31 – February 3, 2013	19%	58%	3%	1%	1%	0%	0%	1%	8%	Other/Not Sure 9%
Public Policy Polling	416	± 4.8%	January 31 – February 3, 2013	57%	—	5%	4%	1%	2%	0%	3%	13%	Other/Not Sure 14%
Public Policy Polling	416	± 4.8%	January 31 – February 3, 2013	—	—	25%	3%	5%	3%	2%	4%	21%	Other/Not Sure 36%
Public Policy Polling	400	± 4.9%	January 3–6, 2013	16%	57%	4%	1%	3%	2%	1%	2%	4%	Other/Not Sure 10%
Public Policy Polling	400	± 4.9%	January 3–6, 2013	—	—	19%	5%	7%	6%	2%	4%	16%	Other/Not Sure 40%

== See also ==
General election polling

- Nationwide opinion polling for the United States presidential election, 2016
- Nationwide opinion polling for the United States presidential election by demographics, 2016
- Statewide opinion polling for the United States presidential election, 2016

Democratic primary polling

- Statewide opinion polling for the Democratic Party presidential primaries, 2016

Republican primary polling

- Nationwide opinion polling for the Republican Party 2016 presidential primaries
- Statewide opinion polling for the Republican Party presidential primaries, 2016
