= Statewide opinion polling for the 2016 Republican Party presidential primaries =

Key: Ted Cruz 3 states + 3 shared John Kasich 1 state Donald Trump 32 states + 3 shared 3 or more candidates statistically tied for the lead 1 state No polling data in the past three months or three months before the election 10 states & D.C. Note: This map reflects the latest opinion polling results, NOT the final actual result of the primaries/caucuses themselves. A map of the primaries' results is located at File:Republican Party presidential primaries results, 2016.svg. Please note that some states have polls with margins of error that may not be reflected accurately on this map.

This article contains opinion polling by U.S. state for the 2016 Republican Party presidential primaries. The shading for each poll indicates the candidate(s) which are within one margin of error of the poll's leader.

For the significance of the earliest state votes, the Iowa caucuses and the New Hampshire primary, see United States presidential primary – Iowa and New Hampshire. For when any given state votes, see Republican Party presidential primaries, 2016 – Schedule of primaries and caucuses.

== Alabama ==
Winner: Donald Trump
Primary date: March 1, 2016

Poll source	Date	1st	2nd	3rd	Other
Primary results	March 1, 2016	Donald Trump; 43.42%	Ted Cruz; 21.09%	Marco Rubio; 18.66%	Ben Carson 10.24%, John Kasich 4.43%, Jeb Bush 0.46%, Mike Huckabee 0.30%, Rand Paul 0.22%, Chris Christie 0.10%, Rick Santorum 0.07%, Carly Fiorina 0.06%, Lindsey Graham 0.03%
SurveyMonkey Margin of error: ± ?% Sample size: 741	February 22–29, 2016	Donald Trump; 47%	Ted Cruz; 18%	Marco Rubio; 14%	Ben Carson 9%, John Kasich 3%, Undecided 9%
Monmouth University Margin of error: ± 4.6% Sample size: 450	February 25–28, 2016	Donald Trump; 42%	Marco Rubio; 19%	Ted Cruz; 16%	Ben Carson 11%, John Kasich 5%, Undecided 7%
Opinion Savvy Margin of error: ± 4.6% Sample size: 460	February 25–26, 2016	Donald Trump; 35.8%	Marco Rubio; 23.0%	Ted Cruz; 16.2%	Ben Carson 10.5%, John Kasich 7.5%, Undecided 7.0%
AL.com Margin of error: ± 4.5% Sample size: 500	December 10–13, 2015	Donald Trump; 35%	Ted Cruz; 15%	Marco Rubio; 12%	Ben Carson 12%, Jeb Bush 4%, Mike Huckabee 4%, Chris Christie 3%, John Kasich 2%, Carly Fiorina 1%, Rand Paul <1%, Rick Santorum <1%, Lindsey Graham <1%
Gravis Marketing Margin of error: ± 2% Sample size: 1616	September 3, 2015	Donald Trump; 38%	Ben Carson; 16.7%	Jeb Bush; 4.9%	Ted Cruz 4.1%, Mike Huckabee 2.7%, Marco Rubio 2.3%, Carly Fiorina 2.3%, Rand Paul 1.5%, John Kasich 1.3%, Scott Walker 1.1%, Chris Christie 0.9%, Rick Santorum 0.4%, Rick Perry 0.3%, Bobby Jindal 0.3%, Lindsey Graham 0.1%, unsure 23.2%
News-5/Strategy Research Margin of error: ± 2% Sample size: 3500	August 11, 2015	Donald Trump; 30%	Jeb Bush; 15%	Ben Carson; 11%	Marco Rubio 11%, Mike Huckabee 8%, Carly Fiorina 8%, Ted Cruz 7.5%, Scott Walker 3%, Other 5%
Opinion Savvy/Insider Advantage Margin of error: ± 4.4% Sample size: 481	August 2–3, 2015	Donald Trump; 37.6%	Ben Carson; 14.6%	Jeb Bush; 11.8%	Mike Huckabee 7.9%, Ted Cruz 4.5%, Scott Walker 3.8%, Chris Christie 3.2%, Marco Rubio 2.6%, Rand Paul 2.2%, Bobby Jindal 2.0%, John Kasich 1.4%, Rick Santorum 1.2%, Rick Perry 1.0%, Lindsey Graham 0.7%, Carly Fiorina 0.5%, George Pataki 0.0%, Someone else 1.9%, Undecided 3.1%
Cygnal Margin of error: ± 3.42% Sample size: 821	July 7–8, 2014	Jeb Bush; 19.8%	Ben Carson; 12.6%	Rand Paul; 10.5%	Chris Christie 8.8%, Rick Perry 7.2%, Ted Cruz 5.6%, Rick Santorum 5.3%, Bobby Jindal 3.9%, Scott Walker 3.6%, Undecided 22.6%

== Alaska ==
Winner: Ted Cruz
Primary date: March 1, 2016

Poll source	Date	1st	2nd	3rd	Other
Caucus results	March 1, 2016	Ted Cruz; 36.37%	Donald Trump; 33.64%	Marco Rubio; 15.16%	Ben Carson 10.83%, John Kasich 3.99%, Other 0.01%
Alaska Dispatch News/Ivan Moore Research Margin of error: – Sample size: 651	January 23, 2016	Donald Trump; 27.9%	Ted Cruz; 23.8%	Ben Carson; 8.5%	Jeb Bush 7.3%, Marco Rubio 6.9%, Chris Christie 3.3%, Rand Paul 3.0%, John Kasich 1.7%, Other 4.1%, Undecided 13.4%
Public Policy Polling Margin of error: ± 5.3% Sample size: 337	July 31 – August 3, 2014	Ted Cruz; 16%	Rand Paul; 15%	Mike Huckabee; 14%	Chris Christie 12%, Jeb Bush 12%, Sarah Palin 11%, Scott Walker 7%, Paul Ryan 6%, Marco Rubio 5%, Someone else/Not sure 4%
Public Policy Polling Margin of error: ± 5.5% Sample size: 313	May 8–11, 2014	Ted Cruz; 15%	Jeb Bush; 14%	Chris Christie; 14%	Sarah Palin 12%, Rand Paul 11%, Mike Huckabee 11%, Paul Ryan 4%, Scott Walker 4%, Marco Rubio 3%, Someone else/Not sure 11%
Public Policy Polling Margin of error: ± 5.5% Sample size: 313	May 8–11, 2014	Chris Christie; 16%	Jeb Bush; 15%	Ted Cruz; 15%	Rand Paul 14%, Mike Huckabee 10%, Paul Ryan 5%, Scott Walker 5%, Marco Rubio 4%, Someone else/Not sure 16%
Magellan Strategies Margin of error: ± 7% Sample size: 190	April 14, 2014	Ted Cruz; 16%	Rand Paul; 15%	Jeb Bush; 13%	Mike Huckabee 12%, Chris Christie 11%, Marco Rubio 7%, Scott Walker 6%, John Kasich 1%, Undecided 19%
Public Policy Polling Margin of error: ± 4.7% Sample size: 442	January 30 – February 1, 2014	Rand Paul; 15%	Ted Cruz; 13%	Sarah Palin; 13%	Jeb Bush 12%, Mike Huckabee 11%, Chris Christie 10%, Marco Rubio 6%, Paul Ryan 4%, Scott Walker 4%, Someone Else/Undecided 12%
Public Policy Polling Margin of error: ± 4.7% Sample size: 442	January 30 – February 1, 2014	Ted Cruz; 16%	Jeb Bush; 14%	Rand Paul; 14%	Mike Huckabee 13%, Chris Christie 9%, Marco Rubio 8%, Paul Ryan 7%, Scott Walker 5%, Someone Else/Undecided 15%
Public Policy Polling Margin of error: ± 4.4% Sample size: 507	July 25–28, 2013	Rand Paul; 18%	Sarah Palin; 14%	Chris Christie; 13%	Jeb Bush 11%, Marco Rubio 9%, Paul Ryan 9%, Ted Cruz 8%, Rick Santorum 5%, George Zimmerman 2%, Someone Else/Undecided 12%
Public Policy Polling Margin of error: ± 4.4% Sample size: 507	July 25–28, 2013	Rand Paul; 20%	Jeb Bush; 15%	Chris Christie; 14%	Paul Ryan 14%, Marco Rubio 10%, Ted Cruz 9%, Rick Santorum 6%, Someone Else/Undecided 12%
Public Policy Polling Margin of error: ± 4.2% Sample size: 537	Feb. 4–5, 2013	Marco Rubio; 18%	Mike Huckabee; 14%	Rand Paul; 12%	Chris Christie 11%, Paul Ryan 10%, Jeb Bush 9%, Sarah Palin 9%, Bobby Jindal 6%, Rick Perry 1%, Someone Else/Undecided 10%

== Arizona ==
Winner: Donald Trump
Primary date: March 22, 2016

Poll source	Date	1st	2nd	3rd	Other
Primary results	March 22, 2016	Donald Trump; 45.95%	Ted Cruz; 27.61%	John Kasich; 11.59%	Ben Carson 2.39%, Jeb Bush 0.70%, Rand Paul 0.36%, Mike Huckabee 0.21%, Carly Fiorina 0.20%, Chris Christie 0.16%, Rick Santorum 0.08%, Lindsey Graham 0.08%, George Pataki 0.05%
Opinion Savvy/Fox 10 Margin of error: ± 4% Sample size: 607	March 20, 2016	Donald Trump; 45.8%	Ted Cruz; 33.3%	John Kasich; 17.1%	Unsure/Undecided 3.8%
Merrill/Westgroup Research Margin of error: ± 5.4% Sample size: 300	March 7–11, 2016	Donald Trump; 31%	Ted Cruz; 19%	John Kasich; 10%	Marco Rubio 10%, Unsure/Undecided 30%
MBQF Consulting Margin of error: ± 3.57% Sample size: 751	March 8, 2016	Donald Trump; 37.3%	Ted Cruz; 23.3%	John Kasich; 14.6%	Marco Rubio 11.6%, Unsure/Undecided 10.4%, Other 2.8%
MBQF Consulting Margin of error: ± 3.61% Sample size: 736	February 22, 2016	Donald Trump; 34.8%	Marco Rubio; 22.7%	Ted Cruz; 14.1%	Ben Carson 7.1%, Unsure/Undecided 21.3%
MBQF Consulting Margin of error: ± 3.53% Sample size: 771	January 19, 2016	Donald Trump; 38.6%	Ted Cruz; 15.6%	Marco Rubio; 11.4%	Ben Carson 7.1%, Jeb Bush 7.0%, Chris Christie 3.1%, Carly Fiorina 2.9%, John Kasich 2.9%, Mike Huckabee 1.4%, Rand Paul 0.4%, Unsure/undecided 10%
Behavior Research Center Margin of error: ± 6.7% Sample size: 226	October 24 – November 4, 2015	Ben Carson; 23%	Donald Trump; 21%	Marco Rubio; 15%	Jeb Bush 8%, Ted Cruz 5%, All others (Christie, Fiorina, Huckabee, Paul, Kasich) 6%, Not sure yet 22%
Silver Bullet LLC Margin of error: ± 3.77% Sample size: 677	August 3, 2015	Donald Trump; 33%	Jeb Bush; 17%	Scott Walker; 13%	Ben Carson 10%, Ted Cruz 5%, John Kasich 5%, Marco Rubio 4%, Mike Huckabee 2%, Chris Christie 1%, Carly Fiorina 1%, Rand Paul 1%, Rick Perry 0%, Lindsey Graham 0%, Bobby Jindal 0%, George Pataki 0%, Jim Gilmore 0%, Undecided/Refused 7%
MBQF Consulting Margin of error: ± 3.56; Sample size: 758	July 29, 2015	Donald Trump; 26.5%	Scott Walker 12.6%	Jeb Bush 12.1%	Ben Carson 8.7%, Ted Cruz 6%, Mike Huckabee 3.9%, Marco Rubio 3.9%, Rick Perry 2%, Rand Paul 1.7%, Chris Christie 1.7%, Undecided 21%
Public Policy Polling Margin of error: ± 5.7% Sample size: 300	May 1–3, 2015	Scott Walker; 16%	Jeb Bush; 14%	Marco Rubio; 14%	Ben Carson 11%, Rand Paul 11%, Ted Cruz 9%, Chris Christie 5%, Mike Huckabee 5%, Rick Perry 2%, Undecided 12%
Public Policy Polling Margin of error: ± 4.9% Sample size: 403	February 28 – March 2, 2014	Ted Cruz; 16%	Rand Paul; 14%	Chris Christie; 12%	Jeb Bush 11%, Mike Huckabee 11%, Paul Ryan 8%, Scott Walker 8%, Marco Rubio 4%, Bobby Jindal 2%, Other/Undecided 13%

== Arkansas ==
Winner: Donald Trump
Primary date: March 1, 2016

Poll source	Date	1st	2nd	3rd	Other
Primary results	March 1, 2016	Donald Trump; 32.79%	Ted Cruz; 30.50%	Marco Rubio; 24.80%	Ben Carson 5.72%, John Kasich 3.72%, Mike Huckabee 1.17%, Jeb Bush 0.58%, Rand Paul 0.28%, Chris Christie 0.15%, Carly Fiorina 0.10%, Rick Santorum 0.07%, Lindsey Graham 0.06%, Bobby Jindal 0.04%
SurveyMonkey Margin of error: ± ?% Sample size: 542	February 22–29, 2016	Donald Trump; 34%	Ted Cruz; 27%	Marco Rubio; 20%	Ben Carson 8%, John Kasich 4%, Undecided 6%
Talk Business/Hendrix Margin of error: ± ?% Sample size: 457	February 4, 2016	Ted Cruz; 27%	Marco Rubio; 23%	Donald Trump; 23%	Ben Carson 11%, Carly Fiorina 4%, John Kasich 4%, Jeb Bush 1%, Chris Christie 1%, Don't Know 6%
Opinion Savvy/Insider Advantage Margin of error: ± 4.7% Sample size: 428	August 2, 2015	Donald Trump; 25.5%	Mike Huckabee; 21.4%	Jeb Bush; 9.2%	Ted Cruz 8.7%, Ben Carson 8.2%, Scott Walker 4.2%, Rand Paul 3.8%, John Kasich 3.1%, Marco Rubio 2.9%, Chris Christie 2.4%, Rick Perry 1.5%, Carly Fiorina 1.3%, Bobby Jindal 1.3%, Lindsey Graham 0.7%, Rick Santorum 0.3%, George Pataki 0%, Someone else 2.2%, Undecided 3.2%
Suffolk University Margin of error: ± 7.5% Sample size: 171	September 20–23, 2014	Mike Huckabee; 39.27%	Rick Perry; 8.38%	Ted Cruz; 7.33%	Rand Paul 6.28%, Jeb Bush 4.71%, Chris Christie 4.71%, Marco Rubio 4.71%, Paul Ryan 3.14%, Bobby Jindal 2.62%, Rick Santorum 2.09%, Jon Huntsman Jr. 1.57%, Scott Walker 1.57%, John Kasich 1.05%, Other 2.09%, Undecided 10.47%
Suffolk University Margin of error: ± 7.5% Sample size: 171	September 20–23, 2014	Mitt Romney; 32.75%	Mike Huckabee; 29.24%	Ted Cruz; 6.43%	Rick Perry 6.43%, Chris Christie 2.92%, Rand Paul 2.92%, Paul Ryan 2.34%, Jon Huntsman Jr. 1.75%, Marco Rubio 1.75%, Jeb Bush 1.17%, Rick Santorum 0.58%, Scott Walker 0.58%, Bobby Jindal 0%, John Kasich 0% Undecided 11.11%
Public Policy Polling Margin of error: ± 4.5% Sample size: 479	August 1–3, 2014	Mike Huckabee; 33%	Ted Cruz; 12%	Jeb Bush; 10%	Chris Christie 8%, Rand Paul 7%, Scott Walker 6%, Bobby Jindal 5%, Marco Rubio 4%, Paul Ryan 3%, Someone else/Not sure 11%
Public Policy Polling Margin of error: ± 5.4% Sample size: 342	April 25–27, 2014	Mike Huckabee; 38%	Ted Cruz; 14%	Rand Paul; 13%	Jeb Bush 10%, Chris Christie 4%, Bobby Jindal 3%, Marco Rubio 3%, Paul Ryan 3%, Cliven Bundy 2%, Someone else/Not sure 10%
Magellan Strategies Margin of error: ± 3.35% Sample size: 857	April 14–15, 2014	Mike Huckabee; 57%	Rand Paul; 9%	Jeb Bush; 8%	Chris Christie 6%, Ted Cruz 6%, Marco Rubio 5%, John Kasich 2%, Scott Walker 1%, Undecided 7%

== California ==
Winner: Donald Trump
Primary date: June 7, 2016

Poll source	Date	1st	2nd	3rd	Other
Primary results	June 7, 2016	Donald Trump; 75.01%	John Kasich; 11.41%	Ted Cruz; 9.30%	Ben Carson 3.55%, Jim Gilmore 0.72%
Hoover/Golden State Poll Margin of error: ± % Sample size: 380	May 4–16, 2016	Donald Trump 66%	Ted Cruz; 11%	John Kasich; 7%	
SurveyUSA/KABC/SCNG Margin of error: ± 4.3% Sample size: 529	April 27–30, 2016	Donald Trump 54%	Ted Cruz; 20%	John Kasich; 16%	
Fox News Margin of error: ± 4.0% Sample size: 583	April 18–21, 2016	Donald Trump 49%	Ted Cruz; 22%	John Kasich; 20%	Undecided 7%, None 1%
CBS News/YouGov Margin of error: ± 4.8% Sample size: 1012	April 13–15, 2016	Donald Trump 49%	Ted Cruz; 31%	John Kasich; 16%	Undecided 4%
Sextant Strategies & Research/Capitol Weekly Margin of error: ± % Sample size: 1165	April 11–14, 2016	Donald Trump 41%	Ted Cruz; 23%	John Kasich; 21%	Undecided 15%
Field Margin of error: ± 4.0% Sample size: 558	March 24–April 4, 2016	Donald Trump 39%	Ted Cruz; 32%	John Kasich; 18%	Other/Undecided 11%
SurveyUSA Margin of error: ± 5.3% Sample size: 356	March 30–April 3, 2016	Donald Trump 40%	Ted Cruz; 32%	John Kasich; 17%	Undecided 12%
USC/Los Angeles Times Margin of error: ± 5.5% Sample size: 391	March 16–23, 2016	Donald Trump 36%	Ted Cruz; 35%	John Kasich; 14%	
Public Policy Institute of California Margin of error: ± 7.3% Sample size: 321	March 6–15, 2016	Donald Trump 38%	Ted Cruz; 27%	John Kasich; 14%	Other 11%, Don't Know 9%
Nson Margin of error: ± 4.9% Sample size: 407	March 9–10, 2016	Donald Trump 38%	Ted Cruz; 22%	John Kasich; 20%	Marco Rubio 10%, Other/Undecided 10%
Smith Johnson Research Margin of error: ± 4% Sample size: 454	March 7–9, 2016	Donald Trump 24.9%	Ted Cruz; 19.6%	Marco Rubio; 17.6%	John Kasich 15.4%, Undecided 22.5%
Field Margin of error: ± 5.6% Sample size: 325	December 16, 2015– January 3, 2016	Ted Cruz; 25%	Donald Trump; 23%	Marco Rubio 13%	Ben Carson 9%, Rand Paul 6%, Jeb Bush 4%, Carly Fiorina 3%, Chris Christie 3%, John Kasich 1%, Other/Undecided 13%
USC/LA Times/SurveyMonkey Margin of error: ± 3.0% Sample size: 674	October 29 – November 3, 2015	Donald Trump; 20%	Ben Carson; 19%	Marco Rubio 14%	Ted Cruz 11%, Carly Fiorina 6%, Jeb Bush 4%, Rand Paul 3%, Chris Christie 2%, Mike Huckabee 1%, Lindsey Graham 1%, John Kasich 1%, Rick Santorum 1%, George Pataki 0%, Bobby Jindal 0%, Undecided 14%
Field Poll Margin of error: ± 7.0% Sample size: 214	September 17 – October 4, 2015	Donald Trump; 17%	Ben Carson; 15%	Carly Fiorina 13%	Marco Rubio 10%, Jeb Bush 8%, Ted Cruz 6%, Rand Paul 5%, Mike Huckabee 3%, Chris Christie 2%, John Kasich 2%, Rick Santorum 1%, George Pataki 1%, Lindsey Graham 1%, Bobby Jindal 0%, Others 3%, undecided 13%
LA Times/USC Margin of error: ± 5.3% Sample size: 422	Aug 29 – Sep 8, 2015	Donald Trump; 24%	Ben Carson; 18%	Ted Cruz 6%	Jeb Bush 6%, Marco Rubio 5%, Carly Fiorina 5%, Mike Huckabee 2%, Scott Walker 2%, John Kasich 2%, Rand Paul 2%, Chris Christie 1%, Rick Santorum 1%, Rick Perry 1%, Others 3%, undecided 20%
Field Poll Margin of error: ± 7.0% Sample size: 227	April 23 – May 16, 2015	Jeb Bush; 11%	Marco Rubio; 11%	Scott Walker; 10%	Rand Paul 8%, Mike Huckabee 6%, Chris Christie 6%, Ben Carson 5%, Ted Cruz 4%, Carly Fiorina 3%, Bobby Jindal 1%, John Kasich 1%, Lindsey Graham 1%, Rick Perry 0%, Other 2%, Undecided 31%
Emerson College Margin of error: ± ? Sample size: 358	April 2–8, 2015	Jeb Bush; 17%	Scott Walker; 17%	Ben Carson; 15%	Ted Cruz 11%, Rand Paul 8%, Mike Huckabee 6%, Chris Christie 5%, Undecided 20%
Field Poll Margin of error: ± 5.4% Sample size: 237	January 26 – February 16, 2015	Scott Walker; 18%	Jeb Bush; 16%	Rand Paul; 10%	Ben Carson 8%, Marco Rubio 7%, Ted Cruz 5%, Mike Huckabee 5%, Rick Perry 4%, Chris Christie 3%, Lindsey Graham 1%, Bobby Jindal 1%, Other 3%, Undecided 19%

== Colorado ==
Winner: Ted Cruz
Primary date: June 7, 2016

Poll source	Date	1st	2nd	3rd	Other
Quinnipiac University Margin of error: ± 4.5% Sample size: 474	November 11–15, 2015	Ben Carson; 25%	Marco Rubio; 19%	Donald Trump; 17%	Ted Cruz 14%, Carly Fiorina 5%, Rand Paul 3%, Jeb Bush 2%, Chris Christie 1%, John Kasich 1%, Mike Huckabee 1%, Bobby Jindal 1%, Lindsey Graham 0%, Rick Santorum 0%, George Pataki 0%, Jim Gilmore 0%, DK/NA 11%
Suffolk University Margin of error: ± ?% Sample size: 205	September 2014	Rand Paul; 12.25%	Paul Ryan; 10.29%	Chris Christie/Mike Huckabee; 8.33%	Scott Walker 7.84%, Marco Rubio 7.35%, Jeb Bush 6.37%, Bobby Jindal 5.88%, Ted Cruz 5.39%, Rick Perry 5.39%, Rick Santorum 2.45%, John Huntsman 1.47%, John Kasich 0.49%, Refused 0.49%, Other 1.96%
Magellan Strategies Margin of error: ± 6% Sample size: 270	April 14–15, 2014	Rand Paul; 17%	Mike Huckabee; 16%	Ted Cruz; 14%	Chris Christie 12%, Marco Rubio 10%, Jeb Bush 9%, Scott Walker 8%, John Kasich 2%, Undecided 12%
Public Policy Polling Margin of error: ± 6.1% Sample size: 255	March 13–16, 2014	Ted Cruz; 17%	Mike Huckabee; 15%	Chris Christie; 14%	Rand Paul 10%, Paul Ryan 10%, Jeb Bush 8%, Marco Rubio 8%, Scott Walker 5%, Bobby Jindal 2%, Other/Undecided 11%
Public Policy Polling Margin of error: ± 5.2% Sample size: 355	December 3–4, 2013	Ted Cruz; 18%	Chris Christie; 17%	Rand Paul; 16%	Marco Rubio 10%, Paul Ryan 9%, Jeb Bush 8%, Scott Walker 6%, Bobby Jindal 3%, Rick Santorum 2%, Other/Undecided 11%

== Connecticut ==
Winner: Donald Trump
Primary date: April 26, 2016

Poll source	Date	1st	2nd	3rd	Other
Primary results	April 26, 2016	Donald Trump; 57.87%	John Kasich; 28.36%	Ted Cruz; 11.71%	Ben Carson 0.81%
Gravis Marketing Margin of error: ± 3.0% Sample size: 964	April 23–24, 2016	Donald Trump 54%	John Kasich; 27%	Ted Cruz; 9%	Undecided 10%
Public Policy Polling Margin of error: ± 4.3% Sample size: 512	April 22–24, 2016	Donald Trump 59%	John Kasich; 25%	Ted Cruz; 13%	Undecided 3%
Quinnipiac University Margin of error: ± 3.4% Sample size: 823	April 12–18, 2016	Donald Trump; 48%	John Kasich; 28%	Ted Cruz; 19%	Undecided 5%
Emerson College Margin of error: ± 5.2% Sample size: 354	April 10 – 11, 2016	Donald Trump; 50%	John Kasich; 26%	Ted Cruz; 17%	Undecided 6%, Other 2%
Emerson College Margin of error: ± 4.6% Sample size: 445	November 13–16, 2015	Donald Trump; 24.7%	Marco Rubio; 14.3%	John Kasich; 10.4%	Jeb Bush 10.1%, Ben Carson 9.1%, Rand Paul 6.2%, Ted Cruz 6.1%, Carly Fiorina 3.6%, Chris Christie 2.4%, Mike Huckabee 0.4%, George Pataki 0.2%, Lindsey Graham 0.2%, Other 1.6%, Undecided 10.9%
Quinnipiac University Margin of error: ± 4.6% Sample size: 464	October 7–11, 2015	Donald Trump; 34%	Ben Carson; 14%	Carly Fiorina; 11%	Marco Rubio 7%, Jeb Bush 6%, Ted Cruz 6%, Chris Christie 4%, John Kasich 4%, George Pataki 1%, Rand Paul 1%, Jim Gilmore 0%, Lindsey Graham 0%, Mike Huckabee 0%, Bobby Jindal 0%, Rick Santorum 0%, Someone else 1%, Wouldn't vote 1%, DK/NA 9%
Quinnipiac University Margin of error: ± 4.6% Sample size: 459	March 6–9, 2015	Jeb Bush; 18%	Scott Walker; 18%	Rand Paul; 12%	Chris Christie 11%, Ben Carson 7%, Ted Cruz 5%, Marco Rubio 4%, Mike Huckabee 3%, Bobby Jindal 2%, Rick Perry 2%, Lindsey Graham 0%, John Kasich 0%, Rick Santorum 0%, Other 3%, Wouldn't vote 3%, Undecided 12%

== Delaware ==
Winner: Donald Trump
Primary date: April 26, 2016

Poll source	Date	1st	2nd	3rd	Other
Primary results	April 26, 2016	Donald Trump; 60.77%	John Kasich; 20.35%	Ted Cruz; 15.90%	Marco Rubio 0.89%, Jeb Bush 0.83%
Gravis Marketing Margin of error: ± 3.0% Sample size: 1,038	April 17–18, 2016	Donald Trump; 55%	John Kasich; 18%	Ted Cruz; 15%	Unsure 12%

== District of Columbia ==
Winner: Marco Rubio
Primary date: March 12, 2016

Poll source	Date	1st	2nd	3rd	Other
Convention results	March 12, 2016	Marco Rubio; 37.30%	John Kasich; 35.54%	Donald Trump; 13.77%	Ted Cruz 12.36%, Jeb Bush 0.49, Rand Paul 0.42%, Ben Carson 0.11%

== Florida ==
Winner: Donald Trump
Primary date: March 15, 2016

Poll source	Date	1st	2nd	3rd	Other
Primary results	March 15, 2016	Donald Trump; 45.72%	Marco Rubio; 27.04%	Ted Cruz; 17.14%	John Kasich 6.77%, Jeb Bush 1.84%, Ben Carson 0.90%, Rand Paul 0.19%, Mike Huckabee 0.11%, Chris Christie 0.11%, Carly Fiorina 0.08%, Rick Santorum 0.05%, Lindsey Graham 0.03%, Jim Gilmore 0.01%
Opinion Savvy/Fox 13/ Florida Times-Union/ Fox 35 Margin of error: ± 3.5% Sample size: 787	March 13, 2016	Donald Trump; 44.3%	Marco Rubio; 26.2%	Ted Cruz; 18.2%	John Kasich 9.7%, Undecided 1.6%
Trafalgar Group Margin of error: ± 2.58% Sample size: 1500	March 12–13, 2016	Donald Trump; 43.94%	Marco Rubio; 24.46%	Ted Cruz; 19.56%	John Kasich 8.57%, Undecided 3.47%
ARG Margin of error: ± 5% Sample size: 400	March 11–13, 2016	Donald Trump; 49%	Marco Rubio; 24%	Ted Cruz; 16%	John Kasich 8%, Undecided 3%
Monmouth University Margin of error: ± 4.9% Sample size: 405	March 11–13, 2016	Donald Trump; 44%	Marco Rubio; 27%	Ted Cruz; 17%	John Kasich 9%, Other 1%, Undecided 3%
Quinnipiac University Margin of error: ± 4% Sample size: 615	March 8–13, 2016	Donald Trump; 46%	Marco Rubio; 22%	Ted Cruz; 14%	John Kasich 10%, Other 1%, No Preference 6%
CBS News/YouGov Margin of error: ± 4.8% Sample size: 827	March 9–11, 2016	Donald Trump; 44%	Ted Cruz; 24%	Marco Rubio; 21%	John Kasich 9%, No Preference 2%
Florida Atlantic University Margin of error: ± 3% Sample size: 852	March 8–11, 2016	Donald Trump; 44%	Marco Rubio; 21%	Ted Cruz; 21%	John Kasich 9%, Undecided 5%
NBC News/WSJ/Marist Margin of error: ± 4.3% Sample size: 511	March 4–10, 2016	Donald Trump; 43%	Marco Rubio; 22%	Ted Cruz; 21%	John Kasich 9%
Opinion Savvy/Fox 13/ Florida Times-Union/ Fox 35 Margin of error: ± 4% Sample size: 590	March 9, 2016	Donald Trump; 42.8%	Marco Rubio; 23.5%	Ted Cruz; 20.9%	John Kasich 10.4%, Undecided 2.5%
Trafalgar Group Margin of error: ± 2.83% Sample size: 1280	March 8–9, 2016	Donald Trump; 41.87%	Marco Rubio; 23.10%	Ted Cruz; 21.43%	John Kasich 10.94%, Undecided 2.67%
Suffolk University/Boston Globe Margin of error: ± 4.4% Sample size: 500	March 7–9, 2016	Donald Trump; 35.6%	Marco Rubio; 26.6%	Ted Cruz; 19.2%	John Kasich 9.8%, Undecided 7.6%, Other 1.2%
The Ledger/10 News WTSP Margin of error: ± 3.8% Sample size: 700	March 7–9, 2016	Donald Trump; 36%	Marco Rubio; 30%	Ted Cruz; 17%	John Kasich 8%
Public Policy Polling Margin of error: ± 3.3% Sample size: 904	March 7–8, 2016	Donald Trump; 42%	Marco Rubio; 32%	Ted Cruz; 14%	John Kasich 8%, Undecided 5%
Fox News Margin of error: ± 3.5% Sample size: 813	March 5–8, 2016	Donald Trump; 43%	Marco Rubio; 20%	Ted Cruz; 16%	John Kasich 10%, Undecided 6%, Other 5%
University of North Florida Margin of error: ± 3.57% Sample size: 752	March 2–7, 2016	Donald Trump; 35.5%	Marco Rubio; 23.8%	Ted Cruz; 15.5%	John Kasich 8.8%, Undecided 14.3%, Other 2.6%
Quinnipiac University Margin of error: ± 3.8% Sample size: 657	March 2–7, 2016	Donald Trump; 45%	Marco Rubio; 22%	Ted Cruz; 18%	John Kasich 8%, Undecided 6%, Other 1%
SurveyUSA/Bay News 9/News 13 Margin of error: ± 3.3% Sample size: 937	March 4–6, 2016	Donald Trump; 42%	Marco Rubio; 22%	Ted Cruz; 17%	John Kasich 10%, Undecided 5%, Other 3%
Monmouth University Margin of error: ± 4.9% Sample size: 403	March 3–6, 2016	Donald Trump; 38%	Marco Rubio; 30%	Ted Cruz; 17%	John Kasich 10%, Ben Carson 1%, Undecided 5%
CNN/ORC Margin of error: ± 5.5% Sample size: 313	March 2–6, 2016	Donald Trump; 40%	Marco Rubio; 24%	Ted Cruz; 19%	John Kasich 5%
Univision/Washington Post Margin of error: ± 5% Sample size: 450	March 2–5, 2016	Donald Trump; 38%	Marco Rubio; 31%	Ted Cruz; 19%	John Kasich 4%, Don't Know 6%, Other 1%
Our Principles PAC Margin of error: ± 3.5% Sample size: 800	February 29 – March 2, 2016	Donald Trump; 35.4%	Marco Rubio; 30.3%	Ted Cruz; 15.5%	John Kasich 8.5%, Ben Carson 4.6%, Undecided 5.6%
Public Policy Polling Margin of error: ± 4.6% Sample size: 464	February 24–25, 2016	Donald Trump; 45%	Marco Rubio; 25%	Ted Cruz; 10%	John Kasich 8%, Ben Carson 5%, Undecided 7%
Associated Industries of Florida Margin of error: ± 4% Sample size: 600	February 23–24, 2016	Donald Trump; 34%	Marco Rubio; 27%	Ted Cruz; 17%	John Kasich 5%, Ben Carson 5%, Undecided 12%
Quinnipiac; University Margin of error: ± 3.7% Sample size: 705	February 21–24, 2016	Donald Trump; 44%	Marco Rubio; 28%	Ted Cruz; 12%	John Kasich 7%, Ben Carson 4%, Someone else 1%, DK/NA 5%
Florida Southern; College Center Margin of error: ± ?% Sample size: 268	January 30- February 6, 2016	Donald Trump; 27.41%	Marco Rubio; 20.43%	Ted Cruz; 12.35%	Ben Carson 6.04%, Jeb Bush 3.71%, John Kasich 1.61%, Mike Huckabee 0.79%, Chris Christie 0.34%, others 1.17%, Don't Care 25.47%
CBS/YouGov Margin of error: ± 4.6% Sample size: 988	January 18–21, 2016	Donald Trump; 41%	Ted Cruz; 22%	Marco Rubio; 18%	Ben Carson 5%, Jeb Bush 4%, John Kasich 2%, Chris Christie 2%, Rand Paul 1%, all others 0%, no preference 1%
Florida Atlantic University Margin of error: ± 4.9% Sample size: 386	January 15–18, 2016	Donald Trump; 47.6%	Ted Cruz; 16.3%	Marco Rubio; 11.1%	Jeb Bush 9.5%, Ben Carson 3.3%, Rand Paul 3.1%, Chris Christie 2.6%, Mike Huckabee 2.6%, John Kasich 2.1%, Carly Fiorina 0.5%, Jim Gilmore 0.2%, Others 0.1%, Undecided 1.1%
Opinion Savvy/Fox 13/Florida Times-Union Margin of error: ± 3.3% Sample size: 838	January 17, 2016	Donald Trump; 31%	Ted Cruz; 19%	Jeb Bush; 13%	Marco Rubio 12%, Ben Carson 7%, Chris Christie 4%, Carly Fiorina 4%, John Kasich 3%, Rand Paul 3%, Mike Huckabee 2%, Rick Santorum 0%, Undecided 2%
Associated Industries of Florida Margin of error: ± 3.5% Sample size: 800	December 16–17, 2015	Donald Trump 29%	Ted Cruz 18%	Marco Rubio 17%	Jeb Bush 10%, Ben Carson 6%, Other 8%, Undecided 12%
Opinion Savvy/Fox 13/Florida Times-Union Margin of error: ± 4.1% Sample size: 555	December 16, 2015	Donald Trump 29.7%	Ted Cruz 20.4%	Marco Rubio 15%	Jeb Bush 12.5%, Ben Carson 7.7%, Chris Christie 6.1%, Carly Fiorina 2.7%, Rand Paul 2.6%, John Kasich 0.9%, George Pataki 0.1%, Rick Santorum 0.1%, Undecided 2.2%
St. Pete Polls Margin of error: ± 1.5% Sample size: 2,694	December 14–15, 2015	Donald Trump 36%	Ted Cruz 22%	Marco Rubio 17%	Jeb Bush 9%, Ben Carson 6%, Chris Christie 3%, John Kasich 2%, Carly Fiorina 1%, Rand Paul 1%, Unsure or someone else 4%
St. Leo University Sample size: 404	November 29 – December 3, 2015	Donald Trump 30.6%	Marco Rubio 15.0%	Jeb Bush 14.3%	Ben Carson 10.9%, Ted Cruz 10.2%, Rand Paul 5.9%, Chris Christie 4.1%, Carly Fiorina 2.7%, John Kasich 2.0%, Mike Huckabee 1.4%, Rick Santorum 0.7%, Others 0.7%, Undecided 1.4%
Florida Atlantic University Margin of error: ± 5.2% Sample size: 355	November 15–16, 2015	Donald Trump 35.9%	Marco Rubio 18.4%	Ben Carson 14.5%	Ted Cruz 10%, Jeb Bush 8.9%, Rand Paul 4.1%, John Kasich 3%, Carly Fiorina 2.4%, Mike Huckabee 0.4%, Lindsey Graham 0.4%, Chris Christie 0.1%, Others 0.3%, Undecided 1.9%
Florida Times-Union Margin of error: ± 3.4% Sample size: 806	November 11, 2015	Donald Trump 22.7%	Ben Carson 22.3%	Marco Rubio 17.9%	Ted Cruz 12.4%, Jeb Bush 10.9%, Carly Fiorina 4.7%, Chris Christie 2.9%, John Kasich 2.8%, Rand Paul 1%, Mike Huckabee 1%, Bobby Jindal 0.4%, Rick Santorum 0.1%, George Pataki 0%, Lindsey Graham 0%, Undecided 1%
SurveyUSA Margin of error: ± 3.3% Sample size: 922	October 28 – November 1, 2015	Donald Trump 37%	Ben Carson 17%	Marco Rubio 16%	Ted Cruz 10%, Jeb Bush 7%, Carly Fiorina 3%, John Kasich 3% Mike Huckabee 1% other 1%, unsure 3%
Viewpoint Florida Margin of error: ± 2.2% Sample size: 2047	October 29–30, 2015	Donald Trump 26.81%	Marco Rubio 16.28%	Ben Carson 15.07%	Ted Cruz 12.41%, Jeb Bush 12.07%, Carly Fiorina 4.40%, other 4.67%, unsure 8.29%
Saint Leo University Polling Institute Margin of error: ± 7.0% Sample size: 163	October 17–22, 2015	Donald Trump 25.8%	Marco Rubio 21.5%	Jeb Bush 15.3%	Ben Carson 14.7%
UNF Margin of error: ± 3.87% Sample size: 627	October 8–13, 2015	Donald Trump 21.7%	Ben Carson 19.3%	Marco Rubio 14.9%	Jeb Bush 9%, Ted Cruz 6.8%, Carly Fiorina 6.5%, John Kasich 3.5%, Mike Huckabee 1.4%, Chris Christie 1.3%, Rand Paul <1%, George Pataki <1%, Rick Santorum <1%, Lindsey Graham <1%, Bobby Jindal <1%, Someone else 1.5%, DK 8%, NA 4.1%
Quinnipiac University Margin of error: ± 4.6% Sample size: 461	September 25 – October 5, 2015	Donald Trump 28%	Ben Carson 16%	Marco Rubio 14%	Jeb Bush 12%, Carly Fiorina 7%, Ted Cruz 6%, Rand Paul 2%, John Kasich 2%, Chris Christie 2%, Mike Huckabee 1%, Jim Gilmore 0%, George Pataki 0%, Rick Santorum 0%, Lindsey Graham 0%, Bobby Jindal 0%, Would not vote 1%, Someone else 0%, DK/NA 10%
FL Chamber Margin of error: ± 4% Sample size: ?	September 16–20, 2015	Donald Trump 25%	Marco Rubio 14%	Jeb Bush 13%	Carly Fiorina 11%, Ben Carson 9%, Ted Cruz 6%
Florida Atlantic Univ. Margin of error: ± 5.2% Sample size: 352	September 17–20, 2015	Donald Trump 31.5%	Marco Rubio 19.2%	Jeb Bush 11.3%	Ben Carson 10.3%, Carly Fiorina 8.3%, Ted Cruz 5.8%, Chris Christie 4.1%, Rand Paul 3.2%, Scott Walker 2%, John Kasich 1.7%, Mike Huckabee 1.4%, Undecided 1.1%
Public Policy Polling Margin of error: ± 5.0% Sample size: 377	September 11–13, 2015	Donald Trump 28%	Ben Carson 17%	Jeb Bush 13%	Marco Rubio 10%, Ted Cruz 9%, Carly Fiorina 7%, John Kasich 5%, Mike Huckabee 3%, Chris Christie 2%, Scott Walker 2%, Bobby Jindal 1%, Rick Santorum 1%, Rand Paul 0%, Lindsey Graham 0%, Jim Gilmore 0%, Undecided 1%
Opinion Savvy Margin of error: ± 4.3% Sample size: 498	September 2, 2015	Donald Trump 28.9%	Ben Carson 24.5%	Jeb Bush 18.6%	Marco Rubio 5.6%, Carly Fiorina 5%, John Kasich 2.6%, Ted Cruz 2.5%, Chris Christie 2.4%, Mike Huckabee 2.4%, Scott Walker 1.2%, Bobby Jindal 0.7%, Rand Paul 0.4%, Lindsey Graham 0.3% Rick Santorum 0.1%, Rick Perry 0%, Someone Else 1.4%, undecided 3.5%
Quinnipiac University Margin of error: ± 4.5% Sample size: 477	August 7–18, 2015	Donald Trump 21%	Jeb Bush 17%	Ben Carson 11%	Marco Rubio 11%, Ted Cruz 7%, Carly Fiorina 7%, Mike Huckabee 4%, Scott Walker 4%, Rand Paul 4%, John Kasich 3%, Bobby Jindal 1%, Chris Christie 1%, Rick Perry 0%, Lindsey Graham 0%, Wouldn't vote 1%, Don't know 8%
Opinion Savvy/Insider Advantage Margin of error: ± 4.1% Sample size: 547	August 3, 2015	Donald Trump 26.6%	Jeb Bush 26.2%	Ben Carson 8.3%	Ted Cruz 8.2%, Marco Rubio 6.5%, Scott Walker 5.8%, Mike Huckabee 4.2%, John Kasich 3.1%, Bobby Jindal 2.4%, Carly Fiorina 1.8%, Rand Paul 1.8%, Chris Christie 1.2%, Rick Perry 0.7%, George Pataki 0.3%, Lindsey Graham 0%, Someone else 1.3%, Undecided 1.5%
St. Pete Margin of error: ± 2.2% Sample size: 1,902	July 18–28, 2015	Donald Trump; 26.1%	Jeb Bush 20%	Scott Walker 12.2%	Marco Rubio 9.7%, Ben Carson 4.5%, Ted Cruz 4.2%, John Kasich 4.1%, Rand Paul 3.3%, Someone else/Unsure 15.9%
Mason-Dixon Margin of error: ± 4.5% Sample size: 500	July 20–23, 2015	Jeb Bush; 28%	Marco Rubio 16%	Scott Walker 13%	Donald Trump 11%, Mike Huckabee 5%, Ted Cruz 4%, Rand Paul 3%, John Kasich 3%, Carly Fiorina 2%, Ben Carson 1%, Bobby Jindal 1%, Rick Santorum 0%, Rick Perry 0%, Chris Christie 0%, Lindsey Graham 0%, George Pataki 0%, Undecided 13%
Gravis Marketing Margin of error: ± 3.0% Sample size: 729	June 16–20, 2015	Jeb Bush; 27.5%	Marco Rubio; 23%	Rand Paul; 8.8%	Scott Walker 8.7%, Carly Fiorina 6.2%, Ted Cruz 5.2%, Mike Huckabee 4.5%, Bobby Jindal 2.4%, Lindsey Graham 0.3%, Rick Santorum 0.1%, Unsure 13.3%
Quinnipiac University Margin of error: ± 4.8% Sample size: 413	June 4–15, 2015	Jeb Bush; 20%	Marco Rubio; 18%	Scott Walker 9%	Ben Carson 7%, Mike Huckabee 6%, Rand Paul 5%, Rick Perry 4%, Chris Christie 3%, Ted Cruz 3%, Donald Trump 3%, Carly Fiorina 2%, Lindsey Graham 1%, Bobby Jindal 1%, John Kasich 1%, George Pataki 1%, Rick Santorum 1%, Someone else 1%, Wouldn't vote 1%, Don't know 13%
Mason-Dixon Margin of error: ± 5% Sample size: 400	April 14–16, 2015	Marco Rubio; 31%	Jeb Bush; 30%	Ted Cruz; 8%	Rand Paul 7%, Scott Walker 2%, Other 5% Undecided 17%
Quinnipiac University Margin of error: ± 4.7% Sample size: 428	March 17–28, 2015	Jeb Bush; 24%	Scott Walker; 15%	Marco Rubio; 12%	Ben Carson 8%, Ted Cruz 7%, Mike Huckabee 6%, Rand Paul 4%, Rick Perry 2%, Chris Christie 1%, John Kaisch 1%, Lindsey Graham 0%, Bobby Jindal 0%, Rick Santorum 0%, Someone else 3%, Wouldn't vote 1% Undecided 15%
Quinnipiac University Margin of error: ± 4.7% Sample size: 428	March 17–28, 2015	Marco Rubio; 21%	Scott Walker; 17%	Ben Carson; 9%	Ted Cruz 8%, Rand Paul 7%, Mike Huckabee 6%, Chris Christie 3%, Rick Perry 3%, Lindsey Graham 1%, Bobby Jindal 1%, John Kaisch 1%, Rick Santorum 0%, Someone else 3%, Wouldn't vote 2% Undecided 20%
Quinnipiac University Margin of error: ± 4.7% Sample size: 428	March 17–28, 2015	Jeb Bush; 26%	Marco Rubio; 15%	Ben Carson; 10%	Ted Cruz 10%, Mike Huckabee 6%, Rand Paul 5%, Rick Perry 3%, Chris Christie 2%, Bobby Jindal 2%, John Kaisch 1%, Lindsey Graham 0%, Rick Santorum 0%, Someone else 3%, Wouldn't vote 1% Undecided 16%
Public Policy Polling Margin of error: ± 4.8% Sample size: 425	March 19–22, 2015	Jeb Bush; 25%	Scott Walker; 17%	Marco Rubio; 15%	Ben Carson 12%, Mike Huckabee 7%, Ted Cruz 6%, Chris Christie 4%, Rand Paul 4%, Rick Perry 3%, Undecided 6%
Gravis Marketing Margin of error: ± 4% Sample size: 513	February 24–25, 2015	Jeb Bush; 23%	Scott Walker; 22%	Marco Rubio; 11%	Mike Huckabee 10%, Ben Carson 8%, Chris Christie 6%, Rand Paul 5%, Ted Cruz 2%, Rick Perry 1%, Undecided 12%
Gravis Marketing Margin of error: ± 4% Sample size: 513	February 24–25, 2015	Jeb Bush; 40%	Marco Rubio; 36%		Undecided 24%
Quinnipiac University Margin of error: ± 5.3% Sample size: 348	January 22 – February 1, 2015	Jeb Bush; 30%	Marco Rubio; 13%	Mike Huckabee; 10%	Mitt Romney 9%, Scott Walker 8%, Ben Carson 7%, Ted Cruz 3%, Bobby Jindal 3%, Rand Paul 3%, Rick Santorum 3%, Chris Christie 2%, Rick Perry 1%, John Kasich 0%, Other 1%, Wouldn't vote 0%, Undecided 8%
Quinnipiac University Margin of error: ± 5.3% Sample size: 348	January 22 – February 1, 2015	Jeb Bush; 32%	Marco Rubio; 15%	Mike Huckabee; 11%	Scott Walker 9%, Ben Carson 8%, Ted Cruz 4%, Chris Christie 3%, Bobby Jindal 3%, Rand Paul 3%, Rick Santorum 3%, Rick Perry 1%, John Kasich 0%, Other 1%, Wouldn't vote 0%, Undecided 8%
Gravis Marketing Margin of error: ± 3% Sample size: 811	November 19–20, 2014	Jeb Bush; 33%	Marco Rubio; 14%	Ted Cruz; 11%	Rand Paul 11%, Chris Christie 6%, Nikki Haley 5%, Paul Ryan 5%, Rick Santorum 3%, Undecided 13%
Gravis Marketing Margin of error: ± 3% Sample size: 811	November 19–20, 2014	Jeb Bush; 44%	Marco Rubio; 34%		Undecided 22%
Quinnipiac University Margin of error: ± 4.6% Sample size: 451	July 17–21, 2014	Jeb Bush; 21%	Marco Rubio; 18%	Ted Cruz; 10%	Rand Paul 8%, Mike Huckabee 7%, Chris Christie 6%, Rick Perry 5%, Paul Ryan 2%, Scott Walker 2%, Bobby Jindal 1%, John Kasich 1%, Rick Santorum 1%, Other 2%, Wouldn't vote 4%, Undecided 13%
Public Policy Polling Margin of error: ± 5.5% Sample size: 315	June 6–9, 2014	Jeb Bush; 30%	Marco Rubio; 14%	Rand Paul; 11%	Ted Cruz 9%, Chris Christie 8%, Mike Huckabee 7%, Scott Walker 7%, Paul Ryan 2%, Bobby Jindal 1%, Someone else/Not sure 10%
Public Policy Polling Margin of error: ± 5.5% Sample size: 315	June 6–9, 2014	Marco Rubio; 45%	Jeb Bush; 41%		Not sure 14%
Quinnipiac University Margin of error: ± 4.4% Sample size: 501	April 23–28, 2014	Jeb Bush; 27%	Rand Paul; 14%	Marco Rubio; 11%	Chris Christie 7%, Ted Cruz 6%, Mike Huckabee 6%, Paul Ryan 6%, Scott Walker 4%, Bobby Jindal 1%, Other 1%, Wouldn't vote 2%, Undecided 16%
Magellan Strategies Margin of error: ± 3.33% Sample size: 868	April 14–15, 2014	Jeb Bush; 38%	Mike Huckabee; 11%	Ted Cruz; 10%	Rand Paul 10%, Marco Rubio 8%, Chris Christie 7%, Scott Walker 7%, John Kasich 3%, Undecided 6%
Quinnipiac University Margin of error: ± 4.1% Sample size: 586	January 22–27, 2014	Jeb Bush; 25%	Marco Rubio; 16%	Rand Paul; 11%	Chris Christie 9%, Ted Cruz 9%, Paul Ryan 5%, Scott Walker 5%, Bobby Jindal 3%, Other 2%, Wouldn't vote 2%, Undecided 14%
Quinnipiac University Margin of error: ± 3.8% Sample size: 668	November 12–17, 2013	Jeb Bush; 22%	Marco Rubio; 18%	Chris Christie; 14%	Ted Cruz 12%, Rand Paul 9%, Paul Ryan 6%, Bobby Jindal 3%, Scott Walker 2%, Other 1%, Wouldn't vote 1%, Undecided 12%
Public Policy Polling Margin of error: ± 5.4% Sample size: 326	March 15–18, 2013	Jeb Bush; 30%	Marco Rubio; 29%	Rand Paul; 11%	Mike Huckabee 9%, Chris Christie 8%, Paul Ryan 4%, Bobby Jindal 2%, Rick Perry 1%, Susana Martinez 0%, Someone Else/Undecided 6%
Public Policy Polling Margin of error: ± 5.4% Sample size: 326	March 15–18, 2013	Marco Rubio; 49%	Jeb Bush; 36%		Undecided 15%
Public Policy Polling Margin of error: ± 4.7% Sample size: 436	January 11–13, 2013	Marco Rubio; 31%	Jeb Bush; 26%	Mike Huckabee; 11%	Chris Christie 7%, Bobby Jindal 5%, Rand Paul 5%, Paul Ryan 5%, Susana Martinez 2%, Rick Perry 2%, Someone Else/Undecided 5%

== Georgia ==
Winner: Donald Trump
Primary date: March 1, 2016

Poll source	Date	1st	2nd	3rd	Other
Primary results	March 1, 2016	Donald Trump; 38.81%	Marco Rubio; 24.45%	Ted Cruz; 23.60%	Ben Carson 6.23%, John Kasich 5.69%, Jeb Bush 0.69%, Rand Paul 0.22%, Mike Huckabee 0.20%, Chris Christie 0.11%, Carly Fiorina 0.09%, Rick Santorum 0.04%, Lindsey Graham 0.03%, George Pataki 0.02%,
SurveyMonkey Margin of error: ± ?% Sample size: 1171	February 22–29, 2016	Donald Trump; 39%	Ted Cruz; 21%	Marco Rubio; 20%	Ben Carson 9%, John Kasich 6%, Undecided 6%
Landmark/RosettaStone Margin of error: ± 2.6% Sample size: 1400	February 28, 2016	Donald Trump; 39%	Marco Rubio; 20%	Ted Cruz; 15%	Ben Carson 9%, John Kasich 8%, Undecided 9%
Opinion Savvy/Fox 5 Atlanta Margin of error: ± 3.7% Sample size: 710	February 27–28, 2016	Donald Trump; 32.5%	Marco Rubio; 23.2%	Ted Cruz; 23.2%	John Kasich 10.7%, Ben Carson 6.1%, Undecided 4.3%
Trafalgar Group Margin of error: ± 3.14% Sample size: 1350	February 26–28, 2016	Donald Trump; 38.6%	Marco Rubio; 23.54%	Ted Cruz; 20.74%	John Kasich 7.03%, Ben Carson 6.14%, Undecided 3.95%
CBS/YouGov Margin of error: ± 7% Sample size: 493	February 22–26, 2016	Donald Trump; 40%	Ted Cruz; 29%	Marco Rubio; 22%	Ben Carson 7%, John Kasich 2%
ResearchNOW/WABE Margin of error: ± 4.1% Sample size: 400	February 22–24, 2016	Donald Trump; 41%	Marco Rubio; 18%	Ted Cruz; 15%	Ben Carson 8%, John Kasich 7%, Undecided 10%
SurveyUSA/TEGNA Margin of error: ± 3.8% Sample size: 684	February 22–23, 2016	Donald Trump; 45%	Marco Rubio; 19%	Ted Cruz; 16%	Ben Carson 8%, John Kasich 6%, Other 1%, Undecided 5%
Opinion Savvy/Fox 5 Atlanta Margin of error: ± 3.6% Sample size: 745	February 22–23, 2016	Donald Trump; 33.6%	Marco Rubio; 22.2%	Ted Cruz; 20.4%	John Kasich 8.9%, Ben Carson 7.7%, Undecided 7.2%
NBC News/Wall Street; Journal/Marist Margin of error: ± 4.2% Sample size: 543	February 18–23, 2016	Donald Trump; 30%	Ted Cruz; 23%	Marco Rubio; 23%	Ben Carson 9%, John Kasich 9%
Landmark/RosettaStone Margin of error: ± 4.4% Sample size: 500	February 21, 2016	Donald Trump; 31.7%	Marco Rubio; 22.7%	Ted Cruz; 18.7%	Ben Carson 8.1%, John Kasich 7.9%, Undecided 10.9%
Landmark/RosettaStone Margin of error: ± 4.4% Sample size: 500	February 4, 2016	Donald Trump; 27.3%	Ted Cruz; 18.3%	Marco Rubio; 18.2%	Ben Carson 7.7%, John Kasich 4.4%, Chris Christie 3.9%, Jeb Bush 3.0%, Carly Fiorina 1.8%, Undecided 15.4%
CBS/YouGov Margin of error: ± 6.2% Sample size: 494	January 18–21, 2016	Donald Trump; 39%	Ted Cruz; 29%	Marco Rubio; 13%	Ben Carson 6%, Jeb Bush 2%, Chris Christie 2%, Carly Fiorina 2%, Mike Huckabee 2%, John Kasich 2%, Jim Gilmore 0%, Rand Paul 0%, Rick Santorum 0%, No preference 1%
Opinion Savvy/Fox 5 Atlanta Margin of error: ± 3.4% Sample size: 803	January 17, 2016	Donald Trump; 33.4%	Ted Cruz; 23.4%	Marco Rubio; 8.2%	Ben Carson 7.3%, Jeb Bush 7.1%, John Kasich 3.8%, Chris Christie 3.7%, Carly Fiorina 3.5%, Rand Paul 3.5%, Mike Huckabee 3.2%, Rick Santorum 0.1%, Undecided 2.7%
Opinion Savvy/Fox 5 Atlanta Margin of error: ± 4.2% Sample size: 538	December 16, 2015	Donald Trump; 34.6%	Ted Cruz 15.8%	Marco Rubio 12%	Ben Carson 6.4%, Jeb Bush 6%, Chris Christie 5.6%, Carly Fiorina 5.1%, John Kasich 2.3%, Rand Paul 2.1%, Lindsey Graham 1.4%, Mike Huckabee 1.4%, George Pataki 0.5%, Undecided 6.8%
WSB TV/Landmark Margin of error: ±3.3% Sample size: 800	December 10, 2015	Donald Trump; 43.3%	Ted Cruz 16.2%	Marco Rubio 10.6%	Ben Carson 6.7%, Jeb Bush 4.8%, Mike Huckabee 1.9%, Carly Fiorina 1.8%, John Kasich 1.5%, Rand Paul 0.5%, Undecided 12.9%
FOX 5/Morris News Margin of error: ±4.7% Sample size: 674	November 9–10, 2015	Ben Carson; 26%	Donald Trump; 24%	Ted Cruz 14%	Marco Rubio 9%, Jeb Bush 8%, Carly Fiorina 6%
WXIA-TV/SurveyUSA Margin of error: ±2% Sample size: 2,075	October 26, 2015	Donald Trump; 35%	Ben Carson; 28%	Marco Rubio 12%	Ted Cruz 8%, Jeb Bush 4%, Carly Fiorina 3%, Mike Huckabee 3%, John Kasich 2%
WSB/Landmark Margin of error: ±4% Sample size: 600	September 23, 2015	Donald Trump; 30.8%	Ben Carson; 17.9%	Carly Fiorina 13.2%	Marco Rubio 9.4%, Ted Cruz 7.9%, Jeb Bush 7.5%, Mike Huckabee 4.4%, John Kasich 1.9%, Rand Paul 1.1%, Undecided 5.9%
Opinion Savvy Margin of error: ±3.8% Sample size: 664	September 3, 2015	Donald Trump; 34.2%	Ben Carson; 24.8%	Jeb Bush; 10.9%	Ted Cruz 6.3%, Mike Huckabee 5.1%, Carly Fiorina 4.5%, John Kasich 2.5%, Marco Rubio 2.1%, Chris Christie 2%, Scott Walker 1.9%, Rick Perry 0.1%, Rick Santorum 0.1%, Bobby Jindal 0.1%, Lindsey Graham 0.1%, Rand Paul 0%, George Pataki 0%, Someone else 1.8%, Undecided 3.5%
WSB/Landmark Margin of error: ± 4.0% Sample size: 600	August 5, 2015	Donald Trump; 34.3%	Jeb Bush; 12.0%	Scott Walker; 10.4%	Mike Huckabee 8.1%, Ben Carson 8.1%, Ted Cruz 5.4%, John Kasich 4.5%, Marco Rubio 4.5%, Chris Christie 2.8%, Rand Paul 2.4%, Undecided 7.5%
5 Atlanta/Morris News Service Margin of error: ± 4.1% Sample size: 569	August 3, 2015	Donald Trump; 30.4%	Jeb Bush; 17.3%	Ben Carson; 9.6%	Mike Huckabee 6.5%, Ted Cruz 5.9%, Scott Walker 5%, Rand Paul 3.4%, Chris Christie 3.2%, Marco Rubio 3% John Kasich 2.8%, Carly Fiorina 2.5% Rick Perry 2.1% Bobby Jindal 1.7%, Lindsey Graham 0.4%, George Pataki 0.2%, Rick Santorum 0.1%, Other/No opinion 5.9%
Landmark Communications/Rosetta Stone Margin of error: ± 4.3% Sample size: 500	May 11–12, 2015	Mike Huckabee; 18.3%	Ben Carson; 15.4%	Scott Walker; 12.6%	Jeb Bush 10.1%, Marco Rubio 9.6%, Ted Cruz 9.3%, Rand Paul 4%, Carly Fiorina 2.6%, Chris Christie 2.2%, Rick Santorum 0.3%, Other/No opinion 15.6%
Insider Advantage Margin of error: ± ? Sample size: 200	February 4, 2015	Jeb Bush; 21.5%	Scott Walker; 17.3%	Mike Huckabee; 16.4%	Ben Carson 15.5%, Rick Perry 7.2%, Rand Paul 3.9%, Marco Rubio 3.9%, Chris Christie 3%, Donald Trump 1.9%, Other/No opinion 9.5%

== Hawaii ==
Winner: Donald Trump
Caucus date: March 8, 2016

Poll source	Date	1st	2nd	3rd	Other
Caucus results	March 8, 2016	Donald Trump; 42.4%	Ted Cruz; 32.7%	Marco Rubio; 13.1%	John Kasich 10.6%, Other 1.1%

== Idaho ==
Winner: Ted Cruz
Primary date: March 8, 2016

Poll source	Date	1st	2nd	3rd	Other
Primary results	March 8, 2016	Ted Cruz; 45.42%	Donald Trump; 28.11%	Marco Rubio; 15.91%	John Kasich 7.43%, Ben Carson 1.75%, Jeb Bush 0.42%, Rand Paul 0.38%, Mike Huckabee 0.16%, Chris Christie 0.16%, Carly Fiorina 0.11%, Rick Santorum 0.10%, Lindsey Graham 0.03%
Dan Jones & Associates Margin of error: ± 4% Sample size: 230	February 17–26, 2016	Donald Trump; 30%	Ted Cruz; 19%	Marco Rubio; 16%	Ben Carson 11%, John Kasich 5%, Others 9%, Don't Know 11%
Dan Jones & Associates Margin of error: ± 3.93% Sample size: 621	January 21–31, 2016	Donald Trump; 31%	Ted Cruz; 19%	Ben Carson; 13%	Marco Rubio 11%, Others 20%, Don't Know 6%
Dan Jones & Associates Margin of error: ± 3.99% Sample size: 604	December 17–29, 2015	Donald Trump; 30%	Ben Carson; 19%	Ted Cruz; 16%	Marco Rubio 10%, Don't Know 10%
Dan Jones & Associates Margin of error: ± 4.35% Sample size: 508	August 20–31, 2015	Donald Trump; 28%	Ben Carson; 15%	Ted Cruz; 7%	Jeb Bush 7%, Marco Rubio 6%, Rand Paul 5%, Don't Know 17%
Dan Jones & Associates Margin of error: ± ?% Sample size: ?	Published August 9, 2015	Donald Trump; 19%	Jeb Bush; 10%	all others <10%	Don't know 24%
Idaho Politics Weekly Margin of error: ± ?% Sample size: ?	June 17, 2015 – July 1, 2015	Jeb Bush; 15%	Donald Trump; 12%	Rand Paul; 10%	Ben Carson 8%, Marco Rubio 7%, Mike Huckabee 5%, Someone else 13%, Don't know 23%

== Illinois ==
Winner: Donald Trump
Primary date: March 15, 2016

Poll source	Date	1st	2nd	3rd	Other
Primary results	March 15, 2016	Donald Trump; 38.80%	Ted Cruz; 30.23%	John Kasich; 19.74%	Marco Rubio 8.74%, Ben Carson 0.79%, Jeb Bush 0.77%, Rand Paul 0.33%, Chris Christie 0.24%, Mike Huckabee 0.19%, Carly Fiorina 0.11%, Rick Santorum 0.08%
CBS News/YouGov Margin of error: ± 4.4% Sample size: 770	March 9–11, 2016	Donald Trump; 38%	Ted Cruz; 34%	John Kasich; 16%	Marco Rubio 11%, No Preference 1%
NBC News/WSJ/Marist Margin of error: ± 4.8% Sample size: 421	March 4–10, 2016	Donald Trump; 34%	Ted Cruz; 25%	John Kasich; 21%	Marco Rubio 16%
WeAskAmerica Margin of error: ± 3.09% Sample size: 1009	March 7–8, 2016	Donald Trump; 32.64%	Ted Cruz; 19.9%	John Kasich; 18.41%	Marco Rubio 11.34%, Other 1.49%, Undecided 16.22%
Chicago Tribune Margin of error: ± 4.1% Sample size: 600	March 2–6, 2016	Donald Trump; 32%	Ted Cruz; 22%	Marco Rubio; 21%	John Kasich 18%, Undecided 7%
WeAskAmerica Margin of error: ± 3% Sample size: 1311	February 24, 2016	Donald Trump; 38.44%	Marco Rubio; 21.21%	Ted Cruz; 15.87%	John Kasich 9.31%, Other 4.73%, Undecided 10.45%
Paul Simon Public; Policy Institute Margin of error: ± 5.6% Sample size: 306	February 15–20, 2016	Donald Trump; 28%	Ted Cruz; 15%	Marco Rubio; 14%	John Kasich 13%, Jeb Bush 8%, Ben Carson 6%, Other 1%, Undecided 15%
Compass Consulting Margin of error: ± 2.5% Sample size: 2,104	December 16, 2015	Donald Trump; 30%	Ted Cruz; 15%	Marco Rubio; 13%	Jeb Bush 7%, Ben Carson 6%, Chris Christie 6%, John Kasich 3%, Carly Fiorina 2%, Rand Paul 2%, Other 2%, Undecided 11%
Victory Research Margin of error: ± 3.46% Sample size: 801	August 16–18, 2015	Donald Trump; 23.3%	Jeb Bush; 16.5%	Scott Walker; 11%	Ben Carson 5.5%, Marco Rubio 5%, Carly Fiorina 4.6%, Other 16.2%, Undecided 17.9%
Public Policy Polling Margin of error: ± 5.1% Sample size: 369	July 20–21, 2015	Scott Walker; 23%	Donald Trump; 18%	Jeb Bush; 11%	Chris Christie 8%, Ben Carson 7%, Marco Rubio 6%, Rand Paul 5%, Mike Huckabee 5%, Ted Cruz 4%, Carly Fiorina 3%, Rick Santorum 2%, Bobby Jindal 2%, Rick Perry 1%, John Kasich 1%, Lindsey Graham 1%, Undecided 3%
Public Policy Polling Margin of error: ± 5.1% Sample size: 375	November 22–25, 2013	Chris Christie; 18%	Ted Cruz; 13%	Jeb Bush; 12%	Rand Paul 10%, Paul Ryan 9%, Scott Walker 7%, Marco Rubio 6%, Bobby Jindal 4%, Rick Santorum 4%, Other/Undecided 16%

== Indiana ==
Winner: Donald Trump
Primary date: May 3, 2016

Poll source	Date	1st	2nd	3rd	Other
Primary results	May 3, 2016	Donald Trump; 53.25%	Ted Cruz; 36.64%	John Kasich; 7.57%	Ben Carson 0.80%, Jeb Bush 0.59%, Marco Rubio 0.47%, Rand Paul 0.39%, Chris Christie 0.16%, Carly Fiorina 0.13%
Gravis Marketing Margin of error: ± 5.0% Sample size: 379	April 28–29, 2016	Donald Trump; 44%	Ted Cruz; 27%	John Kasich; 9%	Undecided 19%
ARG Margin of error: ± 4.0% Sample size: 400	April 27–28, 2016	Donald Trump; 41%	Ted Cruz; 32%	John Kasich; 21%	Undecided 6%
NBC News/Wall Street Journal/Marist Margin of error: ± 3.9% Sample size: 645	April 26–28, 2016	Donald Trump; 49%	Ted Cruz; 34%	John Kasich; 13%	Undecided 4%
IPFW Margin of error: ± 4.9% Sample size: 400	April 13–27, 2016	Ted Cruz; 45%	Donald Trump; 29%	John Kasich; 13%	Undecided 13%
Clout Research Margin of error: ±4.75% Sample size: 423	April 27, 2016	Donald Trump 37.1%	Ted Cruz; 35.2%	John Kasich; 16.3%	Undecided 11.4%
CBS News/YouGov Margin of error: ± 6.6% Sample size: 548	April 20–22, 2016	Donald Trump 40%	Ted Cruz; 35%	John Kasich; 20%	Undecided 5%
Fox News Margin of error: ± 4% Sample size: 602	April 18–21, 2016	Donald Trump; 41%	Ted Cruz; 33%	John Kasich; 16%	Undecided 7%, None 2%
POS/Howey Politics Indiana/WTHR Channel Margin of error: ± 4.3% Sample size: 507	April 18–21, 2016	Donald Trump; 37%	Ted Cruz; 31%	John Kasich; 22%	Undecided 7%, Other 2%
Bellwether Margin of error: ± 3.5% Sample size: 670	December 2–9, 2015	Donald Trump; 26%	Ted Cruz; 17%	Marco Rubio; 17%	Ben Carson 16%, Jeb Bush 6%, Rand Paul 5%, Chris Christie 3%, Carly Fiorina 3%, Rick Santorum 1%, Mike Huckabee 1%, John Kasich 1%

== Iowa ==
Winner: Ted Cruz
Caucus date: February 1, 2016

Poll source	Date	1st	2nd	3rd	Other
Caucus results	February 1, 2016	Ted Cruz; 27.64%	Donald Trump; 24.30%	Marco Rubio; 23.12%	Ben Carson 9.30%, Rand Paul 4.54%, Jeb Bush 2.80%, Carly Fiorina 1.86%, John Kasich 1.86%, Mike Huckabee 1.79%, Chris Christie 1.76%, Rick Santorum 0.95%, Jim Gilmore 0.01%, Other 0.06%
Emerson College Margin of error: ± 5.6% Sample size: 298	January 29–31, 2016	Donald Trump; 27.3%	Ted Cruz; 25.6%	Marco Rubio; 21.6%	Mike Huckabee 4.7%, Jeb Bush 3.8%, John Kasich 3.8%, Rand Paul 3.4%, Ben Carson 3.4%, Chris Christie 3.2%, Carly Fiorina 1.7%, Rick Santorum 0.5%, Undecided 1%
Quinnipiac University Margin of error: ± 3.3% Sample size: 890	January 25–31, 2016	Donald Trump; 31%	Ted Cruz; 24%	Marco Rubio; 17%	Ben Carson 8%, Jeb Bush 4%, Rand Paul 4%, Mike Huckabee 3%, Carly Fiorina 2%, John Kasich 2%, Chris Christie 1%, Rick Santorum 1%, Jim Gilmore 0%, Not decided 3%
Opinion Savvy Margin of error: ± 3.2% Sample size: 887	January 29–30, 2016	Donald Trump; 20.1%	Ted Cruz; 19.4%	Marco Rubio; 18.6%	Ben Carson 9.0%, Rand Paul 8.6%, Jeb Bush 4.9%, Mike Huckabee 4.4%, John Kasich 4.0%, Carly Fiorina 3.8%, Chris Christie 3.0%, Rick Santorum 2.1%, Undecided 2.2%
Des Moines Register/ Bloomberg/Selzer Margin of error: ± 3.5% Sample size: 602	January 26–29, 2016	Donald Trump; 28%	Ted Cruz; 23%	Marco Rubio; 15%	Ben Carson 10%, Rand Paul 5%, Chris Christie 3%, Jeb Bush 2%, Mike Huckabee 2%, Carly Fiorina 2%, John Kasich 2%, Rick Santorum 2%, Jim Gimore 0%, Undecided 2%, Uncommitted 3%
Public Policy Polling Margin of error: ± 3.5% Sample size: 780	January 26–27, 2016	Donald Trump; 31%	Ted Cruz; 23%	Marco Rubio; 14%	Ben Carson 9%, Jeb Bush 4%, Mike Huckabee 4%, Rand Paul 4%, Carly Fiorina 3%, John Kasich 2%, Chris Christie 2%, Rick Santorum 1%, Jim Gimore 1%, Undecided 2%
NBC/WSJ/Marist Margin of error: ± 4.8% Sample size: 415	January 24–26, 2016	Donald Trump; 32%	Ted Cruz; 25%	Marco Rubio; 18%	Ben Carson 8%, Jeb Bush 4%, Carly Fiorina 2%, John Kasich 2%, Rand Paul 2%, Chris Christie 2%, Mike Huckabee 2%, Other 0%, Undecided 3%
Monmouth University Margin of error: ± 4.4% Sample size: 500	January 23–26, 2016	Donald Trump; 30%	Ted Cruz; 23%	Marco Rubio; 16%	Ben Carson 10%, Jeb Bush 4%, Rand Paul 3%, John Kasich 3%, Mike Huckabee 3%, Chris Christie 2%, Carly Fiorina 2%, Rick Santorum 1%, Jim Gilmore 0%, Other 0%, Undecided 3%
ARG Margin of error: ± 5.0% Sample size: 400	January 21–24, 2016	Donald Trump; 33%	Ted Cruz; 26%	Marco Rubio; 11%	Ben Carson 7%, Chris Christie 4%, Rand Paul 4%, Jeb Bush 3%, John Kasich 3%, Mike Huckabee 2%, Rick Santorum 1%, Carly Fiorina 1%, Jim Gilmore 0%, Other 1%, Undecided 5%
Quinnipiac University Margin of error: ± 3.8% Sample size: 651	January 18–24, 2016	Donald Trump; 31%	Ted Cruz; 29%	Marco Rubio; 13%	Ben Carson 7%, Rand Paul 5%, Jeb Bush 4%, Chris Christie 3%, Mike Huckabee 2%, Carly Fiorina 1%, John Kasich 1%, Jim Gilmore 0%, Rick Santorum 0%, Not decided 2%
ISU/WHO-HD Margin of error: ± ?% Sample size: 283	January 5–22, 2016	Ted Cruz; 25.8%	Donald Trump; 18.9%	Ben Carson; 13.4%	Marco Rubio 12.3%, Rand Paul 6.9%, Jeb Bush 3.8%, Mike Huckabee 3.7%, Carly Fiorina 1.1%, Rick Santorum <1%, Chris Christie <1%, John Kasich <1%
Fox News Margin of error: ± 5.0% Sample size: 378	January 18–21, 2016	Donald Trump; 34%	Ted Cruz; 23%	Marco Rubio; 12%	Ben Carson 7%, Rand Paul 6%, Chris Christie 4%, Jeb Bush 4%, John Kasich 2%, Mike Huckabee 2%, Rick Santorum 2%, Carly Fiorina 1%, Other 1%, Don't Know 2%
CBS/YouGov Margin of error: ± 5.9% Sample size: 492	January 18–21, 2016	Donald Trump; 39%	Ted Cruz; 34%	Marco Rubio; 13%	Ben Carson 5%, Rand Paul 3%, Chris Christie 2%, Jeb Bush 1%, John Kasich 1%, Carly Fiorina 1%, Mike Huckabee 0%, Jim Gilmore 0%, No Preference 0%
Emerson College Margin of error: ± 5.9% Sample size: 271	January 18–20, 2016	Donald Trump; 33.1%	Ted Cruz; 22.8%	Marco Rubio; 14.2%	Ben Carson 9.1%, Chris Christie 5.4%, Jeb Bush 5.1%, John Kasich 2.9%, Rand Paul 2.7%, Carly Fiorina 2.1%, Mike Huckabee 1.7%, Undecided 1%
CNN/ORC Margin of error: ± 6.0% Sample size: 266	January 15–20, 2016	Donald Trump; 37%	Ted Cruz; 26%	Marco Rubio; 14%	Ben Carson 6%, Jeb Bush 3%, Mike Huckabee 3%, Rand Paul 2%, Carly Fiorina 1%, Rick Santorum 1%, Chris Christie 1%, John Kasich 1%
Monmouth College/KBUR/Douglas Fulmer & Associates Margin of error: ± 3.7% Sample size: 687	January 18–19, 2016	Ted Cruz; 27%	Donald Trump; 25%	Ben Carson; 11%	Marco Rubio 9%, Jeb Bush 7%, Chris Christie 4%, Mike Huckabee 4%, Rand Paul 3%, John Kasich 3%, Carly Fiorina 3%, Rick Santorum 1%, Jim Gilmore 1%, Undecided 4%
Loras College Margin of error: ± 4.4% Sample size: 500	January 13–18, 2016	Donald Trump; 26%	Ted Cruz; 25%	Marco Rubio; 13%	Ben Carson 8%, Jeb Bush 6%, John Kasich 4%, Chris Christie 3%, Mike Huckabee 3%, Rand Paul 3%, Carly Fiorina 2%, Rick Santorum 1%, Undecide 7%
Public Policy Polling Margin of error: ± 4.3% Sample size: 530	January 8–10, 2016	Donald Trump; 28%	Ted Cruz; 26%	Marco Rubio; 13%	Ben Carson 8%, Jeb Bush 6%, Chris Christie 3%, Carly Fiorina 3%, Mike Huckabee 3%, John Kasich 3%, Rand Paul 3%, Rick Santorum 2%, Jim Gilmore 0%, Undecided 2%
DM Register/Bloomberg Margin of error: ± 4.4% Sample size: 500	January 7–10, 2016	Ted Cruz; 25%	Donald Trump; 22%	Marco Rubio; 12%	Ben Carson 11%, Rand Paul 5%, Jeb Bush 4%, Chris Christie 3%, Mike Huckabee 3%, Carly Fiorina 2%, John Kasich 2%, Rick Santorum 1%
ARG Margin of error: ± 4.0% Sample size: 600	January 6–10, 2016	Donald Trump; 29%	Ted Cruz; 25%	Marco Rubio; 10%	Ben Carson 8%, Chris Christie 6%, Rand Paul 4%, Jeb Bush 3%, John Kasich 3%, Mike Huckabee 2%, Rick Santorum 2%, Carly Fiorina 1%, Other 1%, Undecided 5%
Quinnipiac University Margin of error: ± 4.0% Sample size: 602	January 5–10, 2016	Donald Trump; 31%	Ted Cruz; 29%	Marco Rubio; 15%	Ben Carson 7%, Chris Christie 4%, Jeb Bush 3%, Mike Huckabee 3%, Rand Paul 2%, John Kasich 2%, Carly Fiorina 1%, Rick Santorum 1%, Not decided 5%
Fox News Margin of error: ± 4.0% Sample size: 504	January 4–7, 2016	Ted Cruz; 27%	Donald Trump; 23%	Marco Rubio; 15%	Ben Carson 9%, Jeb Bush 7%, Rand Paul 5%, Chris Christie 4%, Mike Huckabee 2%, Carly Fiorina 1%, John Kasich 1%, Rick Santorum 1%, Other 1%, Undecided 2%
NBC/WSJ/Marist Margin of error: ± 4.6% Sample size: 456	January 2–7, 2016	Ted Cruz; 28%	Donald Trump; 24%	Marco Rubio; 13%	Ben Carson 11%, Rand Paul 5%, Jeb Bush 4%, Chris Christie 3%, Carly Fiorina 3%, Mike Huckabee 2%, John Kasich 2%, Other 1%, Undecided 3%

Polls in 2015

Poll source	Date	1st	2nd	3rd	Other
Gravis Marketing Margin of error: ± 5.0% Sample size: 440	December 18–21, 2015	Donald Trump; 31%	Ted Cruz; 31%	Marco Rubio; 9%	Ben Carson 7%, Jeb Bush 4%, Mike Huckabee 4%, Carly Fiorina 3%, Chris Christie 2%, John Kasich 2%, George Pataki 1%, Lindsey Graham 1%, Rand Paul 1%, Rick Santorum 0%, Unsure 5%
CBS News/YouGov Margin of error: ± 5.3% Sample size: 1252	December 14–17, 2015	Ted Cruz; 40%	Donald Trump; 31%	Marco Rubio; 12%	Ben Carson 6%, Jeb Bush 2%, Rand Paul 2%, Carly Fiorina 2%, Mike Huckabee 2%, Chris Christie 1%, John Kasich 1%, Rick Santorum 1%, Lindsey Graham 0%, Jim Gilmore 0%, George Pataki 0%, No preference 0%
Public Policy Polling Margin of error: ± 4.3% Sample size: 522	December 10–13, 2015	Donald Trump; 28%	Ted Cruz; 25%	Marco Rubio; 14%	Ben Carson 10%, Jeb Bush 7%, Carly Fiorina 3%, Chris Christie 3%, Mike Huckabee 3%, Rand Paul 2%, John Kasich 2%, Rick Santorum 1%, Lindsey Graham 1%, Jim Gilmore 0%, George Pataki 0%, Undecided 1%
Quinnipiac University Margin of error: ± 3.3% Sample size: 874	December 4–13, 2015	Donald Trump; 28%	Ted Cruz; 27%	Marco Rubio; 14%	Ben Carson 10%, Jeb Bush 5%, Rand Paul 4%, Carly Fiorina 3%, Chris Christie 3%, Mike Huckabee 1%, John Kasich 1%, Rick Santorum 0%, George Pataki 0%, Jim Gilmore 0%, Lindsey Graham 0%, DK 3%
Loras College Margin of error: ± 4.4% Sample size: 499	December 7–10, 2015	Ted Cruz; 29.7%	Donald Trump; 23.4%	Ben Carson; 10.8%	Marco Rubio 10.6%, Jeb Bush 6.2%, Carly Fiorina 3.4%, Rand Paul 2.4%, Mike Huckabee 1.8%, John Kasich 1.0%, Rick Santorum 1.0%, Chris Christie 0.4%, Lindsey Graham 0.0%, Undecided 9.0%
Fox News Margin of error: ± 4.5% Sample size: 450	December 7–10, 2015	Ted Cruz; 28%	Donald Trump; 26%	Marco Rubio; 13%	Ben Carson 10%, Jeb Bush 5%, Rand Paul 5%, Chris Christie 2%, Carly Fiorina 2%, Mike Huckabee 1%, John Kasich 1%, Rick Santorum 1%, George Pataki 1%, Jim Gilmore 0%, Lindsey Graham 0%, Uncommitted 1%, Other 1%, DK 3%
DMR/Bloomberg Margin of error: ± 4.9% Sample size: 400	December 7–10, 2015	Ted Cruz; 31%	Donald Trump; 21%	Ben Carson; 13%	Marco Rubio 10%, Jeb Bush 6%, Chris Christie 3%, Mike Huckabee 3%, Rand Paul 3%, John Kasich 2%, Carly Fiorina 1%, Rick Santorum 1%, Jim Gilmore 0%, Lindsey Graham 0%, George Pataki 0%, Uncommitted 3%, Undecided 4%
Monmouth University Margin of error: ± 4.8% Sample size: 425	December 3–6, 2015	Ted Cruz; 24%	Donald Trump; 19%	Marco Rubio; 17%	Ben Carson 13%, Jeb Bush 6%, Rand Paul 4%, Carly Fiorina 3%, John Kasich 3%, Chris Christie 2%, Mike Huckabee 2%, Rick Santorum 1%, Lindsey Graham <1%, George Pataki 0%, Jim Gilmore 0%, Uncommitted 1%, Undecided 4%
CNN/ORC Margin of error: ± 4.5% Sample size: 552	November 28- December 6, 2015	Donald Trump; 33%	Ted Cruz; 20%	Ben Carson; 16%	Marco Rubio 11%, Jeb Bush 4%, Carly Fiorina 3%, Rand Paul 3%, Chris Christie 2%, Mike Huckabee 2%, John Kasich 1%, Rick Santorum 1%, Lindsey Graham 0%, George Pataki 0%, Jim Gilmore 0%, No one 1%, Someone else 1%, No opinion 1%
Quinnipiac University Margin of error: ± 4.0% Sample size: 600	November 16–22, 2015	Donald Trump; 25%	Ted Cruz; 23%	Ben Carson; 18%	Marco Rubio 13%, Rand Paul 5%, Jeb Bush 4%, Carly Fiorina 3%, Chris Christie 2%, Rick Santorum 2%, Mike Huckabee 2%, John Kasich 1%, George Pataki 0%, Lindsey Graham 0%, Jim Gilmore 0%, DK/NA 2%
CBS News/YouGov Margin of error: ± 6.2% Sample size: ?	November 15–19, 2015	Donald Trump; 30%	Ted Cruz; 21%	Ben Carson; 19%	Marco Rubio 11%, Jeb Bush 5%, Carly Fiorina 4%, Chris Christie 2%, Rand Paul 2%, Rick Santorum 2%, Bobby Jindal 2%, John Kasich 1%, Mike Huckabee 1%, George Pataki 0%, Lindsey Graham 0%, Jim Gilmore 0%
Iowa State University/WHO-HD Margin of error: ± ? Sample size: 518	November 2–15, 2015	Ben Carson; 27%	Marco Rubio; 17%	Donald Trump; 15%	Ted Cruz 9%, Jeb Bush 5%, Rand Paul 3%, Carly Fiorina 2%, Mike Huckabee 1%, John Kasich 1%, Chris Christie 0%, Rick Santorum 0%, Lindsey Graham 0%
CNN/ORC Margin of error: ± 4.0% Sample size: 548	October 29 – November 4, 2015	Donald Trump; 25%	Ben Carson; 23%	Marco Rubio; 13%	Ted Cruz 11%, Jeb Bush 5%, Carly Fiorina 4%, Bobby Jindal 4%, Chris Christie 3%, Lindsey Graham 2%, John Kasich 2%, Rand Paul 2%, Mike Huckabee 2%, Rick Santorum 0%, George Pataki 0%, Jim Gilmore 0%, No opinion 3%
Gravis Marketing/One America News Network Margin of error: ± 5.0% Sample size: 356	October 30 – November 2, 2015	Donald Trump; 29.4%	Ben Carson; 22.4%	Marco Rubio; 18.0%	Ted Cruz 8.5%, Jeb Bush 6.0%, Carly Fiorina 5.2%, John Kasich 3.1%, Chris Christie 2.4%, Rand Paul 1.8%, Bobby Jindal 1.5%, Mike Huckabee 1.1%, Rick Santorum 0.4%, Lindsey Graham 0.3%
Public Policy Polling Margin of error: ± 3.9% Sample size: 638	October 30 – November 1, 2015	Donald Trump; 22%	Ben Carson; 21%	Ted Cruz; 14%	Marco Rubio 10%, Bobby Jindal 6%, Mike Huckabee 6%, Jeb Bush 5%, Carly Fiorina 5%, Chris Christie 3%, Rick Santorum 2%, John Kasich 2%, Rand Paul 2%, Lindsey Graham 0%, George Pataki 0%, Jim Gilmore 0%, Undecided 1%
KBUR/Monmouth University Margin of error: ± 3.37% Sample size: 874	October 29–31, 2015	Ben Carson; 27.5%	Donald Trump; 20.4%	Ted Cruz; 15.1%	Marco Rubio 10.1%, Jeb Bush 9.0%, Carly Fiorina 4.1%, Lindsey Graham 0.2%, Mike Huckabee 1.7%, John Kasich 1.9%, Rand Paul 1.6%, Chris Christie 2.3%, Bobby Jindal 1.3%, Rick Santorum 0.7%, Jim Gilmore 0.3%, George Pataki 0%, Undecided 3.8%
Monmouth University Margin of error: ± 4.9% Sample size: 400	October 22–25, 2015	Ben Carson; 32%	Donald Trump; 18%	Ted Cruz; 10%	Marco Rubio 10%, Jeb Bush 8%, Carly Fiorina 5%, Rand Paul 3%, Bobby Jindal 2%, Mike Huckabee 2%, John Kasich 2%, Rick Santorum 1%, Chris Christie 1%, Lindsey Graham 0%, George Pataki 0%, Jim Gilmore 0%, Other 0%, Uncommitted 1%, Undecided 5%
Loras College Margin of error: ± 4.4% Sample size: 500	October 19–22, 2015	Ben Carson; 30.6%	Donald Trump; 18.6%	Marco Rubio; 10.0%	Jeb Bush 6.8%, Ted Cruz 6.2%, Bobby Jindal 4.6%, Carly Fiorina 2.4%, Chris Christie 1.8%, Rand Paul 1.8%, John Kasich 1.4%, Mike Huckabee 1.2%, Rick Santorum 0.8%, Lindsey Graham 0.4%, George Pataki 0%, Undecided 12.8%
CBS News/YouGov Margin of error: ± 6.5% Sample size: ?	October 15–22, 2015	Donald Trump; 27%	Ben Carson; 27%	Ted Cruz; 12%	Marco Rubio 9%, Jeb Bush 6%, Carly Fiorina 3%, Rand Paul 3%, Mike Huckabee 2%, John Kasich 2%, Bobby Jindal 2%, Rick Santorum 2%, Chris Christie 1%, Lindsey Graham 0%, George Pataki 0%, Jim Gilmore 0%, No preference 3%
DMR/Bloomberg Margin of error: ± 4.9% Sample size: 401	October 16–21, 2015	Ben Carson; 28%	Donald Trump; 19%	Ted Cruz; 10%	Marco Rubio 9%, Rand Paul 5%, Jeb Bush 5%, Carly Fiorina 4%, Mike Huckabee 3%, John Kasich 2%, Bobby Jindal 2%, Rick Santorum 2%, Chris Christie 1%, Lindsey Graham 0%, George Pataki 0%, Jim Gilmore 0%, Not sure 7%, Uncommitted 3%
Quinnipiac University Margin of error: ± 4.1% Sample size: 574	October 14–20, 2015	Ben Carson; 28%	Donald Trump; 20%	Marco Rubio; 13%	Ted Cruz 10%, Rand Paul 6%, Carly Fiorina 5%, Jeb Bush 5%, John Kasich 3%, Bobby Jindal 3%, Mike Huckabee 2%, Chris Christie 1%, Rick Santorum 1%, Lindsey Graham 0%, George Pataki 0%, Jim Gilmore 0%, Undecided 3%
NBC/WSJ Margin of error: ± 4.7% Sample size: 431	October 2015	Donald Trump; 24%	Ben Carson; 19%	Carly Fiorina; 8%	Jeb Bush 7%, Ted Cruz 6%, Marco Rubio 6%, Bobby Jindal 6%, Mike Huckabee 5%, Rand Paul 4%, Chris Christie 4%, John Kasich 3%, Rick Santorum 1%, Lindsey Graham 1%, George Pataki <1%, Jim Gilmore <1%, Undecided 7%
Gravis Marketing Margin of error: ± 4.6% Sample size: 454	October 2, 2015	Donald Trump; 18.8%	Ben Carson; 14.1%	Ted Cruz; 10.6%	Carly Fiorina 9.7%, Marco Rubio 8.9%, Jeb Bush 6.9%, John Kasich 2.6%, Rand Paul 2.4%, Mike Huckabee 1.8%, Lindsey Graham 1.8%, Bobby Jindal 1.7%, Chris Christie 1.4%, Rick Santorum 1.3%, George Pataki 0.3%, Unsure 17.9%
Public Policy Polling Margin of error: ± 4.4% Sample size: 488	September 18–20, 2015	Donald Trump; 24%	Ben Carson; 17%	Carly Fiorina; 13%	Ted Cruz 8%, Marco Rubio 8%, Mike Huckabee 6%, Jeb Bush 6%, Scott Walker 5%, Rand Paul 4%, Bobby Jindal 4%, John Kasich 2%, Chris Christie 1%, Rick Santorum 1%, George Pataki 0%, Jim Gilmore 0%, Lindsey Graham 0%, Undecided 3%
CBS News/YouGov Margin of error: ± 5.7% Sample size: 705	September 3–10, 2015	Donald Trump; 29%	Ben Carson; 25%	Ted Cruz; 10%	Marco Rubio 6%, Scott Walker 5%, Carly Fiorina 4%, Mike Huckabee 4%, Rick Santorum 3%, Jeb Bush 3%, Bobby Jindal 2%, John Kasich 2%, Rand Paul 2%, Chris Christie 1%, Jim Gilmore 1%, Lindsey Graham 0%, George Pataki 0%, Rick Perry 0%, No preference 4%
Quinnipiac University Margin of error: ± 3.0% Sample size: 1038	August 27 – September 8, 2015	Donald Trump; 27%	Ben Carson; 21%	Ted Cruz; 9%	Jeb Bush 6%, Carly Fiorina 5%, Marco Rubio 5%, John Kasich 5%, Rand Paul 4%, Mike Huckabee 4%, Scott Walker 3%, Bobby Jindal 2%, Chris Christie 1%, Rick Santorum 1%, Rick Perry 1%, Lindsey Graham 1%, George Pataki 0%, Jim Gilmore 0%, Undecided 4%
NBC News/Marist Margin of error: ± 5.0% Sample size: 390	August 26 – September 2, 2015	Donald Trump; 29%	Ben Carson; 22%	Jeb Bush; 6%	Carly Fiorina 5%, Rand Paul 5%, Scott Walker 5%, Ted Cruz 4%, Marco Rubio 4%, Bobby Jindal 4%, Mike Huckabee 3%, Chris Christie 2%, John Kasich 2%, Rick Santorum 1%, Rick Perry 0%, Lindsey Graham 0%, George Pataki 0%, Jim Gilmore 0%, Undecided 8%
Gravis Marketing/One America Margin of error: ± 4.4% Sample size: 507	August 29–31, 2015	Donald Trump; 31.7%	Ben Carson; 15.8%	Ted Cruz; 6.9%	Marco Rubio 5.8%, Scott Walker 5.6%, Bobby Jindal 5.2%, Carly Fiorina 4.6%, Jeb Bush 4.1%, Mike Huckabee 2.6%, Chris Christie 2.0%, John Kasich 1.4%, Rand Paul 1.3%, Rick Perry 0.9%, Rick Santorum 0.6%, Lindsey Graham 0.4%, George Pataki 0.1%, Undecided 10.9%
Monmouth University Margin of error: ± 4.9% Sample size: 405	August 27–30, 2015	Donald Trump; 23%	Ben Carson; 23%	Carly Fiorina; 10%	Ted Cruz 9%, Scott Walker 7%, Jeb Bush 5%, John Kasich 4%, Marco Rubio 4%, Rand Paul 3%, Rick Santorum 2%, Bobby Jindal 1%, Chris Christie 1%, Rick Perry 1%, George Pataki 0%, Jim Gilmore 0%, Lindsey Graham 0%, Someone else 0%, Undecided 5%
Des Moines Register/Bloomberg/Selzer Margin of error: ± 4.9% Sample size: 400	August 23–26, 2015	Donald Trump; 23%	Ben Carson; 18%	Ted Cruz; 8%	Scott Walker 8%, Jeb Bush 6%, Marco Rubio 6%, Carly Fiorina 5%, Mike Huckabee 4%, Rand Paul 4%, Chris Christie 2%, Bobby Jindal 2%, John Kasich 2%, Rick Perry 1%, Rick Santorum 1%, George Pataki 0%, Jim Gilmore 0%, Lindsey Graham 0%, Someone else 0%, Undecided 10%
CNN/ORC Margin of error: ± 2% Sample size: 2,014	August 7–11, 2015	Donald Trump; 22%	Ben Carson; 14%	Scott Walker; 9%	Ted Cruz 8%, Carly Fiorina 7%, Mike Huckabee 7%, Jeb Bush 5%, Rand Paul 5%, Marco Rubio 5%, Chris Christie 3%, Lindsey Graham 2%, Bobby Jindal 2%, John Kasich 2%, Rick Perry 1%, Rick Santorum 1%, George Pataki 0%, Jim Gilmore 0%, Someone else 0%, No one 2%, No opinion 4%
NBC/Marist Margin of error: ± 5.3% Sample size: 342	July 14–21, 2015	Scott Walker; 19%	Donald Trump; 17%	Jeb Bush; 12%	Ben Carson 8%, Mike Huckabee 7%, Rand Paul 5%, Ted Cruz 4%, Marco Rubio 4%, Rick Perry 3%, Chris Christie 2%, John Kasich 2%, Bobby Jindal 1%, Carly Fiorina 1%, Lindsey Graham 1%, Rick Santorum 0%, George Pataki 0%, Jim Gilmore 0%, Undecided 14%
Quinnipiac University Margin of error: ± 3.8% Sample size: 666	June 20–29, 2015	Scott Walker; 18%	Ben Carson; 10%	Donald Trump; 10%	Ted Cruz 9%, Rand Paul 9%, Jeb Bush 8%, Marco Rubio 7%, Mike Huckabee 5%, Rick Perry 4%, Rick Santorum 4%, Carly Fiorina 3%, Bobby Jindal 3%, John Kasich 2%, Chris Christie 1%, Lindsey Graham 1%, George Pataki 0%, DK/NA 5%
Morning Consult Margin of error: ± ?% Sample size: 265	May 31 – June 8, 2015	Scott Walker; 18%	Jeb Bush; 10%	Mike Huckabee; 10%	Rand Paul 10%, Marco Rubio 7%, Chris Christie 6%, Ben Carson 5%, Donald Trump 5%, Ted Cruz 4%, Carly Fiorina 2%, Don't know/No opinion/Refused 21%, Someone else 3%
Gravis Marketing Margin of error: ± 5% Sample size: 364	May 28–29, 2015	Scott Walker; 17%	Marco Rubio; 13%	Ben Carson; 12%	Jeb Bush 10%, Mike Huckabee 8%, Ted Cruz 6%, Rick Santorum 6%, Carly Fiorina 5%, Chris Christie 4%, Rand Paul 4%, Unsure 15%
Des Moines Register Margin of error: ± 4.9% Sample size: 402	May 25–29, 2015	Scott Walker; 17%	Ben Carson; 10%	Rand Paul; 10%	Jeb Bush 9%, Mike Huckabee 9%, Marco Rubio 6%, Rick Santorum 6%, Ted Cruz 5%, Chris Christie 4%, Donald Trump 4%, Rick Perry 3%, Carly Fiorina 2%, John Kasich 2%, Lindsey Graham 1%, Bobby Jindal 1%, Uncommitted 4%, Not sure 7%
Quinnipiac University Margin of error: ± 3.8% Sample size: 667	April 25 – May 4, 2015	Scott Walker; 21%	Rand Paul; 13%	Marco Rubio; 13%	Ted Cruz 12%, Mike Huckabee 11%, Ben Carson 7%, Jeb Bush 5%, Chris Christie 3%, Rick Perry 3%, Carly Fiorina 2%, John Kasich 2%, Rick Santorum 2%, Bobby Jindal 1%, Lindsey Graham 0%, Don't know/No answer 6%
Public Policy Polling Margin of error: ± 4.6% Sample size: 462	April 23–26, 2015	Scott Walker; 23%	Marco Rubio; 13%	Jeb Bush; 12%	Mike Huckabee 10%, Rand Paul 10%, Ted Cruz 8%, Ben Carson 7%, Chris Christie 5%, Rick Perry 4%, Undecided 8%
Loras College Margin of error: ± 4.3% Sample size: 509	April 21–23, 2015	Scott Walker; 12.6%	Marco Rubio; 10%	Jeb Bush; 9.6%	Mike Huckabee 8.6%, Ted Cruz 6.5%, Ben Carson 6.3%, Rand Paul 6.3%, Chris Christie 5.1%, Rick Santorum 3.5%, Donald Trump 3.1%, Rick Perry 2.6%, Carly Fiorina 1%, Bobby Jindal 1%, John Kasich 1%, Lindsey Graham 0%, Undecided 22.8%
Gravis Marketing Margin of error: ± 5% Sample size: 388	April 13, 2015	Jeb Bush; 16%	Scott Walker; 13%	Marco Rubio; 12%	Ben Carson 9%, Rand Paul 9%, Mike Huckabee 8%, Ted Cruz 6%, Chris Christie 5%, Carly Fiorina 3%, Rick Santorum 2%, Undecided 17%
Opinion Savvy Margin of error: ± 4.16% Sample size: 552	March 20, 2015	Scott Walker; 29%	Ben Carson; 14%	Jeb Bush; 12%	Mike Huckabee 11%, Ted Cruz 7%, Chris Christie 5%, Rand Paul 5%, Marco Rubio 5%, Donald Trump 3%, Other/Undecided 10%
Quinnipiac University Margin of error: ± 3.9% Sample size: 623	February 16–23, 2015	Scott Walker; 25%	Rand Paul; 13%	Ben Carson; 11%	Mike Huckabee 11%, Jeb Bush 10%, Ted Cruz 5%, Marco Rubio 4%, Chris Christie 4%, Rick Santorum 4%, Rick Perry 3%, Bobby Jindal 2%, John Kasich 0%, Unsure 9%
Gravis Marketing Margin of error: ± 4% Sample size: 343	February 12–13, 2015	Scott Walker; 24%	Jeb Bush; 10%	Rand Paul; 10%	Chris Christie 9%, Mike Huckabee 7%, Marco Rubio 7%, Rick Santorum 6%, Ben Carson 5%, Ted Cruz 4%, Carly Fiorina 3%, Unsure 15%
NBC News/Marist Margin of error: ± 5.5% Sample size: 320	February 3–10, 2015	Mike Huckabee; 17%	Jeb Bush; 16%	Scott Walker; 15%	Chris Christie 9%, Rand Paul 7%, Ben Carson 6%, Marco Rubio 6%, Rick Santorum 5%, Rick Perry 4%, Ted Cruz 2%, Lindsey Graham 1%, Undecided 14%
Selzer & Co. Margin of error: ± 4.9% Sample size: 402	January 26–29, 2015	Scott Walker; 15%	Rand Paul; 14%	Mitt Romney; 13%	Mike Huckabee 10%, Ben Carson 9%, Jeb Bush 8%, Ted Cruz 5%, Chris Christie 4%, Rick Santorum 4%, Marco Rubio 3%, Rick Perry 3%, Bobby Jindal 2%, Carly Fiorina 1%, John Kasich 1%, Donald Trump 1%, Mike Pence 0%, Uncommitted 2%, Not sure 5%
Selzer & Co. Margin of error: ± 4.9% Sample size: 402	January 26–29, 2015	Scott Walker; 16%	Rand Paul; 15%	Mike Huckabee; 13%	Ben Carson 10%, Jeb Bush 9%, Chris Christie 6%, Ted Cruz 6%, Rick Santorum 5%, Marco Rubio 4%, Rick Perry 3%, Bobby Jindal 2%, Carly Fiorina 1%, John Kasich 1%, Donald Trump 1%, Mike Pence 0%, Uncommitted 3%, Not sure 5%
Loras College Margin of error: ± 5.5% Sample size: 316	January 21–26, 2015	Mitt Romney; 13.7%	Mike Huckabee; 12.5%	Ben Carson; 10.5%	Jeb Bush 9.9%, Scott Walker 8.3%, Rand Paul 6.7%, Ted Cruz 5.1%, Marco Rubio 4.2%, Chris Christie 3.8%, Rick Santorum 3.8%, Rick Perry 2.9%, Bobby Jindal 1.6%, Carly Fiorina 1%, John Kasich 1%, Lindsey Graham 0.3% Undecided 14.7%
Loras College Margin of error: ± 5.5% Sample size: 316	January 21–26, 2015	Mike Huckabee; 14.4%	Jeb Bush; 13.1%	Ben Carson; 12.8%	Scott Walker 9.9%, Rand Paul 7%, Chris Christie 5.4%, Ted Cruz 5.4%, Marco Rubio 4.2%, Rick Santorum 3.8%, Rick Perry 3.2%, Bobby Jindal 1.6%, Carly Fiorina 1.3%, John Kasich 1.3%, Lindsey Graham 0.6% Undecided 16%
Gravis Marketing Margin of error: ± 3% Sample size: 404	January 5–7, 2015	Mitt Romney; 21%	Jeb Bush; 14%	Scott Walker; 10%	Mike Huckabee 9%, Rand Paul 8%, Ted Cruz 7%, Chris Christie 5%, Paul Ryan 5%, Marco Rubio 4%, Undecided 18%

Polls in 2014

Poll source	Date	1st	2nd	3rd	Other
Fox News Margin of error: ± 5% Sample size: 329	October 28–30, 2014	Mike Huckabee; 13%	Ben Carson; 12%	Paul Ryan; 9%	Jeb Bush 8%, Rand Paul 8%, Chris Christie 7%, Ted Cruz 7%, Rick Santorum 6%, Marco Rubio 5%, Scott Walker 5%, Rick Perry 3%, Bobby Jindal 1%, John Kasich 1%, Rob Portman 0%, Other 1%, None of the above 4%, Don't know 10%
Reuters/Ipsos Margin of error: ± 4.0% Sample size: 602	October 23–29, 2014	Mitt Romney; 17%	Paul Ryan; 13%	Chris Christie; 12%	Jeb Bush 10%, Scott Walker 10%, Rand Paul 8%, Ted Cruz 7%, Marco Rubio 6%, Rick Santorum 6%, Rick Perry 5%, Wouldn't vote 7%
Selzer & Co. Margin of error: ± 4.8% Sample size: 425	October 1–7, 2014	Mitt Romney; 17%	Ben Carson; 11%	Rand Paul; 10%	Mike Huckabee 9%, Paul Ryan 8%, Ted Cruz 7%, Rick Perry 7%, Chris Christie 6%, Jeb Bush 4%, Scott Walker 4%, Rick Santorum 3%, Marco Rubio 2%, Bobby Jindal 1%, John Kasich 1%, Mike Pence 0%, Rob Portman 0%, Uncommitted 1%, Not sure 9%
CNN/ORC Margin of error: ± 5.5% Sample size: 310	September 8–10, 2014	Mike Huckabee; 21%	Paul Ryan; 12%	Rand Paul; 7%	Jeb Bush 6%, Chris Christie 6%, Rick Perry 5%, Marco Rubio 5%, Scott Walker 5%, Ted Cruz 4%, Bobby Jindal 4%, Rick Santorum 3%
Suffolk University Margin of error: ± 6.83% Sample size: 206	August 23–26, 2014	Mike Huckabee; 13.11%	Chris Christie; 10.68%	Rick Perry; 8.74%	Jeb Bush 7.28%, Rand Paul 6.8%, Paul Ryan 6.31%, Rick Santorum 5.83%, Marco Rubio 5.34%, Ted Cruz 4.85%, Scott Walker 4.37%, Bobby Jindal 2.91%, Jon Huntsman Jr. 0.97%, John Kasich 0.97%, Other 4.37%, Undecided 16.99%, Refused 0.49%
Suffolk University Margin of error: ± 6.83% Sample size: 206	August 23–26, 2014	Mitt Romney; 35.29%	Mike Huckabee; 8.82%	Chris Christie; 6.47%	Rick Santorum 5.88%, Ted Cruz 5.29%, Rand Paul 5.29%, Jeb Bush 4.71, Rick Perry 4.71%, Paul Ryan 4.12%, Scott Walker 3.53%, Marco Rubio 2.35%, Bobby Jindal 1.76%, Jon Huntsman Jr. 1.18%, John Kasich 0.59%, Undecided 10%
NBC News/Marist Margin of error: ± 4.1% Sample size: 558	July 7–13, 2014	Jeb Bush; 12%	Rand Paul; 12%	Paul Ryan; 11%	Rick Santorum 9%, Chris Christie 8%, Ted Cruz 7%, Rick Perry 7%, Marco Rubio 7%, Scott Walker 5%, Bobby Jindal 1%, Undecided 20%
Vox Populi Polling Margin of error: ± 6.6% Sample size: 222	June 4–5, 2014	Jeb Bush; 18%	Mike Huckabee; 15%	Paul Ryan; 13%	Rand Paul 12%, Marco Rubio 11%, Rick Santorum 10%, Ted Cruz 9%, Chris Christie 6%, Scott Walker 6%
Public Policy Polling Margin of error: ± 5.6% Sample size: 303	May 15–19, 2014	Mike Huckabee; 20%	Ted Cruz; 15%	Jeb Bush; 12%	Rand Paul 10%, Chris Christie 9%, Paul Ryan 8%, Scott Walker 6%, Marco Rubio 4%, Rick Santorum 3%, Someone else/Not sure 13%
The Daily Caller/Vox Populi Polling Margin of error: ± 8.4% Sample size: 168	April 22–24, 2014	Mike Huckabee; 20%	Paul Ryan; 19%	Jeb Bush; 18%	Ted Cruz 9%, Marco Rubio 9%, Rand Paul 8%, Chris Christie 7%, Scott Walker 6%, Joe Scarborough 4%
Magellan Strategies Margin of error: ± 5% Sample size: 330	April 14–15, 2014	Jeb Bush; 17%	Mike Huckabee; 17%	Chris Christie; 14%	Rand Paul 11%, Ted Cruz 10%, Scott Walker 8%, John Kasich 5%, Marco Rubio 2%, Undecided 16%
Loras College Margin of error: ± 4% Sample size: 600	April 7–8, 2014	Mike Huckabee; 14.7%	Jeb Bush; 10.7%	Rand Paul; 8.5%	Paul Ryan 8.3%, Chris Christie 8%, Ted Cruz 6.2%, Marco Rubio 4.7%, Rick Santorum 4.7%, Scott Walker 4.7%, Rick Perry 3%, John Kasich 0.7%, Other 0.7%, Undecided 23.8%
Suffolk University Margin of error: ± 8.7% Sample size: 127	April 3–8, 2014	Mike Huckabee; 11.02%	Jeb Bush; 10.24%	Rand Paul; 10.24%	Ted Cruz 9.45%, Ben Carson 8.66%, Chris Christie 7.09%, Paul Ryan 6.3%, Sarah Palin 5.51%, Condoleezza Rice 5.51%, Marco Rubio 5.51%, Rick Santorum 5.51%, Scott Walker 5.51%, Bobby Jindal 3.15%, Rick Perry 3.15%, Undecided 3.15%
WPA Research Margin of error: ± ? Sample size: 402	March 30, 2014	Mike Huckabee; 14%	Rand Paul; 10%	Scott Walker; 8%	Jeb Bush 7%, Ted Cruz 7%, Paul Ryan 7%, Chris Christie 6%, Rick Santorum 5%, Rick Perry 3%, Marco Rubio 3%, Bobby Jindal 2%, Other 2%, Undecided 26%
Public Policy Polling Margin of error: ± 5.8% Sample size: 283	February 20–23, 2014	Mike Huckabee; 17%	Rand Paul; 14%	Jeb Bush; 13%	Chris Christie 10%, Ted Cruz 10%, Paul Ryan 9%, Bobby Jindal 7%, Scott Walker 7%, Marco Rubio 3%, Other/Undecided 11%

Polls in 2013-2012

Poll source	Date	1st	2nd	3rd	Other
Cygnal Margin of error: ± 2.37% Sample size: 1,705	July 10–12, 2013	Marco Rubio; 11.4%	Rand Paul; 10.5%	Paul Ryan; 9.3%	Jeb Bush 8.7%, Chris Christie 7.7%, Rick Santorum 6.7%, Ted Cruz 6.1%, Scott Walker 2.1%, Bobby Jindal 1.3%, Undecided 36.3%
Public Policy Polling Margin of error: ± 6.2% Sample size: 250	July 5–7, 2013	Rand Paul; 18%	Chris Christie; 16%	Paul Ryan; 15%	Jeb Bush 14%, Marco Rubio 11%, Ted Cruz 10%, Rick Santorum 6%, Bobby Jindal 2%, Susana Martinez 1%, Other/Undecided 7%
Public Policy Polling Margin of error: ± 5.4% Sample size: 326	Feb. 1–3, 2013	Mike Huckabee; 16%	Marco Rubio; 16%	Rand Paul; 15%	Jeb Bush 14%, Chris Christie 12%, Paul Ryan 10%, Susana Martinez 4%, Bobby Jindal 3%, Rick Perry 3%, Someone Else/Undecided 7%
Public Policy Polling Margin of error: 5.1% Sample size: 363	July 12–15, 2012	Rick Santorum; 17%	Mike Huckabee; 17%	Chris Christie; 16%	Rand Paul 11%, Marco Rubio 10%, Jeb Bush 8%, Paul Ryan 6%, Sarah Palin 4%, Scott Walker 4%, Someone else/Not sure 8%
Public Policy Polling Margin of error: 5.3% Sample size: 346	May 3–5, 2012	Rick Santorum; 16%	Mike Huckabee; 16%	Chris Christie; 15%	Jeb Bush 10%, Sarah Palin 10%, Rand Paul 9%, Marco Rubio 7%, Paul Ryan 5% Someone else/Not sure 10%

== Kansas ==
Winner: Ted Cruz
Caucus date: March 5, 2016

Poll source	Date	1st	2nd	3rd	Other
Caucus results	March 5, 2016	Ted Cruz; 47.50%	Donald Trump; 23.35%	Marco Rubio; 16.83%	John Kasich 11.07%, Ben Carson 0.74%, Jeb Bush 0.11%, Carly Fiorina 0.05%
Trafalgar Group Margin of error: ± 2.96% Sample size: 1,060	March 2–3, 2016	Donald Trump; 35.18%	Ted Cruz; 29.31%	Marco Rubio; 16.56%	John Kasich 12.66%, Undecided 6.29%
Fort Hays State University Margin of error: ± 5.0% Sample size: 440	February 26, 2016	Donald Trump; 26%	Ted Cruz; 14%	Marco Rubio; 13%	John Kasich 3%, Ben Carson 3%, Other 2%, Undecided 39%
Suffolk University Margin of error: ± ? Sample size: 118	September 27–30, 2014	Jeb Bush; 15.36%	Mike Huckabee; 14.23%	Chris Christie; 8.99%	Ted Cruz 7.87%, Rick Perry 6.74%, Paul Ryan 5.99%, Rand Paul 5.62%, Marco Rubio 5.62%, Scott Walker 3.75%, Rick Santorum 1.5%, Bobby Jindal 1.12%, John Kasich 0.75%, Carly Fiorina 0.37%, Other 4.12%, Undecided/Refused 17.97%
Suffolk University Margin of error: ± ? Sample size: 118	September 27–30, 2014	Mitt Romney; 33.33%	Jeb Bush; 10.5%	Mike Huckabee; 10.5%	Ted Cruz 6.85%, Chris Christie 6.39%, Rick Perry 5.02%, Rand Paul 4.57%, Marco Rubio 4.11%, Paul Ryan 2.74%, Scott Walker 2.28%, Rick Santorum 1.83%, Bobby Jindal 1.37%, Carly Fiorina 0.46%, John Kasich 0.46%, Undecided/Refused 9.59%
Public Policy Polling Margin of error: ±5.1% Sample size: 375	February 18–20, 2014	Mike Huckabee; 20%	Jeb Bush; 13%	Chris Christie; 13%	Ted Cruz 12%, Rand Paul 11%, Paul Ryan 7%, Marco Rubio 5%, Scott Walker 4%, Bobby Jindal 2%, Someone Else/Undecided 13%

== Kentucky ==
Winner: Donald Trump
Caucus date: March 5, 2016

Poll source	Date	1st	2nd	3rd	Other
Caucus results	March 5, 2016	Donald Trump; 35.92%	Ted Cruz; 31.57%	Marco Rubio; 16.36%	John Kasich 14.42%, Ben Carson 0.85%, Rand Paul 0.38%, Jeb Bush 0.13%, Mike Huckabee 0.08%, Carly Fiorina 0.03%, Chris Christie 0.03%, Rick Santorum 0.01%
Western Kentucky University Margin of error: ± 4.3% Sample size: 532	February 22–26, 2016	Donald Trump; 35%	Marco Rubio; 22%	Ted Cruz; 15%	Ben Carson 7%, John Kasich 6%
Public Policy Polling Margin of error: ± 4.8% Sample size: 413	June 18–21, 2015	Rand Paul; 19%	Jeb Bush; 13%	Donald Trump; 12%	Scott Walker 11%, Mike Huckabee 10%, Marco Rubio 10%, Ben Carson 7%, Ted Cruz 4%, Carly Fiorina 4%, Someone else/Not sure 9%
Courier-Journal/SurveyUSA Margin of error: ± 4.4% Sample size: 517	May 5–10, 2015	Rand Paul; 26%	Mike Huckabee; 15%	Jeb Bush; 12%	Scott Walker 10%, Ben Carson 7%, Marco Rubio 6%, Ted Cruz 6%, Chris Christie 2%, Rick Perry, 2%, Rick Santorum 2%, Bobby Jindal 2%, Carly Fiorina 1%, Other 2%, Undecided 8%
Public Policy Polling Margin of error: ± 5% Sample size: 383	August 7–10, 2014	Rand Paul; 25%	Mike Huckabee; 18%	Jeb Bush; 15%	Chris Christie 8%, Marco Rubio 8%, Ted Cruz 7%, Scott Walker 5%, Paul Ryan 4%, Bobby Jindal 3%, Someone else/Not sure 6%
Public Policy Polling Margin of error: ± 4.2% Sample size: 540	December 12–15, 2013	Rand Paul; 34%	Jeb Bush; 20%	Chris Christie; 12%	Ted Cruz 7%, Marco Rubio 5%, Paul Ryan 5%, Bobby Jindal 3%, Rick Santorum 2%, Scott Walker 2%, Someone Else/Undecided 10%
Public Policy Polling Margin of error: ± 5.5% Sample size: 320	April 5–7, 2013	Rand Paul; 31%	Marco Rubio; 17%	Jeb Bush; 13%	Chris Christie 10%, Bobby Jindal 4%, Paul Ryan 3%, Rick Perry 2%, Rick Santorum 2%, Susana Martinez 1%, Someone Else/Undecided 16%

== Louisiana ==
Winner: Donald Trump
Primary date: March 5, 2016

Poll source	Date	1st	2nd	3rd	Other
Primary results	March 5, 2016	Donald Trump; 41.45%	Ted Cruz; 37.83%	Marco Rubio; 11.22%	John Kasich 6.43%, Ben Carson 1.51%, Jeb Bush 0.71%, Rand Paul 0.22%, Mike Huckabee 0.21%, Chris Christie 0.13%, Carly Fiorina 0.08%, Rick Santorum 0.06%, Lindsey Graham 0.05%
Gravis Marketing/ One America News Margin of error: ± 3% Sample size: 1356	March 3, 2016	Donald Trump; 48%	Ted Cruz; 31%	Marco Rubio; 15%	John Kasich 6%
University of New Orleans Margin of error: ± 2.26% Sample size: 1874	March 2, 2016	Donald Trump; 38%	Ted Cruz; 26%	Marco Rubio; 11%	John Kasich 5%, Don't Care 20%
Trafalgar Group Margin of error: ± 2.73% Sample size: 1509	March 1–2, 2016	Donald Trump; 44.15%	Ted Cruz; 25.92%	Marco Rubio; 14.84%	Ben Carson 5.72%, John Kasich 5.17%, Undecided 4.2%
Magellan Strategies Margin of error: ± 3.9% Sample size: 609	March 1, 2016	Donald Trump; 41%	Ted Cruz; 21%	Marco Rubio; 15%	John Kasich 9%, Ben Carson 5%
WWL-TV/Advocate Margin of error: ± 3.46% Sample size: 800	September 20–23, 2015	Ben Carson; 23%	Donald Trump 19%	Jeb Bush; 10%	Marco Rubio 9%, Carly Fiorina 7%, Ted Cruz 6%, Mike Huckabee 4%, Bobby Jindal 3%, John Kasich 3%, Chris Christie 2%, Others 1%, Undecided 13%
Opinion Savvy/Insider Advantage Margin of error: ± 4.4% Sample size: 490	August 2, 2015	Donald Trump; 28.9%	Jeb Bush; 16.6%	Mike Huckabee; 9.8%	Ted Cruz 9.4%, Ben Carson 8.4%, Bobby Jindal 6%, Scott Walker 4.3%, Marco Rubio 3.8% John Kasich 2.6%, Chris Christie 2.4%, Rick Perry 2.1%, Carly Fiorina 1.5%, Rand Paul 1%, Lindsey Graham 0.3%, Rick Santourm 0.1%, George Pataki 0%, Someone else 0.8%, Undecided 2.1%
Public Policy Polling Margin of error: ± 5.6% Sample size: 308	June 26–29, 2014	Ted Cruz; 19%	Jeb Bush; 17%	Mike Huckabee; 17%	Bobby Jindal 12%, Rand Paul 10%, Chris Christie 6%, Marco Rubio 4%, Paul Ryan 4%, Scott Walker 3%, Other/Undecided 8%
Magellan Strategies Margin of error: ± 6% Sample size: 270	February 6–9, 2014	Jeb Bush; 25%	Mike Huckabee; 17%	Ted Cruz; 13%	Rand Paul 9%, Marco Rubio 9%, Chris Christie 8%, Scott Walker 4%, John Kasich 2% Undecided 13%
Public Policy Polling Margin of error: ± 5.6% Sample size: 309	February 6–9, 2014	Mike Huckabee; 20%	Bobby Jindal; 13%	Ted Cruz; 12%	Rand Paul 10%, Jeb Bush 9%, Chris Christie 8%, Paul Ryan 8%, Marco Rubio 7%, Scott Walker 2%, Someone Else/Undecided 12%
Public Policy Polling Margin of error: ± 5.9% Sample size: 274	Aug. 16–19, 2013	Rand Paul; 18%	Jeb Bush; 17%	Paul Ryan; 11%	Chris Christie 10%, Bobby Jindal 10%, Ted Cruz 8%, Marco Rubio 8%, Rick Santorum 5%, Susana Martinez 0%, Someone Else/Undecided 13%
Public Policy Polling Margin of error: ± 4% Sample size: 603	Feb. 8–12, 2013	Marco Rubio; 21%	Mike Huckabee; 18%	Bobby Jindal; 14%	Chris Christie 11%, Jeb Bush 9%, Rand Paul 8%, Paul Ryan 7%, Rick Perry 3%, Susana Martinez 1%, Someone Else/Undecided 7%

== Maine ==
Winner: Ted Cruz
Caucus date: March 5, 2016

Poll source	Date	1st	2nd	3rd	Other
Caucus results	March 5, 2016	Ted Cruz; 45.90%	Donald Trump; 32.59%	John Kasich; 12.19%	Marco Rubio 8.01%, Ben Carson 0.71%, Rand Paul 0.30%, Jeb Bush 0.17%, Carly Fiorina 0.09%, Mike Huckabee 0.05%
Public Policy Polling Margin of error: ±5.4% Sample size: 331	November 8–11, 2013	Chris Christie; 27%	Ted Cruz; 14%	Jeb Bush; 12%	Rand Paul 10%, Paul Ryan 9%, Marco Rubio 4%, Bobby Jindal 2%, Rick Santorum 1%, Scott Walker 1%, Someone Else/Undecided 20%

== Maryland ==
Winner: Donald Trump
Primary date: April 26, 2016

Poll source	Date	1st	2nd	3rd	Other
Primary results	April 26, 2016	Donald Trump; 54.45%	John Kasich; 23.03%	Ted Cruz; 18.88%	Ben Carson 1.30%, Marco Rubio 0.68%, Jeb Bush 0.56%, Rand Paul 0.34%, Chris Christie 0.27%, Carly Fiorina 0.22%, Mike Huckabee 0.18%, Rick Santorum 0.10%
ARG Margin of error: ± 5% Sample size: 400	April 21–24, 2016	Donald Trump; 55%	John Kasich; 21%	Ted Cruz; 19%	Undecided 5%
Public Policy Polling Margin of error: ± 5.7% Sample size: 310	April 15–17, 2016	Donald Trump; 43%	John Kasich; 29%	Ted Cruz; 24%	Undecided 5%
Monmouth University Margin of error: ± 5.7% Sample size: 301	April 10–11, 2016	Donald Trump; 47%	John Kasich; 27%	Ted Cruz; 19%	Other 1%, Undecided 7%
NBC4/Marist Margin of error: ± 5.1% Sample size: 368	April 5–9, 2016	Donald Trump; 41%	Ted Cruz; 29%	John Kasich; 24%	Other 1%, Undecided 6%
Washington Post/University of Maryland Margin of error: ± 7.5% Sample size: 283	March 30–April 3, 2016	Donald Trump; 41%	John Kasich; 31%	Ted Cruz; 22%	Other 6%
Baltimore Sun/University of Baltimore Margin of error: ± 4.9% Sample size: 400	March 4–8, 2016	Donald Trump; 34%	Ted Cruz; 25%	John Kasich; 18%	Marco Rubio 14%, Other 1%, Undecided 9%
Gonzales Research Margin of error: ± 5.8% Sample size: 301	January 11–16, 2016	Donald Trump; 31.9%	Ted Cruz; 15.0%	Marco Rubio; 13.6%	Ben Carson 9.3%, Chris Christie 8.0%, Jeb Bush 4.0%, Someone else 5.6%, Undecided 12.6%
Baltimore Sun/University of Baltimore Margin of error: ± 5.6% Sample size: 307	November 13–17, 2015	Ben Carson; 27%	Donald Trump; 23%	Marco Rubio; 16%	Ted Cruz 10%, John Kasich 4%, Chris Christie 3%, Carly Fiorina 3%, Jeb Bush 3%, Mike Huckabee 1%, Rand Paul 1%, Other/Unsure 9%
Baltimore Sun Margin of error: ± 4.4% Sample size: 499	February 8–12, 2014	Ben Carson; 24%	Jeb Bush; 15%	Chris Christie; 14%	Rand Paul 14%, Marco Rubio 12%, Undecided/Other 21%

== Massachusetts ==
Winner: Donald Trump
Primary date: March 1, 2016

Poll source	Date	1st	2nd	3rd	Other
Primary results	March 1, 2016	Donald Trump; 48.99%	John Kasich; 17.94%	Marco Rubio; 17.75%	Ted Cruz 9.50%, Ben Carson 2.57%, Jeb Bush 1.03%, Chris Christie 0.30%, Rand Paul 0.29%, Carly Fiorina 0.18%, Jim Gilmore 0.12%, Mike Huckabee 0.11%, Mike Huckabee 0.08%, George Pataki 0.08%, Rick Santorum 0.05%
Emerson College Margin of error: ± 4.8% Sample size: 408	February 26–28, 2016	Donald Trump; 51%	Marco Rubio; 20%	John Kasich; 14%	Ted Cruz 10%, Ben Carson 1%, Undecided 1%
UMass Amherst/WBZ Margin of error: ± 6.3% Sample size: 292	February 24–26, 2016	Donald Trump; 47%	Marco Rubio; 15%	Ted Cruz; 15%	John Kasich 11%, Ben Carson 2%, Other 7%, Don't Know 3%
Suffolk University Margin of error: ± 4.4% Sample size: 500	February 24–26, 2016	Donald Trump; 42.6%	Marco Rubio; 19.8%	John Kasich; 17%	Ted Cruz 8.8%, Ben Carson 3.8%, Other 1%, Don't Know 7%
MassINC/WBUR Margin of error: ± 4.9% Sample size: 386	February 21–23, 2016	Donald Trump; 39%	Marco Rubio; 18%	John Kasich; 17%	Ted Cruz 9%, Ben Carson 5%, Don't Know 12%
Emerson College Margin of error: ± 5.7% Sample size: 289	February 19–21, 2016	Donald Trump; 50%	Marco Rubio; 16%	John Kasich; 13%	Ted Cruz 10%, Ben Carson 2%
Suffolk University Margin of error: ± ?% Sample size: 134	November 19–22, 2015	Donald Trump; 32%	Marco Rubio; 18%	Ted Cruz 10%	Jeb Bush 7%, Ben Carson 5%, Carly Fiorina 4%, Chris Christie 4%, John Kasich 2%, Rand Paul 1%, Mike Huckabee 0%, Rick Santorum 0%, Lindsey Graham 0%, George Pataki 0%, Jim Gilmore 0%, Undecided 14%
Emerson College Margin of error: ± 5.9% Sample size: 271	October 16–18, 2015	Donald Trump; 47.8%	Ben Carson; 13.9%	Marco Rubio; 11.8%	Jeb Bush 7.1%, Carly Fiorina 6.5%, Ted Cruz 5.1%, John Kasich 2.8%, Chris Christie 2.3%, Lindsey Graham 0.9%, Mike Huckabee 0.4%, Rand Paul 0.1%, Undecided 1.4%
Emerson College Margin of error: ± ? Sample size: 216	March 14–19, 2015	Jeb Bush; 19%	Scott Walker; 19%	Ben Carson; 13%	Rand Paul 7%, Chris Christie 6%, Ted Cruz 6%, Mike Huckabee 3%, Other/Undecided 28%
Suffolk University Margin of error: ± 4.9% Sample size: 400	August 21–24, 2014	Chris Christie; 11%	Paul Ryan; 11%	Jeb Bush; 10.75%	Rand Paul 10.5%, Mike Huckabee 7%, Scott Walker 6.75%, Marco Rubio 5.75%, Rick Perry 4.75%, Ted Cruz 4.25%, Bobby Jindal 3.5%, Rick Santorum 2.75%, Jon Huntsman Jr. 1.75%, John Kasich 1%, Undecided 18.25%, Other 0.5%, Refused 0.5%
Suffolk University Margin of error: ± 4.9% Sample size: 400	August 21–24, 2014	Mitt Romney; 48.62%	Chris Christie; 7.69%	Paul Ryan; 5.54%	Jeb Bush 5.23%, Ted Cruz 3.69%, Jon Huntsman Jr. 3.38%, Bobby Jindal 3.38%, Rand Paul 3.38%, Scott Walker 3.38%, Mike Huckabee 3.08%, Marco Rubio 2.77%, Rick Perry 1.54%, John Kasich 1.23%, Rick Santorum 1.23%, Undecided 4.92%, Refused 0.92%

== Michigan ==
Winner: Donald Trump
Primary date: March 8, 2016

Poll source	Date	1st	2nd	3rd	Other
Primary results	March 8, 2016	Donald Trump; 36.55%	Ted Cruz; 24.68%	John Kasich; 24.26%	Marco Rubio 9.34%, Ben Carson 1.61%, Jeb Bush 0.81%, Rand Paul 0.29%, Chris Christie 0.24%, Mike Huckabee 0.20%, Rick Santorum 0.13%, Carly Fiorina 0.11%, George Pataki 0.04%, Lindsey Graham 0.03%
FOX 2 Detroit/ Mitchell Research Margin of error: ± 4.5% Sample size: 472	March 7, 2016	Donald Trump; 41%	John Kasich; 23%	Ted Cruz; 18%	Marco Rubio 8%, Ben Carson 3%, Other 1%, Undecided 6%
FOX 2 Detroit/ Mitchell Research Margin of error: ± 3.8% Sample size: 663	March 6, 2016	Donald Trump; 42%	John Kasich; 19.6%	Ted Cruz; 19.3%	Marco Rubio 9%, Ben Carson 4%, Other 1%, Undecided 5%
Trafalgar Group Margin of error: ± 2.42% Sample size: 1610	March 5–6, 2016	Donald Trump; 40.89%	Ted Cruz; 23.26%	John Kasich; 23.04%	Marco Rubio 8.34%, Undecided 4.47%
Monmouth University Margin of error: ± 4.9% Sample size: 402	March 3–6, 2016	Donald Trump; 36%	Ted Cruz; 23%	John Kasich; 21%	Marco Rubio 13%, Other 1%, Undecided 5%
ARG Margin of error: ± 5% Sample size: 400	March 4–5, 2016	John Kasich; 33%	Donald Trump; 31%	Ted Cruz; 15%	Marco Rubio 11%, Ben Carson 6%, Other 1%, Undecided 4%
CBS News/YouGov Margin of error: ± 5.9% Sample size: 638	March 2–4, 2016	Donald Trump; 39%	Ted Cruz; 24%	Marco Rubio; 16%	John Kasich 15%, Ben Carson 5%
NBC News/WSJ/Marist Margin of error: ± 3.3% Sample size: 877	March 1–3, 2016	Donald Trump; 41%	Ted Cruz; 22%	Marco Rubio; 17%	John Kasich 13%, Uncommitted 2%, Other 2%, Undecided 5%
Trafalgar Group Margin of error: ± 2.42% Sample size: 1643	March 2–3, 2016	Donald Trump; 41.87%	Ted Cruz; 20.45%	John Kasich; 18.14%	Marco Rubio 13.79%, Undecided 5.75%
Michigan State University Margin of error: ± 5.8% Sample size: 262	January 25 – March 3, 2016	Donald Trump; 36.1%	Ted Cruz; 19.5%	Marco Rubio; 18.1%	John Kasich 8.9%, Other 7%
FOX 2 Detroit/ Mitchell Research Margin of error: ± 3.86% Sample size: 643	March 2, 2016	Donald Trump; 42%	Ted Cruz; 19%	Marco Rubio; 15%	John Kasich 14%, Ben Carson 5%, Other 1%, Undecided 5%
FOX 2 Detroit/ Mitchell Research Margin of error: ± 3.76% Sample size: 679	March 1, 2016	Donald Trump; 39%	Marco Rubio; 19%	Ted Cruz; 14%	John Kasich 12%, Ben Carson 9%, Other 2%, Undecided 7%
EPIC/MRA Margin of error: ± 4.9% Sample size: 400	February 27–29, 2016	Donald Trump; 29%	Ted Cruz; 19%	Marco Rubio; 18%	John Kasich 8%, Ben Carson 8%, Undecided 18%
MRG Margin of error: ± ?% Sample size: 217	February 22–27, 2016	Donald Trump; 33%	Marco Rubio; 18%	Ted Cruz; 18%	John Kasich 10%, Ben Carson 9%, Other/Undecided 12%
Target Insyght Margin of error: ± 5% Sample size: 400	February 22–24, 2016	Donald Trump; 41%	Marco Rubio; 17%	Ted Cruz; 14%	John Kasich 12%, Ben Carson 8%, Undecided 6%
FOX 2 Detroit/ Mitchell Research Margin of error: ± 4.57% Sample size: 459	February 23, 2016	Donald Trump; 41%	Marco Rubio; 19%	Ted Cruz; 16%	John Kasich 11%, Ben Carson 7%, Other 1%, Undecided 5%
ARG Margin of error: ± 5% Sample size: 400	February 19–20, 2016	Donald Trump; 35%	John Kasich; 17%	Ted Cruz/ Marco Rubio; 12%	Ben Carson 9%, Jeb Bush 4%, Other 1%, Undecided 10%
Detroit News/WDIV-TV Margin of error: ± 4% Sample size: 600	February 14–16, 2016	Donald Trump; 25.2%	Ted Cruz; 15%	Marco Rubio; 11.8%	John Kasich 10.5%, Ben Carson 9%, Jeb Bush 5.3%, Refused 1.9%, Undecided 21.3%
FOX 2 Detroit/ Mitchell Research Margin of error: ± 4.94% Sample size: 394	February 15, 2016	Donald Trump; 41%	Ted Cruz; 11%	John Kasich; 11%	Marco Rubio 10%, Ben Carson 7%, Jeb Bush 5%, Undecided 14%
FOX 2 Detroit/ Mitchell Research Margin of error: ± 5.39% Sample size: 330	February 4, 2016	Donald Trump; 41%	Marco Rubio; 20%	Ted Cruz; 16%	Ben Carson 9%, John Kasich 6%, Jeb Bush 2%, Chris Christie 2%, Someone Else 2%, Not Sure 7%
Target-Insyght/ MIRS/IMP Margin of error: ± 5% Sample size: 400	February 2–4, 2016	Donald Trump; 35%	Marco Rubio; 21%	Ted Cruz; 21%	John Kasich 6%, Ben Carson 5%, Jeb Bush 3%, Chris Christie 3%, Carly Fiorina 3%, Undecided 4%
Mitchell Research Margin of error: ± 4.41% Sample size: 493	January 25, 2016	Donald Trump; 51%	Ted Cruz; 15%	Marco Rubio; 12%	Ben Carson 5%, Jeb Bush 5%, Chris Christie 5%, Someone else 3%, undecided 5%
MRG Margin of error: ± 4% Sample size: 600	September 9–14, 2015	Ben Carson; 24%	Donald Trump; 22%	Jeb Bush; 8%	Mike Huckabee 6%, Marco Rubio 4%, Ted Cruz 3%, Carly Fiorina 3%, John Kasich 2%, Scott Walker 2%, Rand Paul 2%, Chris Christie 1%, Undecided 21%
Mitchell Poll Margin of error: ± 5% Sample size: 432	August 10, 2015	Donald Trump; 20%	Carly Fiorina; 15%	Ben Carson; 12%	Jeb Bush 12%, Marco Rubio 10%, Ted Cruz 8%, John Kasich 8%, Chris Christie 4%, Mike Huckabee 4%, Scott Walker 4%, Rand Paul 2%
Public Policy Polling Margin of error: ± 4.5% Sample size: 465	June 25–28, 2015	Scott Walker; 15%	Jeb Bush; 14%	Ben Carson; 14%	Donald Trump 14%, Marco Rubio 9%, Mike Huckabee 8%, Chris Christie 5%, Ted Cruz 5%, Rand Paul 4%, Carly Fiorina 3%, John Kasich 3%, Rick Santorum 2%, Lindsey Graham 1%, Rick Perry 1%, Bobby Jindal 0%, George Pataki 0%, Some else/Not sure 2%
MIRS Margin of error: ± 6.5% Sample size: 366	February 18–20, 2015	Scott Walker; 43%	Jeb Bush; 19%	Rand Paul; 12%	Ben Carson 10%, Chris Christie 3%, Marco Rubio 3%, Rick Santorum 3%, Mike Huckabee 3%
Suffolk University Margin of error: ± 7% Sample size: 188	September 6–10, 2014	Jeb Bush; 11.17%	Mike Huckabee; 11.17%	Marco Rubio; 9.57%	Rand Paul 6.91%, Chris Christie 6.38%, Scott Walker 6.38%, Rick Perry 6.38%, Paul Ryan 5.85%, Ted Cruz 5.32%, Rick Santorum 5.32%, Bobby Jindal 2.66%, Jon Huntsman Jr. 2.13%, John Kasich 0.53%, Undecided 17.02%, Refused 2.13%, Other 1.06%
Suffolk University Margin of error: ± 7% Sample size: 188	September 6–10, 2014	Mitt Romney; 39.47%	Jeb Bush; 9.87%	Ted Cruz; 6.58%	Mike Huckabee 5.26%, Marco Rubio 5.26%, Scott Walker 4.61%, Chris Christie 2.63%, Bobby Jindal 2.63%, Paul Ryan 2.63%, Rick Perry 1.97%, Jon Huntsman Jr. 1.32%, Rick Santorum 1.32%, Rand Paul 1.32%, John Kasich 0%, Undecided 13.82%, Refused 1.32%
Magellan Strategies Margin of error: ± 6% Sample size: 270	April 14–15, 2014	Mike Huckabee; 24%	Jeb Bush; 16%	Rand Paul; 15%	Chris Christie 14%, Ted Cruz 7%, Marco Rubio 5%, Scott Walker 4%, John Kasich 3%, Undecided 12%
Public Policy Polling Margin of error: ± 5.4% Sample size: 334	April 3–6, 2014	Rand Paul; 16%	Chris Christie; 15%	Mike Huckabee; 15%	Ted Cruz 11%, Jeb Bush 9%, Paul Ryan 5%, Scott Walker 5%, Marco Rubio 4%, Bobby Jindal 3%, Someone Else/Undecided 17%
Public Policy Polling Margin of error: ± 4.6% Sample size: 450	December 5–8, 2013	Rand Paul; 18%	Chris Christie; 16%	Ted Cruz; 15%	Jeb Bush 10%, Marco Rubio 8%, Paul Ryan 7%, Scott Walker 5%, Bobby Jindal 4%, Rick Santorum 2%, Someone Else/Undecided 14%
Public Policy Polling Margin of error: ± 5.4% Sample size: 334	May 30 – June 2, 2013	Rand Paul; 18%	Jeb Bush; 16%	Chris Christie; 15%	Paul Ryan 12%, Marco Rubio 11%, Ted Cruz 7%, Rick Santorum 6%, Bobby Jindal 4%, Susana Martinez 0%, Someone Else/Undecided 10%

== Minnesota ==
Winner: Marco Rubio
Primary date: March 1, 2016

Poll source	Date	1st	2nd	3rd	Other
Primary results	March 1, 2016	Marco Rubio; 36.24%	Ted Cruz; 29.04%	Donald Trump; 21.42%	Ben Carson 7.37%, John Kasich 5.75%
Star Tribune/Mason-Dixon Margin of error: ± 6.5% Sample size: ?	January 18–20, 2016	Marco Rubio; 23%	Ted Cruz; 21%	Donald Trump; 18%	Ben Carson 11%, Jeb Bush 7%, Chris Christie 5%, Other 6%, Undecided 9%
KSTP Margin of error: ± 4.4% Sample size: 516	October 29 – November 2, 2015	Donald Trump; 26%	Ben Carson 19%	Marco Rubio 16%	Jeb Bush 9%, Ted Cruz 4%, Carly Fiorina 4%, Rand Paul 3%, Mike Huckabee 2%, others 4%, undecided 13%
Public Policy Polling Margin of error: ± 5.2% Sample size: 353	July 30 – August 2, 2015	Scott Walker; 19%	Donald Trump; 18%	Jeb Bush; 15%	Ben Carson 11%, Ted Cruz 7%, Mike Huckabee 6%, Rand Paul 5%, Marco Rubio 5%, Chris Christie 4%, Carly Fiorina 3%, John Kasich 3%, Bobby Jindal 1%, Rick Perry 0%, Rick Santorum 0%, Lindsey Graham 0%, George Pataki 0%, Jim Gilmore 0%, Undecided 1%
Suffolk University Margin of error: ± 10% Sample size: 87	April 24–28, 2014	Jeb Bush; 14.94%	Rick Perry; 14.94%	Chris Christie; 9.20%	Ted Cruz 9.20%, Marco Rubio 8.05%, Rand Paul 5.75%, Ben Carson 4.60%, Rick Santorum 4.60%, Condoleezza Rice 3.45%, Scott Walker 3.45%, Bobby Jindal 2.30%, Sarah Palin 2.30%, Paul Ryan 2.30%, Mike Huckabee 1.15%, Undecided 13.79%

== Mississippi ==
Winner: Donald Trump
Primary date: March 8, 2016

Poll source	Date	1st	2nd	3rd	Other
Primary results	March 8, 2016	Donald Trump; 47.24%	Ted Cruz; 36.12%	John Kasich; 8.84%	Marco Rubio 5.26%, Ben Carson 1.35%, Jeb Bush 0.41%, Mike Huckabee 0.26%, Rand Paul 0.15%, Rick Santorum 0.12%, Chris Christie 0.12%, Carly Fiorina 0.05%, Lindsey Graham 0.04%, George Pataki 0.03%
Magellan Strategies Margin of error: ± 3.1% Sample size: 995	February 29, 2016	Donald Trump; 41%	Ted Cruz; 17%	Marco Rubio; 16%	John Kasich 8%, Ben Carson 5%, Undecided 13%
Opinion Savvy/Insider Advantage Margin of error: ± 4.6% Sample size: 444	August 2, 2015	Donald Trump; 26.9%	Jeb Bush; 20.4%	Ben Carson; 9.6%	Ted Cruz 8.7%, Mike Huckabee 8.7%, Scott Walker 7%, Bobby Jindal 3.5%, Marco Rubio 3%, Chris Christie 2.9%, Rand Paul 2%, Carly Fiorina 1.8%, Rick Perry 1.3%, John Kasich 1.3%, Rick Santorum 0.4%, George Pataki 0.3%, Lindsey Graham 0%, Someone else 1.1%, Undecided 1.1%
Public Policy Polling Margin of error: ± 4.7% Sample size: 434	July 10–13, 2014	Mike Huckabee; 25%	Jeb Bush; 16%	Ted Cruz; 11%	Chris Christie 8%, Rand Paul 6%, Paul Ryan 6%, Marco Rubio 5%, Rick Santorum 3%, Scott Walker 2%, Other/Undecided 16%
Harper Polling Margin of error: ± 4.1% Sample size: 570	April 3–5, 2014	Jeb Bush; 29%	Chris Christie; 12%	Ted Cruz; 12%	Rand Paul 11%, Bobby Jindal 8%, Marco Rubio 5%, Scott Walker 5%, Rick Santorum 2%, Undecided 17%
Harper Polling Margin of error: ± 3.68% Sample size: 710	December 17–18, 2013	Chris Christie; 15.72%	Ted Cruz; 15.58%	Rand Paul; 14.45%	Paul Ryan 11.61%, Marco Rubio 10.34%, Bobby Jindal 9.49%, Rick Santorum 3.97%, Scott Walker 1.7%, Not sure 17.14%
Public Policy Polling Margin of error: ±4.8% Sample size: 422	November 15–17, 2013	Ted Cruz; 19%	Chris Christie; 17%	Jeb Bush; 16%	Rand Paul 12%, Bobby Jindal 8%, Marco Rubio 8%, Rick Santorum 5%, Paul Ryan 4%, Scott Walker 1%, Someone Else/Undecided 10%

== Missouri ==
Winner: Donald Trump
Primary date: March 15, 2016

Poll source	Date	1st	2nd	3rd	Other
Primary results	March 15, 2016	Donald Trump; 40.84%	Ted Cruz; 40.63%	John Kasich; 10.10%	Marco Rubio 6.09%, Ben Carson 0.88%, Jeb Bush 0.36%, Mike Huckabee 0.23%, Rand Paul 0.19%, Chris Christie 0.18%, Rick Santorum 0.08%, Carly Fiorina 0.07%
Fort Hayes State University Margin of error: ± 7% Sample size: 208	March 3–10, 2016	Donald Trump; 36%	Ted Cruz; 29%	Marco Rubio; 9%	John Kasich 8%, Other 1%, Undecided 17%
Remington Research Group Margin of error: ± 2.6% Sample size: 1,528	December 18–19, 2015	Donald Trump; 33%	Ted Cruz; 23%	Marco Rubio; 12%	Ben Carson 8%, Jeb Bush 3%, Chris Christie 3%, Carly Fiorina 2%, Rand Paul 1%, John Kasich 1%, Undecided 14%
Public Policy Polling Margin of error: 4.7% Sample size: 440	August 7–8, 2015	Donald Trump; 23%	Ben Carson; 11%	Jeb Bush; 11%	Mike Huckabee 10%, Ted Cruz 9%, Scott Walker 8%, Carly Fiorina 7%, Marco Rubio 6%, John Kasich 4%, Rand Paul 4%, Chris Christie 1%, Bobby Jindal 1%, Rick Perry 1%, Rick Santorum 1%, George Pataki 0%, Lindsey Graham 0%, Jim Gilmore 0%, Someone else/Undecided 2%

== Montana ==
Poll source	Date	1st	2nd	3rd	Other
Primary results	June 7, 2016	Donald Trump; 73.72%	Ted Cruz; 9.36%	John Kasich; 6.85%	Marco Rubio 3.30%, Jeb Bush 2.08%
Gravis Marketing Margin of error: ± 3% Sample size: ?	February 24–25, 2015	Jeb Bush; 19.8%	Mike Huckabee; 18.8%	Scott Walker; 18.8%	Marco Rubio 8.9%, Chris Christie 5%, Ted Cruz 4%, Rand Paul 4%, Rick Perry 3%, Ben Carson 2%, Unsure 15.8%
Public Policy Polling Margin of error: ± 4.5% Sample size: 469	November 15–17, 2013	Ted Cruz; 20%	Chris Christie; 14%	Rand Paul; 14%	Jeb Bush 11%, Paul Ryan 10%, Marco Rubio 8%, Rick Santorum 4%, Bobby Jindal 3%, Scott Walker 2%, Someone Else/Undecided 14%
Public Policy Polling Margin of error: ± 5.3% Sample size: 340	June 21–23, 2013	Rand Paul; 21%	Jeb Bush; 13%	Chris Christie; 12%	Ted Cruz 12%, Marco Rubio 10%, Paul Ryan 9%, Bobby Jindal 6%, Susana Martinez 3%, Rick Santorum 1%, Someone Else/Undecided 13%

== Nebraska ==
Winner: Donald Trump
Primary date: May 10, 2016

Poll source	Date	1st	2nd	3rd	Other
Primary results	May 10, 2016	Donald Trump; 61.43%	Ted Cruz; 18.45%	John Kasich; 11.41%	Ben Carson 5.08%, Marco Rubio 3.63%
Harper Polling Margin of error: ± 4% Sample size: 565	February 3–4, 2014	Rand Paul; 13.41%	Paul Ryan; 12.85%	Chris Christie; 12.66%	Ted Cruz 12.66%, Marco Rubio 8.38%, Scott Walker 8.38%, Bobby Jindal 5.03%, Rick Santorum 4.66%, Undecided 21.97%

== Nevada ==
Winner: Donald Trump
Caucus date: February 23, 2016

Poll source	Date	1st	2nd	3rd	Other
Primary results	February 23, 2016	Donald Trump; 45.75%	Marco Rubio; 23.77%	Ted Cruz; 21.30%	Ben Carson 4.79%, John Kasich 3.59%
CNN/ORC Margin of error: ± 6.5% Sample size: 245	February 10–15, 2016	Donald Trump; 45%	Marco Rubio; 19%	Ted Cruz; 17%	Ben Carson 7%, John Kasich 5%, Jeb Bush 1%, Someone else 2%, No opinion 4%
Gravis Marketing Margin of error: ± 5% Sample size: 406	December 23–27, 2015	Donald Trump; 33%	Ted Cruz; 20%	Marco Rubio; 11%	Ben Carson 6%, Carly Fiorina 5%, Jeb Bush 5%, Chris Christie 5%, Rand Paul 1%, Rick Santorum 1%, John Kasich 0%, Mike Huckabee 0%, Unsure 12%
Morning Consult Margin of error: ± 4% Sample size: 249	November 10–16, 2015	Donald Trump; 38%	Ben Carson; 18%	Marco Rubio; 12%	Ted Cruz 7%, Jeb Bush 6%, Carly Fiorina 2%, Mike Huckabee 2%, Rand Paul 2%, Chris Christie 1%, John Kasich 1%, Lindsey Graham 1%, Rick Santorum 0%, Someone else 1%, Don't know/No opinion 8%
CNN/ORC Margin of error: ± 6% Sample size: 285	October 3–10, 2015	Donald Trump; 38%	Ben Carson; 22%	Carly Fiorina; 8%	Marco Rubio 7%, Jeb Bush 6%, Ted Cruz 4%, Mike Huckabee 4%, Rand Paul 2%, Jim Gilmore 1%, Chris Christie 1%, George Pataki 1%, John Kasich 1%, Lindsey Graham 0%, Bobby Jindal 0%, Rick Santorum 0%, None 3%, No opinion 3%
Gravis Marketing Margin of error: ± 4% Sample size: 623	July 12–13, 2015	Donald Trump; 28%	Scott Walker; 15%	Ben Carson; 8%	Jeb Bush 7%, Marco Rubio 5%, Rand Paul 4%, Ted Cruz 4%, Rick Perry 3%, Bobby Jindal 2%, Mike Huckabee 2%, Chris Christie 2%, George Pataki 1%, Carly Fiorina 0%, Lindsey Graham 0%, Rick Santorum 0%, Undecided 20%
Gravis Marketing Margin of error: ± 5% Sample size: 443	March 27, 2015	Ted Cruz; 18%	Scott Walker; 18%	Jeb Bush; 16%	Marco Rubio 7%, Ben Carson 6%, Rand Paul 5%, Chris Christie 4%, Mike Huckabee 4%, Rick Santorum 2%, Carly Fiorina 1%, Undecided 20%
Gravis Marketing Margin of error: ± 5% Sample size: 438	February 21–22, 2015	Scott Walker; 27%	Jeb Bush; 19%	Chris Christie; 8%	Ted Cruz 6%, Mike Huckabee 6%, Rick Perry 6%, Marco Rubio 4%, Rick Santorum 4%, Rand Paul 3%, Bobby Jindal 1%, Undecided 16%

== New Jersey ==
Poll source	Date	1st	2nd	3rd	Other
Primary results	June 7, 2016	Donald Trump; 80.39%	John Kasich; 13.40%	Ted Cruz; 6.21%	
Monmouth University Margin of error: ± 5.7% Sample size: 301	May 1–3, 2016	Donald Trump; 70%	John Kasich; 15%	Ted Cruz; 11%	Undecided 5%
Rutgers-Eagleton Margin of error: ± 6.9% Sample size: 244	April 1–8, 2016	Donald Trump; 52%	John Kasich; 24%	Ted Cruz; 18%	Someone Else 4%, Don't Know 2%
Rutgers-Eagleton Margin of error: ± 7.0% Sample size: 227	February 6–15, 2016	Donald Trump; 38%	Marco Rubio; 11%	Ted Cruz; 10%	John Kasich 8%, Jeb Bush 7%, Chris Christie 7%, Ben Carson 5%, Carly Fiorina 2%, Someone Else 2%, Don't Know 11%
Rutgers-Eagleton Margin of error: ± ? Sample size: 230	November 30 – December 6, 2015	Donald Trump; 30%	Chris Christie; 14%	Marco Rubio; 13%	Ted Cruz 10%, Ben Carson 4%, Jeb Bush 2%, Carly Fiorina 2%, John Kasich 2%, Rand Paul 1%, Mike Huckabee 1%, Rick Santorum 1%, Lindsey Graham 0%, George Pataki 0%, Jim Gilmore 0%, Other 1%, Don't know 19%
Fairleigh Dickinson University Margin of error: ± 5.6% Sample size: 307	November 9–15, 2015	Donald Trump; 31%	Marco Rubio; 18%	Ben Carson; 11%	Chris Christie 9%, Ted Cruz 6%, Jeb Bush 5%, Carly Fiorina 5%, John Kasich 2%, Rand Paul 2%, Mike Huckabee 2%, Rick Santorum 1%, Lindsey Graham 1%, George Pataki 0%, other 1%, Wouldn't vote 1%, Don't know/Refused 5%
Quinnipiac University Margin of error: ± 4.5% Sample size: 481	November 4–8, 2015	Donald Trump; 31%	Ben Carson; 16%	Marco Rubio; 15%	Chris Christie 8%, Ted Cruz 7%, Carly Fiorina 4%, Jeb Bush 4%, John Kasich 3%, Bobby Jindal 1%, Rand Paul 1%, Rick Santorum 1%, Mike Huckabee 0%, Lindsey Graham 0%, Other 1%, Someone else 1%, Would not vote 2%, DK 6%
Rutgers-Eagleton Margin of error: ± 6.8% Sample size: 266	October 3–10, 2015	Donald Trump; 32%	Ben Carson; 13%	Marco Rubio; 13%	Ted Cruz 6%, Chris Christie 5%, Carly Fiorina 5%, Jeb Bush 5%, John Kasich 2%, Mike Huckabee 1%, George Pataki 1%, Rick Santorum <1%, Bobby Jindal <1%, Rand Paul <1%, Other 1%, Don't know 16%
Rutgers-Eagleton Margin of error: ± 6.8% Sample size: 263	July 25 – August 1, 2015	Donald Trump; 21%	Chris Christie; 12%	Jeb Bush; 10%	Scott Walker 10%, Ben Carson 5%, Marco Rubio 5%, Ted Cruz 4%, Rand Paul 2%, John Kasich 2%, Mike Huckabee 1%, Newt Gingrich 1%, Paul Ryan 1%, Carly Fiorina <1%, Lindsey Graham <1%, No one 3%, Other 2%, Don't know 19%
Fairleigh Dickinson University Margin of error: ± 6.3% Sample size: 267	June 15–21, 2015	Jeb Bush; 18%	Chris Christie; 18%	Donald Trump; 11%	Scott Walker 9%, Ben Carson 6%, Marco Rubio 6%, Rand Paul 5%, Ted Cruz 3%, Carly Fiorina 3%, Mike Huckabee 3%, George Pataki 2%, Rick Perry 2%, Rick Santorum 2%, Lindsey Graham 1%, Bobby Jindal 0%, John Kasich 0%, other 2%, Wouldn't vote 2%, Don't know/Refused 10%
Fairleigh Dickinson University Margin of error: ± 6% Sample size: 268	April 13–19, 2015	Chris Christie; 20%	Scott Walker; 14%	Jeb Bush; 13%	Ted Cruz 8%, Rand Paul 8%, Other 15%, Don't know 22%
Quinnipiac University Margin of error: ± 4.7% Sample size: 444	April 9–14, 2015	Chris Christie; 22%	Scott Walker; 14%	Jeb Bush; 11%	Rand Paul 9%, Marco Rubio 7%, Ted Cruz 6%, Mike Huckabee 4%, Bobby Jindal 3%, Ben Carson 2%, Carly Fiorina 1% John Kasich 1%, Lindsey Graham 0%, Rick Perry 0%, Rick Santorum 0%, Other 3%, Wouldn't vote 4%, Don't know 13%
Quinnipiac University Margin of error: ± 4.7% Sample size: 444	April 9–14, 2015	Chris Christie; 23%	Scott Walker; 15%	Rand Paul; 11%	Marco Rubio 9%, Ted Cruz 6%, Mike Huckabee 4%, Bobby Jindal 3%, Ben Carson 2%, Carly Fiorina 1% John Kasich 1%, Rick Santorum 1%, Lindsey Graham 0%, Rick Perry 0%, Other 3%, Wouldn't vote 4%, Don't know 16%
Quinnipiac University Margin of error: ± 4.7% Sample size: 444	April 9–14, 2015	Chris Christie; 23%	Jeb Bush; 12%	Marco Rubio; 11%	Rand Paul 10%, Ted Cruz 8%, Mike Huckabee 4%, Bobby Jindal 3%, Ben Carson 3%, John Kasich 2%, Carly Fiorina 1% Rick Perry 1%, Lindsey Graham 0%, Rick Santorum 0%, Other 3%, Wouldn't vote 4%, Don't know 14%
Quinnipiac University Margin of error: ± ? Sample size: ?	January 15–19, 2015	Chris Christie; 24%	Mitt Romney; 18%	Jeb Bush; 13%	Ben Carson 6%, Ted Cruz 6%, Rand Paul 5%, Mike Huckabee 4%, Scott Walker 4%, Marco Rubio 3%, Bobby Jindal 2%, Rick Perry 1%, John Kasich 0%, Rick Santorum 0%, Other 1%, Wouldn't vote 1%, Don't know 14%
Rutgers-Eagleton Margin of error: ± ? Sample size: 224	December 3–10, 2014	Chris Christie; 32%	Mitt Romney; 10%	Jeb Bush; 6%	Rand Paul 4%, Marco Rubio 4%, Ted Cruz 3%, Ben Carson 2%, Bobby Jindal 2%, Rudy Giuliani 1%, Ron Paul 1%, Rick Perry 1%, Scott Walker 1%, Other 3%, Don't know 31%
Rutgers-Eagleton Margin of error: ± ? Sample size: 255	July 28 – August 5, 2014	Chris Christie; 41%	Mitt Romney; 6%	Jeb Bush; 5%	Ted Cruz 3%, Rand Paul 2%, Scott Walker 2%, Mike Huckabee 1%, Ron Paul 1%, Rick Perry 1%, Marco Rubio 1%, Paul Ryan 1%, Newt Gingrich <1%, Rudy Giuliani <1%, Bobby Jindal <1%, Sarah Palin <1%, Other 3%, Don't know 30%
Fairleigh Dickinson University Margin of error: ± 6.5% Sample size: 228	August 21–27, 2013	Chris Christie; 51%	Rand Paul; 10%	Marco Rubio; 9%	Jeb Bush 6%, Other 10%, Undecided 13%
Kean University Margin of error: ± ?% Sample size: 309	April 25–29, 2013	Chris Christie; 41%	Marco Rubio; 18%	Rand Paul; 13%	Paul Ryan 12%, Other 5%, Undecided 11%

== New Mexico ==
Poll source	Date	1st	2nd	3rd	Other
Primary results	June 7, 2016	Donald Trump; 70.69%	Ted Cruz; 13.29%	John Kasich; 7.57%	Ben Carson 3.65%, Jeb Bush 3.36%, Carly Fiorina 1.44%
Albuquerque Journal Margin of error: ± 4.9% Sample size: 403	February 16–18, 2016	Ted Cruz; 25%	Donald Trump; 24%	Marco Rubio; 19%	Ben Carson 6%, Jeb Bush 5%, John Kasich 4%, Undecided 17%

== New York ==
Winner: Donald Trump
Primary date: April 19, 2016

Poll source	Date	1st	2nd	3rd	Other
Primary results	April 19, 2016	Donald Trump; 59.21%	John Kasich; 24.68%	Ted Cruz; 14.53%	
Emerson College Margin of error: ± 5.11% Sample size: 361	April 15 – 17, 2016	Donald Trump; 55%	John Kasich; 21%	Ted Cruz; 18%	Undecided 5%
CBS News/YouGov Margin of error: ± 5.9% Sample size: 705	April 13 – 15, 2016	Donald Trump; 54%	Ted Cruz; 21%	John Kasich; 19%	Undecided 6%
Optimus Margin of error: ± 0.822% Sample size: 14201	April 11 – 14, 2016	Donald Trump; 49%	John Kasich; 23%	Ted Cruz; 14%	Undecided 14%
NBC News/WSJ/Marist Margin of error: ± 5.5% Sample size: 313	April 10 – 13, 2016	Donald Trump; 54%	John Kasich; 25%	Ted Cruz; 16%	Undecided 5%
Siena College Margin of error: ± 5% Sample size: 469	April 6 – 11, 2016	Donald Trump; 50%	John Kasich; 27%	Ted Cruz; 17%	Other 6%
Quinnipiac University Margin of error: ± 4.2% Sample size: 550	April 6 – 11, 2016	Donald Trump; 55%	John Kasich; 20%	Ted Cruz; 19%	Undecided 6%
Public Policy Polling Margin of error: ± 4.5% Sample size: 483	April 7 – 10, 2016	Donald Trump; 51%	John Kasich; 25%	Ted Cruz; 20%	Undecided 4%
NBC News/WSJ/Marist Margin of error: ± 6.1% Sample size: 259	April 6 – 10, 2016	Donald Trump; 54%	John Kasich; 21%	Ted Cruz; 18%	Undecided 5%, Other 1%
Baruch College/New York 1 Margin of error: ± 5.8% Sample size: 324	April 5 – 10, 2016	Donald Trump; 60%	John Kasich; 17%	Ted Cruz; 14%	Undecided 7%, Refused 2%
Liberty Research Margin of error: ± 3.0% Sample size: 6041	April 6 – 7, 2016	Donald Trump; 52%	John Kasich; 23%	Ted Cruz; 19%	Undecided 6%
Emerson College Margin of error: ± 5.4% Sample size: 321	April 6 – 7, 2016	Donald Trump; 56%	Ted Cruz; 22%	John Kasich; 17%	Undecided 4%, Other 1%
Fox News Margin of error: ± 4% Sample size: 602	April 4 – 7, 2016	Donald Trump; 54%	John Kasich; 22%	Ted Cruz; 15%	Undecided 6%, Other 1%
Monmouth University Margin of error: ± 5.6% Sample size: 302	April 3 – 5, 2016	Donald Trump; 52%	John Kasich; 25%	Ted Cruz; 17%	Undecided 6%
CBS News/YouGov Margin of error: ± 5.6% Sample size: 657	March 29-April 1, 2016	Donald Trump; 52%	Ted Cruz; 21%	John Kasich; 20%	Other/Undecided 7%
Quinnipiac University Margin of error: ± 4.6% Sample size: 457	March 22 – 29, 2016	Donald Trump; 56%	Ted Cruz; 20%	John Kasich; 19%	Undecided 4%
Liberty Research Margin of error: ± 3% Sample size: 1795	March 24 – 26, 2016	Donald Trump; 55%	John Kasich; 22%	Ted Cruz; 19%	Undecided 4%
Optimus Margin of error: ± 0.8% Sample size: 14232	March 22 – 24, 2016	Donald Trump; 47%	John Kasich; 22%	Ted Cruz; 15%	Undecided 16%
Emerson College Margin of error: ± 5.6% Sample size: 298	March 14 – 16, 2016	Donald Trump; 64%	Ted Cruz; 12%	John Kasich; 1%	Other 19%, Undecided 1%
Siena College Margin of error: ± 6.7% Sample size: 229	February 28 – March 3, 2016	Donald Trump; 45%	Marco Rubio; 18%	John Kasich; 18%	Ted Cruz 11%, Other 1%, Undecided 7%
Siena College Margin of error: ± 7.0% Sample size: 235	January 31 – February 3, 2016	Donald Trump; 34%	Ted Cruz; 16%	Marco Rubio; 16%	Chris Christie 11%, Jeb Bush 7%, John Kasich 4%, Someone else 2%, Don't know/No opinion 10%
Siena College Margin of error: ± 6.7% Sample size: 214	September 14–17, 2015	Donald Trump; 34%	Ben Carson; 14%	Jeb Bush; 11%	Chris Christie 9%, Carly Fiorina 8%, Marco Rubio 5%, John Kasich 4%, Ted Cruz 3%, George Pataki 3%, Scott Walker 0%, Other 1%, None of them 5%, Undecided 5%
Quinnipiac University Margin of error: ± 5.2% Sample size: 356	May 28 – June 1, 2015	George Pataki; 11%	Marco Rubio; 11%	Jeb Bush; 10%	Scott Walker 7%, Ben Carson 6%, Chris Christie 6%, Rand Paul 6%, Donald Trump 6%, Mike Huckabee 5%, Ted Cruz 3%, Carly Fiorina 3%, Rick Santorum 2%, Bobby Jindal 1%, John Kasich 1%, Rick Perry 1%, Lindsey Graham 0%, DK/NA 14%, Wouldn't vote 3%, Someone else 1%
Siena College Margin of error: ± 6.6% Sample size: 223	April 19–23, 2015	Chris Christie; 25%	Jeb Bush; 20%	Marco Rubio; 9%	Rand Paul 8%, Ted Cruz 6%, Other 8%, Undecided 24%
Quinnipiac University Margin of error: ± 5.4% Sample size: 327	March 11–16, 2015	Jeb Bush; 13%	Scott Walker; 13%	Chris Christie; 12%	Marco Rubio 10%, Rand Paul 8%, Ben Carson 6%, George Pataki 6%, Ted Cruz 3%, Mike Huckabee 3%, Bobby Jindal 1%, John Kasich 1%, Rick Perry 1%, Rick Santorum 1%, Lindsey Graham 0%, Other 1%, Wouldn't vote 3%, Undecided 18%
Marist College Margin of error: ± 7.6% Sample size: 167	November 18–20, 2013	Chris Christie; 40%	Rand Paul; 10%	Marco Rubio; 10%	Jeb Bush 8%, Paul Ryan 5%, Ted Cruz 3%, Rick Perry 3%, Scott Walker 3%, Susana Martinez 2%, Rick Santorum 2%, Undecided 15%

== North Carolina ==
Winner: Donald Trump
Primary date: March 15, 2016

Poll source	Date	1st	2nd	3rd	Other
Primary results	March 15, 2016	Donald Trump; 40.23%	Ted Cruz; 36.76%	John Kasich; 12.67%	Marco Rubio 7.73%, Ben Carson 0.96%, Jeb Bush 0.34%, Mike Huckabee 0.27%, Rand Paul 0.24%, Chris Christie 0.11%, Carly Fiorina 0.08%, Rick Santorum 0.06%, Jim Gilmore 0.02%
Public Policy Polling Margin of error: ± 3.6% Sample size: 749	March 11–13, 2016	Donald Trump; 44%	Ted Cruz; 33%	John Kasich; 11%	Marco Rubio 7%, Undecided 5%
High Point University/SurveyUSA Margin of error: ± 3.3% Sample size: 734	March 9–10, 2016	Donald Trump; 48%	Ted Cruz; 28%	John Kasich; 12%	Marco Rubio 8%, Other 1%, No Preference 1%, Undecided 2%
Civitas Margin of error: ± 4.38% Sample size: 500	March 5–7, 2016	Donald Trump; 32%	Ted Cruz; 26%	Marco Rubio; 11%	John Kasich 11%, Ben Carson 3%, Mike Huckabee 2%, Jeb Bush 2%, Rand Paul 1%, Other 1%, No Preference 6%
WRAL-TV/SurveyUSA Margin of error: ± 3.8% Sample size: 688	March 4–7, 2016	Donald Trump; 41%	Ted Cruz; 27%	Marco Rubio; 14%	John Kasich 11%, Other 4%, Undecided 2%
Elon University Margin of error: ± 3.62% Sample size: 733	February 15–19, 2016	Donald Trump; 27.8%	Ted Cruz; 19.1%	Marco Rubio; 15.9%	Ben Carson 10%, John Kasich 6.8%, Jeb Bush 4%, Other 1.1%, Undecided 14.6%
SurveyUSA/ Time Warner Cable News Margin of error: ± 4.8% Sample size: 437	February 14–16, 2016	Donald Trump; 36%	Ted Cruz; 18%	Marco Rubio; 18%	Ben Carson 10%, John Kasich 7%, Jeb Bush 5%, Other 1%, No Preference 1%, Undecided 4%
Public Policy Polling Margin of error: ± 4% Sample size: 597	February 14–16, 2016	Donald Trump; 29%	Ted Cruz; 19%	Marco Rubio; 16%	John Kasich 11%, Ben Carson 9%, Jeb Bush 7%, Undecided 9%
High Point University Margin of error: ± 4.5% Sample size: 477	January 30– February 4, 2016	Donald Trump; 26%	Ted Cruz; 22%	Marco Rubio; 20%	Ben Carson 9%, Jeb Bush 3%, Chris Christie 2%, John Kasich 2%, Rand Paul 2%, Mike Huckabee 2%, Carly Fiorina 1%, Rick Santorum <1%, Jim Gilmore 0%, Other 4%, Don't Know 15%
Civitas Institute Margin of error: ± 4.38% Sample size: 500	January 18–19, 2016	Donald Trump; 27%	Ted Cruz; 23%	Marco Rubio; 10%	Ben Carson 7%, Jeb Bush 4%, Chris Christie 4%, Mike Huckabee 2%, John Kasich 2%, Rand Paul 2%, Carly Fiorina 2%, Rick Santorum 1%, No Preference 11%, Other 2%, Refused 4%
Public Policy Polling Margin of error: ± 4.7% Sample size: 433	January 18–19, 2016	Donald Trump; 38%	Ted Cruz; 16%	Marco Rubio; 11%	Ben Carson 8%, Jeb Bush 6%, Mike Huckabee 6%, Chris Christie 4%, Carly Fiorina 3%, Rand Paul 3%, John Kasich 2%, Rick Santorum 1%, Jim Gilmore 0%, Undecided 4%
Public Policy Polling Margin of error: ± 4.2% Sample size: 537	December 5–7, 2015	Donald Trump; 33%	Ted Cruz; 16%	Marco Rubio/Ben Carson 14%	Jeb Bush 5%, Chris Christie 4%, John Kasich 3%, Carly Fiorina 2%, Mike Huckabee 2%, Rand Paul 2%, Lindsey Graham 1%
Elon University Margin of error: ± 3.0% Sample size: 466	October 29 – November 2, 2015	Ben Carson; 31%	Donald Trump; 19%	Marco Rubio/Ted Cruz 9.7%	Jeb Bush 4.65%, Carly Fiorina 3.4%, Mike Huckabee 2.7%, Rand Paul 1.9%, Chris Christie 1.8%, John Kasich 1.3%, Lindsey Graham 1.1%, Bobby Jindal 0%, George Pataki 0%, Rick Santorum 0%, Undecided 12.2%, Refused 0.9%, Don't Know 0.7%
Public Policy Polling Margin of error ± 4.8% Sample size: 425	October 23–25, 2015	Donald Trump; 31%	Ben Carson; 23%	Marco Rubio; 11%	Jeb Bush 6%, Ted Cruz 6%, Carly Fiorina 6%, Mike Huckabee 5%, John Kasich 5%, Chris Christie 3%, Rand Paul 2%, Rick Santorum 2%, Jim Gilmore 0%, Lindsey Graham 0%, Bobby Jindal 0%, George Pataki 0%, Undecided 1%
Public Policy Polling Margin of error: ± 4.1% Sample size: 576	September 24–27, 2015	Donald Trump; 26%	Ben Carson; 21%	Carly Fiorina; 12%	Marco Rubio 10%, Ted Cruz 9%, Mike Huckabee 6%, Jeb Bush 5%, John Kasich 4%, Chris Christie 2%, Rick Santorum 1%, Bobby Jindal 1%, George Pataki 0%, Jim Gilmore 0%, Lindsey Graham 0%, Rand Paul 0%, Undecided 2%
Elon University Margin of error: ± 4.31% Sample size: 516	September 17–21, 2015	Donald Trump; 21.5%	Ben Carson; 20.9%	Carly Fiorina; 9.9%	Marco Rubio 7.4%, Jeb Bush 7%, Ted Cruz 6.2%, Mike Huckabee 4.1%, Rand Paul 2.3%, John Kasich 2.1%, Scott Walker 1.6%, Chris Christie 1.6%, Rick Santorum 1%, Lindsey Graham, 0.2%, Bobby Jindal 0%, George Pataki 0%, Jim Gilmore 0%, Other 0.6%, Undecided 13.2%, Refused 0.6%
Public Policy Polling Margin of error: ± 4.5% Sample size: 406	August 12–16, 2015	Donald Trump; 24%	Ben Carson; 14%	Jeb Bush; 13%	Ted Cruz 10%, Marco Rubio 9%, Carly Fiorina 6%, Mike Huckabee 6%, Scott Walker 6%, Rand Paul 3%, Chris Christie 2%, Rick Santorum 2%, Rick Perry 1%, John Kasich 1%, Bobby Jindal 0%, Lindsey Graham 0%, George Pataki 0%, Jim Gilmore 0%, Undecided 3%
Opinion Savvy/Insider Advantage Margin of error: ± 4.4% Sample size: 486	August 2–3, 2015	Donald Trump; 30.4%	Jeb Bush; 18.8%	Ben Carson; 11.9%	Ted Cruz 6.1%, Marco Rubio 5.3%, Scott Walker 5.3%, Mike Huckabee 5.1%, Carly Fiorina 2.6%, John Kasich 2.2%, Rand Paul 2%, Chris Christie 1.8%, Bobby Jindal 1.4%, Rick Santorum 1%, Lindsey Graham 0.7%, Rick Perry 0.4%, George Pataki 0%, Someone else 1.1%, Undecided 3.9%
Public Policy Polling Margin of error: ± 5.8% Sample size: 288	July 2–6, 2015	Donald Trump; 16%	Jeb Bush; 12%	Scott Walker; 12%	Mike Huckabee 11%, Ben Carson 9%, Marco Rubio 9%, Rand Paul 7%, Ted Cruz 6%, Chris Christie 5%, Carly Florina 4%, Rick Perry 2%, Lindsey Graham 1%, Bobby Jindal 1%, Rick Santorum 1%, John Kasich 0%, George Pataki 0%, Undecided 4%
Public Policy Polling Margin of error: ± 5.9% Sample size: 277	May 28–31, 2015	Jeb Bush; 19%	Rand Paul; 12%	Marco Rubio; 12%	Scott Walker 12%, Ted Cruz 11%, Mike Huckabee 10%, Ben Carson 9%, Chris Christie 8%, Carly Fiorina 2%, Not Sure 5%
SurveyUSA Margin of error: ± 5.5% Sample size: 333	April 22–27, 2015	Marco Rubio; 16%	Jeb Bush; 15%	Rand Paul; 14%	Scott Walker 12%, Mike Huckabee 11%, Ted Cruz 10%, Chris Christie 8%, Rick Perry 3%, Rick Santorum 2%, Other/Undecided 10%
Public Policy Polling Margin of error: ± 5.2% Sample size: 351	April 2–5, 2015	Jeb Bush; 19%	Scott Walker; 16%	Ted Cruz; 11%	Mike Huckabee 11%, Marco Rubio 11%, Ben Carson 9%, Chris Christie 7%, Rand Paul 6%, Rick Perry 2%, Undecided 7%
Civitas Institute Margin of error: ± 5% Sample size: 400	March 20–23, 2015	Scott Walker; 29%	Jeb Bush; 16%	Mike Huckabee; 14%	Ben Carson 13%, Rand Paul 8%, Chris Christie 7%, Rick Santorum 3%, Other/Undecided 10%
Public Policy Polling Margin of error: ± 5% Sample size: 389	February 24–26, 2015	Scott Walker; 24%	Jeb Bush; 17%	Mike Huckabee; 15%	Ben Carson 12%, Marco Rubio 7%, Chris Christie 5%, Rand Paul 5%, Ted Cruz 3%, Rick Perry 3%, Undecided 8%
Public Policy Polling Margin of error: ± 4.9% Sample size: 400	January 29–31, 2015	Mitt Romney; 16%	Jeb Bush; 14%	Ben Carson; 14%	Scott Walker 14%, Mike Huckabee 13%, Ted Cruz 6%, Rand Paul 6%, Chris Christie 5%, Rick Perry 3%, Undecided 9%
Meeting Street Research Margin of error: ± ? Sample size: 262	January 21–22, 2015	Mitt Romney; 18%	Jeb Bush; 17%	Chris Christie; 11%	Ben Carson 10%, Mike Huckabee 10%, Rand Paul 6%, Ted Cruz 5%, Scott Walker 4%, Rick Perry 3%, Mike Pence 0%, Undecided 15%, Refused 1%
Public Policy Polling Margin of error: ± 5% Sample size: 390	December 4–7, 2014	Ben Carson; 19%	Jeb Bush; 15%	Chris Christie; 14%	Mike Huckabee 14%, Paul Ryan 11%, Rick Perry 7%, Ted Cruz 5%, Rand Paul 5%, Marco Rubio 4%, Someone else/Not sure 7%
Suffolk University Margin of error: ± 8% Sample size: 129	August 16–19, 2014	Mike Huckabee; 17.5%	Jeb Bush; 11%	Chris Christie; 7%	Rick Perry 5.5%, Paul Ryan 5.5%, Marco Rubio 4%, Rand Paul 3.5%, Scott Walker 3.5%, Ted Cruz 3%, Bobby Jindal 1.5%, John Kasich 0.5%, Jon Huntsman Jr. 0%, Rick Santorum 0%, Undecided 32%, Refused 3.5%, Other 2%
Suffolk University Margin of error: ± 8% Sample size: 129	August 16–19, 2014	Mitt Romney; 38.76%	Mike Huckabee; 13.95%	Jeb Bush; 10.08%	Chris Christie 6.2%, Scott Walker 3.88%, Rand Paul 3.1%, Rick Perry 2.33%, Marco Rubio 2.33%, Paul Ryan 2.33%, Ted Cruz 1.55%, Jon Huntsman Jr. 0.78%, Bobby Jindal 0%, John Kasich 0%, Rick Santorum 0%, Undecided 11.63%, Refused 3.1%
Civitas Institute Margin of error: ± 5.3% Sample size: 336	July 28–29, 2014	Jeb Bush; 16%	Chris Christie; 9%	Rand Paul; 9%	Marco Rubio 8%, Ted Cruz 7%, Rick Perry 7%, Bobby Jindal 3%, Rick Santorum 3%, Scott Walker 3%, Undecided 22%, Won't vote in Republican primary 11%, Other 1%, Refused 1%
Public Policy Polling Margin of error: ± 4.9% Sample size: 394	May 9–11, 2014	Jeb Bush; 17%	Mike Huckabee; 17%	Chris Christie; 12%	Ted Cruz 12%, Rand Paul 12%, Paul Ryan 8%, Marco Rubio 5%, Scott Walker 5%, Bobby Jindal 2%, Someone else/Not sure 11%
Public Policy Polling Margin of error: ± 3.7% Sample size: 694	April 26–28, 2014	Mike Huckabee; 19%	Ted Cruz; 17%	Jeb Bush; 15%	Rand Paul 15%, Chris Christie 9%, Paul Ryan 6%, Marco Rubio 5%, Bobby Jindal 4%, Cliven Bundy 3%, Someone Else/Undecided 6%
Magellan Strategies Margin of error: ± 6% Sample size: 300	April 14–15, 2014	Mike Huckabee; 21%	Jeb Bush; 19%	Rand Paul; 15%	Chris Christie 12%, Ted Cruz 11%, Marco Rubio 6%, John Kasich 3%, Scott Walker 2%, Undecided 11%
Public Policy Polling Margin of error: ± 5.5% Sample size: 314	April 3–6, 2014	Mike Huckabee; 22%	Jeb Bush; 18%	Chris Christie; 12%	Ted Cruz 12%, Rand Paul 9%, Paul Ryan 9%, Scott Walker 7%, Marco Rubio 5%, Bobby Jindal 2% Someone Else/Undecided 6%
Public Policy Polling Margin of error: ± 5% Sample size: 392	March 6–9, 2014	Mike Huckabee; 19%	Chris Christie; 15%	Ted Cruz; 14%	Jeb Bush 12%, Rand Paul 12%, Scott Walker 6%, Marco Rubio 5%, Paul Ryan 4%, Bobby Jindal 1%, Someone Else/Undecided 12%
Public Policy Polling Margin of error: ± 5.6% Sample size: 305	February 6–9, 2014	Mike Huckabee; 20%	Jeb Bush; 15%	Rand Paul; 14%	Chris Christie 11%, Ted Cruz 8%, Paul Ryan 8%, Marco Rubio 7%, Scott Walker 4%, Bobby Jindal 3%, Someone Else/Undecided 9%
Public Policy Polling Margin of error: ± 4.1% Sample size: 575	January 9–12, 2014	Chris Christie; 17%	Jeb Bush; 14%	Rand Paul; 14%	Ted Cruz 11%, Paul Ryan 11%, Marco Rubio 9%, Bobby Jindal 5%, Rick Santorum 4%, Scott Walker 3%, Someone Else/Undecided 13%
Public Policy Polling Margin of error: ± 4.3% Sample size: 529	December 5–8, 2013	Chris Christie; 19%	Jeb Bush; 15%	Rand Paul; 13%	Ted Cruz 12%, Marco Rubio 10%, Paul Ryan 7%, Rick Santorum 5%, Scott Walker 5%, Bobby Jindal 3%, Someone Else/Undecided 11%
Public Policy Polling Margin of error: ± 4.4% Sample size: 498	November 8–11, 2013	Chris Christie; 20%	Jeb Bush; 16%	Ted Cruz; 12%	Rand Paul 12%, Marco Rubio 10%, Paul Ryan 7%, Bobby Jindal 6%, Rick Santorum 2%, Scott Walker 1%, Someone Else/Undecided 13%

== Ohio ==
Winner: John Kasich
Primary date: March 15, 2016

Poll source	Date	1st	2nd	3rd	Other
Primary results	March 15, 2016	John Kasich; 46.95%	Donald Trump; 35.87%	Ted Cruz; 13.31%	Marco Rubio 2.34%, Ben Carson 0.72%, Jeb Bush 0.27%, Mike Huckabee 0.25%, Chris Christie 0.12%, Carly Fiorina 0.11%, Rick Santorum 0.07%
ARG Margin of error: ± 5% Sample size: 400	March 12–13, 2016	John Kasich; 44%	Donald Trump; 38%	Ted Cruz; 12%	Marco Rubio 2%, Undecided 4%
Monmouth University Margin of error: ± 4.4% Sample size: 503	March 11–13, 2016	John Kasich; 40%	Donald Trump; 35%	Ted Cruz; 15%	Marco Rubio 5%, Other 1%, Undecided 4%
Quinnipiac University Margin of error: ± 3.7% Sample size: 721	March 8–13, 2016	Donald Trump; 38%	John Kasich; 38%	Ted Cruz; 16%	Marco Rubio 3%, Undecided 4%
CBS News/YouGov Margin of error: ± 4.4% Sample size: 798	March 9–11, 2016	John Kasich; 33%	Donald Trump; 33%	Ted Cruz; 27%	Marco Rubio 5%, No Preference 2%
NBC News/WSJ/Marist Margin of error: ± 4.1% Sample size: 564	March 4–10, 2016	John Kasich; 39%	Donald Trump; 33%	Ted Cruz; 19%	Marco Rubio 6%
Fox News Margin of error: ± 3.5% Sample size: 806	March 5–8, 2016	John Kasich; 34%	Donald Trump; 29%	Ted Cruz; 19%	Marco Rubio 7%, Undecided 5%, Other 3%, None of the above 2%
Quinnipiac University Margin of error: ± 3.7% Sample size: 685	March 2–7, 2016	Donald Trump; 38%	John Kasich; 32%	Ted Cruz; 16%	Marco Rubio 9%, Undecided 5%
Public Policy Polling Margin of error: ± 3.9% Sample size: 638	March 4–6, 2016	Donald Trump; 38%	John Kasich; 35%	Ted Cruz; 15%	Marco Rubio 5%, Undecided 5%
CNN/ORC Margin of error: ± 5% Sample size: 359	March 2–6, 2016	Donald Trump; 41%	John Kasich; 35%	Ted Cruz; 15%	Marco Rubio 7%
Quinnipiac University Margin of error: ± 3.6% Sample size: 759	February 16–20, 2016	Donald Trump; 31%	John Kasich; 26%	Ted Cruz; 21%	Marco Rubio 13%, Ben Carson 5%, Someone else 0%, DK/NA 5%
Baldwin Wallace University Margin of error: ± 5% Sample size: 440	February 11–20, 2016	Donald Trump; 31%	John Kasich; 29%	Ted Cruz; 11%	Marco Rubio 10%, Ben Carson 8%, Jeb Bush 3%, Don't Know 8%
Quinnipiac University Margin of error: ± 4.7% Sample size: 433	September 25 – October 5, 2015	Donald Trump; 23%	Ben Carson; 18%	John Kasich; 13%	Ted Cruz 11%, Carly Fiorina 10%, Marco Rubio 7%, Jeb Bush 4%, Rand Paul 3%, Mike Huckabee 2%, Chris Christie 1%, Jim Gilmore 0%, George Pataki 0%, Bobby Jindal 0%, Rick Santorum 0%, Lindsey Graham 0%, Someone else 0%, Would not vote 2%, DK/NA 6%
Quinnipiac University Margin of error: ± 5.1% Sample size: 371	August 7–18, 2015	John Kasich; 27%	Donald Trump; 21%	Ted Cruz; 7%	Marco Rubio 7%, Ben Carson 6%, Carly Fiorina 5%, Jeb Bush 5%, Mike Huckabee 3%, Scott Walker 2%, Rick Santorum 2%, Rand Paul 2%, Chris Christie 1%, Bobby Jindal 0%, Rick Perry 0%, Lindsey Graham 0%, Don't know 11%
Quinnipiac University Margin of error: ± 4.8% Sample size: 413	June 4–15, 2015	John Kasich; 19%	Jeb Bush; 9%	Scott Walker; 8%	Marco Rubio 7%, Rand Paul 7%, Mike Huckabee 7%, Ben Carson 6%, Ted Cruz 6%, Chris Christie 3%, Lindsey Graham 2%, Rick Perry 2%, Rick Santorum 2%, Carly Fiorina 1%, Donald Trump 1%, Bobby Jindal 0%, Someone else 1%, Wouldn't vote 1%, Don't know 17%
Public Policy Polling Margin of error: ± 4.8% Sample size: 411	June 4–7, 2015	John Kasich; 19%	Ben Carson; 13%	Scott Walker; 13%	Jeb Bush 12%, Marco Rubio 12%, Rand Paul 9%, Mike Huckabee 6%, Ted Cruz 5%, Chris Christie 4%, Someone Else/Not Sure 8%
Quinnipiac University Margin of error: ± 4.9% Sample size: 404	March 17–28, 2015	John Kasich; 20%	Ted Cruz; 9%	Mike Huckbee; 9%	Scott Walker 9%, Jeb Bush 8%, Ben Carson 8%, Rand Paul 7%, Chris Christie 5%, Marco Rubio 5%, Bobby Jindal 1%, Rick Perry 1%, Rick Santorum 1%, Lindsey Graham 0%, Someone else 1%, Wouldn't vote 1% Undecided 15%
Quinnipiac University Margin of error: ± 4.9% Sample size: 404	March 17–28, 2015	John Kasich; 22%	Scott Walker; 10%	Ted Cruz; 9%	Mike Huckabee 9%, Ben Carson 8%, Rand Paul 7%, Chris Christie 6%, Marco Rubio 6%, Rick Perry 2%, Bobby Jindal 1%, Rick Santorum 1%, Lindsey Graham 0%, Someone else 1%, Wouldn't vote 1% Undecided 17%
Quinnipiac University Margin of error: ± 4.9% Sample size: 404	March 17–28, 2015	John Kasich; 22%	Ted Cruz; 11%	Jeb Bush; 9%	Ben Carson 9%, Mike Huckabee 9%, Rand Paul 7%, Marco Rubio 6%, Chris Christie 5%, Bobby Jindal 2%, Rick Perry 1%, Rick Santorum 1%, Lindsey Graham 0%, Someone else 1%, Wouldn't vote 1% Undecided 15%
Quinnipiac University Margin of error: ± 5.3% Sample size: 337	January 22 – February 1, 2015	Mitt Romney; 15%	John Kasich; 11%	Scott Walker; 10%	Jeb Bush 9%, Rand Paul 8%, Ben Carson 7%, Ted Cruz 5%, Mike Huckabee 5%, Chris Christie 4%, Marco Rubio 3%, Bobby Jindal 1%, Rick Perry 0%, Rick Santorum 0%, Other 2%, Wouldn't vote 2%, Undecided 18%
Quinnipiac University Margin of error: ± 5.3% Sample size: 337	January 22 – February 1, 2015	John Kasich; 14%	Scott Walker; 11%	Jeb Bush; 10%	Rand Paul 10%, Ben Carson 8%, Mike Huckabee 7%, Ted Cruz 6%, Chris Christie 6%, Marco Rubio 4%, Bobby Jindal 1%, Rick Perry 1%, Rick Santorum 1%, Other 2%, Wouldn't vote 2%, Undecided 20%
Magellan Strategies Margin of error: ± 6% Sample size: 300	April 14–15, 2014	Mike Huckabee; 17%	Rand Paul; 15%	Jeb Bush; 13%	Chris Christie 13%, Ted Cruz 12%, John Kasich 10%, Marco Rubio 5%, Scott Walker 4%, Undecided 11%
Public Policy Polling Margin of error: ± 5.2% Sample size: 357	Aug. 16–19, 2013	Chris Christie; 17%	Rand Paul; 17%	Jeb Bush; 10%	Marco Rubio 9%, John Kasich 8%, Paul Ryan 8%, Ted Cruz 6%, Bobby Jindal 4%, Rick Santorum 4%, Someone Else/Undecided 17%

== Oklahoma ==
Winner: Ted Cruz
Primary date: March 1, 2016

Poll source	Date	1st	2nd	3rd	Other
Primary results	March 1, 2016	Ted Cruz; 34.37%	Donald Trump; 28.32%	Marco Rubio; 26.01%	Ben Carson 6.22%, John Kasich 3.59%, Jeb Bush 0.45%, Rand Paul 0.36%, Mike Huckabee 0.28%, Carly Fiorina 0.13%, Chris Christie 0.12%, Rick Santorum 0.08%, Lindsey Graham 0.05%
SurveyMonkey Margin of error: ± ?% Sample size: 636	February 22–29, 2016	Donald Trump; 34%	Ted Cruz; 19%	Marco Rubio; 19%	Ben Carson 14%, John Kasich 7%, Undecided 8%
Monmouth University Margin of error: ± 4.9% Sample size: 403	February 25–28, 2016	Donald Trump; 35%	Ted Cruz; 23%	Marco Rubio; 22%	John Kasich 8%, Ben Carson 7%, Other 1%, Undecided 4%
SoonerPoll Margin of error: ± 4.21% Sample size: 540	February 23–25, 2016	Donald Trump; 34%	Marco Rubio; 21%	Ted Cruz; 18%	Ben Carson 9%, John Kasich 6%, Undecided 13%
The Oklahoman Margin of error: ± 4.9% Sample size: 400	February 22–23, 2016	Donald Trump; 29%	Marco Rubio; 21%	Ted Cruz; 20%	Ben Carson 6%, John Kasich 5%, Other 2%, Undecided 18%
SoonerPoll Margin of error: ± 4.81% Sample size: 414	February 6–9, 2016	Donald Trump; 30.4%	Ted Cruz; 25.4%	Marco Rubio; 21.0%	Ben Carson 5.6%, Jeb Bush 4.6%, John Kasich 2.9%, Carly Fiorina 1.5%, Chris Christie 1.4%, Jim Gilmore 0.0%, Undecided 7.7%
SoonerPoll Margin of error: ± 4.21% Sample size: 541	January 17–19, 2016	Donald Trump; 35.1%	Ted Cruz; 25%	Marco Rubio; 9.6%	Ben Carson 7.8%, Jeb Bush 4.4%, Mike Huckabee 4.4%, Chris Christie 3.1%, Rand Paul 2.2%, Carly Fiorina 1.3%, Other 2.2%, Undecided 4.8%
SoonerPoll Margin of error: ± 5.1% Sample size: 389	November 12–15, 2015	Donald Trump; 27.1%	Ted Cruz; 18.3%	Ben Carson; 17.5%	Marco Rubio 16.3%, Mike Huckabee 4.3%, Carly Fiorina 2.3%, Jeb Bush 2.2%, Rand Paul 2.2%, John Kasich 0.5%, Other 2.5%, Undecided 6.7%
The Oklahoman Margin of error: ± 4.3% Sample size: 500	October 19–22, 2015	Ben Carson; 25%	Donald Trump; 19%	Marco Rubio; 9%	Ted Cruz 7%, Mike Huckabee 4%, Jeb Bush 3%, Carly Fiorina 2%, John Kasich 2%, Chris Christie 1%, Rand Paul 1%, Bobby Jindal 0%, Rick Santorum 0%, Lindsey Graham 0%, George Pataki 0%, Undecided 27%
Opinion Savvy/Insider Advantage Margin of error: ± 4.8% Sample size: 402	August 2, 2015	Donald Trump; 35.8%	Jeb Bush; 13.6%	Ben Carson; 10.1%	Ted Cruz 7.3%, Mike Huckabee 6.8%, Scott Walker 5.8%, Rand Paul 3.4%, Chris Christie 3.3%, Carly Fiorina 3%, Marco Rubio 2.6%, John Kasich 2.3%, Rick Perry 1.6%, Bobby Jindal 1.2%, Rick Santorum 1.1%, Lindsey Graham 0.4%, George Pataki 0%, Someone else 0.7%, Undecided 1.1%
Harper Polling Margin of error: ± 3.91% Sample size: 627	Jan. 30 – Feb 1, 2014	Ted Cruz; 19%	Rand Paul; 15%	Chris Christie; 11%	Paul Ryan 11%, Marco Rubio 9%, Bobby Jindal 6%, Rick Santorum 5%, Scott Walker 4%, Undecided 19%

== Oregon ==
Winner: Donald Trump
Primary date: May 17, 2016

Poll source	Date	1st	2nd	3rd	Other
Primary results	May 17, 2016	Donald Trump; 64.51%	Ted Cruz; 16.50%	John Kasich; 15.83%	
DHM Research/Oregon Public Broadcasting/Fox 12 Margin of error: ± 5.7% Sample size: 324	May 6–9, 2016	Donald Trump 45%	Ted Cruz; 14%	John Kasich; 14%	Undecided 19%, Wouldn't Vote 7%
Hoffman Research Margin of error: ± 4.16% Sample size: 555	April 26–27, 2016	Donald Trump 43%	Ted Cruz; 26%	John Kasich; 17%	Undecided 13%
DHM Research Margin of error: ± 7.7% Sample size: 169	July 22–27, 2015	Donald Trump; 18%	Scott Walker 12%	Jeb Bush 11%	Ted Cruz 10%, Ben Carson 9%, Rand Paul 6%, Mike Huckabee 6%, John Kasich 4%, Marco Rubio 3%, Chris Christie 2%, Carly Fiorina 2%, Rick Santorum 2%, Bobby Jindal 1%, Rick Perry 1%, Lindsey Graham 0%, Jim Gilmore 0%, George Pataki 0%, Other 2%, DK 12%
Public Policy Polling Margin of error: ± 5.1% Sample size: 375	May 22–27, 2014	Mike Huckabee; 21%	Ted Cruz; 16%	Jeb Bush; 15%	Rand Paul 15%, Chris Christie 12%, Marco Rubio 4%, Paul Ryan 3%, Scott Walker 3%, Rick Santorum 2%, Someone else/Not sure 10%

== Pennsylvania ==
Winner: Donald Trump
Primary date: April 26, 2016

Poll source	Date	1st	2nd	3rd	Other
Primary results	April 26, 2016	Donald Trump; 56.71%	Ted Cruz; 21.66%	John Kasich; 19.36%	Ben Carson 0.93%, Marco Rubio 0.75%, Jeb Bush 0.60%
Fox 29/Opinion Savvy Margin of error: ± 3% Sample size: 1050	April 22–24, 2016	Donald Trump 48%	Ted Cruz; 28%	John Kasich; 19%	Undecided 5%
Public Policy Polling Margin of error: ± 3.4% Sample size: 826	April 22–24, 2016	Donald Trump 51%	Ted Cruz; 25%	John Kasich; 22%	Undecided 3%
ARG Margin of error: ± 5 Sample size: 400	April 21–24, 2016	Donald Trump 50%	Ted Cruz; 23%	John Kasich; 21%	Undecided 6%
CBS News/YouGov Margin of error: ± 4.6% Sample size: 934	April 20–22, 2016	Donald Trump 49%	Ted Cruz; 26%	John Kasich; 22%	Undecided 3%
NBC News/Wall Street Journal/Marist College Margin of error: ± 4.1% Sample size: 571	April 18–20, 2016	Donald Trump 45%	Ted Cruz; 27%	John Kasich; 24%	Other 3%, Undecided 3%
Franklin & Marshall College Margin of error: ± 4.0% Sample size: 549	April 11–18, 2016	Donald Trump 40%	Ted Cruz; 26%	John Kasich; 24%	Undecided 10%
CBS News/YouGov Margin of error: ± 4.8% Sample size: 837	April 13–15, 2016	Donald Trump 46%	Ted Cruz; 26%	John Kasich; 23%	Undecided 4%
Monmouth University Margin of error: ± 5.6% Sample size: 303	April 10–12, 2016	Donald Trump; 44%	Ted Cruz; 28%	John Kasich; 23%	Undecided 6%
Morning Call/Muhlenberg College Margin of error: ± 5.5% Sample size: 422	April 7–12, 2016	Donald Trump; 41%	John Kasich; 26%	Ted Cruz; 23%	Other 3%, Undecided 8%
Fox News Margin of error: ± 3.5% Sample size: 802	April 4–7, 2016	Donald Trump; 48%	John Kasich; 22%	Ted Cruz; 20%	Other 1%, Not Sure 8%
Muhlenberg College Margin of error: ± 6% Sample size: 360	April 1–6, 2016	Donald Trump; 35%	Ted Cruz; 28%	John Kasich; 27%	Other/Neither 5%, Not Sure 5%
Quinnipiac University Margin of error: ± 4.1% Sample size: 578	March 30-April 4, 2016	Donald Trump; 39%	Ted Cruz; 30%	John Kasich; 24%	Undecided 7%
CBS News/YouGov Margin of error: ± 5.0% Sample size: 729	March 29-April 1, 2016	Donald Trump; 47%	Ted Cruz; 29%	John Kasich; 22%	Other/Undecided 2%
Franklin & Marshall; College Margin of error: ± 5.4% Sample size: 312	March 14–20, 2016	Donald Trump; 33%	John Kasich; 30%	Ted Cruz; 20%	Undecided 17%
Harper Polling Margin of error: ± 5.22% Sample size: 353	March 1–2, 2016	Donald Trump; 36%	Marco Rubio; 19%	Ted Cruz; 17%	Ben Carson 11%, John Kasich 10%, Undecided 8%
Franklin & Marshall; College Margin of error: ± ?% Sample size: 371	February 13–21, 2016	Donald Trump; 22%	Marco Rubio; 16%	John Kasich; 15%	Ted Cruz 12%, Ben Carson 6%, Jeb Bush 4%, Don't know 25%
Robert Morris University Margin of error: ± ?% Sample size: 177	February 11–16, 2016	Donald Trump; 41%	Marco Rubio; 15%	Ted Cruz; 15%	John Kasich 9%, Ben Carson 8%, Jeb Bush 4%, Undecided 9%
Franklin & Marshall; College Margin of error: ± ?% Sample size: 276	January 18–23, 2016	Donald Trump; 24%	Ted Cruz; 14%	Marco Rubio; 11%	Ben Carson 5%, Jeb Bush 5%, Chris Christie 5%, John Kasich 3%, Carly Fiorina 2%, Mike Huckabee 2%, Rand Paul 2%, Rick Santorum 1%, Don't know 26%
Franklin & Marshall; College Margin of error: ± ?% Sample size: 231	October 19–25, 2015	Donald Trump; 23%	Ben Carson; 22%	Marco Rubio; 13%	John Kasich 6%, Ted Cruz 4%, Chris Christie 3%, Jeb Bush 3%, Carly Fiorina 3%, Mike Huckabee 1%, Bobby Jindal 1%, Rand Paul 1%, Rick Santorum 1%, Lindsey Graham <0%, George Pataki <0%, Don't know 20%
Public Policy Polling Margin of error: ± 4.5% Sample size: 479	October 8–11, 2015	Donald Trump; 24%	Ben Carson; 23%	Ted Cruz; 9%	Carly Fiorina 9%, Chris Christie 7%, Jeb Bush 7%, Marco Rubio 6%, Mike Huckabee 3%, John Kasich 3%, Rick Santorum 2%, Jim Gilmore 1%, Rand Paul 1%, George Pataki 1%, Bobby Jindal 0%, Lindsey Graham 0%, Undecided 4%
Quinnipiac University Margin of error: ± 4.7% Sample size: 427	September 25 – October 5, 2015	Donald Trump; 23%	Ben Carson; 17%	Marco Rubio; 12%	Carly Fiorina 8%, Ted Cruz 6%, Chris Christie 5%, Jeb Bush 4%, Mike Huckabee 4%, John Kasich 3%, Rick Santorum 2%, Rand Paul 1%, Bobby Jindal 1%, George Pataki 1%, Lindsey Graham 0%, Jim Gilmore 0%, Would not vote 1%, Someone else 0%, DK/NA 12%
Mercyhurst Margin of error: ± 4.5% Sample size: 483	September 21 – October 1, 2015	Donald Trump; 18%	Ben Carson; 18%	Jeb Bush; 9%	Carly Fiorina 8%, Ted Cruz 4%, Marco Rubio 4%, Chris Christie 4%, Rand Paul 3%, Rick Santorum 3%, John Kasich 3%, Mike Huckabee 3%, Others 2%, Undecided 17%, Refused 1%
Quinnipiac University Margin of error: ± 4.7% Sample size: 443	August 7–18, 2015	Donald Trump; 24%	Ben Carson; 13%	Marco Rubio; 10%	Carly Fiorina 7%, Jeb Bush 6%, Ted Cruz 5%, Scott Walker 5%, Rand Paul 5%, Rick Santorum 4%, John Kasich 3%, Mike Huckabee 2%, Chris Christie 2%, Bobby Jindal 1%, Rick Perry 0%, Lindsey Graham 0%, Someone else 1%, Wouldn't vote 2%, Don't know 9%
Quinnipiac University Margin of error: ± 4.8% Sample size: 413	June 4–15, 2015	Marco Rubio; 12%	Rand Paul; 11%	Jeb Bush; 10%	Ben Carson 10%, Scott Walker 9%, Rick Santorum 7%, Chris Christie 6%, Mike Huckabee 6%, Ted Cruz 5%, Donald Trump 4%, Carly Fiorina 1%, Lindsey Graham 1%, John Kasich 1%, Rick Perry 1%, Bobby Jindal 0%, Someone else 2%, Wouldn't vote 1%, Don't know 13%
Public Policy Polling Margin of error: ± 5.4% Sample size: 334	May 21–24, 2015	Scott Walker; 17%	Ben Carson; 12%	Chris Christie; 12%	Rick Santorum 12%, Mike Huckabee 11%, Jeb Bush 9%, Marco Rubio 9%, Ted Cruz 6%, Rand Paul 6%, Someone else/Not sure 6%
Quinnipiac University Margin of error: ± 4.7% Sample size: 442	March 17–28, 2015	Scott Walker; 14%	Jeb Bush; 9%	Ben Carson; 9%	Rick Santorum 9%, Ted Cruz 7%, Marco Rubio 7%, Mike Huckabee 6%, Rand Paul 6%, Chris Christie 5%, Rick Perry 3%, John Kasich 2%, Bobby Jindal 1%, Lindsey Graham 0% Someone else 0%, Wouldn't vote 4% Undecided 18%
Quinnipiac University Margin of error: ± 4.7% Sample size: 442	March 17–28, 2015	Scott Walker; 14%	Ben Carson; 9%	Rick Santorum 9%	Ted Cruz 8%, Rand Paul 8%, Marco Rubio 8%, Chris Christie 6%, Mike Huckabee 6%, Rick Perry 3%, Bobby Jindal 2%, John Kasich 2%, Lindsey Graham 1%, Someone else 0%, Wouldn't vote 4%, Undecided 20%
Quinnipiac University Margin of error: ± 4.7% Sample size: 442	March 17–28, 2015	Ben Carson; 11%	Jeb Bush; 10%	Ted Cruz; 10%	Marco Rubio 9%, Scott Walker 9%, Mike Huckabee 7%, Rand Paul 7%, Chris Christie 5%, Rick Perry 3%, Bobby Jindal 2%, John Kasich 2%, Lindsey Graham 1%, Someone else 2%, Wouldn't vote 4%, Undecided 19%
Quinnipiac University Margin of error: ± 5.3% Sample size: 342	January 22 – February 1, 2015	Mitt Romney; 12%	Jeb Bush; 10%	Chris Christie; 10%	Mike Huckabee 9%, Ben Carson 8%, Rick Santorum 6%, Scott Walker 5%, Ted Cruz 4%, Rand Paul 3%, Marco Rubio 3%, Bobby Jindal 2%, John Kasich 2%, Rick Perry 1%, Other 2%, Wouldn't vote 2%, Undecided 21%
Quinnipiac University Margin of error: ± 5.3% Sample size: 342	January 22 – February 1, 2015	Jeb Bush; 12%	Chris Christie; 11%	Mike Huckabee; 10%	Ben Carson 8%, Rick Santorum 8%, Ted Cruz 6%, Scott Walker 6%, Marco Rubio 4%, John Kasich 3%, Rand Paul 3%, Bobby Jindal 2%, Rick Perry 1%, Other 2%, Wouldn't vote 2%, Undecided 22%
Public Policy Polling Margin of error: ± 4% Sample size: 592	January 15–18, 2015	Ben Carson; 18%	Jeb Bush; 14%	Mitt Romney; 14%	Chris Christie 9%, Ted Cruz 9%, Mike Huckabee 9%, Scott Walker 8%, Rand Paul 7%, Rick Santorum 6%, Someone else/Not sure 6%
Public Policy Polling Margin of error: ± 4% Sample size: 592	January 15–18, 2015	Ben Carson; 19%	Jeb Bush; 18%	Chris Christie; 12%	Ted Cruz 10%, Mike Huckabee 10%, Scott Walker 9%, Rand Paul 8%, Rick Santorum 8%, Someone else/Not sure 7%
Public Policy Polling Margin of error: ± 5.4% Sample size: 333	May 30 – June 1, 2014	Chris Christie; 23%	Mike Huckabee; 14%	Rand Paul; 12%	Jeb Bush 10%, Ted Cruz 10%, Rick Santorum 8%, Marco Rubio 6%, Paul Ryan 4%, Scott Walker 3%, Someone else/Not sure 9%
Public Policy Polling Margin of error: ± 4.4% Sample size: 491	November 22–25, 2013	Chris Christie; 26%	Ted Cruz; 16%	Rand Paul; 14%	Jeb Bush 10%, Rick Santorum 8%, Marco Rubio 6%, Paul Ryan 5%, Bobby Jindal 3%, Scott Walker 3%, Someone Else/Undecided 9%
Public Policy Polling Margin of error: ± 5.1% Sample size: 373	March 8–10, 2013	Chris Christie; 20%	Rand Paul; 17%	Marco Rubio; 17%	Jeb Bush 10%, Rick Santorum 10%, Mike Huckabee 9%, Paul Ryan 6%, Bobby Jindal 4%, Rick Perry 1%, Someone Else/Undecided 6%

== Rhode Island ==
Winner: Donald Trump
Primary date: April 26, 2016

Poll source	Date	1st	2nd	3rd	Other
Primary results	April 26, 2016	Donald Trump; 62.92%	John Kasich; 24.01%	Ted Cruz; 10.29%	Marco Rubio 0.61%
Gravis Marketing Margin of error: ± 4.0% Sample size: 566	April 23–24, 2016	Donald Trump 58%	John Kasich; 21%	Ted Cruz; 10%	Undecided 11%
Public Policy Polling Margin of error: ± 4.3% Sample size: 511	April 22–24, 2016	Donald Trump 61%	John Kasich; 23%	Ted Cruz; 13%	Undecided 2%
Brown University Margin of error: ± 7.0% Sample size: 164	April 19–21, 2016	Donald Trump; 38%	John Kasich; 25%	Ted Cruz; 14%	Undecided 17%, Other 6%
Brown University Margin of error: ± ?% Sample size: 206	February 22–23, 2016	Donald Trump; 43%	Marco Rubio; 25%	John Kasich; 14%	Ted Cruz 10%, Ben Carson 3%, Undecided 5%
Brown University Margin of error: ± ?% Sample size: 204	February 17–20, 2016	Donald Trump; 41%	Marco Rubio; 14%	John Kasich; 12%	Ted Cruz 8%, Jeb Bush 7%, Ben Carson 4%, Other 1%, Undecided 13%

== South Carolina ==
Winner: Donald Trump
Primary date: February 20, 2016

Poll source	Date	1st	2nd	3rd	Other
Primary results	February 20, 2016	Donald Trump; 32.51%	Marco Rubio; 22.48%	Ted Cruz; 22.33%	Jeb Bush 7.84%, John Kasich 7.61%, Ben Carson 7.23%
Opinion Savvy/ Augusta Chronicle Margin of error: ± 3.5% Sample size: 780	February 18–19, 2016	Donald Trump; 26.9%	Marco Rubio; 24.1%	Ted Cruz; 18.8%	Jeb Bush 10.6%, Ben Carson 8.2%, John Kasich 7.5%, Undecided 3.9%
South Carolina; House GOP Margin of error: ± 2.0% Sample size: 3500	February 18, 2016	Donald Trump; 33.51%	Ted Cruz; 18.96%	Marco Rubio; 18.07%	Jeb Bush 11.56%, John Kasich 8.49%, Ben Carson 5.22%, Undecided 4.19%
National Research Margin of error: ± ?% Sample size: 500	February 17–18, 2016	Donald Trump; 32%	Ted Cruz; 19%	Marco Rubio; 18%	Jeb Bush 8%, John Kasich 7%, Ben Carson 6%, Refused 2%, Undecided 7%
ARG Margin of error: ± 5.0% Sample size: 401	February 17–18, 2016	Donald Trump; 34%	Marco Rubio; 22%	John Kasich; 14%	Ted Cruz 13%, Jeb Bush 9%, Ben Carson 4%, Other 1%, Undecided 3%
Emerson College Margin of error: ± 4.7% Sample size: 418	February 16–18, 2016	Donald Trump; 36%	Ted Cruz; 19%	Marco Rubio; 18%	John Kasich 10%, Jeb Bush 10%, Ben Carson 6%
Clemson University Margin of error: ± 3.0% Sample size: 650	February 14–18, 2016	Donald Trump; 28%	Ted Cruz; 19%	Marco Rubio; 15%	Jeb Bush 10%, John Kasich 9%, Ben Carson 6%, Undecided 13%
ARG Margin of error: ± 5.0% Sample size: 400	February 16–17, 2016	Donald Trump; 33%	Marco Rubio; 20%	John Kasich; 15%	Ted Cruz 13%, Jeb Bush 8%, Ben Carson 3%, Other 1%, Undecided 7%
Harper Polling Margin of error: ± 4% Sample size: 599	February 16–17, 2016	Donald Trump; 29%	Ted Cruz; 17%	Marco Rubio; 15%	Jeb Bush 14%, John Kasich 13%, Ben Carson 8%, Undecided 5%
NBC News/Wall Street; Journal/Marist College Margin of error: ± 3.6% Sample size: 722	February 15–17, 2016	Donald Trump; 28%	Ted Cruz; 23%	Marco Rubio; 15%	Jeb Bush 13%, Ben Carson 9%, John Kasich 9%, Undecided 5%
Fox News Margin of error: ± 3.5% Sample size: 759	February 15–17, 2016	Donald Trump; 32%	Ted Cruz; 19%	Marco Rubio; 15%	Jeb Bush 9%, Ben Carson 9%, John Kasich 6%, Other 1%, Undecided 8%
Emerson College Margin of error: ± 5.0% Sample size: 315	February 15–16, 2016	Donald Trump; 33%	Ted Cruz; 20%	Marco Rubio; 19%	John Kasich 9%, Jeb Bush 9%, Ben Carson 5%, Other 1%, Undecided 4%
ARG Margin of error: ± 5.0% Sample size: 400	February 14–16, 2016	Donald Trump; 33%	Marco Rubio; 16%	Ted Cruz; 14%	John Kasich 14%, Jeb Bush 9%, Ben Carson 3%, Other 2%, Undecided 8%
Monmouth University Margin of error: ± 4.9% Sample size: 400	February 14–16, 2016	Donald Trump; 35%	Ted Cruz; 19%	Marco Rubio; 17%	John Kasich 9%, Jeb Bush 8%, Ben Carson 7%, Undecided 5%
Bloomberg/Selzer Margin of error: ± 4.4% Sample size: 502	February 13–16, 2016	Donald Trump; 36%	Ted Cruz; 17%	Marco Rubio; 15%	Jeb Bush 13%, Ben Carson 9%, John Kasich 7%, Undecided 3%
Public Policy Polling Margin of error: ± 3.3% Sample size: 897	February 14–15, 2016	Donald Trump; 35%	Ted Cruz; 18%	Marco Rubio; 18%	John Kasich 10%, Jeb Bush 7%, Ben Carson 7%, Undecided 6%
South Carolina; House GOP Margin of error: ± 2.4% Sample size: 1700	February 15, 2016	Donald Trump; 33.57%	Ted Cruz; 15.54%	Marco Rubio; 14.83%	Jeb Bush 14.54%, John Kasich 7.98%, Ben Carson 6.55%, Undecided 7.03%
CNN/ORC Margin of error: ± 5% Sample size: 404	February 10–15, 2016	Donald Trump; 38%	Ted Cruz; 22%	Marco Rubio; 14%	Jeb Bush 10%, Ben Carson 6%, John Kasich 4%, Jim Gilmore 1%, Someone Else 1%, Undecided 1%, No Opinion 3%
ARG Margin of error: ± 5.0% Sample size: 400	February 12–13, 2016	Donald Trump; 35%	John Kasich; 15%	Marco Rubio; 14%	Ted Cruz 12%, Jeb Bush 10%, Ben Carson 2%, Other 2%, Undecided 10%
South Carolina; House GOP Margin of error: ± ?% Sample size: 1200	February 11–12, 2016	Donald Trump; 34.5%	Ted Cruz; 15.5%	Jeb Bush; 13%	Marco Rubio 12.5%, John Kasich 8.5%, Ben Carson 5%, Undecided 11%
CBS News/YouGov Margin of error: ± 5.2% Sample size: 744	February 10–12, 2016	Donald Trump; 42%	Ted Cruz; 20%	Marco Rubio; 15%	John Kasich 9%, Jeb Bush 6%, Ben Carson 6%, Chris Christie 1%, Carly Fiorina 0%, Jim Gilmore 0%, No preference 1%
Opinion Savvy/ Augusta Chronicle Margin of error: ± 3.5% Sample size: 779	February 10–11, 2016	Donald Trump; 36.3%	Ted Cruz; 19.6%	Marco Rubio; 14.6%	Jeb Bush 10.9%, John Kasich 8.7%, Ben Carson 4.7%, Undecided 5.2%
NBC/WSJ/Marist Margin of error: ± 3.7% Sample size: 718	January 17–23, 2016	Donald Trump; 36%	Ted Cruz; 20%	Marco Rubio; 14%	Jeb Bush 9%, Ben Carson 8%, Mike Huckabee 2%, Chris Christie 2%, Rand Paul 1%, John Kasich 1%, Carly Fiorina 1%, Other 0%, Undecided 6%
CBS/YouGov Margin of error: ± 5.3% Sample size: 804	January 18–21, 2016	Donald Trump; 40%	Ted Cruz; 21%	Marco Rubio; 13%	Ben Carson 9%, Jeb Bush 8%, Rand Paul 3%, Mike Huckabee 2%, John Kasich 2%, Chris Christie 1%, Carly Fiorina 1%, Rick Santorum 0%, Jim Gilmore 0%, No Preference 0%
Morris News/Opinion Savvy Margin of error: ± 3.7% Sample size: 683	January 15, 2016	Donald Trump; 32%	Ted Cruz; 18%	Jeb Bush; 13%	Marco Rubio 11%, Ben Carson 9%, Chris Christie 4%, Carly Fiorina 3%, Mike Huckabee 2%, John Kasich 2%, Rand Paul 2%, Rick Santorum 1%, Undecided 3%
Associated Industries of Florida Margin of error: ± 3.9% Sample size: 600	December 16–17, 2015	Donald Trump; 27%	Ted Cruz; 27%	Marco Rubio; 12%	Ben Carson 11%, Jeb Bush 7%, Others 5%, Undecided 11%
CBS News/YouGov Margin of error: ± 5% Sample size: 1469	December 14–17, 2015	Donald Trump; 38%	Ted Cruz; 23%	Marco Rubio; 12%	Ben Carson 9%, Jeb Bush 7%, Rand Paul 4%, John Kasich 2%, Chris Christie 1%, Carly Fiorina 1%, Mike Huckabee 1%, Lindsey Graham 1%, Rick Santorum 0%, George Pataki 0%, Jim Gilmore 0%, No preference 1%
Opinion Savvy/Augusta Chronicle Margin of error: ± 4.2% Sample size: 536	December 16, 2015	Donald Trump; 28.3%	Ted Cruz; 21.1%	Marco Rubio; 11.6%	Jeb Bush 9.6%, Ben Carson 9.5%, Chris Christie 5.5%, Carly Fiorina 4.6%, Rand Paul 2.6%, Mike Huckabee 2.1%, Lindsey Graham 1.9%, John Kasich 1.4%, Rick Santorum 0.5%, George Pataki 0.2%, Undecided 1.3%
Winthrop University Margin of error: ± 3.4% Sample size: 828	November 30 – December 7, 2015	Donald Trump; 24%	Ted Cruz; 16%	Ben Carson; 14%	Marco Rubio 11%, Jeb Bush 9%, Mike Huckabee 2%, Lindsey Graham 2%, Carly Fiorina 1%, Rand Paul 1%, Chris Christie 1%, John Kasich 1%, Rick Santorum 0%, George Pataki 0%
Fox News Margin of error: ± 4.5% Sample size: 437	December 5–8, 2015	Donald Trump; 35%	Ben Carson; 15%	Marco Rubio/Ted Cruz; 14%	Jeb Bush 5%, Rand Paul 2%, Lindsey Graham 2%, Chris Christie 2%, Carly Fiorina 1%, John Kasich 1%, Mike Huckabee 1%, Rick Santorum 1%, George Pataki 0%, None of the Above 1%, Don't Know 5%
CBS News/YouGov Margin of error: ± 5.1% Sample size: ?	November 15–19, 2015	Donald Trump; 35%	Ben Carson; 19%	Marco Rubio; 16%	Ted Cruz 13%, Jeb Bush 5%, Lindsey Graham 3%, Carly Fiorina 2%, Mike Huckabee 2%, John Kasich 2%, Chris Christie 1%, Rand Paul 1%, Rick Santorum 1%, George Pataki 0%, Bobby Jindal 0%, Jim Gilmore 0%
Public Policy Polling Margin of error: ± 3.5% Sample size: 787	November 7–8, 2015	Donald Trump; 25%	Ben Carson; 21%	Ted Cruz; 15%	Marco Rubio 13%, Jeb Bush 8%, Carly Fiorina 5%, John Kasich 3%, Lindsey Graham 2%, Mike Huckabee 2%, Rand Paul 1%, Chris Christie 1%, Rick Santorum 1%, Bobby Jindal 0%, Jim Gilmore 0%, George Pataki 0%, Undecided 3%
CBS News/YouGov Margin of error: ± 3.4% Sample size: 843	October 15–23, 2015	Donald Trump; 40%	Ben Carson; 23%	Ted Cruz; 8%	Marco Rubio 7%, Jeb Bush 6%, Carly Fiorina 3%, Lindsey Graham 2%, Mike Huckabee 2%, John Kasich 2%, Rand Paul 1%, Chris Christie 1%, Bobby Jindal 1%, Rick Santorum 1%, Jim Gilmore 0%, George Pataki 0%, No Preference 5%
Clemson-Palmetto Margin of error: ± 4% Sample size: 600	October 13–23, 2015	Donald Trump; 23%	Ben Carson; 19%	Ted Cruz; 8%	Carly Fiorina 6%, Jeb Bush 7%, Marco Rubio 5%, Lindsey Graham 3%, Rand Paul 1%, Mike Huckabee 2%, Chris Christie 1%, John Kasich 2%, Bobby Jindal 1%, Rick Santorum 0%, Jim Gilmore 0%, George Pataki 0%, undecided/DK 15%
CNN/ORC Margin of error: ± 4.5% Sample size: 521	October 3–10, 2015	Donald Trump; 36%	Ben Carson; 18%	Marco Rubio; 9%	Carly Fiorina 7%, Jeb Bush 6%, Ted Cruz 5%, Lindsey Graham 5%, Rand Paul 4%, Mike Huckabee 3%, Chris Christie 2%, John Kasich 1%, Rick Santorum 1%, Jim Gilmore *%, George Pataki *% Bobby Jindal *%, None 1%, No opinion 4%
Gravis Marketing Margin of error: ± 3.6% Sample size: 762	October 1, 2015	Donald Trump; 29.1%	Ben Carson; 16.4%	Carly Fiorina; 11.1%	Ted Cruz 8.1%, Marco Rubio 8%, Jeb Bush 5.9%, John Kasich 3.5%, Mike Huckabee 3.1%, Lindsey Graham 1.5%, Chris Christie 1.4%, Rand Paul 0.9%, Rick Santorum 0.5%, George Pataki 0.3% Bobby Jindal 0.3%, Unsure 9.9%
CBS News/YouGov Margin of error: ± 4.5% Sample size: 1002	September 3–10, 2015	Donald Trump; 36%	Ben Carson; 21%	Ted Cruz; 6%	Lindsey Graham 5%, Jeb Bush 5%, John Kasich 4%, Mike Huckabee 3%, Carly Fiorina 3%, Marco Rubio 3%, Scott Walker 3%, Chris Christie 2%, Bobby Jindal 1%, Rick Santorum 1%, Rand Paul 1%, Rick Perry 0%, George Pataki 0%, Jim Gilmore 0%, No preference 5%
Public Policy Polling Margin of error: ± 3.6% Sample size: 764	September 3–6, 2015	Donald Trump; 37%	Ben Carson; 21%	Ted Cruz; 6%	Jeb Bush 6%, Carly Fiorina 4%, John Kasich 4%, Marco Rubio 4%, Lindsey Graham 3%, Mike Huckabee 3%, Scott Walker 3%, Rand Paul 3%, Rick Santorum 2%, Rick Perry 1%, Chris Christie 1%, Bobby Jindal 1%, George Pataki 0%, Jim Gilmore 0%
Monmouth University Margin of error: ± 4.6% Sample size: 453	August 20–23, 2015	Donald Trump; 30%	Ben Carson; 15%	Jeb Bush; 9%	Carly Fiorina 6%, Marco Rubio 6%, Ted Cruz 5%, Lindsey Graham 4%, Scott Walker 4%, John Kasich 3%, Mike Huckabee 3%, Rand Paul 3%, Chris Christie 2%, Rick Santorum 1%, Rick Perry 0%, George Pataki 0%, Bobby Jindal 0%, Jim Gilmore 0%, Undecided 11%
Opinion Savvy/Insider Advantage Margin of error: ± 4.3% Sample size: 509	August 3, 2015	Donald Trump; 31.3%	Jeb Bush; 13.9%	Ben Carson; 9.9%	Mike Huckabee 8.5%, Lindsey Graham 6.5%, Scott Walker 5.8%, Ted Cruz 4.3%, Chris Christie 4.1%, John Kasich 3.1%, Marco Rubio 2.3%, Carly Fiorina 1.8%, Rand Paul 1.7%, Bobby Jindal 0.7%, Rick Perry 0.6%, Rick Santorum 0.1%, George Pataki 0%, Someone else 3.1%, Undecided 2.5%
Gravis Marketing Margin of error: ± 4.0% Sample size: 609	July 29–30, 2015	Donald Trump; 34%	Ben Carson; 10.9%	Jeb Bush; 10.5%	Scott Walker 10.3%, Marco Rubio 6%, Mike Huckabee 5.5%, Lindsey Graham 4.9%, Ted Cruz 3.4%, John Kasich 3.3%, Chris Christie 2.5%, Rick Perry 2.5%, Carly Fiorina 2.4%, Rick Santorum 1.3%, Rand Paul 1%, Bobby Jindal 0.9%, George Pataki 0.7%
Morning Consult Margin of error: ± 5.0% Sample size: 389	May 31 – June 8, 2015	Lindsey Graham; 14%	Ben Carson; 12%	Jeb Bush; 11%	Scott Walker 10%, Marco Rubio 8%, Mike Huckabee 7%, Ted Cruz 6%, Chris Christie 5%, Rand Paul 5%, Donald Trump 2%, Carly Fiorina 1%, Don't know/No Opinion/Refused 16%, Someone else 2%
Winthrop University Margin of error: ± 3.2% Sample size: 956	April 4–12, 2015	Scott Walker; 13.6%	Jeb Bush; 12.7%	Ted Cruz; 8.1%	Lindsey Graham 7.6%, Rand Paul 6.2%, Chris Christie 5%, Ben Carson 4.9%, Mike Huckabee 4.9%, Marco Rubio 4%, Rick Perry 1.9%, Donald Trump 1.9%, Bobby Jindal 0.9%, Rick Santorum 0.3%, John Bolton 0.2%, Other 1.4%, Undecided 25.1%
Gravis Marketing Margin of error: ± 3% Sample size: 1,371	March 26–27, 2015	Scott Walker; 17%	Jeb Bush; 16%	Ted Cruz; 13%	Lindsey Graham 9%, Mike Huckabee 7%, Chris Christie 6%, Marco Rubio 6%, Rand Paul 5%, Rick Santorum 2%, Carly Fiorina 2%, Undecided 18%
Gravis Marketing Margin of error: ± 3% Sample size: 792	February 24–25, 2015	Jeb Bush; 19%	Scott Walker; 17%	Lindsey Graham; 12%	Mike Huckabee 10%, Chris Christie 8%, Rand Paul 6%, Marco Rubio 6%, Ted Cruz 2%, Carly Fiorina 2%, Rick Santorum 2%, Undecided 16%
Public Policy Polling Margin of error: ± 4.3% Sample size: 525	February 12–15, 2015	Jeb Bush; 19%	Scott Walker; 18%	Ben Carson; 13%	Lindsey Graham 13%, Mike Huckabee 12%, Chris Christie 7%, Rand Paul 5%, Ted Cruz 3%, Rick Perry 3%, Other/Undecided 6%
NBC News/Marist Margin of error: ± 4.6% Sample size: 450	February 3–10, 2015	Lindsey Graham; 17%	Jeb Bush; 15%	Scott Walker; 12%	Ben Carson 10%, Mike Huckabee 10%, Rand Paul 7%, Chris Christie 6%, Rick Perry 4%, Marco Rubio 4%, Rick Santorum 3%, Ted Cruz 1%, Undecided 11%
Gravis Marketing Margin of error: ± 3% Sample size: 831	January 21–22, 2015	Mitt Romney; 20%	Jeb Bush; 16%	Scott Walker; 9%	Ted Cruz 8%, Mike Huckabee 8%, Rand Paul 7%, Marco Rubio 7%, Chris Christie 5%, Rick Perry 4%, Rick Santorum 4%, Undecided 12%
Gravis Marketing Margin of error: ± 3% Sample size: 831	January 21–22, 2015	Jeb Bush; 18%	Mike Huckabee; 11%	Scott Walker; 11%	Ted Cruz 9%, Marco Rubio 9%, Chris Christie 8%, Rand Paul 8%, Rick Perry 5%, Rick Santorum 4%, Undecided 17%
Clemson University Margin of error: ± 6% Sample size: 400	May 22–29, 2014	Jeb Bush; 22%	Chris Christie; 10%	Ted Cruz; 9%	Rand Paul 9%, Marco Rubio 6%, Bobby Jindal 3%, Undecided/Don't know 48%
Gravis Marketing Margin of error: ± 4% Sample size: 735	March 6–7, 2014	Jeb Bush; 22%	Mike Huckabee; 19%	Chris Christie; 12%	Ted Cruz 8%, Rand Paul 8%, Marco Rubio 6%, Scott Walker 5%, Rick Santorum 2%, Undecided 19%
Gravis Marketing Margin of error: ± 4% Sample size: 601	November 30 – December 2, 2013	Chris Christie; 16.6%	Jeb Bush; 16%	Mike Huckabee; 15.8%	Ted Cruz 11.1%, Rand Paul 9.7%, Marco Rubio 7.2%, Rick Santorum 2.8%, Scott Walker 2.3%, Undecided 18.5%
Harper Polling Margin of error: ± 5.03% Sample size: 379	October 27–28, 2013	Chris Christie; 19%	Ted Cruz; 17%	Rand Paul; 13%	Marco Rubio 12%, Paul Ryan 12%, Bobby Jindal 6%, Not sure 21%

== South Dakota ==
Winner: Donald Trump
Primary date: June 7, 2016

Poll source	Date	1st	2nd	3rd
Primary results	June 7, 2016	Donald Trump; 67.06%	Ted Cruz; 16.99%	John Kasich; 15.95%

== Tennessee ==
Winner: Donald Trump
Primary date: March 1, 2016

Poll source	Date	1st	2nd	3rd	Other
Primary results	March 1, 2016	Donald Trump; 38.94%	Ted Cruz; 24.71%	Marco Rubio; 21.18%	Ben Carson 7.59%, John Kasich 5.29%, Jeb Bush 1.12%, Mike Huckabee 0.28%, Rand Paul 0.27%, Chris Christie 0.15%, Carly Fiorina 0.08%, Rick Santorum 0.08%, Jim Gilmore 0.03%, Lindsey Graham 0.03%, George Pataki 0.02%
SurveyMonkey Margin of error: ± ?% Sample size: 772	February 22–29, 2016	Donald Trump; 48%	Marco Rubio; 18%	Ted Cruz; 15%	Ben Carson 10%, John Kasich 5%, Undecided 4%
NBC News/Wall Street; Journal/Marist Margin of error: ± 3.8% Sample size: 665	February 22–25, 2016	Donald Trump; 40%	Ted Cruz; 22%	Marco Rubio; 19%	Ben Carson 9%, John Kasich 6%
Vanderbilt/PSRA Margin of error: 5.6% Sample size: 495	November 11–23, 2015	Donald Trump; 29%	Ben Carson; 25%	Ted Cruz; 14%	Marco Rubio 12%, Jeb Bush 6%, Carly Fiorina 2%, Undecided 7%, Other 4%, Wouldn't Vote 1%
Opinion Savvy/Insider Advantage Margin of error: 4.6% Sample size: 440	August 2–3, 2015	Donald Trump; 35.3%	Ben Carson; 14.5%	Jeb Bush; 11.7%	Mike Huckabee 6.5%, Ted Cruz 6.2%, Scott Walker 5.8%, John Kasich 3.3%, Rand Paul 3%, Marco Rubio 2.8%, Chris Christie 1.7%, Carly Fiorina 1.7%, Bobby Jindal 1.4%, Rick Santorum 0.7%, George Pataki 0.3%, Lindsey Graham 0.2%, Rick Perry 0.2%, Someone else 1.3%, Undecided 3.5%

== Texas ==
Winner: Ted Cruz
Primary date: March 1, 2016

Poll source	Date	1st	2nd	3rd	Other
Primary results	March 1, 2016	Ted Cruz; 43.76%	Donald Trump; 26.75%	Marco Rubio; 17.74%	John Kasich 4.25%, Ben Carson 4.16%, Jeb Bush 1.25%, Rand Paul 0.28%, Mike Huckabee 0.22%, Chris Christie 0.12%, Carly Fiorina 0.11%, Rick Santorum 0.07%, Lindsey Graham 0.06%
SurveyMonkey Margin of error: ± ?% Sample size: 613	February 22–29, 2016	Ted Cruz; 33%	Donald Trump; 31%	Marco Rubio; 19%	Ben Carson 9%, John Kasich 5%, Undecided 4%
Fox News/Opinion Savvy Margin of error: ± 3.7% Sample size: 712	February 28, 2016	Ted Cruz; 36.2%	Donald Trump; 25.3%	Marco Rubio; 19.2%	John Kasich 8.5%, Ben Carson 7.9%, Undecided 2.8%
ARG Margin of error: ± 5% Sample size: 400	February 26–28, 2016	Ted Cruz; 33%	Donald Trump; 32%	Marco Rubio; 17%	John Kasich 7%, Ben Carson 6%, Undecided 5%
Emerson College Margin of error: ± 4.6% Sample size: 449	February 26–28, 2016	Ted Cruz; 35%	Donald Trump; 32%	Marco Rubio; 16%	John Kasich 9%, Ben Carson 4%
CBS/YouGov Margin of error: ± 5.6% Sample size: 796	February 22–26, 2016	Ted Cruz; 42%	Donald Trump; 31%	Marco Rubio; 19%	John Kasich 4%, Ben Carson 4%
Monmouth University Margin of error: ± 4.6% Sample size: 456	February 22–24, 2016	Ted Cruz; 38%	Donald Trump; 23%	Marco Rubio; 21%	Ben Carson 6%, John Kasich 5%, Other 1%, Undecided 6%
Emerson College Margin of error: ± 4.6% Sample size: 446	February 21–23, 2016	Ted Cruz; 29%	Donald Trump; 28%	Marco Rubio; 25%	John Kasich 9%, Ben Carson 4%, Other 1%, Undecided 5%
NBC News/Wall Street; Journal/Marist Margin of error: ± 4.2% Sample size: 537	February 18–23, 2016	Ted Cruz; 39%	Donald Trump; 26%	Marco Rubio; 16%	Ben Carson 8%, John Kasich 6%
KTVT-CBS 11/ Dixie Strategies Margin of error: ± 3.64% Sample size: 725	February 22, 2016	Ted Cruz; 33.24%	Donald Trump; 24.83%	Marco Rubio; 14.76%	John Kasich 8%, Ben Carson 5.79%, Undecided 13.38%
TEGNA/SurveyUSA Margin of error: ± 3.9% Sample size: 645	February 21–22, 2016	Ted Cruz; 32%	Donald Trump; 32%	Marco Rubio; 17%	John Kasich 6%, Ben Carson 5%, Other 2%, Undecided 5%
Austin American-Statesman Margin of error: ± 4% Sample size: 620	February 19–22, 2016	Ted Cruz; 38%	Donald Trump; 26%	Marco Rubio; 13%	John Kasich 7%, Ben Carson 6%, Other 2%, Not Sure 7%
University of Houston Margin of error: ± 4.8% Sample size: 415	February 12–22, 2016	Ted Cruz; 35%	Donald Trump; 20%	Marco Rubio; 8%	Ben Carson 7%, Jeb Bush 5%, John Kasich 4%, Undecided 19%, Refused 2%
University of Texas/ Texas Tribune Margin of error: ± 4.21% Sample size: 526	February 12–19, 2016	Ted Cruz; 37%	Donald Trump; 29%	Marco Rubio; 15%	Jeb Bush 6%, John Kasich 5%, Ben Carson 4%, Rand Paul 2%, Carly Fiorina 1%, Rick Santorum 1%, Elizabeth Gray 1%
KTVT-CBS 11/ Dixie Strategies Margin of error: ± 3.1% Sample size: 1001	January 25–26, 2016	Ted Cruz; 30.27%	Donald Trump; 25.27%	Marco Rubio; 11.99%	Jeb Bush 8.19%, Ben Carson 5.29%, Chris Christie 3.3%, John Kasich 2.6%, Carly Fiorina 2.3%, Mike Huckabee 1.4%, Rand Paul 0.5%, Rick Santorum 0.3%, Jim Gilmore 0.1%, Undecided 8.49%
CBS/YouGov Margin of error: ± 4.4% Sample size: 984	January 18–21, 2016	Ted Cruz; 45%	Donald Trump; 30%	Marco Rubio; 8%	Ben Carson 5%, Jeb Bush 4%, Chris Christie 2%, Rand Paul 2%, Carly Fiorina 1%, Mike Huckabee 1%, John Kasich 1%, Jim Gilmore 0%, Rick Santorum 0%, No preference 1%
UT/Texas Tribune Margin of error: ± 4.21% Sample size: 542	October 30 – November 8, 2015	Ted Cruz; 27%	Donald Trump; 27%	Ben Carson; 13%	Marco Rubio 9%, Jeb Bush 4%, Carly Fiorina 4%, Rand Paul 4%, Mike Huckabee 2%, Chris Christie 1%, Rick Santorum 1%, John Kasich 1%, Bobby Jindal 0%, George Pataki 0%, Lindsey Graham 0%, Jim Gilmore 0%, No opinion 5%, Other 2%, Undecided 10%
CBS-DFW Margin of error: ± 3.02% Sample size: 1051	October 23–24, 2015	Ben Carson; 22.93%	Donald Trump; 22.17%	Ted Cruz; 14.27%	Jeb Bush 12.65%, Marco Rubio 6.57%, Carly Fiorina 4.57%, Mike Huckabee 3.14%, Chris Christie 2.47%, Rand Paul 1.33%, Undecided 9.90%
Texas Lyceum Margin of error: ± 6.01% Sample size: 231	September 8–21, 2015	Donald Trump; 21%	Ted Cruz; 16%	Ben Carson; 12%	Jeb Bush 10%, Carly Fiorina 6%, Marco Rubio 3%, Mike Huckabee 2%, Rick Perry 1%, Rand Paul 1%, John Kasich 1%, Bobby Jindal 1%, Rick Santorum 1%, George Pataki 1%, Lindsey Graham 0%, Chris Christie 0%, Jim Gilmore 0%, Scott Walker 0%, No opinion 5%
Gravis Marketing Margin of error: ± 3% Sample size: 976	August 20, 2015	Donald Trump; 24%	Ted Cruz; 16%	Ben Carson; 12%	Jeb Bush 9%, Carly Fiorina 5%, Marco Rubio 5%, Rick Perry 4%, Mike Huckabee 4%, Scott Walker 4%, Other/Unsure 16%
Opinion Savvy/Insider Advantage Margin of error: ± 4.3% Sample size: 504	August 2–3, 2015	Ted Cruz; 20%	Donald Trump; 19.4%	Jeb Bush; 16.9%	Ben Carson 10.5%, Scott Walker 6.9%, Mike Huckabee 3.9%, John Kasich 3.7%, Bobby Jindal 2.5%, Marco Rubio 2.4%, Rick Perry 2.3%, Rand Paul 2.2%, Carly Fiorina 2.1%, Chris Christie 1.5%, Lindsey Graham 0.9%, George Pataki 0.3%, Rick Santorum 0.3%, Other 2%, Undecided 2.6%
UoT/Texas Tribune Margin of error: ± 4.75% Sample size: 504	June 5–14, 2015	Ted Cruz; 20%	Rick Perry; 12%	Scott Walker; 10%	Marco Rubio 8%, Jeb Bush 7%, Ben Carson 6%, Rand Paul 6%, Mike Huckabee 5%, Carly Fiorina 3%, Rick Santorum 2%, Donald Trump 2%, Chris Christie 1%, Bobby Jindal 1%, John Kasich 1%, Lindsey Graham 1%, George Pataki 0%, No opinion 15%
UoT/Texas Tribune Margin of error: ± 4.19% Sample size: 547	February 6–15, 2015	Ted Cruz; 20%	Scott Walker; 19%	Jeb Bush; 9%	Ben Carson 9%, Rick Perry 8%, Mike Huckabee 5%, Rand Paul 4%, Marco Rubio 4%, Sarah Palin 3%, Chris Christie 2%, Bobby Jindal 1%, John Kasich 1%, Rick Santorum 1%, John Bolton 0%, Carly Fiorina 0%, Lindsey Graham 0%, Undecided 13%
UoT/Texas Tribune Margin of error: ± 4.14% Sample size: 560	October 10–19, 2014	Ted Cruz; 27%	Rick Perry; 14%	Ben Carson; 10%	Jeb Bush 7%, Mike Huckabee 7%, Rand Paul 7%, Paul Ryan 4%, Chris Christie 3%, Marco Rubio 3%, Bobby Jindal 2%, Scott Walker 2%, Rick Santorum 1%, John Kasich 0%, Undecided 11%
UoT/Texas Tribune Margin of error: ± 4.37% Sample size: 504	May 30 – June 8, 2014	Ted Cruz; 33%	Rand Paul; 9%	Mike Huckabee; 8%	Jeb Bush 7%, Rick Perry 7%, Marco Rubio 6%, Paul Ryan 6%, Scott Walker 4%, Chris Christie 3%, Bobby Jindal 2%, Rick Santorum 1%, Undecided 13%
Public Policy Polling Margin of error: ± 5.7% Sample size: 294	April 10–13, 2014	Ted Cruz; 25%	Jeb Bush; 14%	Mike Huckabee; 10%	Rand Paul 10%, Rick Perry 10%, Chris Christie 5%, Paul Ryan 5%, Bobby Jindal 4%, Marco Rubio 4%, Other/Undecided 12%
UoT/Texas Tribune Margin of error: ± 4.21% Sample size: 543	February 7–17, 2014	Ted Cruz; 28%	Rand Paul; 10%	Rick Perry; 10%	Jeb Bush 8%, Paul Ryan 8%, Bobby Jindal 6%, Marco Rubio 6%, Scott Walker 6%, Chris Christie 4%, Rick Santorum 4%, Undecided 12%
Public Policy Polling Margin of error: ± 5% Sample size: 388	November 1–4, 2013	Ted Cruz; 32%	Jeb Bush; 13%	Chris Christie; 13%	Rand Paul 10%, Bobby Jindal 6%, Marco Rubio 5%, Paul Ryan 5%, Rick Perry 3%, Rick Santorum 3%, Someone Else/Undecided 10%
Public Policy Polling Margin of error: ± 5.5% Sample size: 318	June 28 – July 1, 2013	Ted Cruz; 27%	Jeb Bush; 15%	Chris Christie; 11%	Rand Paul 11%, Paul Ryan 9%, Rick Perry 7%, Marco Rubio 6%, Rick Santorum 4%, Bobby Jindal 3%, Someone Else/Undecided 8%
UoT/Texas Tribune Margin of error: ± 5.27% Sample size: 492	May 31 – June 9, 2013	Ted Cruz; 25%	Rand Paul; 13%	Marco Rubio; 11%	Rick Perry 10%, Chris Christie 8%, Paul Ryan 8%, Rick Santorum 2%, Bobby Jindal 2%, Don't Know 21%
Public Policy Polling Margin of error: ± 4.9% Sample size: 400	Jan. 24–27, 2013	Marco Rubio; 21%	Mike Huckabee; 14%	Rand Paul; 13%	Jeb Bush 11%, Paul Ryan 11%, Chris Christie 9%, Bobby Jindal 4%, Rick Perry 4%, Susana Martinez 2%, Someone Else/Undecided 10%

== Utah ==
Winner: Ted Cruz
Primary date: March 22, 2016

Poll source	Date	1st	2nd	3rd	Other
Caucus results	March 22, 2016	Ted Cruz; 69.17%	John Kasich; 16.81%	Donald Trump; 14.03%	
Y2 Analytics Margin of error: ± 4.38% Sample size: 500	March 17–19, 2016	Ted Cruz; 53%	John Kasich; 29%	Donald Trump; 11%	Other 2%, Undecided 5%
Dan Jones and Associates Margin of error: ± 7% Sample size: 215	March 8–15, 2016	Ted Cruz; 42%	Donald Trump; 21%	Marco Rubio 17%	John Kasich 13%, Undecided 7%
Dan Jones and Associates Margin of error: ± 3.92% Sample size: 625	February 10–15, 2016	Marco Rubio; 24%	Ted Cruz; 22%	Donald Trump; 18%	Jeb Bush 9%, Ben Carson 9%, John Kasich 4%, Other 2%, Undecided 11%
Salt Lake Tribune/SurveyUSA Margin of error: ± 4.9% Sample size: 989	January 6–13, 2016	Ted Cruz; 18%	Donald Trump; 17%	Ben Carson; 15%	Marco Rubio 15%, Jeb Bush 7%, Carly Fiorina 5%, Rand Paul 4%, Chris Christie 2%, John Kasich 1%, Rick Santorum 0%, Mike Huckabee 0%, Undecided 16%
Dan Jones and Associates Margin of error: ± 3.93% Sample size: 622	December 8–14, 2015	Ted Cruz; 20%	Ben Carson; 18%	Marco Rubio; 18%	Donald Trump 12%, Other/Don't know ?%
Dan Jones and Associates Margin of error: ± 4% Sample size: 604	September 8–17, 2015	Ben Carson; 23%	Donald Trump; 15%	Jeb Bush; 12%	Other/Don't know ?%
Dan Jones and Associates Margin of error: ± ? Sample size: ?	July 14–21, 2015	Jeb Bush; 22%	Scott Walker; 11%	Marco Rubio; 9%	Donald Trump 8%, Other/Don't know ?%
Dan Jones & Associates Margin of error: ±4.86% Sample size: 406	March 3–5, 2015	Jeb Bush; 14%	Scott Walker; 12%	Rand Paul; 12%	Marco Rubio 5%, Chris Christie 4%, Lindsey Graham 2%, Bobby Jindal 1%, Other/Don't know 50%

== Vermont ==
Winner: Donald Trump
Primary date: March 1, 2016

Poll source	Date	1st	2nd	3rd	Other
Primary results	March 1, 2016	Donald Trump; 32.34%	John Kasich; 30.01%	Marco Rubio; 19.08%	Ted Cruz 9.61%, Ben Carson 4.13%, Jeb Bush 1.79%, Rand Paul 0.68%, Chris Christie 0.58%, Carly Fiorina 0.34%, Rick Santorum 0.27%
Castleton University/Vermont; Public Radio Margin of error: ± 9.01% Sample size: 118	February 3–17, 2016	Donald Trump; 32.4%	Marco Rubio; 16.9%	Ted Cruz; 10.5%	John Kasich 10.0%, Jeb Bush 7.7%, Ben Carson 3.1%, Chris Christie 2.4%, Carly Fiorina 1.0%, Rick Santorum 0.6%, Someone else 3.3%, Not sure/Don't know 12.1%

== Virginia ==
Winner: Donald Trump
Primary date: March 1, 2016

Poll source	Date	1st	2nd	3rd	Other
Primary results	March 1, 2016	Donald Trump; 34.80%	Marco Rubio; 31.98%	Ted Cruz; 16.69%	John Kasich 9.54%, Ben Carson 5.87%, Jeb Bush 0.36%, Rand Paul 0.28%, Mike Huckabee 0.14%, Chris Christie 0.11%, Carly Fiorina 0.09%, Jim Gilmore 0.06%, Lindsey Graham 0.04%, Rick Santorum 0.04%
SurveyMonkey Margin of error: ± ?% Sample size: 848	February 22–29, 2016	Donald Trump; 36%	Marco Rubio; 26%	Ted Cruz; 13%	Ben Carson 11%, John Kasich 7%, Undecided 8%
CBS/YouGov Margin of error: ± 8.6% Sample size: 481	February 22–26, 2016	Donald Trump; 40%	Marco Rubio; 27%	Ted Cruz; 22%	John Kasich 6%, Ben Carson 4%, Undecided 1%
Monmouth University Margin of error: ± 4.8% Sample size: 421	February 22–24, 2016	Donald Trump; 41%	Marco Rubio; 27%	Ted Cruz; 14%	John Kasich 7%, Ben Carson 7%, Undecided 4%
Roanoke College Margin of error: ± 4.5% Sample size: 466	February 16–24, 2016	Donald Trump; 38%	Ted Cruz; 15%	Marco Rubio; 13%	John Kasich 8%, Ben Carson 8%, Undecided 19%
Christopher Newport University Margin of error: ± 5.6% Sample size: 368	February 3–14, 2016	Donald Trump; 28%	Marco Rubio; 22%	Ted Cruz; 19%	Ben Carson 7%, John Kasich 7%, Jeb Bush 4%, Chris Christie 4%, Carly Fiorina 2%, Jim Gilmore <1%, Someone else 1%, Undecided 6%
University of Mary Washington Margin of error: ± ?% Sample size: 333	November 4–9, 2015	Ben Carson; 29%	Donald Trump; 24%	Marco Rubio; 11%	Ted Cruz 10%, Jeb Bush 5%, Carly Fiorina 5%, Rand Paul 4%, Chris Christie 4%, Mike Huckabee 4%, John Kasich 1%, Jim Gilmore 0%, Don't know 2%
Christopher Newport University Margin of error: ± 5.1% Sample size: 412	September 29 – October 8, 2015	Donald Trump; 23%	Ben Carson; 17%	Marco Rubio; 14%	Carly Fiorina 13%, Jeb Bush 9%, Ted Cruz 5%, Chris Christie 4%, Mike Huckabee 3%, John Kasich 2%, Rand Paul 2%, Lindsey Graham 1%, Bobby Jindal <1%, George Pataki <1%, Rick Santorum <1%, Jim Gilmore <1%, Someone else 1%, Undecided 5%
Opinion Savvy/Insider Advantage Margin of error: ± 4.1% Sample size: 504	August 2–3, 2015	Donald Trump; 27.9%	Jeb Bush; 14.8%	Scott Walker; 10.1%	Ben Carson 8%, Carly Fiorina 6.8%, Ted Cruz 6.4%, Rand Paul 5.1%, Marco Rubio 3.5%, John Kasich 3.2%, Chris Christie 3.1%, Rick Perry 2.3%, Mike Huckabee 1.5%, Bobby Jindal 1%, Lindsey Graham 0.7%, George Pataki 0.7%, Rick Santorum 0%, Someone else 1.8%, Undecided 3.2%
Public Policy Polling Margin of error: ± 4.4% Sample size: 502	July 13–15, 2015	Jeb Bush; 18%	Donald Trump; 14%	Scott Walker; 14%	Ben Carson 10%, Mike Huckabee 8%, Marco Rubio 7%, Chris Christie 5%, Ted Cruz 5%, Carly Fiorina 5%, Rand Paul 5%, Bobby Jindal 3%, Rick Perry 2%, Jim Gilmore 1%, Lindsey Graham 1%, John Kasich 1%, Rick Santorum 1%, George Pataki 0%, Someone else/Not sure 3%
Christopher Newport University Margin of error: ± ? Sample size: ?	April 13–24, 2015	Jeb Bush; 17%	Marco Rubio; 16%	Chris Christie; 10%	Rand Paul 10%, Scott Walker 10%, Ben Carson 7%, Ted Cruz 7%, Mike Huckabee 6%, Donald Trump 5%, Bobby Jindal 2%, Carly Fiorina 1%, John Kasich <1%, Rick Perry <1%, Rick Santorum <1%, Someone else <1%, Undecided 7%
Christopher Newport University Margin of error: ± 3.6% Sample size: 794	January 30 – February 10, 2015	Jeb Bush; 21%	Scott Walker; 16%	Chris Christie; 10%	Mike Huckabee 10%, Ben Carson 9%, Rand Paul 6%, Marco Rubio 6%, Paul Ryan 5%, Ted Cruz 3%, John Kasich 3%, Bobby Jindal 2%, Mike Pence 1%, Rick Perry 1%, Rob Portman 1%, Rick Santorum 1%, Someone else 1%, Undecided 4%
Christopher Newport University Margin of error: ± 5.3% Sample size: 338	February 23–28, 2014	Chris Christie; 19%	Jeb Bush; 18%	Mike Huckabee; 13%	Paul Ryan 13%, Ted Cruz 9%, Rand Paul 7%, Marco Rubio 4%, Scott Walker 3%, Undecided 13%
University of Mary Washington Margin of error: ±? Sample size: ?	September 25–29, 2013	Chris Christie; 20%	Jeb Bush; 10%	Rand Paul; 10%	Paul Ryan 8%, Marco Rubio 7%, Ted Cruz 5%, None 14%, Don't know 19%
Public Policy Polling Margin of error: ±4.8% Sample size: 415	July 11–14, 2013	Jeb Bush; 16%	Chris Christie; 16%	Rand Paul; 15%	Marco Rubio 12%, Paul Ryan 11%, Ted Cruz 9%, Bob McDonnell 8%, Bobby Jindal 4%, Rick Santorum 2%, Someone Else/Undecided 7%
Public Policy Polling Margin of error: ±4.4% Sample size: 500	May 24–26, 2013	Marco Rubio; 17%	Chris Christie; 15%	Jeb Bush; 14%	Bob McDonnell 12%, Rand Paul 10%, Ted Cruz 8%, Paul Ryan 8%, Bobby Jindal 3%, Rick Santorum 2%, Someone Else/Undecided 11%
Public Policy Polling Margin of error: ±4.4% Sample size: 500	May 24–26, 2013	Chris Christie; 20%	Marco Rubio; 20%	Jeb Bush; 17%	Paul Ryan 10%, Rand Paul 9%, Ted Cruz 8%, Bobby Jindal 3%, Rick Santorum 2%, Someone Else/Undecided 10%
University of Mary Washington Margin of error: ±? Sample size: ?	March 20–24, 2013	Chris Christie; 18%	Bob McDonnell; 12%	Rand Paul; 11%	Paul Ryan 11%, Marco Rubio 9%, Jeb Bush 8%, Other 1%, None 10%, Don't know 17%

== Washington ==
Winner: Donald Trump
Primary date: May 24, 2016

Poll source	Date	1st	2nd	3rd	Other
Primary results	May 10, 2016	Donald Trump; 75.82%	Ted Cruz; 10.48%	John Kasich; 9.81%	Ben Carson 3.89%
Townhall/Gravis Insights Margin of error: ± 4% Sample size: 523	May 18–19, 2015	Rand Paul; 13.2%	Scott Walker; 12.4%	Jeb Bush; 11.5%	Marco Rubio 11.3%, Ben Carson 7.6%, Chris Christie 6%, Ted Cruz 5%, Mike Huckabee 5%, Carly Fiorina 3%, Rick Santorum 2%, Unsure 23%
Public Policy Polling Margin of error: ± 5.1% Sample size: 372	May 14–17, 2015	Scott Walker; 18%	Marco Rubio; 15%	Mike Huckabee; 13%	Ted Cruz 11%, Jeb Bush 10%, Ben Carson 10%, Chris Christie 6%, Rand Paul 5%, Rick Perry 3%, Someone else/Not sure 7%

== West Virginia ==
Winner: Donald Trump
Primary date: May 10, 2016

Poll source	Date	1st	2nd	3rd	Other
Primary results	May 10, 2016	Donald Trump; 77.01%	Ted Cruz; 8.98%	John Kasich; 6.74%	Ben Carson 2.17%, Marco Rubio 1.43%, Jeb Bush 1.14%, Rand Paul 0.89%, Mike Huckabee 0.87%, Chris Christie 0.36%, Carly Fiorina 0.33%
R.L. Repass & Partners/MetroNews Margin of error: ± 4% Sample size: 228	April 22– May 2, 2016	Donald Trump; 57%	Ted Cruz; 25%	John Kasich; 14%	Undecided 4%
Public Policy Polling Margin of error: ± 4.2% Sample size: 549	April 29– May 1, 2016	Donald Trump; 61%	Ted Cruz; 22%	John Kasich; 14%	Undecided 3%
Metro News Margin of error: ± ?% Sample size: 159	February 11–16, 2016	Donald Trump; 40%	Ted Cruz; 20%	Marco Rubio; 15%	Ben Carson 10%, John Kasich 6%, Jeb Bush 4%, Carly Fiorina <1%, Chris Christie <1%, Not Sure 4%
Orion Strategies Margin of error: ± 4.9% Sample size: 406	August 25, 2015	Donald Trump; 29%	Marco Rubio; 8%	Ben Carson; 7%	Jeb Bush 7%, Mike Huckabee 7%, Ted Cruz 5%, Scott Walker 2%, Carly Fiorina 2%, John Kasich 1%, Rand Paul 1%, Undecided 32%
Harper Polling Margin of error: ± 6.3% Sample size: 242	April 9–11, 2015	Jeb Bush; 23%	Mike Huckabee; 20%	Scott Walker; 13%	Ben Carson 8%, Ted Cruz 8%, Rand Paul 7%, Chris Christie 5%, Marco Rubio 4%, Rick Santorum 1%, Undecided 11%

== Wisconsin ==
Winner: Ted Cruz
Primary date: April 5, 2016

Poll source	Date	1st	2nd	3rd	Other
Primary results	April 5, 2016	Ted Cruz; 48.20%	Donald Trump; 35.02%	John Kasich; 14.10%	Marco Rubio 0.96%, Ben Carson 0.51%, Jeb Bush 0.28%, Rand Paul 0.23%, Mike Huckabee 0.13%, Chris Christie 0.11%, Carly Fiorina 0.07%, Rick Santorum 0.05%, Jim Gilmore 0.02%
ARG Margin of error: ± 5% Sample size: 400	April 1–3, 2016	Donald Trump; 42%	Ted Cruz; 32%	John Kasich 23%	Undecided 3%
Emerson College Margin of error: ± 4.1% Sample size: 549	March 30 - April 3, 2016	Ted Cruz; 40%	Donald Trump; 35%	John Kasich; 21%	Undecided 4%
CBS News/YouGov Margin of error: ± 5.7% Sample size: 675	March 29-April 1, 2016	Ted Cruz; 43%	Donald Trump; 37%	John Kasich; 18%	Other/Don't Know 2%
Fox Business News Margin of error: ± 3.5% Sample size: 742	March 28–30, 2016	Ted Cruz; 42%	Donald Trump; 32%	John Kasich; 19%	Other 1%, Don't Know 5%
Loras College Margin of error: ± 4.8% Sample size: 416	March 28–30, 2016	Ted Cruz; 38%	Donald Trump; 31%	John Kasich; 18%	Undecided 13%
Public Policy Polling Margin of error: ± 3.5% Sample size: 768	March 28–29, 2016	Ted Cruz; 38%	Donald Trump; 37%	John Kasich; 17%	Undecided 9%
Marquette University Margin of error: ± 5.8% Sample size: 471	March 24–28, 2016	Ted Cruz; 39.6%	Donald Trump; 30.4%	John Kasich; 21.4%	Someone Else 0.3%, Undecided 7.7%
Optimus Margin of error: ± 1.1% Sample size: 6182	March 20–24, 2016	Donald Trump; 29.4%	John Kasich; 27.1%	Ted Cruz; 25%	Undecided 18.6%
Emerson College Margin of error: ± 4.6% Sample size: 439	March 20–22, 2016	Ted Cruz; 36%	Donald Trump; 35%	John Kasich; 19%	Undecided 10%
Marquette University Margin of error: ± 7.5% Sample size: 297	February 18–21, 2016	Donald Trump; 30%	Marco Rubio; 20%	Ted Cruz; 19%	Ben Carson 8%, John Kasich 8%, Jeb Bush 3%, Undecided 10%
Marquette University Margin of error: ± 6.5% Sample size: 313	January 21–24, 2016	Donald Trump; 24%	Marco Rubio; 18%	Ted Cruz; 16%	Ben Carson 8%, Chris Christie 5%, Rand Paul 3%, Carly Fiorina 3%, Jeb Bush 2%, John Kasich 2%, Mike Huckabee 1%, Rick Santorum 0%, Undecided 17%
Marquette University Margin of error: ± 6.6% Sample size: 326	November 12–15, 2015	Ben Carson; 22%	Donald Trump; 19%	Marco Rubio; 19%	Ted Cruz 9%, Jeb Bush 6%, Carly Fiorina 5%, Chris Christie 4%, Rand Paul 1%, Mike Huckabee 1%, John Kasich 1%, George Pataki <0.5%, Jim Gilmore <0.5%, Someone else 0.6%, Undecided 9.8%
Marquette University Margin of error: ± 6.5% Sample size: 321	September 24–28, 2015	Donald Trump; 20.1%	Ben Carson; 16.2%	Marco Rubio; 14.4%	Carly Fiorina 10.8%, Jeb Bush 6.6%, Ted Cruz 5.1%, Rand Paul 4.5%, Mike Huckabee 3.4%, Chris Christie 3.1%, John Kasich 2.8%, Rick Santorum 1.2%, Bobby Jindal 0.5%, George Pataki 0.4%, Jim Gilmore 0.2%, Someone else 0.6%, Undecided 9.8%
Marquette University Margin of error: ± 6.6% Sample size: 334	August 13–16, 2015	Scott Walker; 25%	Ben Carson; 13%	Donald Trump; 9%	Ted Cruz 8%, Carly Fiorina 7%, Marco Rubio 7%, Jeb Bush 6%, Mike Huckabee 4%, Bobby Jindal 2%, Chris Christie 2%, Rand Paul 2%, Rick Perry 1%, John Kasich 1%, Jim Gilmore 1%, Rick Santorum 1%, George Pataki 0%, Lindsey Graham 0%
Marquette University Margin of error: ± 5.6% Sample size: 319	April 7–10, 2015	Scott Walker; 40%	Rand Paul; 10.3%	Jeb Bush; 7.9%	Ted Cruz 6%, Chris Christie 5.8%, Mike Huckabee 5.1%, Ben Carson 5%, Marco Rubio 3.8%, Bobby Jindal 2.3%, Rick Santorum 1.9%, Carly Fiorina 0.5%, Rick Perry 0.5%, Someone else 1.7%, Don't know 8.9%
Public Policy Polling Margin of error: ± 4.6% Sample size: 461	March 6–8, 2015	Scott Walker; 53%	Ben Carson; 12%	Jeb Bush; 8%	Rand Paul 6%, Marco Rubio 6%, Chris Christie 4%, Mike Huckabee 3%, Ted Cruz 2%, Rick Perry 1%, Undecided 5%
Public Policy Polling Margin of error: ± 4.3% Sample size: 522	April 17–20, 2014	Paul Ryan; 25%	Scott Walker; 21%	Chris Christie; 8%	Mike Huckabee 8%, Rand Paul 8%, Ted Cruz 7%, Jeb Bush 6%, Marco Rubio 6%, Bobby Jindal 3%, Someone else/Not sure 8%
Magellan Strategies Margin of error: ± ? Sample size: ?	April 14–15, 2014	Scott Walker; 37%	Rand Paul; 12%	Ted Cruz; 9%	Mike Huckabee 9%, Jeb Bush 8%, Marco Rubio 8%, Chris Christie 4%, John Kasich 1%, Undecided 12%
Marquette University Law School Margin of error: ± 5% Sample size: 337	October 21–27, 2013	Scott Walker; 28.9%	Paul Ryan; 24.6%	Marco Rubio; 9.3%	Chris Christie 8.6%, Rand Paul 8.4%, Ted Cruz 4.3%, Jeb Bush 2.4%, Someone else 4.2%, Don't know 8.9%
Public Policy Polling Margin of error: ± 4.6% Sample size: 447	September 13–16, 2013	Paul Ryan; 27%	Scott Walker; 14%	Chris Christie; 12%	Marco Rubio 10%, Ted Cruz 9%, Jeb Bush 8%, Rand Paul 8%, Bobby Jindal 3%, Rick Santorum 3%, Someone else/Not sure 5%
Public Policy Polling Margin of error: ± 4.6% Sample size: 447	September 13–16, 2013	Paul Ryan; 33%	Chris Christie; 14%	Jeb Bush; 11%	Rand Paul 11%, Ted Cruz 10%, Marco Rubio 9%, Rick Santorum 6%, Bobby Jindal 3%, Someone else/Not sure 5%
Public Policy Polling Margin of error: ± 4.6% Sample size: 447	September 13–16, 2013	Scott Walker; 37%	Chris Christie; 13%	Jeb Bush; 11%	Ted Cruz 10%, Rand Paul 10%, Marco Rubio 9%, Rick Santorum 4%, Bobby Jindal 2%, Someone else/Not sure 3%
Public Policy Polling Margin of error: ± 4.6% Sample size: 447	September 13–16, 2013	Paul Ryan; 47%	Scott Walker; 38%		Not sure 15%
Marquette University Law School Margin of error: ± 5.8% Sample size: 302	May 6–9, 2013	Paul Ryan; 27.1%	Marco Rubio; 21.2%	Scott Walker; 16.1%	Chris Christie 10.6%, Rand Paul 6.9%, Jeb Bush 4.6%, Bobby Jindal 0.8%, Someone Else 1.6%, Don't Know 10.5%
Public Policy Polling Margin of error: ± 3.8% Sample size: 679	February 21–24, 2013	Paul Ryan; 35%	Marco Rubio; 22%	Chris Christie; 10%	Rand Paul 8%, Mike Huckabee 7%, Jeb Bush 5%, Bobby Jindal 3%, Susana Martinez 1%, Rick Perry 1%, Someone Else/Undecided 8%
Public Policy Polling Margin of error: ± 3.8% Sample size: 679	February 21–24, 2013	Scott Walker; 33%	Marco Rubio; 27%	Chris Christie; 10%	Mike Huckabee 7%, Rand Paul 6%, Jeb Bush 5%, Bobby Jindal 3%, Susana Martinez 2%, Rick Perry 0%, Someone Else/Undecided 8%

== Wyoming ==
Poll source	Date	1st	2nd	3rd	Other
Convention results	March 12, 2016	Ted Cruz; 66.3%	Marco Rubio; 19.5%	Donald Trump; 7.2%	John Kasich 0.0%, Uncommitted 7.0%, Other 0.0%
Public Policy Polling Margin of error: ±3.5% Sample size: 780	July 19–21, 2013	Rand Paul; 19%	Chris Christie; 14%	Jeb Bush; 13%	Paul Ryan 11%, Ted Cruz 9%, Marco Rubio 9%, Rick Santorum 4%, Bobby Jindal 3%, Susana Martinez 1%, Other/Undecided 18%
Harper Polling Margin of error: ±4.77% Sample size: 422	July 17–18, 2013	Paul Ryan; 15%	Rand Paul; 12%	Jeb Bush; 10%	Chris Christie 10%, Marco Rubio 10%, Ted Cruz 5%, Rick Santorum 3%, Bobby Jindal 2%, Scott Walker 1%, Undecided 33%

== See also ==
General election polling

- Nationwide opinion polling for the United States presidential election, 2016
- Nationwide opinion polling for the United States presidential election by demographics, 2016
- Statewide opinion polling for the United States presidential election, 2016

Democratic primary polling

- Nationwide opinion polling for the Democratic Party 2016 presidential primaries
- Statewide opinion polling for the Democratic Party presidential primaries, 2016

Republican primary polling

- Nationwide opinion polling for the Republican Party 2016 presidential primaries
