= North Park =

North Park (or NorthPark or Northpark) may refer to:

== Shopping malls ==
=== United States ===
- Northpark Plaza Shopping Center, a shopping center in the Northwood community of Irvine, California
- North Park Mall (Indiana), now known as Five Points Mall, a shopping mall in Marion, Indiana
- NorthPark Mall (Iowa), a shopping mall in Davenport, Iowa
- Northpark Mall (Mississippi), a shopping mall in Ridgeland, Mississippi
- Northpark Mall (Missouri), a shopping mall in Joplin, Missouri
- NorthPark Mall (Oklahoma), a shopping mall in Oklahoma City, Oklahoma
- NorthPark Center, a shopping mall in Dallas, Texas

=== Other places ===
- Northpark Shopping Centre, a shopping centre near Sefton Park, South Australia, Australia

== Educational institutions ==
- North Park Academy, Public School 66 in the Buffalo Public Schools system of Buffalo, New York, United States
- North Park Collegiate and Vocational School, a public secondary school in Brantford, Ontario, Canada
- North Park Elementary School, site of an April 10, 2017 shooting, San Bernardino, California, United States
- North Park Secondary School, a public secondary school in Brampton, Ontario, Canada
- North Park Theological Seminary, in Chicago, Illinois, United States
- North Park University, formerly known as North Park Junior College, in Chicago, Illinois, United States

== Places ==
=== United Kingdom ===
- North Park, Whalsay, hamlet in southwestern Whalsay in the parish of Nesting in the Shetland Islands of Scotland
- North Park House, location of Queen Margaret College in Glasgow, Scotland
- Northpark Copse, a 9.9-hectare (24-acre) Site of Special Scientific Interest east of Shalfleet on the Isle of Wight

=== United States ===
- North Park Blocks form a city park in downtown Portland, Oregon
- North Park, Buffalo, New York, a neighborhood
- North Park, Chicago, Illinois, a neighborhood
- North Park (Colorado basin), a valley in the Rocky Mountains in north central Colorado
- North Park, Dallas, Texas, a neighborhood also known historically as Elm Thicket
- North Park Formation, a geologic formation in Wyoming
- North Park Natural Area, a protected area of the valley in Jackson County, Colorado
- North Park (Pittsburgh), a county park in Allegheny County, Pennsylvania
- North Park, San Diego, California, a neighborhood
- North Park Theatre, an historical single screen movie house in Buffalo, New York
- North Park Towers, a pair of apartment buildings in Southfield, Michigan

=== Other places ===
- North Park Nature Reserve, a protected area along the banks of the Umhlatuzana River, near Queensburgh in KwaZulu-Natal, South Africa
- North Park, Saskatoon, Canada a neighbourhood
- Northpark, New Zealand, a suburb of Auckland
- North Park (Melbourne), a former mansion in Melbourne, Victoria, Australia

== Other uses ==
- North Park phacelia or Phacelia formosula, a rare species of flowering plant in the borage family

== See also ==
- North Point Park (disambiguation)
- Northpark Mall (disambiguation)
