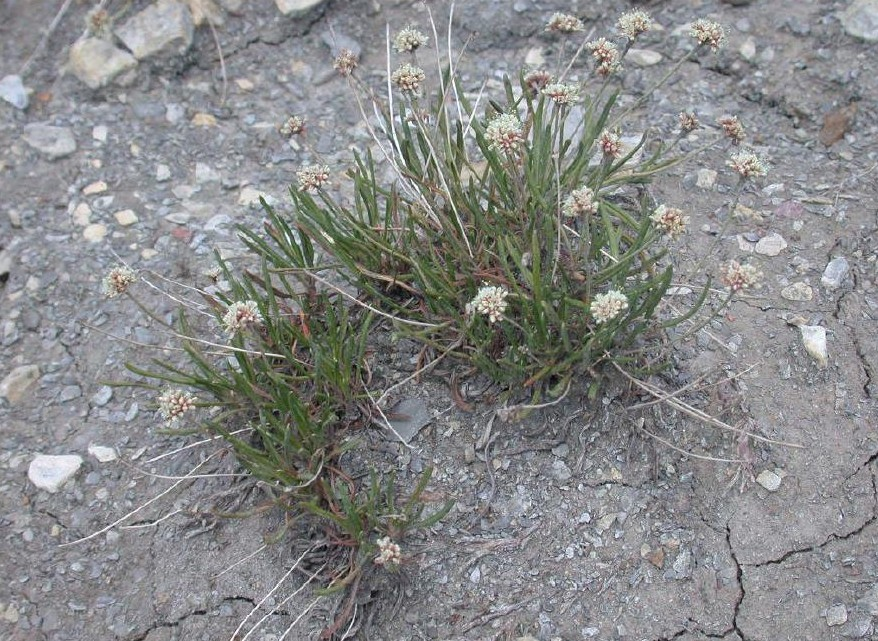

Conservation status
- Vulnerable (NatureServe)

Scientific classification
- Kingdom: Plantae
- Clade: Embryophytes
- Clade: Tracheophytes
- Clade: Angiosperms
- Clade: Eudicots
- Order: Caryophyllales
- Family: Polygonaceae
- Genus: Eriogonum
- Species: E. exilifolium

Binomial name
- Eriogonum exilifolium Reveal

= Eriogonum exilifolium =

Species of wild buckwheat

Eriogonum exilifolium is a species of flowering plant in the buckwheat family known by the common name dropleaf buckwheat. It is native to Wyoming and Colorado in the United States.

This species is a mat-forming herb growing up to about 10 centimeters tall. The leaves, located around the base of the plant, are linear or lance-shaped and measure up to 6 centimeters long. They are white and woolly on the undersides but green and mostly hairless on the upper surfaces. The inflorescence is a cluster of white flowers. This species was long confused with Eriogonum pauciflorum, a more common species, and it got its own name in 1967. It is closely related to Eriogonum coloradense.

This species grows in dry basins on hills and plains that are mostly free of other vegetation. Sometimes it grows in sagebrush. It grows on a number of soil types. It can be found growing alongside the endangered species Phacelia formosula.

== Taxonomy ==
Eriogonum exilifolium was scientifically described by James L. Reveal in 1967 as a member of the Eriogonum genus. It is classified in the Polygonaceae and has no synonyms.
