= Art Pope =

American politician (born 1956)

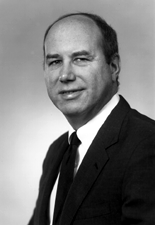

Budget Director of North Carolina
- In office January 6, 2013 – September 2014
- Governor: Pat McCrory
- Preceded by: Charlie Perusse
- Succeeded by: Lee Roberts

Member of the North Carolina House of Representatives from the 61st district
- In office April 13, 1999 – January 1, 2003
- Preceded by: Chuck Neely
- Succeeded by: Don Munford (Redistricting)
- In office January 1, 1989 – January 1, 1993
- Preceded by: Casper Holroyd
- Succeeded by: Brad Miller

Personal details
- Born: James Arthur Pope; May 5, 1956 (age 70) Fayetteville, North Carolina, U.S.
- Party: Republican
- Spouse: Katherine
- Children: 3
- Education: University of North Carolina, Chapel Hill (BA); Duke University (JD)
- Occupation: Businessman, attorney, philanthropist

James Arthur Pope (born May 5, 1956) is an American businessman, philanthropist, attorney and former government official. Pope is the owner, chairman and CEO of Variety Wholesalers, a group of 370 retail stores in 16 states. He is also the president and chairman of the John William Pope Foundation. He previously served in the North Carolina House of Representatives and served as the Budget Director for North Carolina Governor Pat McCrory.

He founded the American conservative North Carolina think tank the Civitas Institute and co-founded the John Locke Foundation and the James G. Martin Center for Academic Renewal. Pope's family foundations contributed millions of dollars to conservative causes, both nationally and in his home state.

== Early life and education ==
Pope was born May 5, 1956, in Fayetteville, North Carolina, to John W. and Joyce Wilkins Pope. He spent his early childhood in the town of Fuquay-Varina, North Carolina. He moved with his family to the capital city of Raleigh, North Carolina, in the early 1960s. Pope graduated from the University of North Carolina at Chapel Hill in 1978 with a B.A. with honors in political science and went on to earn his J.D. from the Duke University School of Law in 1981.

== Business and professional career ==
Pope is the chairman and president of Variety Wholesalers since 2006. Variety owns and operates 370 stores under the names Roses, Roses Express, Maxway, and Super 10, in sixteen states. Sales for Variety Wholesalers, Inc., a privately held company, are estimated to be at least $700 million and up to $1 billion. In 2025, Variety Wholesalers, Inc. acquired and re-opened an additional 219 Big Lots stores, as part of an asset purchase from the Big Lots bankruptcy. The company headquarters is located in Henderson, North Carolina, with a distribution center in Henderson. Pope first joined Variety Wholesaler in 1986.

Before entering business, Pope was an associate attorney with the firm of Skvarla, Boles, Wyrick and From in Raleigh, from 1982 through 1984. In 1984, Pope took a leave of absence from the firm to work as the director of organization for the North Carolina gubernatorial campaign of Jim Martin. Pope served as special counsel to Governor Jim Martin in 1985. Governor Pat McCrory appointed Art Pope State Budget Director in 2013. Pope served as State Budget Director from 2013 to 2014, and then stepped down to return to the private sector.

Pope is chairman and president of the John William Pope Foundation, which he founded with his father, John W. Pope, in 1986. The foundation has donated to Campbell University, the University of North Carolina at Chapel Hill, the John Locke Foundation (for which Pope was the founding chairman), The Heritage Foundation, the Cato Institute, and other organizations. From 1986 to 2024, the foundation has given more than $244 million in grants. In 2017, Art Pope became chairman of the Bradley Foundation, a conservative charitable organization.

== Politics and public service ==
Pope has been active with the Republican Party since the late 1970s, serving in a variety of roles ranging from precinct chairman to chairman of the North Carolina GOP State Convention. Pope has also served as a delegate to the Republican National Convention on three occasions. Pope was appointed to serve on the North Carolina State Goals and Policy Board from 1985 to 1989. He also served on the North Carolina Capital Planning Commission.

Pope was first elected to the North Carolina House of Representatives in 1988 to represent House District 61. He served four complete or partial terms in office, winning elections in 1988 and 1990, being appointed to fill a vacancy in 1999, and winning another election in 2000. He was elected Republican Joint Caucus Leader during the 1991–1992 session. Pope was awarded the Order of the Long Leaf Pine, the state's most prestigious award for public service, in 1992 at age 36.

Pope vacated his House seat to run for the office of Lieutenant Governor in 1992. After winning a three-way Republican primary in May 1992, Pope lost the general election to Democrat Dennis Wicker. In June 2011, Pope was appointed to the board of directors for Golden LEAF (Long-term Economic Advancement Foundation), a nonprofit grant-making organization whose mission is to spur economic development in tobacco-dependent areas of North Carolina. Pope had previously criticized some Golden LEAF funding decisions.

Pope was among several business leaders appointed in September 2012 to serve on a UNC system advisory group tasked with helping to shape the future of the state's public universities. Pope was also a member of the Electoral College in 2012, casting one of North Carolina's electoral votes for Mitt Romney. In November 2012, it was announced that Pope would serve as a co-chair on North Carolina Governor-Elect Pat McCrory's transition team, and in December he was announced as the state's chief budget director in the McCrory administration. In October 2016, Governor McCrory appointed Pope, along with former Democratic Governor Beverly Perdue, to serve on a bipartisan committee to evaluate and recommend relief and recovery measures from Hurricane Matthew.

On June 25, 2020, the North Carolina Senate elected Art Pope to the University of North Carolina Board of Governors, by a vote of 32-15, for a term beginning July 1, 2020. All Republicans voted for Pope, as well as some Democrats, including the Democratic Senate Minority Leader, Senator Dan Blue.

== Funding and activism for conservative causes ==
In 1975, as a University of North Carolina at Chapel Hill freshman, Pope filed a complaint under the code of student conduct against Algenon L. Marbley, President of the Black Student Movement, for shouting down David Duke of the Ku Klux Klan during a campus speech. Pope explained that while he condemned the Klan and thought it was a horrible organization, he was defending free speech for everyone. Pope co-founded the Libertarian Party of North Carolina as a college student in 1976.

According to the News and Observer, Pope "has invested millions in a network of foundations and think tanks, and advocacy groups, both in North Carolina and nationally, that are designed to further conservative and free market ideas." In 2005, Pope was a founding member of the NC Coalition for Lobbying & Government Reform. He joined former Democratic state Senator Wib Gulley from Durham, North Carolina, in calling for reform of the state's lobbying laws.

Pope has been a long-time supporter of legislation to establish an independent nonpartisan redistricting commission. In 2019, Pope spoke on behalf of a bipartisan coalition to support a constitutional amendment, sponsored by both Republican and Democratic legislators, to end gerrymandering in North Carolina. He has advocated doing away with the public financing of judicial elections in North Carolina. As an alternative to the election of judges, Pope stated he supported the appointment of judges by the governor with confirmation by the state legislature.

In 2025, Pope expressed strong opposition to tariffs in the second Trump administration, saying they would increase the cost of living and that they would be "one of the largest tax increases we have ever had in America."

North Carolina House of Representatives
Preceded by Casper Holroyd	Member of the North Carolina House of Representatives from the 61st district 1989–1993	Succeeded by Brad Miller
Preceded by Chuck Neely	Member of the North Carolina House of Representatives from the 61st district 1999–2003	Succeeded by Steve Wood
Party political offices
Preceded by Jim Gardner	Republican nominee for Lieutenant Governor of North Carolina; 1992	Succeeded by Steve Arnold
