= North Point (disambiguation) =

North Point is a mixed-use urban area on the north of Hong Kong Island.

North Point may also refer to:

== Places ==
=== United States ===
- Carnegie Camp North Point, a camp in New York
- North Point, former name of Cohasset, California
- North Point, Maryland
- North Point, Missouri, original name of Mound City, Missouri
- North Point State Park, a state park in Edgemere, Maryland
- North Point, St. Louis, Missouri
- North Point Community Church, a megachurch located in Alpharetta, Georgia
- North Point Park (Van Buren County, Michigan), a conservation area in Michigan
- North Point Park (Massachusetts), a park in Boston and Cambridge, Massachusetts
- North Point (Cambridge, Massachusetts), the redevelopment of old rail yard land in East Cambridge, Massachusetts
- North Point High School, in Waldorf, Maryland
- North Point Light, a lighthouse in Lake Park, Milwaukee, Wisconsin
- North Point Mall, a super-regional shopping mall in Alpharetta, Georgia
- North Point Office Building and Tower, a complex consisting of a skyscraper and an office building in Cleveland, Ohio
- Northway Mall (Anchorage, Alaska), rebranded in the 2020s as North Point.

=== Other places ===
- North Point, Newfoundland and Labrador, Canada
- North Point, Queensland, a point on Moreton Island, Queensland, Australia
- North Point, Signy Island, a point on Signy Island, South Orkney Islands, Antarctica
- St. Joseph's School, Darjeeling (commonly called North Point), in West Bengal, India

== Other uses ==
- "North Point" (1987), a song from Mike Oldfield's album Islands
- "North Point" (1974), an instrumental on BBC Radio 1971-1974 and Floating World Live by Soft Machine
- NP (novel) (short for "North Point"), a 1990 novel by Banana Yoshimoto
- Battle of North Point, a part of the Battle of Baltimore during the War of 1812
- North Point Press, an imprint of Farrar, Straus and Giroux

== See also ==
- Northpoint (disambiguation)
- North Point Park (disambiguation)
