= Chester Mall =

- Location: Chester, South Carolina, United States
- Coordinates: 34.699909°N 81.192398°W
- Opened: March 1973
- Closed: January 1994
- Developer: L&C Development Corp.
- Num. of anchor tenants: 4
- Floor area: 108,000 sq ft (10,000 m^{2})
- Floors: 1

Chester Mall was a regional shopping mall located in Chester County, South Carolina. The mall was anchored by Belk-Hudson, Roses, Winn Dixie and Eckerd Drug.

== History ==
=== 1970's ===
Chester Mall was built by L&C Development Corp based in Lancaster, South Carolina. The land for the mall was located on the S.C 72 Bypass, and was bought by L&C Development Corp from its parent L&C Railroad for $25,000. The mall, costing roughly $2 million, would have room for 18 shops and be 108,000 square feet.

The mall opened its doors in March 1973, with anchor stores Roses, Belk-Hudson, Winn Dixie and Eckerd Drug. Belk-Hudson, which had been operating a store in downtown Chester, South Carolina for 76 years, would close on January 26, 1973, due to the opening of the mall store.

Just two years after opening in 1975, the mall was not doing as well as projected. It is stated that a third of the stores were still vacant, and the stores that were there saw a 50% reduction in sales compared to other locations. Reasons for the mall's slow success was attributed to the economy and residents of Chester during this time staying loyal to the downtown shopping district.

=== 1980s ===
In February 1981, the mall sold to a Philadelphia based group known as Sovereign Reality 1980-I for a total of over $1.1 million. It is stated the mall only had one vacancy during the sale.

In 1985, two stores opened at the Chester Mall. All That's Music, which sold records, tapes and t-shirts. The other was known as Carolina Jeans, carrying name brand jeans, sweaters and accessories.

=== 1990s ===
In September 1992, it was announced that Eckerd Drug would leave the Chester Mall by October. The stated reason was lack of customer demand and an expiring lease.

Following Eckerd's departure, on January 6, 1993, Belk would close its doors. They were the last merchant in the mall, following Roses, Eckerd, and several local businesses leaving. This left the mall vacant.

== Kirby Auto Mall ==
In January 1994, it was announced that an automobile dealership known as Kirby Chevrolet-Buick-Pontiac-Oldsmobile would be moving into the mall. Construction costs for the renovations would total $200,000, and take five weeks to complete. Ralph Kirby, the owner of the dealership, signed a lease to initially occupy the 72,000 square foot former Belk location and a hallway of the mall, with the option to expand into the other mall areas later. The hallway included an area with planters, and it was stated that "People will pull their cars into a garden area," for servicing.

=== 2000s ===
In November 2004, it was announced that the Kirby Auto Mall would relocate from the former Chester Mall, leaving the now 120,000 square foot location empty once again. The property would be handled by Liz Odum Realty, who was asking $2 million for the property during this time.

=== 2010s ===
In July 2011, Walmart announced plans to build a supercenter at the site of the old Kirby Auto Mall. The grand opening was set for July 2012, and would involve the demolition of the old mall.
