= Harry Welchonce =

American baseball player (1883–1977)

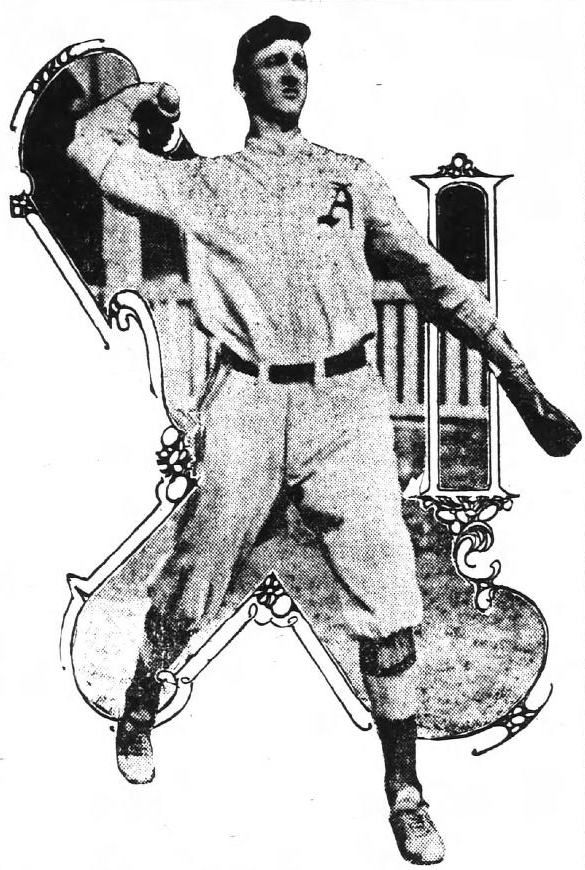
- Welchonce as a member of the Atlanta Crackers, c. 1913
- Outfielder
- Born: November 20, 1883; North Point, Pennsylvania, U.S.
- Died: February 26, 1977 (aged 93); Arcadia, California, U.S.
- Batted: Left Threw: Right

MLB debut
- April 17, 1911, for the Philadelphia Phillies

Last MLB appearance
- June 10, 1911, for the Philadelphia Phillies

MLB statistics
- Batting average: .212
- Hits: 14
- Runs batted in: 6
- Stats at Baseball Reference

Teams
- Philadelphia Phillies (1911)

Harry Monroe "Welch" Welchonce (November 20, 1883 – February 26, 1977) was an American Major League Baseball outfielder. Welchonce played for the Philadelphia Phillies in 1911. In 26 games, Welchonce had 14 hits in 66 at-bats, with a .212 batting average. He batted left and threw right-handed. In 1916, he was the player/manager of the Dallas Giants in the Texas League.

Welchonce was born in North Point, Pennsylvania and died in Arcadia, California.
