= JLF =

JLF may refer to:

- Jaipur Literature Festival, an annual literary festival
- John Locke Foundation, a conservative think tank based in North Carolina
