= Northpark Mall =

Northpark Mall, NorthPark Mall, or North Park Mall may refer to:

- NorthPark Mall (Iowa) in Davenport, Iowa
- Northpark Mall (Mississippi) in Jackson, Mississippi
- Northpark Mall (Missouri) in Joplin, Missouri
- NorthPark Mall (Oklahoma) in Oklahoma City, Oklahoma
- NorthPark Mall (Charlotte, North Carolina) in Charlotte, North Carolina
- North Park Mall, a defunct mall in Villa Park, Illinois
- North Park Mall, a defunct mall in El Paso, Texas
- NorthPark Center in Dallas, Texas

== See also ==
- Five Points Mall in Marion, Indiana, formerly known as North Park Mall
