= Northpoint =

Northpoint or Northpointe may refer to:

- North, a cardinal direction
- Northpoint, Pennsylvania, a community
- Northpoint City, a Singapore shopping mall
- NorthPoint Communications, now a part of AT&T
- Northpoint Technology
- Northpoint Training Center, a prison in Kentucky
- The original name of North Point (Cambridge, Massachusetts)
- NorthPointe Christian Schools, a school in Grand Rapids, Michigan

== See also ==
- North Point (disambiguation)
