= John William Pope Foundation =

American private charitable foundation

- Formation: June 18, 1986; 40 years ago
- Type: 501(c)(3) organization
- Tax ID no.: 58-1691765
- Location: Raleigh, North Carolina
- Vice president: David Riggs
- Chairman: Art Pope
- Revenue: $13.9 million (2024)
- Expenses: $16.1 million (2024)
- Website: jwpf.org

The John William Pope Foundation is a non-profit 501(c)(3) private charitable foundation based in Raleigh, North Carolina, that contributes to conservative public policy organizations and think tanks, educational institutions, humanitarian charities, and the arts. Art Pope, a businessman and philanthropist, is the current president and chairman of the board of directors.

The Pope Foundation "has invested millions in a network of foundations and think tanks, and advocacy groups, both in North Carolina and nationally, that are designed to further conservative and free market ideas", including the John Locke Foundation, James G. Martin Center for Academic Renewal, Americans for Prosperity, and North Carolina Institute for Constitutional Law.

== History ==
John William Pope, founder of the retail discount chain Variety Wholesalers, created the Pope Foundation in 1986.

The Pope Foundation celebrated its 25th anniversary in December 2011 by hosting a fundraiser for StepUp Ministry, a nonprofit that assists low-income individuals in getting a job and achieving a stable lifestyle. The ministry gained $300,000 from the Pope Foundation dinner.

== Philanthropy ==
In the 2011–2012 fiscal year, the John William Pope Foundation made over $9.3 million in grants, of which 60% went to support North Carolina public policy organizations, 28% went to support educational causes, 7% went to support national public policy organizations, 4% went to support humanitarian organizations, and 1% went to support the arts.

The Pope Foundation also underwrites scholarships for Eagle Scouts to attend college. Since the first class of scholars in 2001, the Pope Foundation has invested over $1 million in Scouts who plan to pursue careers in the free-enterprise system.

The Pope Foundation also has invested heavily in capital construction projects for area universities, including $3 million to UNC-Chapel Hill for the renovation of Kenan Memorial Stadium; $4.5 million for a convocation center at Campbell University; and $1.2 million to finish renovations on Campbell University's law school – Norman Adrian Wiggins School of Law.

In December 2012, the Pope Foundation announced $810,500 in grants to community charities, schools, churches, and the arts. To counter the effects of the federal government shutdown in October 2013, the Pope Foundation gave $185,000 in grants to "13 food bank-type groups" in central, eastern, and western North Carolina., including three charities in Vance County. The Pope Foundation gave a total of over $1 million to humanitarian and arts nonprofits in 2013.
