= David Riggs =

American academic

- Education: University of North Carolina at Wilmington; Clemson University
- Occupations: Vice president of philanthropic strategy at Philanthropy Roundtable, former vice president of John William Pope Foundation

David Riggs is the vice president of philanthropic strategy at Philanthropy Roundtable. He is the former vice president of the John William Pope Foundation.

== Education ==
Riggs earned his bachelor's degree at the University of North Carolina at Wilmington. He received his PhD in economics at Clemson University.

== Career ==
Riggs has worked as an environmental program officer at the Charles Koch Foundation. He has served as a senior fellow at the Capital Research Center, Competitive Enterprise Institute, and the Center of the American Experiment. He served as vice president of the John William Pope Foundation prior to joining Philanthropy Roundtable. He is a board member at the Martin Center.
