= Jane S. Shaw =

American environmentalist

Jane S. Shaw (also Jane Shaw Stroup) is an American free-market environmentalist, editor, and journalist. She is the former president of the James G. Martin Center for Academic Renewal and currently is chairman of its board of directors. She is a free-lance editor and manages two blogs, Janetakesonhistory.org. and libertyandecology.org.

Before joining the Martin Center (formerly the John W. Pope Center for Higher Education Policy), Shaw spent 22 years with the Property and Environment Research Center (PERC), where she was a senior fellow. Prior to her tenure at PERC, she was a journalist and was an associate economics editor of Business Week. With Michael Sanera, she coauthored Facts, Not Fear: Teaching Children about the Environment and initiated a book series for young people, Critical Thinking about Environmental Issues. She coedited A Guide to Smart Growth with Ronald Utt. She also served as president of the Association of Private Enterprise Education.

Shaw served as trustee of the Philadelphia Society from 1999 to 2002 and 2012 to 2015. Shaw is a senior editor with the journal Political Economy of the Carolinas, a member of the advisory council of the London-based Institute of Economic Affairs and of the Board of Visitors of Ralston College, an editorial advisor to the online journal Econ Journal Watch, and a member of the editorial advisory board of Regulation, a magazine relating to public policy published by the Cato Institute.

She was married to the late economist Richard Stroup.
