= Civitas Institute =

Conservative think tank

John William Pope Civitas Institute
- Abbreviation: Civitas
- Merged into: John Locke Foundation
- Formation: 9 March 2005; 21 years ago
- Founder: Art Pope
- Type: 501(c)(3) nonprofit
- Tax ID no.: 20-2454741
- Headquarters: Raleigh, North Carolina, U.S.
- Region served: North Carolina
- Methods: Public policy think tank
- Website: www.nccivitas.org

The Civitas Institute, Inc. (Civitas) was a Raleigh, North Carolina–based conservative think tank. In January 2021, Civitas merged with the John Locke Foundation.

== History ==
Civitas was incorporated on March 9, 2005.

Initial members of the board of directors included the first president of the organization, R. Jack Hawke; businessman Robert Luddy; and Art Pope, a businessman, political figure and philanthropist. Pope resigned from the Civitas board in December 2012 to serve as Deputy Budget Director in the administration of Governor Pat McCrory.

The organization's name honored Art Pope's father, John William Pope, also a businessman and conservative philanthropist.

== Activities and advocacy ==
In late 2012, Civitas commissioned a study on the effects of lowering or eliminating state income taxes. In July 2013, the legislature passed and the governor signed into law lower corporate and personal income tax rates. The organization has also called for elimination of North Carolina's state corporate income tax.

A Civitas study of the State Board of Elections led Civitas to call on top state officials for an investigation of the board and its ties to a lobbyist.

In 2013, Civitas launched a website to attack the Affordable Care Act, portraying the health care reform legislation as an assault by elites against middle-class North Carolinians.

Civitas repeatedly sued the State of North Carolina over the same-day voter registration process, which Civitas opposed. A suit filed by Civitas seeking to halt the final count of votes in the 2016 North Carolina gubernatorial election was dismissed in December 2016, but the organization subsequently renewed its litigation.

Civitas commissioned live-caller opinion polling of North Carolina voters.

Civitas advocated for increased school choice for students in North Carolina.

== Events ==
The annual Conservative Leadership Conference offered conservative speakers and workshops on relevant issues. CLC speakers included Charles Krauthammer, Arthur C. Brooks, Rudy Giuliani, Fred Barnes, Stephen Moore, Elizabeth Dole, Michael Barone, Bob Novak, Grover Norquist, and others. The 2013 CLC featured speakers such as U.S. Senator Ron Johnson, Michelle Malkin, former U.S. Sen. Jim DeMint, former U.S. Rep. Artur Davis, U.S. Reps. Renee Ellmers and George Holding, talk-show host Jason Lewis, The Heritage Foundation's former president Edwin Feulner, and Lt. Gov. Dan Forest.

Civitas hosted a monthly lunch series to announce poll findings and offer commentary on issues.

== Publications ==
The Civitas Institute published a monthly newspaper, the Civitas Capitol Connection, an internet magazine, the Civitas Review and the Civitas Blog.

The Civitas Institute published a number of pieces online critical of the Moral Mondays protests. In one article, William Barber Rakes in Taxpayer Dollars Leads Moral (no it is) Money Mondays! the Civitas Institute criticized Rev. William Barber, head of the state's NAACP, because a non-profit overseen by Barber's church received federal support. Barber responded, stating "People know I'm a volunteer, even with the NAACP. Other work I do, I volunteer. I am a pastor."

The Civitas Institute also released a web page which compiles data on protestors arrested in the course of the civil disobedience actions, which includes demographic information and comments on their voter registration status.
