= Big Lots =

American discount retail company

Big Lots Stores, Inc.

- A line of customers at the Big Lots! grand opening in Farmington.
- Trade name: Big Lots
- Formerly: Consolidated Stores Corp. (1967–2000)
- Type: Private
- Traded as: OTCID Basic: BIGGQ (2024–present); NYSE: BIG (2006–2024); NYSE: BLI (until 2006)
- Industry: Retail
- Founded: December 13, 1967; 58 years ago, in Columbus, Ohio, U.S. (first incarnation, as Consolidated Stores Corp.); April 10, 2025; 19 months ago (second incarnation)
- Founder: Sol A. Shenk
- Fate: Acquired by Variety Wholesalers
- Headquarters: Columbus, Ohio, U.S.
- Number of locations: 217 (2026)
- Area served: Contiguous United States
- Products: Food and beverage, toys, furniture, clothing, housewares, small electronics
- Brands: biglots.com K·B Toys (1996–2000); Toy Liquidators (1994–2000)
- Revenue: ▲US$6.15 billion (2021)
- Operating income: ▲US$239.7 million (2021)
- Net income: ▲US$177.77 million (2021)
- Total assets: ▲US$1.41 billion (2021)
- Owner: Variety Wholesalers
- Number of employees: 22,900 (2018)
- Parent: Variety Wholesalers
- Divisions: Big Lots Wholesale
- Subsidiaries: LW Stores
- Website: www.biglots.com

Big Lots Stores, Inc. (stylized as Big Lots!) is an American discount retail chain, specializing in the sale of closeout and overstock merchandise. Founded in 1967 as Consolidated Stores, the chain is headquartered in Columbus, Ohio, and includes over 200 locations across the United States.

Big Lots filed for Chapter 11 bankruptcy in October 2024, and later in December, the chain announced that it would cease operations, liquidate, and close all remaining stores. Liquidation sales began in December 2024 and all stores were expected to close in 2025. On December 28, 2024, Big Lots reached an agreement with Gordon Brothers Retail Partners to transfer 200–400 stores and one or two distribution centers to Variety Wholesalers, with the remaining stores to be permanently closed.

== History ==
=== Early years ===
The first closeout store, Odd Lots, opened in 1982 in Columbus. Due to a naming conflict with Revco’s Odd Lot Trading Co., the company rebranded its stores outside of Ohio as Big & Small Lots, later consolidating all stores under the Big Lots name.

Consolidated Stores was also an investor in the DeLorean Motor Company and took possession of unsold vehicles after the automaker’s 1982 bankruptcy. The company went public in 1985 on the American Stock Exchange and switched to the New York Stock Exchange in 1986 under the symbol CNS.

During the 1990s, Consolidated acquired Toy Liquidators (1994) and KB Toys (1996), which it later sold to Bain Capital in 2000. In 1998, it purchased MacFrugals (Pic ‘N’ Save) for $995 million in stock. The company was renamed Big Lots, Inc. in 2001, changing its ticker symbol to BLI, and later to BIG in 2006. In 2005, it closed 170 stores, including all standalone furniture locations.

=== Big Lots Wholesale ===
Big Lots operated a wholesale division for over 34 years through Big Lots Wholesale, Consolidated International, and Wisconsin Toy. The division, which sold merchandise in bulk, was closed at the end of fiscal year 2013.

=== Big Lots Canada ===
In July 2011, Big Lots acquired Canadian closeout retailer Liquidation World Inc. for $20 million, marking its first expansion outside the United States. The first Canadian store opened in April 2013, with additional locations in Ontario. The company exited Canada in 2014 due to poor sales.

== Bankruptcy ==
Big Lots, formerly the largest close-out retailer in the United States, filed for Chapter 11 bankruptcy in September 2024. The filing followed several years of declining sales, increasing debt, and unsuccessful efforts to revive the business. The case is cited as an example of how economic pressures, changes in consumer behavior, COVID-induced supply chain shortages, and strategic missteps can contribute to the collapse of a long-standing retail chain.

Big Lots attributed its bankruptcy to persistent inflation and high interest rates, which it said had reduced spending by its core lower-income customers. However, court documents indicated that the company’s financial problems stemmed from a heavily leveraged balance sheet, including sale-leaseback agreements, rising logistics costs, and nine consecutive quarters of same-store sales declines. The Chapter 11 filing enabled the company to secure $707.5 million in debtor-in-possession (DIP) financing and propose a stalking-horse sale to Nexus Capital. After the deal fell through in December 2024, liquidation sales began at all 963 stores.

One of the key factors contributing to Big Lots’ financial decline was a sustained drop in revenue. The company’s annual revenue fell from $6.19 billion in 2020 to $4.51 billion on a trailing twelve-month basis in 2024, a decline of 27.1%. Comparable store sales decreased by 9.9% in the first quarter of 2024 and 8.6% in the fourth quarter of 2023, extending a streak of nine consecutive quarters of negative same-store sales.

On January 1, 2025, a U.S. bankruptcy court approved a sale agreement allowing Gordon Brothers Retail Partners to sell between 200 and 400 Big Lots stores, as well as distribution centers and intellectual property, to Variety Wholesalers Inc. The decision, approved by Judge Kate Stickles, faced objections from several vendors. Companies such as Tempur Sealy and Serta Simmons argued that the deal prioritized repayment to lenders while leaving trade creditors with substantial losses. They also alleged that Big Lots accrued approximately $250 million in vendor debt after becoming aware it would be unable to fully repay its obligations.

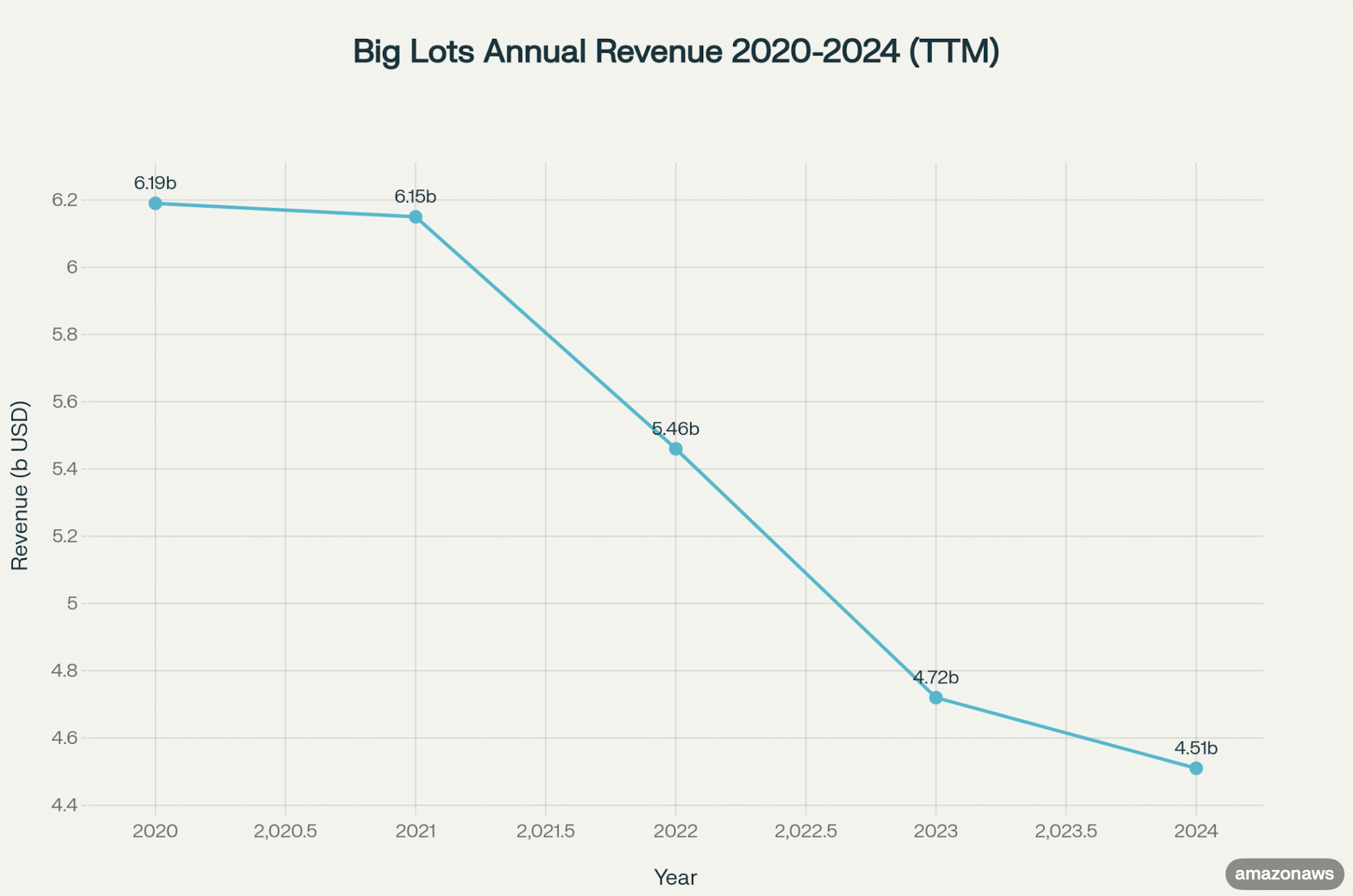
Big Lots revenue fell from $6.19B in 2020 to $4.51B in 2024.

On November 10, 2025, the former company, now doing business as Former BL Stores, Inc., converted their Chapter 11 case to a Chapter 7 bankruptcy liquidation.

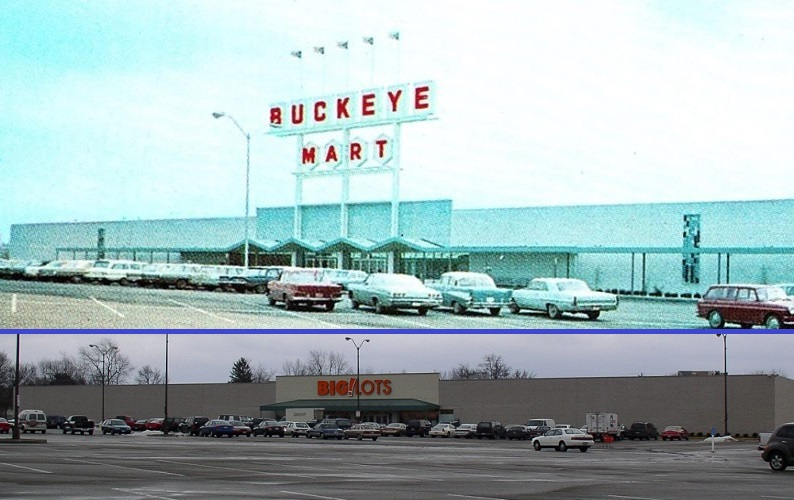
Big Lots Store No. 1 was in Berwick Plaza Shopping Center in Columbus, Ohio. The first store in the Big Lots chain was a former Kroger store in the same shopping center. The store later moved to the former Buckeye Mart/Sarco building on Winchester Pike.

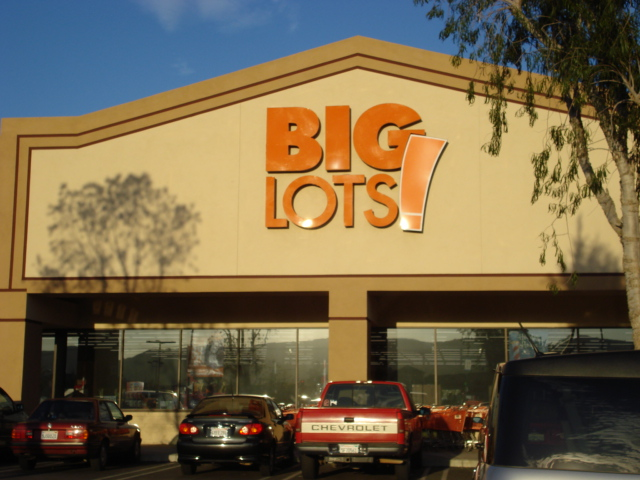
A Big Lots in Murrieta, California which was a former Pic 'N' Save

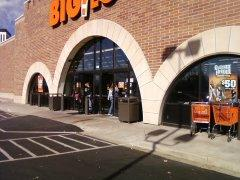
Entrance to a Big Lots in Englewood, Colorado (closed in 2023), which was a former Children's Palace

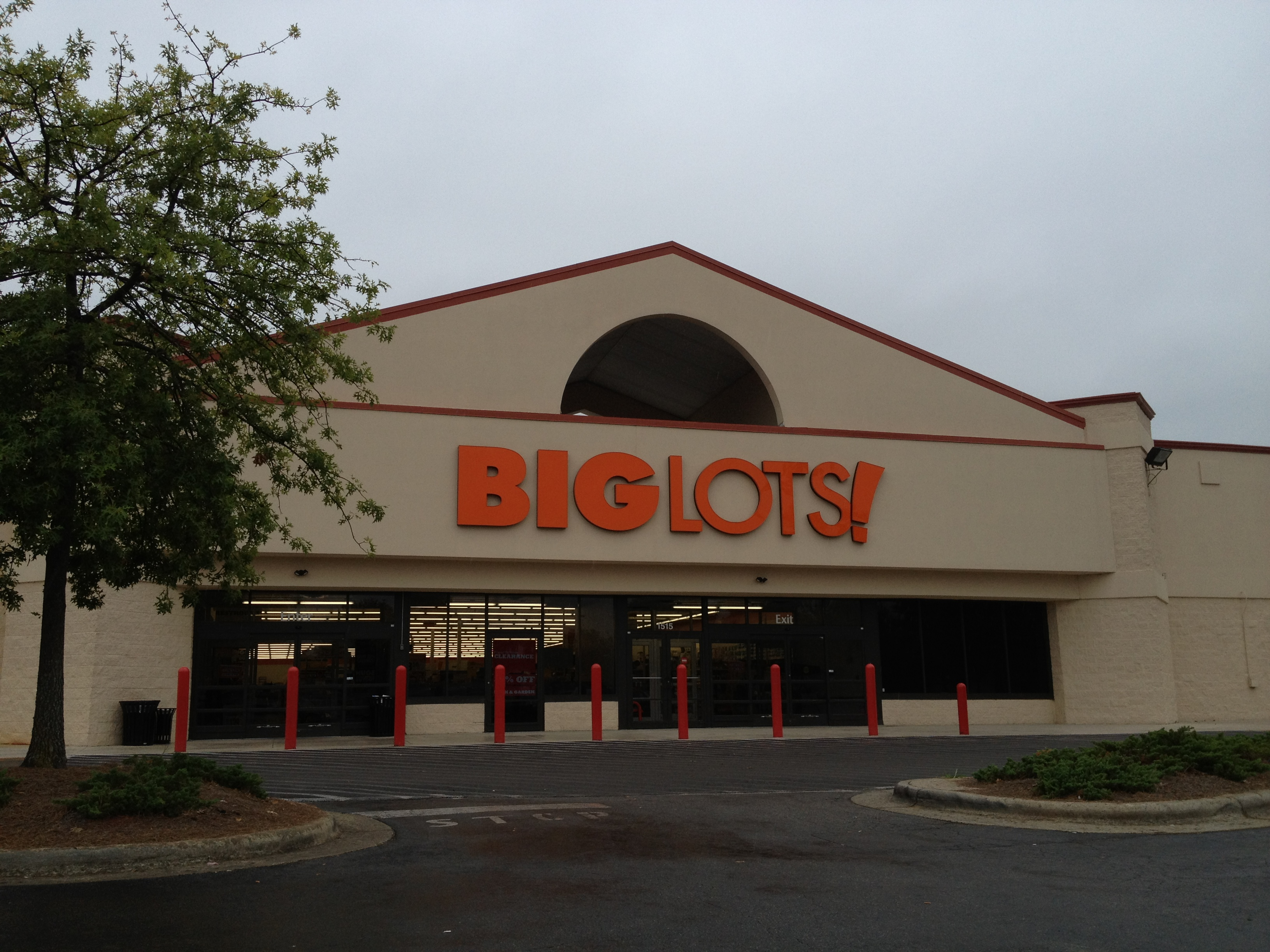
Big Lots in Raleigh, North Carolina (closed in 2024)

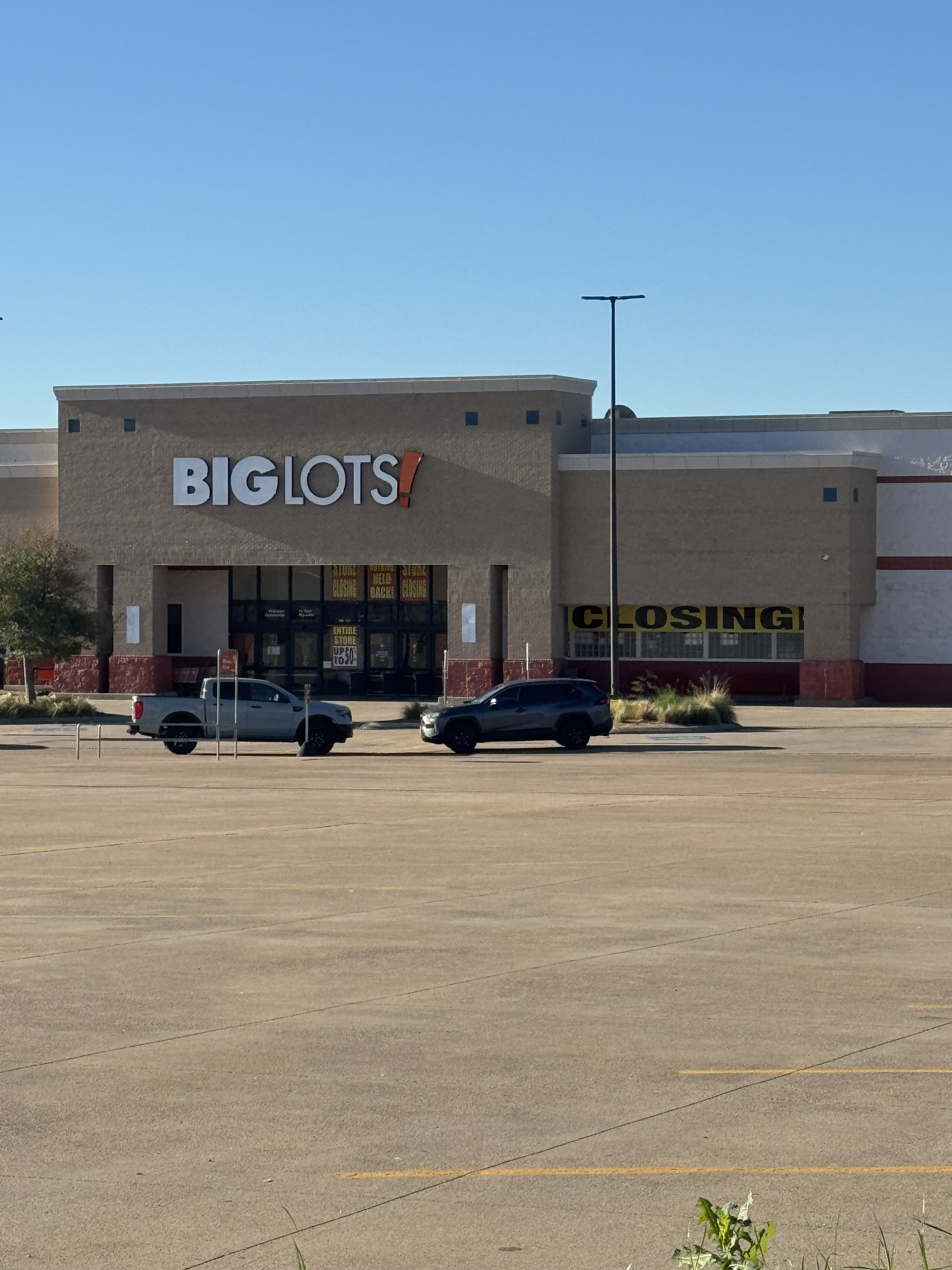
Closing Big Lots in Mansfield, Texas (November 2024)

== See also ==
- List of S&P 400 companies
