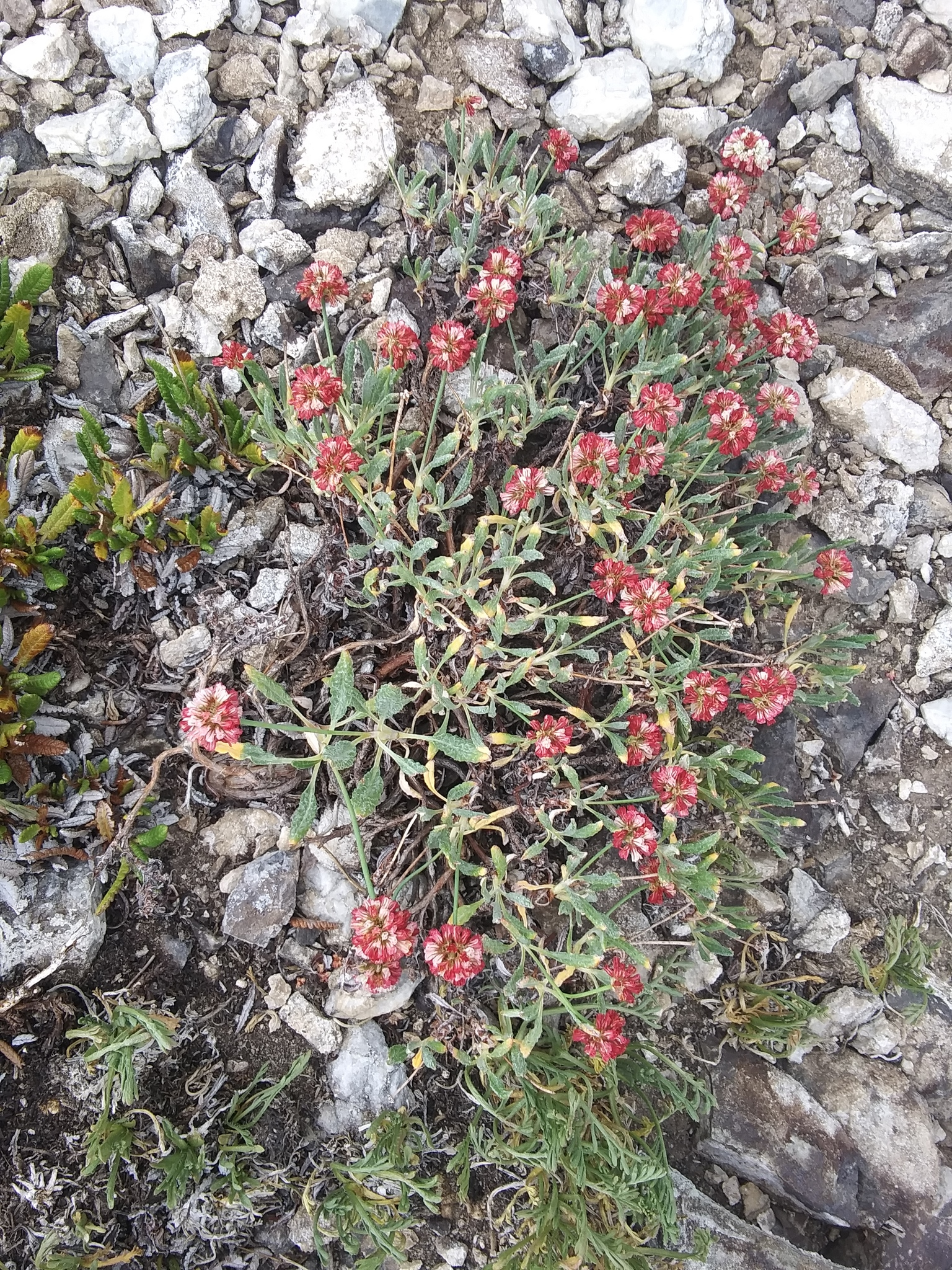

Conservation status
- Vulnerable (NatureServe)

Scientific classification
- Kingdom: Plantae
- Clade: Embryophytes
- Clade: Tracheophytes
- Clade: Angiosperms
- Clade: Eudicots
- Order: Caryophyllales
- Family: Polygonaceae
- Genus: Eriogonum
- Species: E. coloradense

Binomial name
- Eriogonum coloradense Small

Synonyms
- Eriogonum multiceps subsp. coloradense

= Eriogonum coloradense =

Species of wild buckwheat

Eriogonum coloradense is a species of flowering plant in the buckwheat family known by the common name Colorado buckwheat. It is endemic to Colorado in the United States.

This species is a mat-forming herb growing just a few centimeters tall. The leaves are located around the base of the plant. They are up to 4 or 5 centimeters long and are mostly green on top with woolly undersides. The inflorescences are borne atop flowering stems reaching up to about 10 centimeters tall. The inflorescence is a cluster of tiny white to pink flowers. This species is most closely related to Eriogonum lonchophyllum, and some authors, including Eriogonum expert James Reveal, suspect it may be a form of that species.

Most of the occurrences of this Colorado endemic plant are located in the vicinity of the Maroon Bells–Snowmass Wilderness. It has a "broad ecological range", occurring in many types of habitat. It occurs on a variety of soils, flat or sloping terrain, every aspect, and a number of landforms. It occurs in several plant communities and at a range of elevations. Considering its ability to live in a range of environmental conditions it is unclear why the plant is not more common.

The main threat to this species is recreational activity in its mountain habitat. It occurs at popular recreational sites near Crested Butte.

== Taxonomy ==
The botanist John Kunkel Small scientifically described this species in the Eriogonum genus in 1906, giving it the name Eriogonum coloradense. Susan Gabriella Stokes proposed making it a subspecies of Eriogonum multiceps in 1936, but this has not become the accepted classification. Together with its genus it is in the Polygonaceae family and has no other synonyms.
