= North Point Park =

North Point Park may refer to:

- North Point Park (Van Buren County, Michigan)
- North Point Park (Massachusetts)
- North Point State Park, Maryland
