= John Locke Foundation =

American conservative think tank

- Founded: 1990
- Founder: Art Pope
- Type: Think tank
- Tax ID no.: 56-1656943
- Location(s): 4800 Six Forks Rd., #220; Raleigh, NC 27609
- Region served: North Carolina
- Key people: Rodney C. Pitts, Chairman; Donald Bryson, CEO & President
- Budget: Revenue: $5.05 million Expenses: $5.57 million (FYE June 2024)
- Employees: 32
- Website: www.johnlocke.org

The John Locke Foundation (JLF) is a free-market think tank based in North Carolina. The organization was founded in 1990 to work "for truth, for freedom, and for the future of North Carolina." It is named after John Locke, a philosopher who was a primary contributor to classical liberalism. JLF was co-founded by Art Pope, a North Carolina businessman active in politics. Pope's family foundation provides most of the support for the center.

JLF advocates lowering taxes, and encouraging free markets. The organization's stated mission is to "employ research, journalism, and outreach programs to transform government through competition, innovation, personal freedom, and personal responsibility. JLF seeks a better balance between the public sector and private institutions of family, faith, community, and enterprise."

The group's president, Donald Bryson, wrote in 2023 that the foundation has become more concerned with national politics and growing threats from both the left and the right. The John William Pope Center for Higher Education Policy was in its initial stages a project of the John Locke Foundation.

== Activities ==
The John Locke Foundation's research staff regularly publishes scholarly articles and reports on topics such as budget and tax policy; regulatory, legal, and environmental policy; education policy; and county and local government, including transportation and land-use policies.

According to North Carolina's WRAL news, John Locke Foundation staff are frequently quoted in news outlets across the state and appear as guests on public affairs programs, and columns by foundation staff appear in local newspapers.

Every two years, JLF produces an agenda document that focuses on issues that JLF believes the North Carolina state government must address. The organization also publishes the Carolina Journal, a bi-monthly publication, as well as CarolinaJournal.com.

In January 2021, the Civitas Institute merged into the John Locke Foundation.

== See also ==
- John William Pope Foundation
- Libertarian conservatism
- Koch network
