= Variety Wholesalers =

American retail holding company

Variety Wholesalers, Inc.
- Type: Private
- Industry: Retail
- Founded: 1930 (96 years ago) in Henderson, North Carolina, U.S.
- Founder: John William Pope
- Headquarters: Henderson, North Carolina, U.S.
- Number of locations: 600 (2025)
- Key people: Art Pope, CEO
- Revenue: ▲US$1.5 billion (2021)
- Number of employees: ~ 7,000 (2021)
- Divisions: Big Lots; Roses; Super 10; Maxway
- Subsidiaries: Variety Stores, Inc.

Variety Wholesalers, Inc., is a privately held company based in Henderson, North Carolina, which owns more than 380 retail stores in the Southeast and Mid-Atlantic United States under the banners Roses, Maxway and Big Lots. The company employs more than 7,000 workers.

== History ==
It originated in 1930 as a small group of retail stores owned by the Pope family. In 1949, John William Pope took over the family business, and starting in 1970, the company expanded by purchasing a number of other retail chains, including the Roses and Maxway stores, to become one of the largest in the US.

In December 2024, Variety Wholesalers reached a deal to buy at least 200 stores and two distribution centers from the bankrupt Ohio-based discount store Big Lots and continue to operate them under the Big Lots name.

The company is still privately owned by the Pope family, and its current CEO is Art Pope.

== Organization ==
The Company has three main divisions:

Maxway stores, which consists of 135 stores in the "junior department store" competitive market. The size of these stores range from 10,000 square feet to 30,000 square feet, and operate under the Maxway and Roses Express banners.

Super 10 consists of 85 stores. Their size ranges from 5,000 to 10,000 square feet. These stores operate under the names "Super Dollar," "Bill's Dollar Stores," "Super 10", and "Bargain Town".

The Roses division has 160 locations and is competitive with "discount" and "off-price" stores. These range in size from 30,000 square feet to 70,000 square feet.

The Big Lots division has 218 stores across the East Coast and into the Midwest. These stores range in size from 30,000 to 50,000 square feet and specialize in housewares, clothing, toys, electronics, and shelf stable consumables.
