= James G. Martin Center for Academic Renewal =

American conservative think tank (2003-)

Coordinates: 35.8208°N 78.6260°W

- Named after: Gov. James G. Martin
- Formation: 2003
- Type: 501(c)(3) organization
- Tax ID no.: 16-1686283
- Purpose: Higher education policy
- Location: Raleigh, North Carolina
- Methods: Public policy
- President: Jenna Ashley Robinson
- Revenue: $748,775 (2024)
- Expenses: $724,475 (2024)
- Website: https://jamesgmartin.center/
- Formerly called: Pope Center for Higher Education Policy

The James G. Martin Center for Academic Renewal, formerly known as the Pope Center for Higher Education Policy and simply the Pope Center, is an American conservative 501(c)(3) nonprofit higher education policy institute located in Raleigh, North Carolina.

The Martin Center is one of several public policy centers underwritten by the John William Pope Foundation.

The Martin Center changed its name in January 2017 and is named after former North Carolina Governor James G. Martin. The Martin Center has attained the GuideStar Exchange Gold participation level, a symbol of transparency and accountability.

== History and organization ==
The Martin Center originated in 1996 as a project of the John Locke Foundation (also founded by Art Pope), a nonprofit think tank concerned especially with free markets, limited constitutional government, and personal responsibility. In 2003, the then-Pope Center was incorporated as a separate entity.

The president of the Martin Center is Jenna Ashley Robinson. The previous president was Jane S. Shaw, who retired in February 2015.

== Activities ==
The Martin Center describes its role as a "watchdog" with respect to higher education in the United States in general and the public system in North Carolina in particular. The Martin Center makes available on its website many of the research and policy papers authored by its staff, including reports on campus speech codes, faculty teaching loads, general education programs, and privately funded university academic centers.

The Martin Center's commentaries and research papers have called for budget cuts to the UNC system and for increasing faculty teaching loads and eliminating teaching reductions for administrators. The center's director of research, George Leef, has argued for cuts in funding for the university system generally, and to eliminate the public subsidies for the state's scholarly press (the University of North Carolina Press), terming it a "boondoggle". In its broadest aim, the center has argued for "renewal of the university", advocating the creation of privately funded academic centers, which, in their view, would offer balance to academic courses. Their strongest opposition campaign to date, conducted in conjunction with another Pope-funded think tank, the Civitas Institute, was directed against Gene Nichol, former president of the College of William and Mary and former dean of the UNC-Chapel Hill School of Law, in his role as the director of UNC Chapel-Hill's Center on Poverty, Work and Opportunity. The Pope Center accused Nichol of partisanship and financial opacity. In 2015, the UNC Board of Governors concluded that the center was unable to demonstrate any appreciable impact on poverty and did not enhance the educational mission of the university and voted to close the Poverty Center.

In 2021, the Martin Center opposed the UNC-Chapel Hill appointment of Nikole Hannah-Jones and recommended increased involvement from trustees in the hiring of faculty and tenure.

The work of the Martin Center and its staff has received praise and support from other conservative or libertarian organizations and publications with an interest in educational issues. The center has also been criticized by faculty in the North Carolina university system and from journalists and commentators outside the sector.

In 2025, the Martin Center promoted model legislative language while advocating with state-created alternatives to traditional higher-education accreditation while the UNC System was considering creating a new accrediting agency. The Center also took part in the 2025 UNC System syllabus transparency debate, together with the Heritage Foundation and the Oversight Project.

== Board of directors ==
As of 2021, the organization's board of directors includes Arch T. Allen, Nan Miller, J. Edgar Broyhill, Virginia Foxx, John M. Hood, Burley Mitchell, James G. Martin, David Riggs, Jane S. Shaw, Robert L. Shibley, and Garland S. Tucker III.
