= The Shoppes at Northpark =

- Location: Oklahoma City, Oklahoma, United States
- Coordinates: 35.5931°N 97.5658°W
- Opened: 1972
- Owner: Morris Enterprises, Inc.
- Num. of stores: 35
- Floor area: 250,000 sq ft (23,000 m^{2})
- Floors: 1
- Website: northparkokc.com

The Shoppes at Northpark is a shopping mall located in Oklahoma City, Oklahoma, with a concentration of high-end retail establishments. It contains 45 tenants comprising approximately 250,000 square feet of gross space for lease.

Thomas Morris purchased a 22-acre (89,000 m^{2}) tract for the mall in 1967 at $2,500-an-acre, and completed the first phase in 1973, which consisted of a 26,000 sq ft (2,400 m^{2}) Safeway grocery store (the largest in the state at the time, no longer in business) and Northpark 4 Cinemas, becoming AMC Northpark 7 in its final form before being closed. In 1973, the new mall was located on (what was at that time) the northern edge of Oklahoma City.

It was followed by an expansion in 1977 which added 140,000 sq ft (13,000 m^{2}) of retail space; the mall expanded again in 1981. Occupancy fell to approximately 50 percent as a result of the 1980s oil bust, but subsequently improved in the mid-1990s. The mall now consists of a number of smaller high-end retailers.
