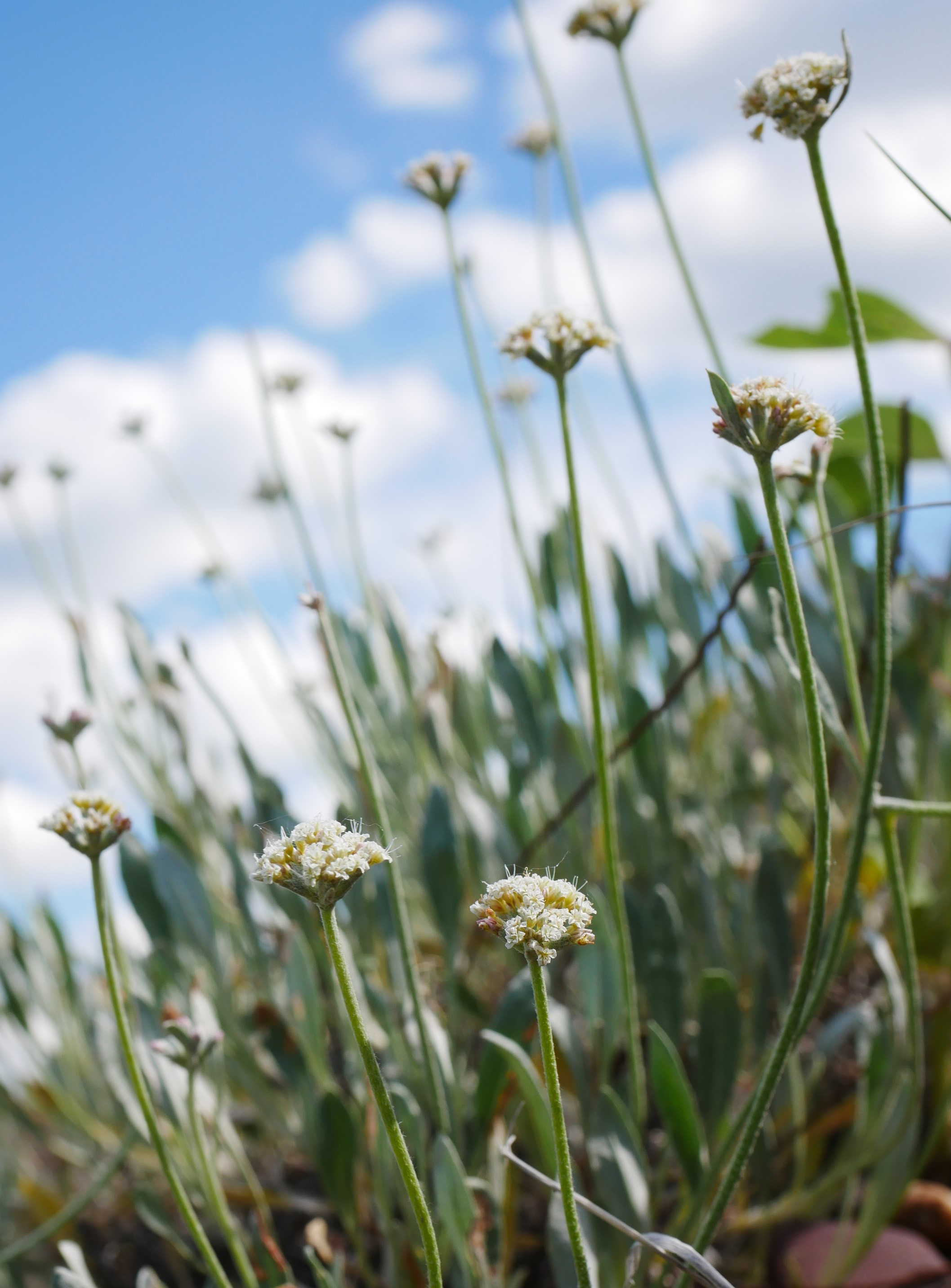

Conservation status
- Secure (NatureServe)

Scientific classification
- Kingdom: Plantae
- Clade: Embryophytes
- Clade: Tracheophytes
- Clade: Angiosperms
- Clade: Eudicots
- Order: Caryophyllales
- Family: Polygonaceae
- Genus: Eriogonum
- Species: E. pauciflorum

Binomial name
- Eriogonum pauciflorum Pursh

Synonyms
- Eriogonum depauperatum; Eriogonum dioicum; Eriogonum gnaphalodes; Eriogonum multiceps; Eriogonum parviflorum

= Eriogonum pauciflorum =

Species of wild buckwheat

Eriogonum pauciflorum is a common species of wild buckwheat on the Great Plains known by the common name few flowered buckwheat.

== Description ==
A short matted buckwheat with grey leaves, few flowered buckwheat occurs in southern Manitoba and Saskatchewan, northeastern Colorado, Montana, western Nebraska, North Dakota, Nebraska, South Dakota, and Wyoming.

== Taxonomy ==
Eriogonum pauciflorum was scientifically described and named by Frederick Traugott Pursh in 1813. It is classified in the genus Eriogonum within the family Polygonaceae. It has no accepted varieties and has seven heterotypic synonyms according to Plants of the World Online.

Table of Synonyms
Name	Year	Rank	Notes
Eriogonum depauperatum Small	1898	species	
Eriogonum dioicum Raf.	1838	species	
Eriogonum gnaphalodes Benth.	1853	species	
Eriogonum multiceps Nees	1841	species	
Eriogonum multiceps subsp. typicum S.Stokes	1936	subspecies	not validly publ.
Eriogonum parviflorum Nutt.	1818	species	
Eriogonum pauciflorum var. gnaphalodes (Benth.) Reveal	1967	variety	
