= North Point Park (Van Buren County, Michigan) =

Conservation area

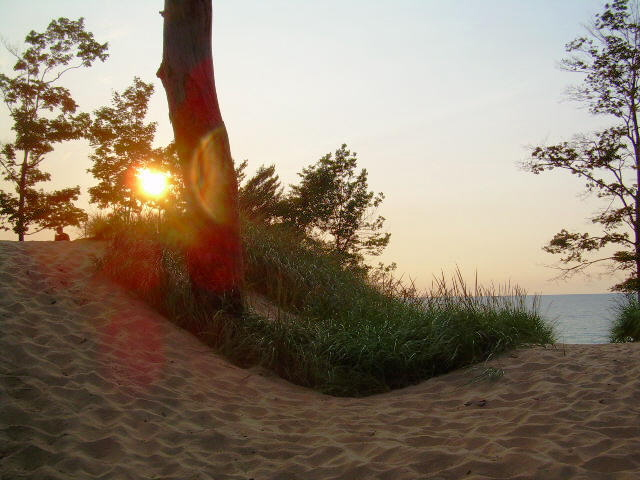
- Dune overlooking Lake Michigan at North Point Park

- Location within Michigan
- Location: Van Buren County, Michigan, USA
- Nearest city: South Haven, Michigan
- Coordinates: 42°20′35″N 86°18′00″W
- Area: 17 acres (6.9 ha)
- Governing body: Van Buren County, Michigan

North Point Park, also known as North Point Conservation Area, is located in the southwestern portion of the U.S. state of Michigan, along the shore of Lake Michigan. The park is owned by Van Buren County, Michigan and includes about 17 acres (6.9 ha) of public land situated on the Lake Michigan shore. The park is adjacent to, and due North of, the Van Buren State Park (Michigan). Public access to the conservation area is gained via an entrance and parking area on Ruggles Road (off of Blue Star Highway).

North Point Park has 330 feet (100 m) of scenic Lake Michigan beach, forested critical dunes, and wetlands. The Southwest Michigan Land Conservancy has a conservation easement on the property to protect it from future development.

The park boasts unmarked trails that meander through a climax maple / beech forest to the top of a sand dune where a panoramic view of Lake Michigan can be enjoyed. Many visitors access the area by boat and use the beach for summertime recreation. On a nice summer day, several boats are often anchored off the shore of North Point.

Lake Michigan and the Great Lakes are a natural wonder which contain more than 95% of North America's freshwater and are the largest readily available source of freshwater in the world. Less than one percent of the natural habitat near the shores of Lake Michigan is still intact.
