= Northpoint, Pennsylvania =

Unincorporated community in Pennsylvania, US

- Unincorporated community
- Location within Pennsylvania Location within the United States
- Coordinates: 40°54′13″N 79°07′53″W
- Country: United States
- State: Pennsylvania
- County: Indiana
- Township: West Mahoning
- Elevation: 1,175 ft (358 m)
- Time zone: UTC-5 (Eastern (EST))
  - Summer (DST): UTC-4 (EDT)
- ZIP code: 15763
- Area code: 814
- GNIS feature ID: 1199234

Northpoint (also known as North Point) is an unincorporated community in Indiana County, Pennsylvania, United States. The community is located in northwestern Indiana County, 3.1 miles (5.0 km) northeast of Smicksburg.
