= Roses (store) =

American chain of discount stores

- Type: Subsidiary
- Industry: Retail
- Genre: discount store
- Founded: 1915; 111 years ago
- Founder: Paul Howard Rose
- Headquarters: Henderson, North Carolina
- Number of locations: 175 (2021)
- Products: Food, drinks, snacks, toys, furniture, clothing, housewares, footwear, bedding, health & beauty, home décor, home improvement, electronics, pet supplies, outdoor & recreational equipment
- Parent: Variety Wholesalers
- Website: www.rosesdiscountstores.com

Former logo. This, as well as some other variations of the same logo is still used on some older locations

Roses Discount Stores (originally known as Rose's 5¢ 10¢ 25¢ Stores) is a regional discount store in the United States with its headquarters in Henderson, North Carolina. The chain has stores in fifteen states, primarily in the South.

Roses was purchased by Variety Wholesalers Inc. in 1997 and the company's Roses Division has approximately 175 stores which compete chiefly with Walmart and Target. In 2010, the Roses Division began expanding beyond its original base of stores in the South, opening stores in Pennsylvania, Ohio, and Indiana.

== History ==
=== Early years ===
Rose's Stores, Inc was founded in Henderson, North Carolina in 1915 by Paul Howard Rose (1880–1955). A merchant from his youth, Rose took possession of the Henderson store in June 1915 following dissolution of a partnership that had operated stores in Henderson and Charlotte. The chain expanded first in nearby Oxford (1916), then Roxboro (April 1917), Louisburg (March 1918) and in the Rosemary section of Roanoke Rapids (August 1918). With these five stores proving profitable, Rose and other family members began to expand into a wider area in 1920, first into South Carolina (Store No. 6, Mullins) and Virginia (Store No. 7, Franklin). Westward expansion began through North Carolina into Lenoir (Store No. 8), Statesville (Store No. 9) and elsewhere. When the chain incorporated in 1927, there were around 30 stores. Further expansion into Tennessee (Newport, No. 44, 1929) and Georgia (Dawson, No. 74, 1935) completed what would be the core of Roses' market area, which persists through to today.

Most stores were in small towns, but in 1938 the company began opening outlets in the Hampton Roads, Virginia, area, which would become its dominant urban market. Store 105 opened in 1938 on Colley Avenue in Norfolk, around the corner from where, three years later, the company would open a large department store, the PHR Center Shop, at the time Norfolk's most modern store. The following year, Store 106 (Ocean View Norfolk) and 107 (Downtown Virginia Beach) cemented the company's position in Hampton Roads. At the beginning of World War II, there were 118 Rose's 5-10-25 cent stores. During the conflict, housing boards in Norfolk and Portsmouth asked the company to open stores in government-owned neighborhood shopping clusters in housing areas created for war industry workers.

=== Expansion into shopping centers ===
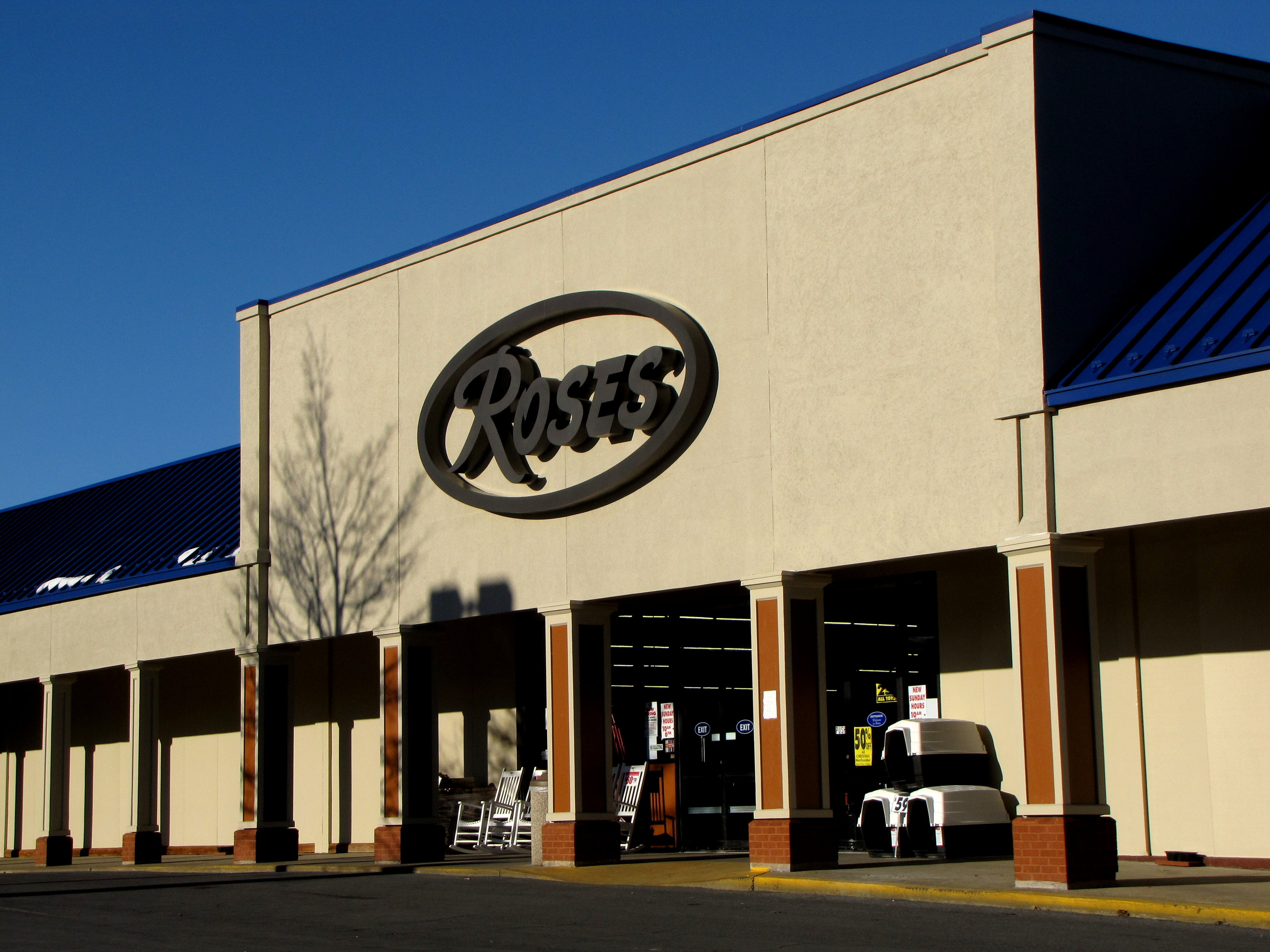
Roses store in a shopping center in Waynesboro, Virginia

Following the war, Roses' first real shopping center store opened in the Midtown Center at Wards Corner, also in Norfolk. Roses found the shopping center location successful and quickly went on to open stores in newly constructed centers throughout its marketing area. Early shopping center stores include No. 127 in Greenville, South Carolina's Lewis Plaza; No. 130 in Raleigh's Cameron Village; No. 132 in Greensboro's Summit Center, and No. 135 in Jacksonville, North Carolina's New River Plaza. Each of these stores was larger than the previous, leading the company in the direction it would take in the 1960s. When a shopping center location opened in Spartanburg's Pinewood Plaza in 1961, the building had around 50,000 square feet (4,600 m^{2}) of floor space and advertised itself as a "discount department store". Other similar stores opened in Greensboro, Louisville, Roanoke and Virginia Beach before a prototype store that opened in High Point, North Carolina. In 1965, Roses opened a store in Morristown, Tennessee. From this point on until the 1990s, Roses began replacing smaller stores with these large shopping center locations. These shopping centers stores upgraded the lunch counters that had been a feature in most of the older downtown stores with cafeterias.

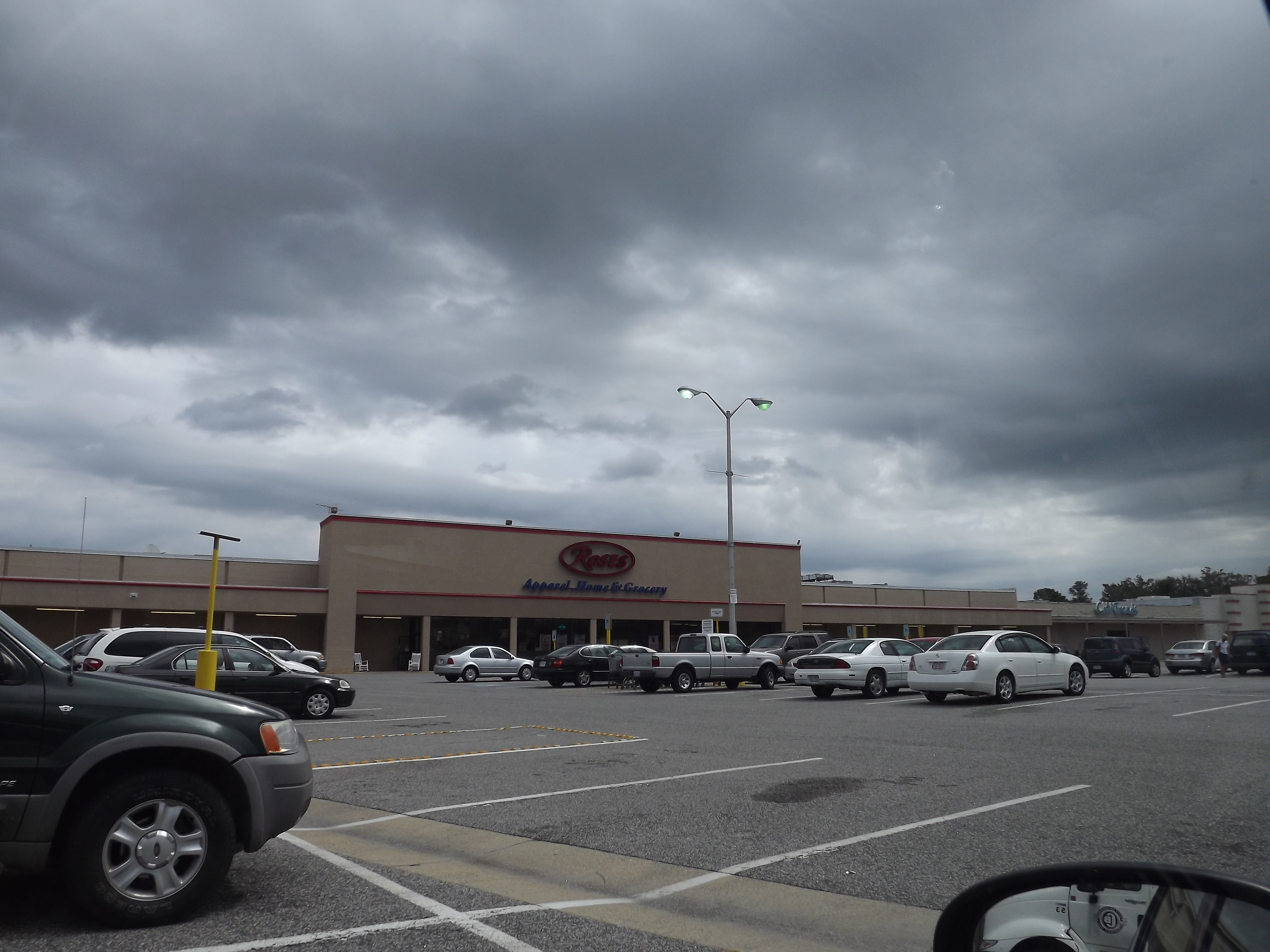
First prototype of combination discount store/grocery format "Roses Apparel, Home and Grocery", Elizabeth City, North Carolina shortly after conversion on 17 September 2012. This location is one of the largest stores in the chain at 65,000 sq. ft.

In the late 1970s, the upscale PHR Center Shops (about six remained) were merged into the main operation while the remaining small stores were grouped into a division called "P.H. Rose Variety Stores", which the company continued to operate until it sold the remaining 50+ locations to Variety Wholesalers in 1984 to concentrate on their larger stores.

=== Struggles and later developments ===
When Walmart first moved into the region in the early 1980s, its larger store format seriously diminished Roses' market share and profitability. Roses filed for Chapter 11 bankruptcy in 1993, and had emerged from it by May 1995. In 1997, Roses was purchased by Variety Wholesalers, which dates back to the 1932 opening of Pope's 5 & 10 cent stores in Fuquay-Varina and Angier, North Carolina. There were 106 Roses stores in operation when Variety completed the purchase. Variety quickly returned the Roses stores to profitability and soon began an expansion program that has doubled the number of stores. Rose's Stores, Inc. was renamed Variety Stores, Inc. in 2001 but the stores have continued to operate under the Roses name.

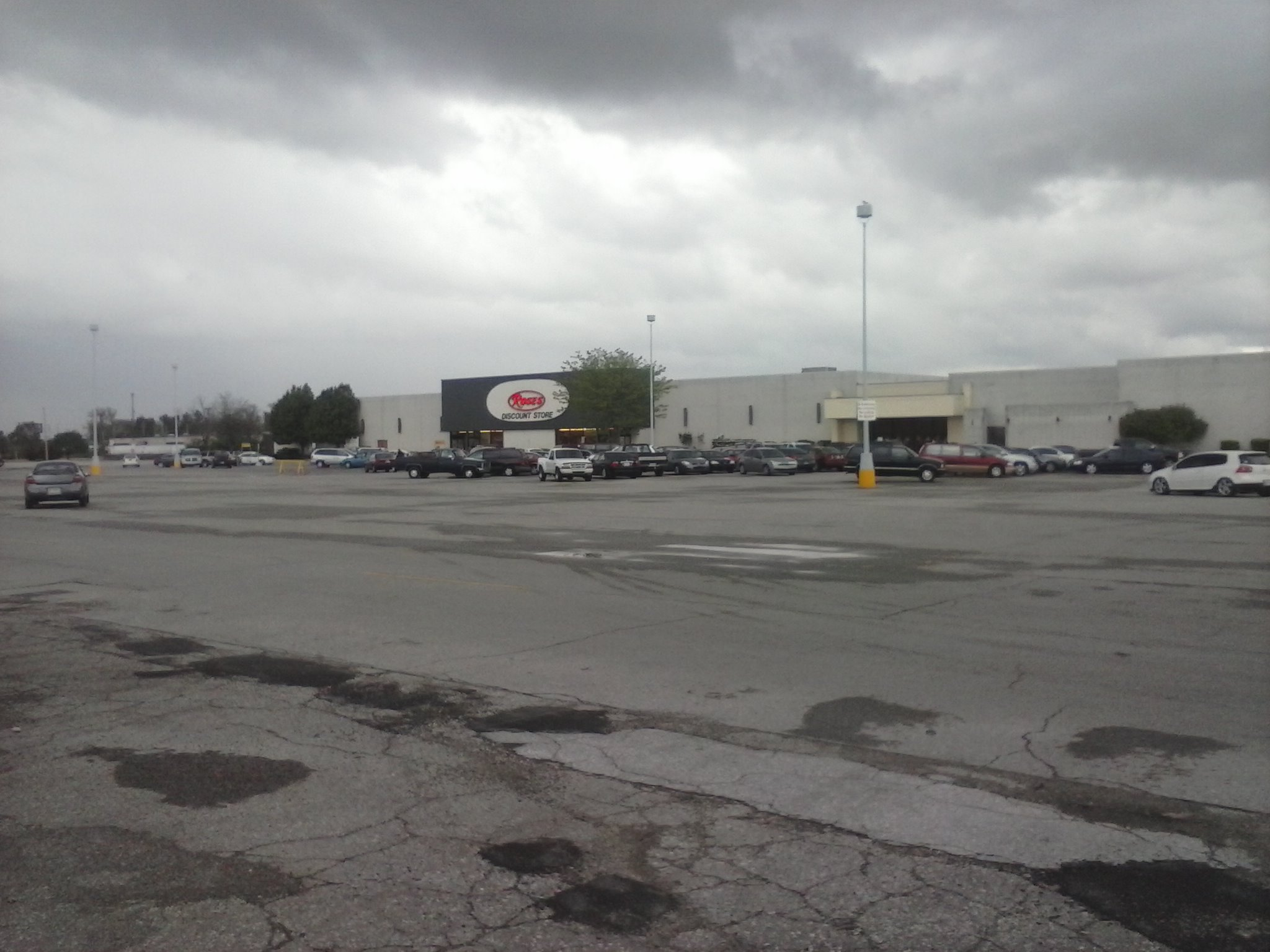
Roses store at Five Points Mall in Marion, Indiana. This location is Roses first store in Indiana, and among three stores in Indiana--the others are in Anderson and Indianapolis.

Roses has begun opening stores in Jacksonville, Florida, again in 2011 and 2012. They are located on Arlington Road and Lem Turner Road in an old K-Mart store. In the early 1970s Roses had been recognized as one of the nation's most rapidly growing retail chains. It was in the early 1970s that the company expanded into Florida, opening 4 stores in metro Jacksonville, 4 stores in metro Orlando, and 1 store each in Holiday and Tarpon Springs. This expansion soon created serious supply chain problems with the company's distribution centers located primarily in the Carolinas and these stores were subsequently closed.

Starting in mid-2012, Roses launched a prototype combination store located in Elizabeth City, North Carolina, incorporating a full grocery department with complete produce, meat, dairy, and frozen food departments. The grocery location was replaced in 2015 with a Save-a-Lot grocery store operated by Variety Wholesalers as a franchisee following the successful debut of a Save-a-Lot grocery franchised to Variety Wholesalers adjacent to the Roses located in Raleigh, North Carolina. However, the Elizabeth City Save-a-Lot has closed as of September 30, 2017.

On May 11, 2024, the Rose’s store in Ocean City, Maryland closed its doors after 45 years in that location.
