= Five Points Mall =

Shopping mall in Marion, Indiana, United States

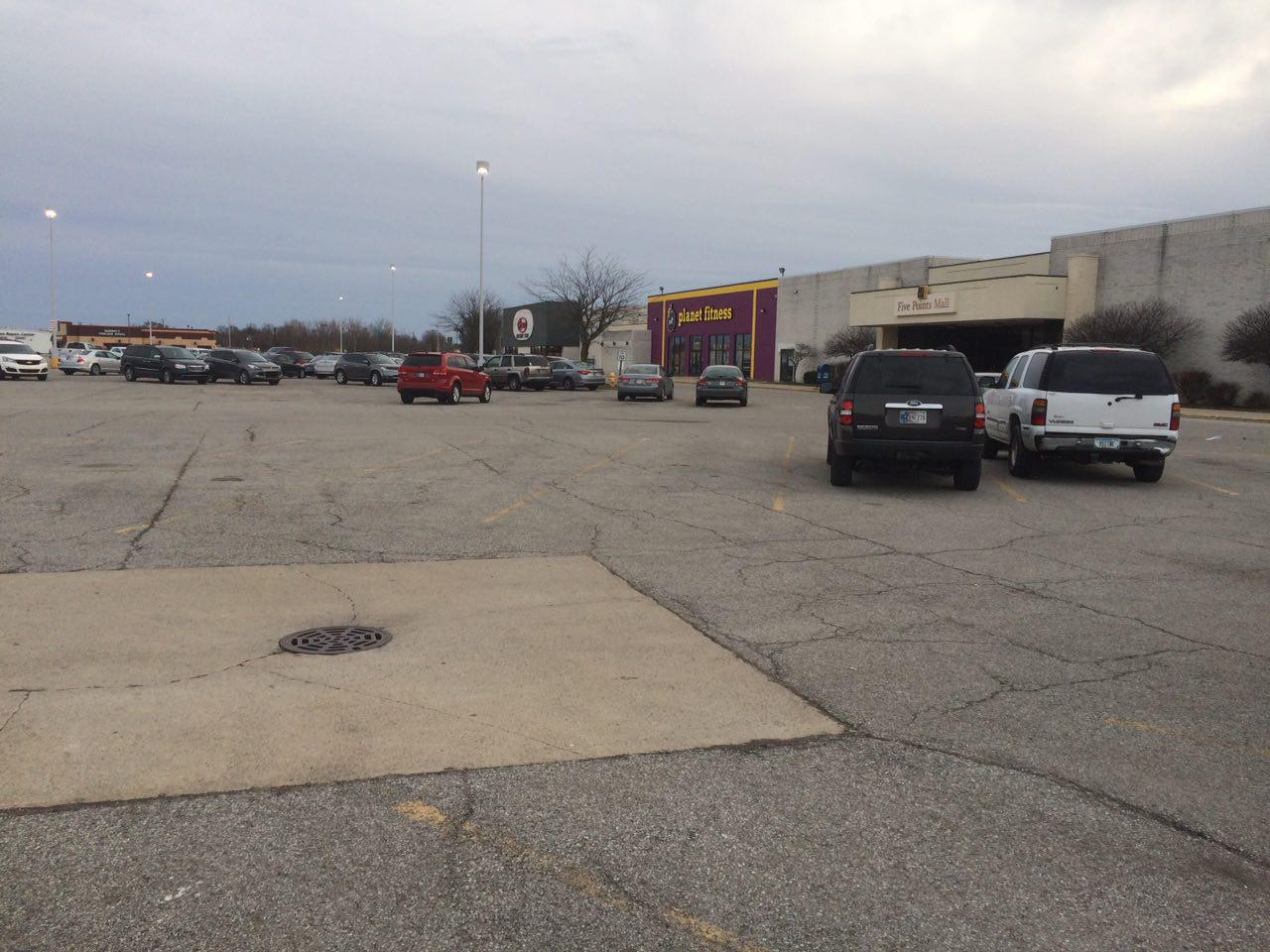
- The mall's exterior in 2018.
- Location: Marion, Indiana, United States
- Coordinates: 40.574512°N 85.679882°W
- Address: 1129 North Baldwin Avenue
- Opened: 1961
- Closed: 2019
- Developer: Cafaro Company
- Manager: Jim McDowell
- Owner: Select Strategies
- Num. of anchor tenants: 4
- Floor area: 464,827 sq ft (43,183.8 m^{2})
- Floors: 1

Five Points Mall, formerly North Park Plaza and North Park Mall, was an enclosed shopping mall in Marion, Indiana, United States. Opened in 1961 as a strip mall, it was expanded into an enclosed property in 1978. The mall's sole anchor store is Roses, with vacant anchors previously occupied by JCPenney, Sears, and Carson's. The interior mall has been closed since 2019 except for Planet Fitness, which is accessible via an exterior entrance. The Mall is managed by Select Strategies.

== History ==
North Park Plaza opened in 1961 as a conventional strip mall on the north side of Marion, Indiana, at the corner of Kem Road and Baldwin Avenue. Built by Cafaro Company of Youngstown, Ohio, the original shopping center included W.T. Grant, Woolworth, Hook's Drug Stores, and Standard Supermarket among its tenants.

The plaza was expanded and converted to an enclosed shopping mall in 1978, known as North Park Mall. its original anchor stores were JCPenney, Hills (became Ames in 1998, then Steve & Barry's in 2004, now Roses). and Meis (later Elder-Beerman, and finally Carson's in 2011. Carson's Closed in 2018). Sears was later added in 1990. The movie theater, also an original tenant, closed in the late 1990s, It was Split into an Arcade and a Hibbett Sports. Other early tenants included a Standard Supermarket, then Hank's Supermarket (which later became part of Lance's New Market, later Rulers). At the end of 2013, the Sears closed permanently as a result of low sales of the 2011 holiday season. On January 15, 2014, JCPenney announced it was closing their Five Points location, despite still having a lease on the space until 2017. On January 31, 2018, The Bon-Ton announced that the Carson's location would be closing. The store closed April 29, 2018. Carson's was the last Original Tenant from the Mall's Opening. In early 2019, most of the mall was boarded off, and the only part that was open is by the former Carson's. An Applebee's remained open and had access to the remaining mall space. Roses and Planet Fitness (which opened in 2018 with exterior entrances only, and taking space formerly occupied by vacant storefronts including KB Toys, Hallmark, and Finish line) also are open but cannot access the mall. In late 2019, the mall's interior fully closed, leaving no stores left except Roses, Applebee's, and Planet Fitness. Applebee's moved out of the mall to a new location in March 2026, followed by Roses announcing their permanent closure due to ceiling leaks and other maintenance issues. As of September 14 2026,Planet Fitness announced closure of its Marion location due to hazards, leaving no businesses remaining.

== Gallery ==
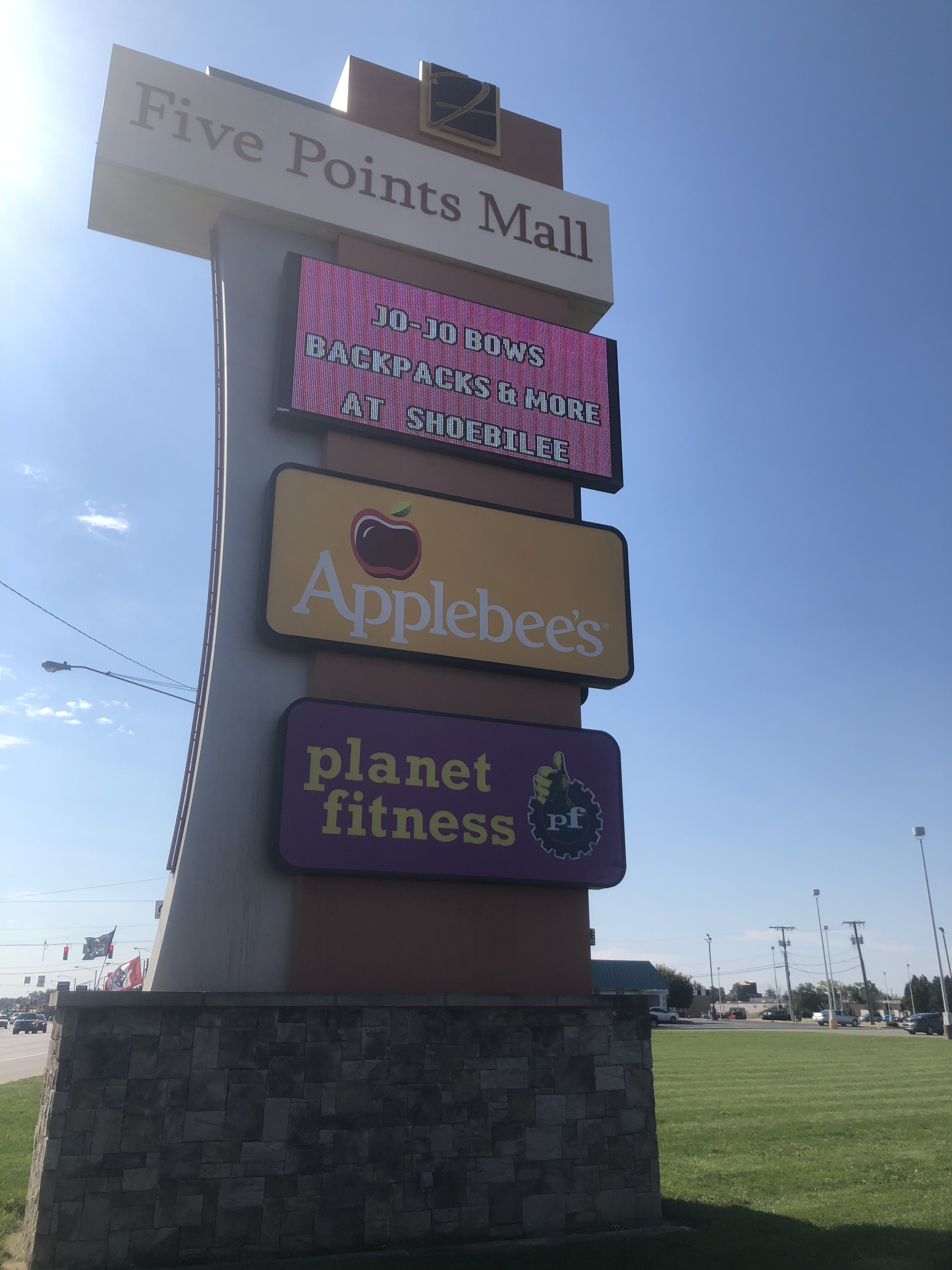
Five Points Mall Sign

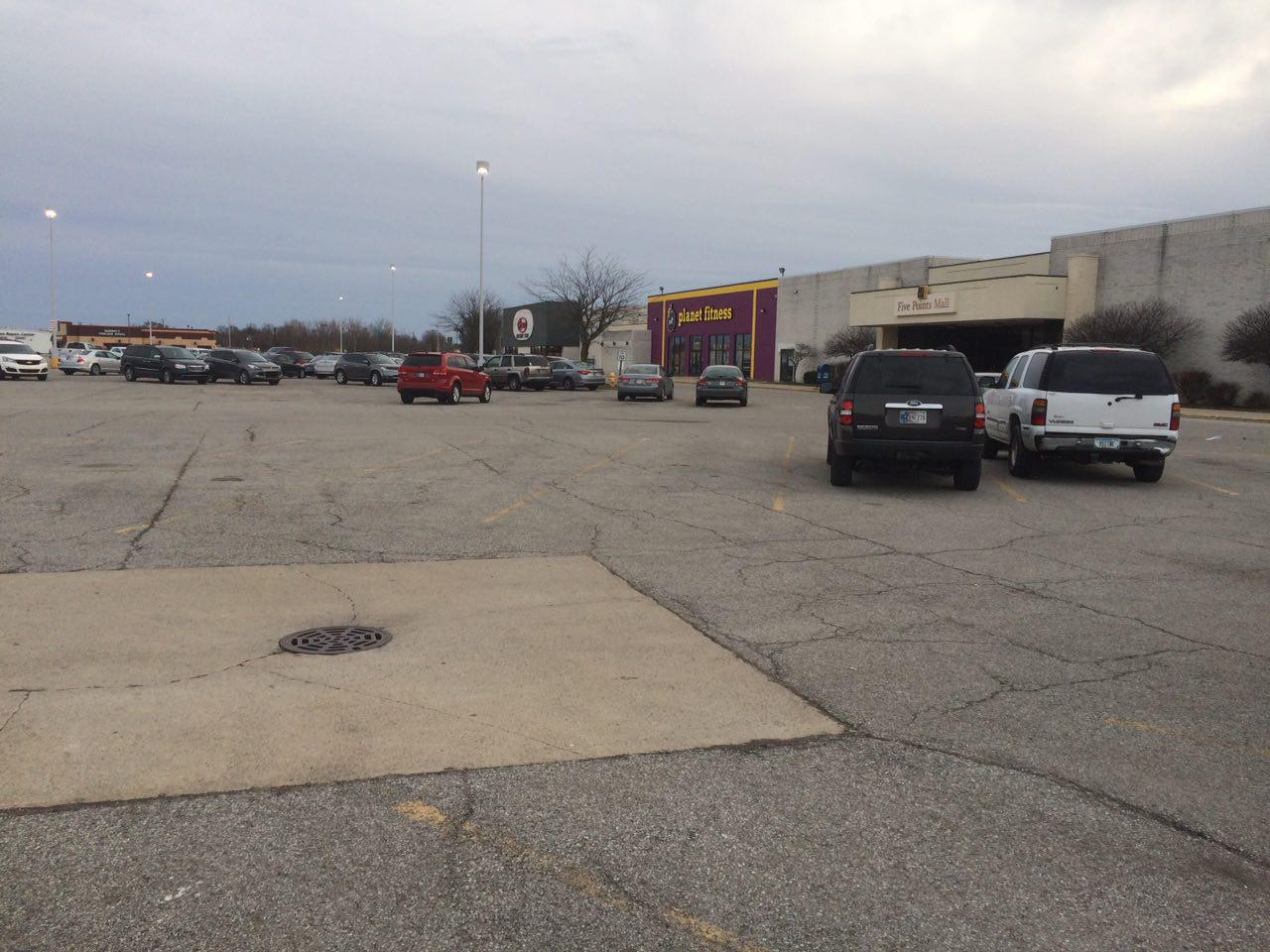
Parking lot

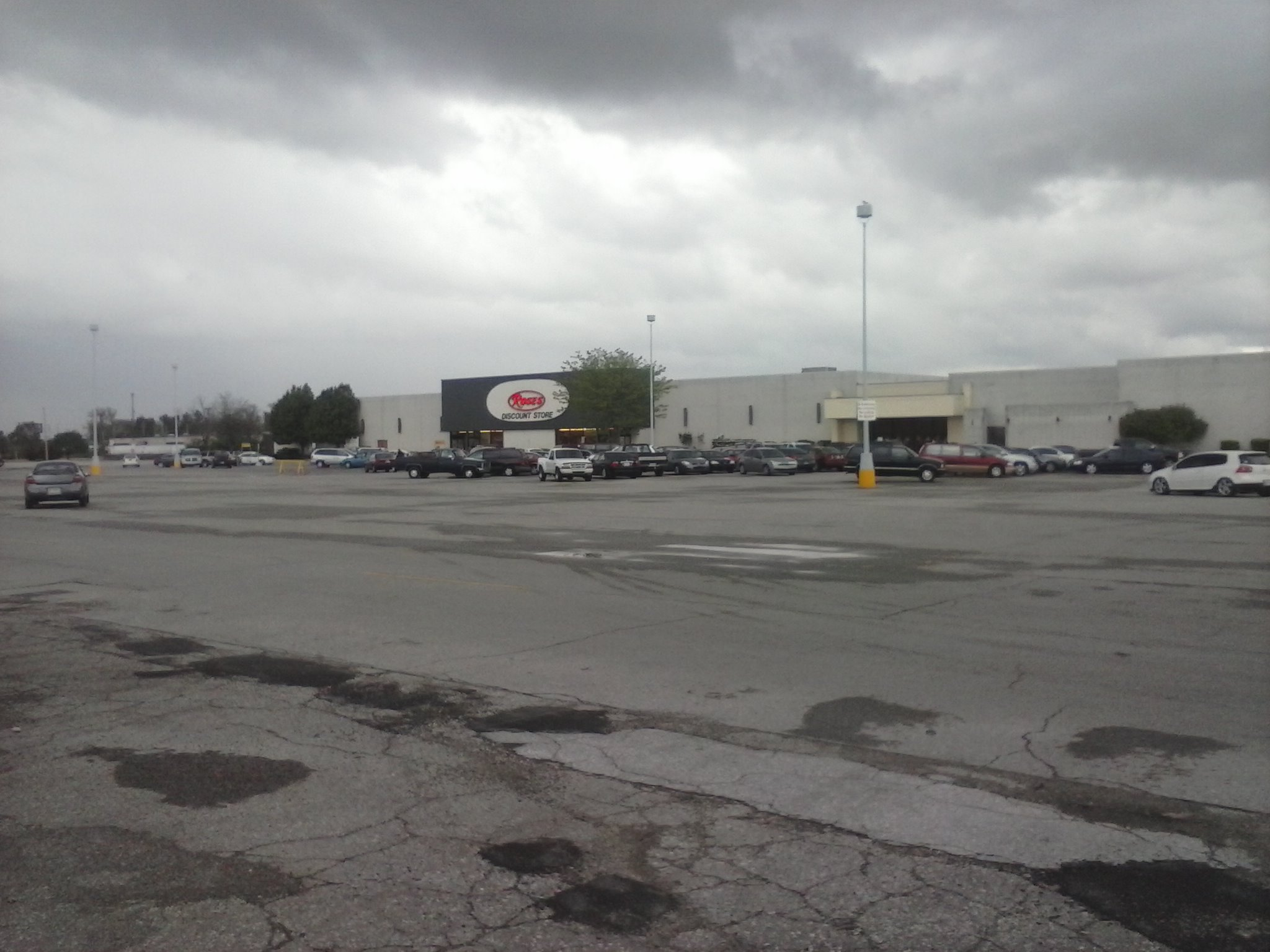
Roses at Five Points Mall

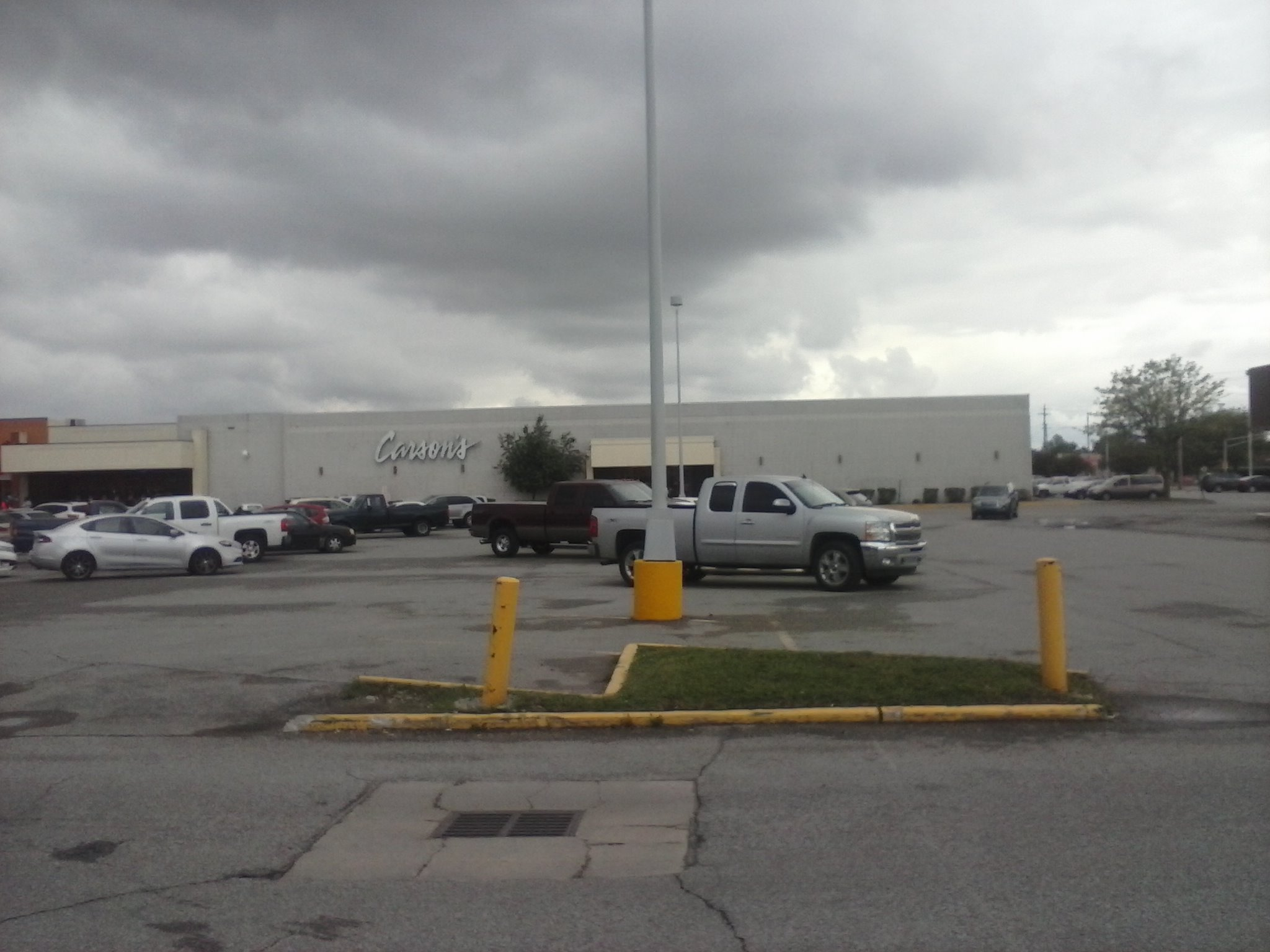
Former Carson's

== See also ==
- List of shopping malls in the United States
