= Eco-capitalism =

View that capital exists in nature as "natural capital"

Eco-capitalism, also known as environmental capitalism or (sometimes) green capitalism, is the view that capital exists in nature as "natural capital" (ecosystems that have ecological yield) on which all wealth depends. Therefore, governments should use market-based policy-instruments (such as a carbon tax) to resolve environmental problems.

The term "Blue Greens" is often applied to those who espouse eco-capitalism. Eco-capitalism can be thought of as the right-wing equivalent to Red Greens.

Critics of eco-capitalism, such as eco-socialists, view continued economic growth and commodification of nature as an inevitability in capitalism, and thus criticize bright-green environmentalism.

== History ==
The roots of eco-capitalism can be traced back to the late 1960s. The "Tragedy of the Commons", an essay published in 1968 in Science by Garrett Hardin, claimed the inevitability of Malthusian catastrophe due to liberal or democratic government's policies to leave family size matters to the family, and enabling the welfare state to willingly care for potential human overpopulation. Hardin argued that if families were given freedom of choice in the matter, but were removed from a welfare state, parents choosing to overbear would not have the resources to provide for their "litter", thus solving the problem of overpopulation. This represents an early argument made from an eco-capitalist standpoint: overpopulation would technically be solved by a free market. John Baden, a collaborator with Garrett Hardin on other works including Managing the Commons, founded the Political Economy Research Center (now called the Property and Environment Research Center) in 1982. As one of the first eco-capitalist organizations created, PERC's ongoing mission is "improving environmental quality through property rights and markets". The most popular eco-capitalist idea was emissions trading, or more commonly, cap and trade. Emissions trading, a market-based approach that allows polluting entities to purchase or be allocated permits, began being researched in the late 1960s. International emissions trading was significantly popularized in the 1990s when the United Nations adopted the Kyoto Protocol in 1997.

== Eco-capitalist theorists ==
- Terry L. Anderson, a graduate of the University of Montana who received his Ph.D. from Washington University in St. Louis, and who serves as the co-chair of the Hoover Institution's Property Rights, Freedom and Prosperity task force, has advocated that free markets can be both economically beneficial and environmentally protective. Anderson specializes in how markets impact Native American communities and their economies. Anderson is a co-author of Free Market Environmentalism, a book that explores how free market ideas could be used to solve environmental issues, based on Anderson's conclusion on a few case studies.
- Bruce Yandle, a graduate of Mercer University, attended Georgia State University where he earned an MBA and PhD. Yandle is the dean emeritus of Clemson University's college of business. He is prominent in the field of eco-capitalism for his story of the "Bootlegger and the Baptist". Yandle's theory of the Bootlegger and the Baptist posits that ethical groups, religious institutions and business captains can align their organizations in the interest of regulation and economic growth.
- Paul Hawken is the architect of the United States first natural foods company, Erewhon Trading Company, where all products were organically composed. Hawken founded the research organization, Natural Capital Institute, and developed Wiser Earth, a program focused on providing a platform for all to communicate about the environment. Hawken has authored hundreds of publications, including four best selling books. In his writings, Hawken stresses that many viable ecological options exist for businesses that will benefit the environment, while simultaneously bringing about economic profit. One idea discussed in his book, Natural Capitalism: Creating the Next Industrial Revolution, is the possibility of developing lightweight, electricity-powered cars as an alternative to current transportation modes. Hawken attributes the hesitancy of adopting these options to lack of knowledge of these alternatives and high initial costs. Hawken is now the head of OneSun, Inc., an energy corporation concentrated on low-cost solar.
- Lester Brown began his career as a tomato farmer in New Jersey, before earning a degree at Rutgers University and traveling to a rural India for a six-month study of the country's food and population crisis. Brown has primarily focused on finding alternatives which he contends would provide solutions to the world's population and resources problem. With financial support from Rockefeller Brothers Fund, Brown created the Worldwatch Institute, the first dedicated to researching global environmental problems. In 2001, Brown founded the Earth Policy Institute, an organization that outlines a vision for creating an environmentally sustainable economy. Brown has authored over 50 books and received 25 honorary degrees. In his publications, Brown posits that the key to an eco-friendly economy is an honest market. He advocates for replacing harmful aspects of the environment, like fossil fuels, with renewable energy. In June 2015, Brown retired from Earth Policy and closed the institute.

== Think tanks ==
- Property and Environment Research Center (PERC)
- Foundation for Research on Economics and the Environment (FREE)

== Transition to eco-capitalism ==
The ideology of eco-capitalism was adopted to satisfy two competing needs:

1. the desire for generating profit by businesses in a capitalist society and
2. the urgency for proper actions to address a struggling environment negatively impacted by human activity.

Under the doctrine of eco-capitalism, businesses commodify the act of addressing environmental issues.

The following are common principles in the transition to eco-capitalism.

=== Externalities: Correcting of a free market failure ===
A central part of eco-capitalism is to correct for the market failure seen in the externalization of pollution. By treating the issue of pollution as an externality it has allowed the market to minimize the degree of accountability. To correct for this market failure eco-capitalism would have to internalize this cost. A prime example of this shift towards internalizing externalities is seen in the adoption of a system for carbon trading. In a system like this people are forced to factor the pollution cost into their expenses. This system as well as other systems of internalization function on large and small scales (oftentimes both are tightly connected). On a corporate scale, the government can regulate carbon emissions and other polluting factors in business practices forcing companies to either reduce their pollution levels, externalize these costs onto their consumers by raising the cost of their goods/services, and/or a combination of the two. These kinds of systems can also be effective in indirectly creating a more environmentally conscious consumer base. As the companies who are creating the most pollution face falling profit levels and rising prices their consumers and investors are inclined to take their business elsewhere. This migration of investment and revenue would then be expected to make its way to business who have already incorporated the minimization of pollution into their business model thus allowing them to provide lower prices and higher profit margins attracting the migrating consumers and investors.

=== Green consumption ===
At the conception of the ideology, major theorists of eco-capitalism, Paul Hawken, Lester Brown, and Francis Cairncross, saw an opportunity to establish a different approach to environmentalism in a capitalist society. These theorists posited that consumers as well as producers could shoulder the social responsibility of environmental restoration if "green technology, green taxes, green labeling, and eco-conscious shopping" existed. The resulting "shopping our way to sustainability" mentality encouraged the development of organic farming, renewable energy, green certifications as well as other eco-friendly practices.

A 2015 report from the Nielsen Corporation lends credence to this theory. According to the report, consumers have more brand loyalty and are willing to pay higher prices for a product that is perceived as being sustainable. This is especially true among Millennials and Generation Z. These generations currently make up 48% of the global marketplace and still have not hit their peak spending levels. As these generations' preferences continue to shape how businesses operate and market themselves, they could drive a continued shift toward green consumption.

According to the Annual Review of Environmental Resources, "the focus of policy makers, businesses, and researchers has mostly been on the latter (consuming differently), with relatively little attention paid to consuming less". A review of how to encourage sustainable consumption from the University of Surrey shows that, "Government policies send important signals to consumers about institutional goals and national priorities." Governments can pull a variety of levers to signal this including product, trading, building, media, and marketing standards.

=== Carbon trading ===
Creating perhaps the first major eco-capitalist endorsement, many political and economic institutions support a system of pollution credits. Such a system, which assigns property rights to emissions, is considered to be the most "efficient and effective" way for regulating greenhouse gas emissions in the current neoliberal global economy. Especially in the case of tradable pollution credits, the resulting market-based system of emissions regulation is believed to motivate businesses to invest in technology that reduce greenhouse gas emissions using positive reinforcement (i.e. ability to trade unused credits) and punishment (i.e. the need to buy more credits).

=== Full cost accounting ===
Environmental full-cost accounting explains corporate actions on the basis of the triple bottom line, which is best summarized as "people, planet, and profit". As a concept of corporate social responsibility, full cost accounting not only considers social and economic costs and benefits but also the environmental implications of specific corporate actions.

While there has been progress in measuring the cost of harm to the health of individuals and the environment, the interaction of environmental, social, and health effects makes measurement difficult. Measurement attempts can be broadly categorized as either behavioral in nature, like hedonic pricing, or dose-response which looks at indirect effects. A standardized measurement of these costs has yet to emerge. This should not be confused with the full-cost method used by organizations searching for oil and gas that "does not differentiate between operating expenses associated with successful and unsuccessful exploration projects".

=== Genuine progress indicator ===
The current standard of using the gross domestic product (GDP) as an indicator of welfare is criticized for being inaccurate. An alternative to GDP, the genuine progress indicator compensates for the shortcomings of the GDP as a welfare indicator by accounting for environmental harms as well as other factors that affect consumption, such as crime and income inequality.

== Criticism and responses ==
A fundamental criticism of the eco-capitalist idea rests on the idea that the commodification of nature and environmental services plus the principles of growth economics and sustainability cannot (easily) coexist.

A majority of the criticisms from traditionally unregulated capitalism is due to eco-capitalism's increased regulation. Pollution credits (as a means for regulating greenhouse gas emissions) is traditionally at odds with economically laissez-faire ideologies. Elements of unregulated capitalism prefer environmental issues to be addressed by individuals who may allocate their own income and wealth, oppose the commodification of by-products like carbon emissions, and emphasize positive incentives to maintain resources through free-market competition and entrepreneurship.

Proponents of eco-capitalism view environmental reform like pollution credits as a more transformative and progressive system. According to these proponents, since free market capitalism as inherently expansionist in tendency, ignoring environmental responsibility is a danger to the environment. Approximately 36% of Americans are deeply concerned about climate issues. Proponents of eco-capitalism typically favor political environmentalism, which emphasizes negative incentives like regulation and taxes to encourage the conservation of resources and prevent environmental harm.

Political theorist Antonio Gramsci cites theories of common sense, which suggests that, in general, free market capitalism absent of environmental reform, is ingrained in the minds of its members as the only viable and successful form of economic organization through cultural hegemony. Therefore, the proposal of any alternate economic system, like eco-capitalism, must overcome the predominant common sense and economic status quo in order to develop opposing theories. Nonetheless, movements in the United States and abroad have continued to push for reforms to protect the environment in current capitalistic systems.

Another political theorist, Daniel Tanuro, explains in his book Green Capitalism: Why it Can't Work that for green capitalism to be successful, it would have to replace current mainstream capitalism with eco-socialist methods, while defying corporate interests:

If by "green capitalism" we understand a system in which the qualitative, social and ecological parameters are taken in account by the numerous competing capitals, that is to say even within economic activity as an endogenous mechanism, then we are completely deluded. In fact, we would be talking about a form of capitalism in which the law of value was no longer in operation, which is a contradiction in terms

However, Tanuro adds that social and economical change to the current capitalist systems is necessary, because technology will invariably increase emissions as manufacturing processes and distribution systems progress. Tanuro argues for changes in three areas:

1. Use of transportation methods
2. Agriculture and dietary changes
3. Overall consumer lifestyle and market spending

Despite this argument, critics still claim that green consumption, sustainable behavior on the part of the consumer, is not enough to be instituted as a socio-environmental solution. In accordance with hegemony, capitalism agrees that the government has little control over market and buyers, sellers, and consumers ultimately drive the market. In contrast, in green capitalism, the government would have more control therefore; consumers do not have direct power over the market, and should not be held accountable.

Environmental scholar Bill McKibben proposes "full scale climate mobilization" to address environmental decay. During World War II, vehicle manufacturers and general goods manufacturers shifted to producing weapons, military vehicles and war time goods. McKibben argues that, to combat environmental change, the American Military Industrial Complex and other national arms producers could shift to producing solar panels, wind turbines and other environmental products in an eco-capitalist system.

== Appeal of renewable energy in the capitalist market ==
Tom Randall, a correspondent specializing in renewable energy for Bloomberg, calls to attention that wind and solar energy are "outperforming" fossil fuels. In terms of investments, clean energy outperforms both gas and coal by a 2-1 margin. This positive margin may be attributed to the consistently falling price of renewable energy production. Renewable energy sources hold assertive advantages over fossil fuels because they exist as technologies, not fuels. As time proceeds, renewable energy becomes inevitably more efficient as technology adapts. Technologies for extracting fuels may change, but the fuels remain as constants. Both the solar and wind industries have proven growth over time: Over the last 15 years, the solar industry has doubled seven times and the wind industry has doubled four times. In contrast, the fossil fuel industry has declined over the last 15 years. America's coal industry has lost 75 percent of its value within the past few years.

Renewable energy sources also gain advantages over the fossil fuel industry through international governmental support. Globally, governments implement subsidies to boost the renewable energy industry. Concurrently, various global efforts fight against fossil fuel production and use. The demand for renewable energy sources has skyrocketed in the last 15 years, while fossil fuels have drastically fallen in demand (in capitalist societies).

The worldwide concern of climate change (also known as global warming) is notably the largest contributor to the green energy industry's rapid acceleration, just as it is largely responsible for the decline of the fossil fuel industry. The overwhelming scientific consensus of climate change's reality and its potential catastrophic effects have caused a large part of the world's population to respond with panic and immediate action. While the world's response has been strong, environmentalists and climate scientists do not believe the response has been strong enough to counter climate change's effects, and that the transition from fossil fuels to renewable energy sources is moving far too slowly.

The global efforts and concerns of both governments and individuals to take action regarding implementing and transforming a society's energy sources from fossil fuels to renewable energy sources show the enormous potential of the green energy market. This potential is seen in the countless renewable energy projects under way. Currently, there are over 4,000 major solar projects being implemented. These, and all renewable energy projects, set goals of long-term economic benefit.

The Global Apollo Programme, set up by both economists and scientists, has a goal of creating a solar capability that can stand as a cheaper alternative to coal-fueled power plants by 2025. In capitalist markets, solar energy has the very real potential of becoming a direct competitor to coal plants in less than a decade.

=== Barriers to transition ===
One of the most daunting barriers to the transition to an eco-capitalist system is the systemic barrier that can be created by former models. Dimitri Zenghelis explores the idea of path dependence and the how continuing to build infrastructure without foresight seriously impedes the implementation and benefits of future innovations. Zenghelis uses the term "locked-in" to describe situations where the full implementation of a new innovation cannot be seen because an earlier infrastructure prevents it from functioning well. This barrier is exemplified in older cities like Los Angeles, San Francisco and New York where the infrastructure was designed around urban sprawl to accommodate private vehicles. The sprawl has been researched with the results returning that the moving forward mega-cities need to be constructed as eco-cities if the hope of curving emission levels down is going to have any hope.

== See also ==
- Business model – Description of how businesses operate
- Climate justice – Concept for social justice in climate change context
- Ecotax – Compulsory fee intended to discourage environmentally harmful acts
- Ecological economics – Interdependence of human economies and natural ecosystems
- Eco-nationalism – Political ideology combining environmentalism with nationalism
- Eco-socialism – Ideology merging aspects of socialism with green politics, ecology and alter-globalization
- Enviro-Capitalists: Doing Good While Doing Well – Book by Terry L. Anderson and Donald R. Leal
- Environmental economics – Sub-field of economics
- Ethical consumerism – Type of consumer activism
- Free-market environmentalism – Political and economic philosophy
- Geolibertarianism – Political and economic ideology integrating libertarianism with Georgism
- Georgism – Economic philosophy centered on common ownership of land
- Green economy – Economy based on ecological economics
- Green growth – Economic growth that is environmentally sustainable
- Green libertarianism – Political ideology with mixed green and libertarian beliefs
- Greenwashing – Misleading environmental marketing claims
- Natural Capitalism – 1999 book by Hawken, Lovins, & Lovins
- Natural resource economics – Supply, demand and allocation of the Earth's natural resources
- Pigovian tax – Tax on activity generating negative externalities
- Pink capitalism – Capitalist appropriation and assimilation of sexual diversity
- Purple capitalism – Capitalist appropriation and assimilation of feminism
- Sustainable business – Minimal negative or positive effect on the environment
- Tax shift – Budget tweak and redistribution of income
- Tragedy of the anticommons – Type of resource coordination breakdown
- Tragedy of the commons – Overuse of a shared resource
