= Property and Environment Research Center =

Free-market environmentalist group

- Abbreviation: PERC
- Formation: 1980; 45 years ago
- Type: Nonprofit
- Tax ID no.: 81-0393444
- Legal status: 501(c)(3)
- Purpose: Conservation of the environment
- Headquarters: Bozeman, Montana
- Fields: Free-market environmentalism Eco-capitalism
- Board Chair: Loren Bough
- Executive Director: Brian Yablonski
- Revenue: $6.78 million (2024)
- Expenses: $4.42 million (2024)
- Website: perc.org
- Formerly called: Political Economy Research Center

The Property and Environment Research Center (PERC), previously known as the Political Economy Research Center, is a free-market environmentalist think tank based in Bozeman, Montana, United States. Established in 1980, PERC is dedicated to original research on market approaches to resolving environmental problems.

== History ==
PERC began as an intellectual collaboration between economists John Baden and Richard L. Stroup. PERC started with a simple question: "If markets can produce bread and cars, why can't they produce environmental quality?"

In 1978, the two men established the Center for Political Economy and Natural Resources at Montana State University with the help of Terry L. Anderson, P.J. Hill and Ronald Johnson. Later, they founded PERC as a free-standing research institution with the goal of showing that economic freedom can improve environmental quality.

While PERC later adopted the term "free market environmentalism," the original concept was called the New Resource Economics, which was discussed in an article by Terry Anderson in the American Journal of Agricultural Economics. As Anderson indicated in his article in the AJAE, the New Resource Economics combined neoclassical economics, property rights, public choice, and Austrian economics.

Notable former board members, fellows and alumni include Tim Sheehy, Henry N. Butler, Jonathan H. Adler, Gary Libecap, Bart Wilson, Jane S. Shaw, Bruce Yandle.

== Outreach ==
PERC engages in research and advocacy related to free-market environmentalism and is active on issues including endangered species, water, pollution, and public lands. PERC says that government policy is the root cause of much environmental degradation. The Dust Bowl Reconsidered, for instance, blames the federal Homestead Act for accelerating erosion problems by limiting claims of newly settled land to 160–320 acres (0.65–1.29 km^{2}) parcels. According to this article, fragmented land ownership reduced the incentives for implementing erosion countermeasures and made it difficult for farmers to negotiate contracts for voluntary soil conservation.

PERC seeks to influence public policy by publishing guides for Congressional staff and organizing weeklong seminars for undergraduates. The organization's monthly publication, PERC Reports, regularly features articles questioning assumptions that form the basis of U.S. federal environmental law.
