= Foundation for Research on Economics and the Environment =

American think tank

- Abbreviation: FREE
- Formation: 1985; 41 years ago
- Founder: John A. Baden, Ph.D.
- Type: Nonprofit
- Tax ID no.: 94-3170425
- Headquarters: Gallatin Gateway, Montana
- Fields: Free-market environmentalism Eco-capitalism
- Board Chair: John A. Baden, Ph.D.
- Board of directors: John A. Baden, Ph.D.; Honorable Alice Batchelder; Honorable Edith Brown Clement; James Huffman; John McCormack; John A. Von Kannon; Todd Zywicki; Ramona Marotz-Baden, Ph.D.; Professor Jonathan H. Adler
- Website: https://www.free-eco.org/

The Foundation for Research on Economics and the Environment (FREE), based in Gallatin Gateway, Montana, is an American think tank that promotes free-market environmentalism. FREE emphasizes reliance on market mechanisms and private property rights, rather than on regulation, for protection of the environment. Its chairperson and founder, John Baden, stresses decentralization: a shift of control from what he calls "green platonic despots" in the federal government to "local interests," including environmental groups. Citing conservation efforts such as those involving the Rocky Mountain Elk, Pheasants Forever, and Trout Unlimited, Baden asserts that the ideas FREE promotes have become "the norm among progressive, intellectually honest and successful environmentalists." FREE's mission is to attract and work with conservationists, conservatives, and classical liberals who treasure responsible liberty, sustainable ecology, and modest prosperity.

John Baden has been a pioneer in free market environmentalism and its academic forerunner, the New Resource Economics. That work began with a 1973 article co-written with Richard Stroup, "Externality, Property Rights, and the Management of Our National Forests," in the Journal of Law and Economics. This article identified problems with federal management of the national forests and explored the possible impacts of shifting those forests to private ownership.

One of FREE's past projects was the "Charter Forest" project, in which control of national forests were to be devolved to local trusts. The plan was proposed by the Bush administration in 2002.

Since 1992, FREE has offered expense-paid seminars in its philosophy to federal judges. These seminars have included such topics as "Environmental Protection: The Role of Community-Based Solutions to Environmental Problems", "The Environment: A CEO's Perspective", and "Liberty and the Environment: A Case for Judicial Activism". FREE says that nearly a third of the federal judiciary had either attended or were seeking to attend its seminars in the late 1990s. The group also offers expense-paid courses for university faculty and students, these reportedly taught on the campus of Montana State University.

In 2003, FREE was noted in a peer-reviewed research to be among the organizations involved in environmental-skeptic and global-warming policy debates in the 1990s.

Between August 14 and 19, 2004, FREE hosted the 2004 general meeting of the Mont Pèlerin Society at the Grand America Hotel in Salt Lake City, Utah.

== Board ==
- John A. Baden, PhD
- Ramona Marotz-Baden
- Alice M. Batchelder
- Edith Brown Clement
- Jim Huffman
- John McCormack
- John Von Kannon
- Todd Zywicki
- Jonathan H. Adler

=== Former Board Members ===
- Danny J. Boggs
- Steven J. Eagle
- Edwin Meese, III, JD
