= Free Market Environmentalism =

1991 book by Terry L. Anderson and Donald R. Leal

- First edition
- Author: Terry L. Anderson and Donald R. Leal
- Publisher: Pacific Research Institute for Public Policy
- Publication date: 1991
- ISBN: 0936488336

Free Market Environmentalism is a book by Terry L. Anderson and Donald R. Leal that was of great importance to the free market environmentalist movement.

== Summary ==
The book focuses on a method of environmental protection with minimal bureaucratic intervention. Anderson and Leal argue that free markets have been making the environment cleaner for centuries and that private innovations, such as the energy consumption of cars, are more effective than government intervention. The book contains a number of case studies where juries recognize that a company is harming an individual and grant appropriate reparations. The central argument is that property rights, which are resolved through a direct transfer of payments between parties, are more effective as a form of environmental protection than government intervention through taxes.

== Reception ==
The book was intended as an ideological tract and a call to action, rather than as an empirical study. Glenn Fox of the American Journal of Agricultural Economics lauded the book for its readability and described its reference list as "one of the most comprehensive offerings currently available in this area."

John A. Douglass of Forest & Conservation History praised the book for presenting the possibility of replacing zero-sum contests between industry and conservationists with markets that would allow for mutually acceptable arrangements. However, he also criticized the book as having a narrow assessment of environmental values and various policy options, and not weighing historical facts carefully.

David Pearce of The Economic Journal criticized the book for, in his view, not presenting a persuasive argument for tradeable permits, inasmuch as only one significant example of their application to water quality, and that a not very successful one, was cited. Pearce also criticized the book for not explaining how liability rules would work when pollutants are pervasive and synergistic.
