= Enviro-Capitalists =

Book by Terry L. Anderson and Donald R. Leal

Enviro-Capitalists: Doing Good While Doing Well
- Author: Terry L. Anderson; Donald R. Leal
- Language: English
- Subject: Free-market environmentalism
- Publisher: Rowman & Littlefield
- Publication date: 1997
- Publication place: United States
- Media type: Print (hardcover · paperback)
- Pages: 189
- ISBN: 978-0-8476-8382-6

Enviro-Capitalists: Doing Good While Doing Well is a 1997 book written by economists Terry L. Anderson and Donald R. Leal. In this book, Anderson and Leal further developed the concept of free-market environmentalism, which they first described in their 1992 book Free Market Environmentalism. The book argues that privatization of sectors like wildlife conservation, aquatic habitat development and environment-friendly housing is beneficial and environmental protection should be done by private entrepreneurs, not by the federal government. Enviro-Capitalists received the 1997 Choice Outstanding Academic Book Award.

== Contents ==
The book is divided into nine chapters:

1. Nature's Entrepreneurs
2. Barons of Preservation
3. Mavericks of Conservation
4. The Business of Bambi
5. Buy That Fish a Drink
6. Eco-Developers
7. Going Global
8. Community Spirit
9. The Good, the Bad, and the Ugly

=== Criticism of traditional environmentalism ===
Enviro-Capitalists claims that traditional environmentalists are driven by political opportunism. According to the book, major environmentalist organizations, most of them headquartered in Washington, DC, focus on politics, lobbying and fundraising, and people involved in these organizations spend their time in the United States Congress, not in the "wilds of nature". The book is critical of organizations like the Humane Society of the United States (HSUS) and the World Wide Fund for Nature (WWF) who, it claims, are driven by political and financial agendas rather than environmentalism.

=== Environmental entrepreneurs ===
The book documents the activities and individual case studies of environmental entrepreneurs and enviro-capitalists like Tom Bourland, Peter S. O'Neil, Frank Crisafulli, Zach Willy, Andrew Parkey, Hugh Macrae, Tom Cade, Bob Elgas, Dalle Miller, Bob O'Brien, Greg Koonce, Dayton Hyde.

== Reviews ==
True environmentalists, those who seek to protect the precious biological envelopes that support life and are not simply dedicated to the replacement of individual freedom with command and control regulation, will be encouraged to know that markets are on their side. Friends of liberty, who sometimes find themselves hard-pressed to defend markets in the face of attacks from environmentalists, will welcome the reinforcements provided by this excellent, if too-short book.

— Economist Bruce Yandle on Enviro-Capitalists: Doing Good While Doing Well

According to a review by economist Bruce Yandle in The Freeman, the authors of the book Enviro-Capitalists: Doing Good While Doing Well, instead of depending on theories of free market environmentalism, emphasized the activities of historical and current entrepreneurs who invested in the environmental sector. How entrepreneurs have found niche markets for the conservation of species like the peregrine falcon is explained in the book. Yandle writes that those who mistakenly came to the conclusion that capitalism destroys nature will "find their prejudices strongly challenged" after going through this book. According to him, Enviro-Capitalists will convince the readers that entrepreneurs, if not delayed or discouraged by the government, are able to deliver environmental quality just as they deliver necessary features of life like food, clothing, communications, health care and others. Yandle concludes that this book proves the traditional assumption, that the government is the only solution for wildlife conservation, is wrong.

Andrew Dobson, professor at Keele University, wrote in the journal Environmental Values that the book is "a useful addition to the debate about protecting nature and making money".

Policy Review, published by the Hoover Institution, noted that the book views the growth of enviro-capitalism as a vindication of the views of conservationist Aldo Leopold.

Gregory Dunn, writing for the Religion & Liberty, a magazine published by the Acton Institute, noted that the book builds upon Anderson and Leal's earlier book Free Market Environmentalism. He writes that Enviro-Capitalists respects private and creative initiatives for the purpose of achieving environmental goals. According to Dunn, "Enviro-Capitalism is a persuasive argument that such an environment is not that of the heavy-handed approach of state regulation but a regime of markets, private property, and rule of law."

Michael E. Zimmerman wrote in Strategies: Journal of Theory, Culture & Politics that the book notes the difficulty of reconciling environmental protection and profit-seeking as profit seekers do not always consider the long-term positive effects of conservation, but at the same time the book pointed out that the passing of legislation for the national park system, including the Yellowstone National Park, was the result of lobbying efforts of people known as "robber barons".
