= George Conway =

American attorney and activist (born 1963)

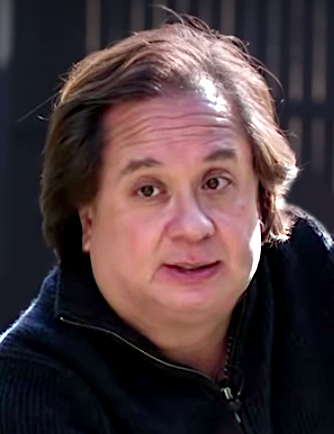
- Conway in 2021
- Born: George Thomas Conway III; September 2, 1963 (age 63); Boston, Massachusetts, U.S.
- Education: Harvard University (BA); Yale University (JD)
- Political party: Republican (before 2018); Independent (2018–2025); Democratic (2025–present)
- Spouse: Kellyanne Fitzpatrick (m. 2001; div. 2023)
- Children: 4

George Thomas Conway III (born September 2, 1963) is an American lawyer and activist. He argued and won the 2010 case Morrison v. National Australia Bank before the Supreme Court of the United States.

Conway was considered by President Donald Trump for appointment to two positions in the United States Department of Justice—Solicitor General of the United States and Assistant Attorney General heading the Civil Division—but Conway withdrew himself from consideration. In 2018, Conway emerged as a vocal Trump critic while his wife, Kellyanne Conway, worked for Trump from 2016 to 2020. During the 2020 presidential election, Conway was involved with the Lincoln Project, a coalition of former Republicans dedicated to defeating Trump.

He ran in the 2026 Democratic primary to represent New York's 12th district in the U.S. House of Representatives, where he lost the nomination to New York State Assembly member Micah Lasher.

== Early life and education ==
George Conway's father, an electrical engineer, worked for defense contractor Raytheon. His mother was an organic chemist from the Philippines.

Conway grew up outside Boston and graduated from Marlborough High School in Marlborough, Massachusetts. In 1984, Conway graduated magna cum laude from Harvard College with a Bachelor of Arts in biochemistry, where William A. Haseltine served as his faculty advisor. Three years later, he obtained his Juris Doctor from Yale Law School, where he was an editor of the Yale Law Journal and president of the school's Federalist Society chapter.

== Career ==
=== Legal career ===
In 1987 and 1988, Conway served as a law clerk to Judge Ralph K. Winter Jr. of the U.S. Court of Appeals for the Second Circuit. In September 1988, Conway joined the law firm of Wachtell, Lipton, Rosen & Katz. He was named a partner of the firm in the Litigation Department in January 1994 at a million dollars a year. Conway's practice focused on litigation involving securities, mergers and acquisitions, contracts, and antitrust. In 2016, Wachtell Lipton reported $5.8 million in profits per partner.

Conway agreed to work unpaid as one of the attorneys who represented Paula Jones in her lawsuit against U.S. president Bill Clinton. During the representation of Jones, Conway worked closely with Ann Coulter and Matt Drudge.

On March 29, 2010, Conway argued the securities case of Morrison v. National Australia Bank before the U.S. Supreme Court. Conway won the case, which was decided by an 8–0 vote; the opinion was written by Justice Antonin Scalia.

Conway has been considered for some United States Department of Justice posts. In January 2017, he was considered for the post of Solicitor General. The job eventually went to Noel Francisco. On March 17, 2017, it was reported that he would be nominated to run the United States Department of Justice Civil Division. However, on June 2, 2017, Conway announced that he declined to pursue the post. On November 16, 2018, Conway stated that a reason he did not join the Trump administration was because it was "like a shitshow in a dumpster fire".

=== Anti-Trump activism ===
On November 9, 2018, Conway and Neal Katyal wrote an op-ed in The New York Times challenging the constitutionality of Trump's appointment of Matthew Whitaker as acting attorney general following the termination of Jeff Sessions. Trump relied on the Federal Vacancies Reform Act of 1998 (FVRA), which allows the president to make interim appointments, to appoint Whitaker. Conway and Katyal argued that it was a mistake to try to use the FVRA to override the explicit wording of the Constitution, which requires Senate approval of all appointees who answer directly to the president.

In November 2018, Conway organized a group called Checks and Balances. The group was composed of more than a dozen members of the conservative-libertarian Federalist Society, which had been instrumental in selecting candidates for the Trump administration to appoint to federal courts. The New York Times reported that the group was "urging their fellow conservatives to speak up about what they say are the Trump administration's betrayals of bedrock legal norms".

Conway is a founding member and advisor of the Lincoln Project, a conservative Super PAC formed in December 2019 and dedicated to "Defeat President Trump and Trumpism at the ballot box". Its detailed aim is "persuading enough disaffected conservatives, Republicans and Republican-leaning independents in swing states and districts to help ensure a victory in the Electoral College, and congressional majorities that don't enable or abet Mr. Trump's violations of the Constitution". The group released its first video on January 9, 2020; called "The MAGA Church"; it warns evangelicals to beware of false prophets. On August 23, 2020, he announced that he would be taking a leave from the Lincoln Project in order to devote more time to his family. Kellyanne Conway, his wife, announced her departure from the White House the same day as well. In 2021, Conway said that the Lincoln Project should shut down after it was revealed that members of its leadership ignored warnings that another founder was harassing young men, including interns.

Following the first impeachment of Donald Trump, Conway opined in The Washington Post that if the relevant witnesses are not allowed to testify during the Senate Trump impeachment trial, Trump's defenders will be negatively affected by "the very evidence they sought to suppress". Upon Senator Mitch McConnell's refusal to subpoena John Bolton in a Senate impeachment trial, Conway and Neal K. Katyal opined in The New York Times, "There is only one possible explanation for this behavior: [McConnell] is afraid of the truth. Otherwise, what argument can there be for refusing to hear from a central witness like Mr. Bolton, who other witnesses have indicated was exceptionally concerned about the suspension of military aid to Ukraine?"

In April 2024, Conway donated the maximum legal amount of $929,600 to the Biden Victory Fund. When questioned about why he made the donation, Conway told CNN that he believed the election crucial for upholding democracy and the rule of law.

In May 2024, Conway funded a billboard directly on the path from Mar-a-Lago to Doral, where Trump plays golf. The advertisement said "Vote for Joe, not the psycho".

Since 2018, Conway's stated political positions have often been contrary to those taken by his wife on behalf of the Trump administration. His published legal interpretations of Trump's actions differ from his wife's positions, and on Twitter he has been critical of Trump on a personal level. In March 2019, Trump responded to Conway's attacks by calling him a "stone cold LOSER & husband from hell" on Twitter. Trump has called Conway "Deranged loser", "Whack job", "Moon face". Kellyanne defended Trump's comments in an interview, saying that Trump was "a counterpuncher" and was free to respond when he is attacked. Conway has said of Trump: “The lowest form of life on Earth.”

=== House of Representatives ===
In December 2025, Conway made preparations to run for Congress to replace retiring Representative Jerry Nadler in New York's 12th congressional district, which covers most of Midtown Manhattan and Roosevelt Island. He ran as a Democrat. On January 6, 2026, he officially announced the start of his Congressional campaign.

Conway was defeated in his primary bid, getting just 6.1 percent of the vote, while Micah Lasher won with 39 percent. Trump mocked Conway's defeat.

== Media presence ==
Conway occasionally appears in mainstream news media as an expert guest to offer his views mostly on matters involving Donald Trump's legal battles. Beside the national TV networks, he's invited on podcasts in several streaming channels.

In January 2024, Conway and Sarah Longwell started the podcast "George Conway Explains it All (to Sarah Longwell)", published by The Bulwark. Conway left the podcast in December 2025.

== In popular culture ==
In the third season of FX television series Impeachment: American Crime Story, which portrays the Clinton-Lewinsky scandal, George Conway was played by George Salazar.

== Personal life ==
In the late 1990s, Conway dated conservative pundit Laura Ingraham. After he saw Kellyanne Fitzpatrick on the cover of a society magazine, he asked Ann Coulter for an introduction and began dating Fitzpatrick. George and Kellyanne married in 2001. They have four children. The family lived in Alpine, New Jersey, but moved to Washington, D.C., after Trump was elected president.

In 2020, Conway's daughter, Claudia Conway, made a series of anti-Trump comments on TikTok. On July 2, she said that her father approved of her right to free speech and voicing her own opinions.

In March 2023, George and Kellyanne announced they were divorcing after 22 years of marriage. Conway is in a relationship with Ellen Braaten, a child psychologist and professor at Harvard Medical School.

== Selected publications ==
- Conway, George; Katyal, Neal K. (November 8, 2018). "Trump's Appointment of the Acting Attorney General Is Unconstitutional". Opinion. The New York Times.
- Conway, George T. III; Savarese, John F (July 1, 2013). "The Impact of 'Kiobel' Curtailing the Extraterritorial Scope of the Alien Tort Statute" (PDF). Wall Street Lawyer. 17 (7): 3–10.
- Conway, George; Ku, Julian (July 4, 2013). "When Corporate Defendants Go on Offense" (PDF). The Wall Street Journal. p. A11.
- Conway, George (June 11, 2018). "Executive Power: The Terrible Arguments Against the Constitutionality of the Mueller Investigation". Published by Lawfare in cooperation with the Brookings Institution.
