= Fred McChesney =

American legal scholar (1948–2017)

Fred Sanderson McChesney (November 19, 1948 – October 12, 2017) was an American legal scholar known for his contributions to public choice economics. He was the de la Cruz-Mentschikoff Endowed Chair in Law and Economics at the University of Miami and the James B. Haddad Chair Professor of Law at Northwestern University.

== Early life and education ==
McChesney was born on November 19, 1948, in Washington, D.C., and was raised in Montgomery County, Maryland. After finishing high school at Our Lady of Good Counsel High School in 1966, he graduated from the College of the Holy Cross with a Bachelor of Arts, magna cum laude, in history in 1970. He then earned his Juris Doctor (J.D.) from the University of Miami School of Law in 1978 and his Ph.D. in economics from the University of Virginia in 1982. His doctoral dissertation was titled, "Production, promotion and the advertising ban in the legal profession."

== Academic career ==
After receiving his doctorate, McChesney became an official in the Bureau of Consumer Protection of the Federal Trade Commission (FTC) responsible for matters relating to the distribution of cigarettes. He taught at the Emory University School of Law from 1983 to 1997, where he was the Robert T. Thompson Professor of Law and Business and a professor of economics. His work at Emory included research applying economic and public-choice analysis to antitrust law, and in 1995 he and economist William F. Shughart II co-edited The Causes and Consequences of Antitrust: The Public-Choice Perspective for the University of Chicago Press.

McChesney became a professor at Cornell Law School faculty in the fall of 1997 after leaving Emory. That year, Harvard University Press published his book Money for Nothing: Politicians, Rent Extraction, and Political Extortion. In the book, McChesney developed his theory of political "rent extraction", under which private interests may make payments to political actors not to obtain favorable government action but to avoid threatened government action. He remained at Cornell until 1999.

In 1999, McChesney was named the Class of 1967 James B. Haddad Chair at the Northwestern University Pritzker School of Law, a position he held through 2011. He held a concurrent appointment as a professor in the Department of Management and Strategy at Northwestern's Kellogg School of Management. During his time at Northwestern, he also served as director of the university's Executive LL.M. Program in Europe and as director of its Law and Business Program. In 2003, while at Northwestern, McChesney and economist Terry L. Anderson edited Property Rights: Cooperation, Conflict, and Law, a collection examining the economic development and operation of property-rights institutions, for Princeton University Press.

In 2011, McChesney joined the University of Miami School of Law, where he was appointed the Carlos de la Cruz–Soia Mentschikoff Chair in Law and Economics. He was the inaugural holder of the endowed chair.

McChesney's principal teaching and research interests were antitrust law, corporations, and law and economics. Over the course of his academic career, he produced more than 100 books, articles, monographs, and other scholarly works on law, economics, antitrust, and business.

== Selected publications ==
=== Books ===
- McChesney, Fred S.; Shughart, William F., II, eds. (1995). The Causes and Consequences of Antitrust: The Public-Choice Perspective. University of Chicago Press. ISBN 978-0-226-55635-2.
- McChesney, Fred S. (1997). Money for Nothing: Politicians, Rent Extraction, and Political Extortion. Harvard University Press. ISBN 978-0-674-58330-6.
- Goetz, Charles J.; McChesney, Fred S. (1998). Antitrust Law: Interpretation and Implementation. Michie/Lexis. ISBN 978-1-55834-860-8.
- McChesney, Fred S., ed. (1998). Economic Inputs, Legal Outputs: The Role of Economists in Modern Antitrust. John Wiley & Sons. ISBN 978-0-471-97074-3.
- Anderson, Terry L.; McChesney, Fred S., eds. (2003). Property Rights: Cooperation, Conflict, and Law. Princeton University Press. ISBN 978-0-691-09998-9.
- Manne, Henry G. (2010). McChesney, Fred S. (ed.). The Collected Works of Henry G. Manne (3-volume set ed.). Liberty Fund. ISBN 978-0-86597-763-1.
