= Bootleggers and Baptists =

Economic concept

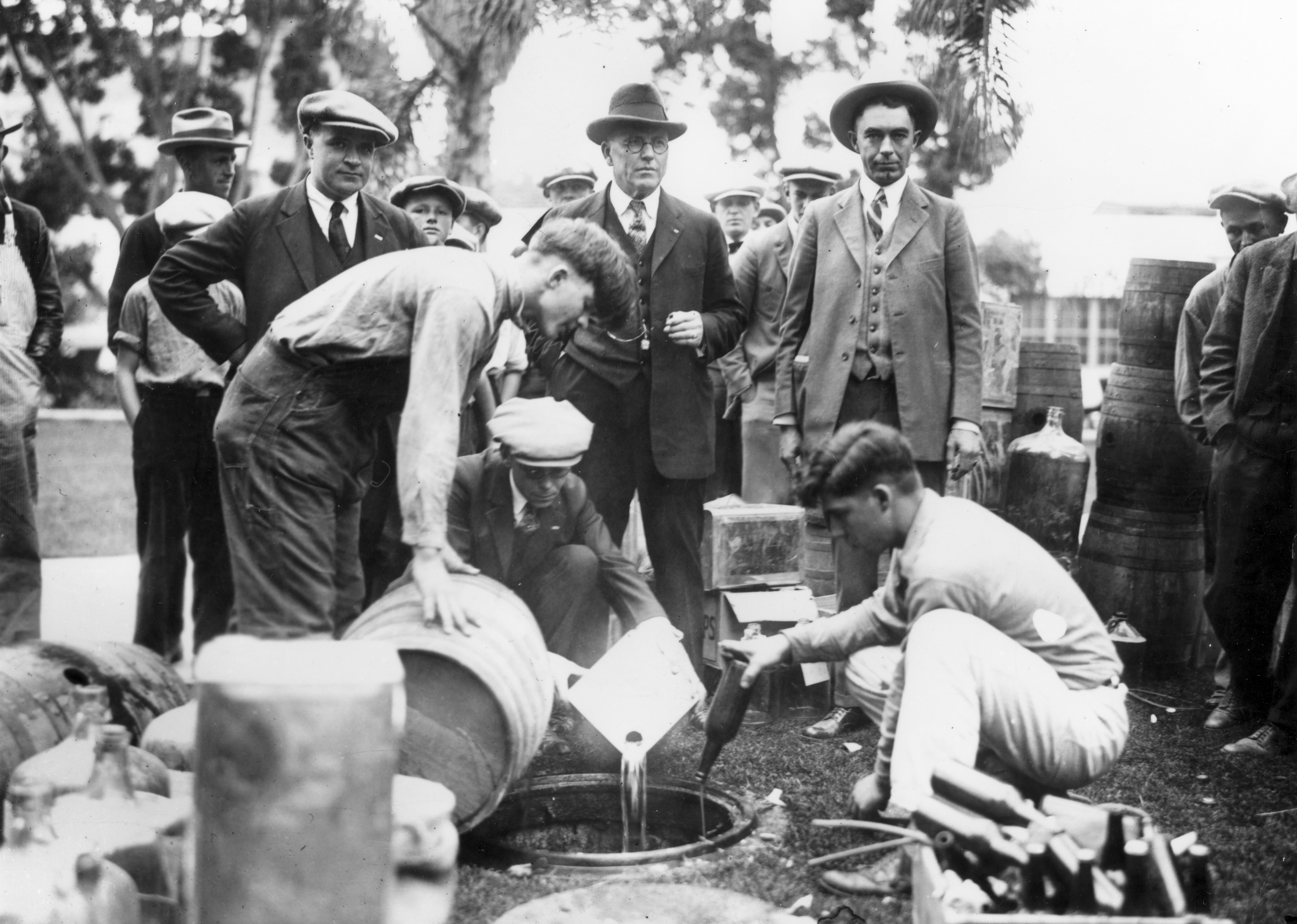
Californian police agents dump illegal alcohol in 1925, prohibition-era photo courtesy Orange County Archives.

Bootleggers and Baptists is a concept put forth by regulatory economist Bruce Yandle, derived from the observation that regulations are supported both by groups that want the ostensible purpose of the regulation, and by groups that profit from undermining that purpose.

For much of the 20th century, Baptists and other evangelical Christians were prominent in political activism for Sunday closing laws restricting the sale of alcohol. Bootleggers sold alcohol illegally, and got more business if legal sales were restricted. Yandle wrote that "Such a coalition makes it easier for politicians to favor both groups. ... the Baptists lower the costs of favor-seeking for the bootleggers, because politicians can pose as being motivated purely by the public interest even while they promote the interests of well-funded businesses. ... [Baptists] take the moral high ground, while the bootleggers persuade the politicians quietly, behind closed doors."

== Economic theory ==
The mainstream economic theory of regulation treats politicians and administrators as brokers among interest groups. Bootleggers and Baptists is a specific idea in the subfield of regulatory economics that attempts to predict which interest groups will succeed in obtaining rules they favor. It holds that coalitions of opposing interests that can agree on a common rule will be more successful than one-sided groups.

1. Baptists do not merely agitate for legislation, they help monitor and enforce it (a law against Sunday alcohol sales without significant public support would likely be ignored, or be evaded through bribery of enforcement officers). Thus, bootleggers and Baptists is not just an academic restatement of the common political accusation that shadowy for-profit interests are hiding behind public-interest groups to fund deceptive legislation. It is a rational theory to explain relative success among types of coalitions.

Another part of the theory is that bootleggers and Baptists produce suboptimal legislation. Although both groups are satisfied with the outcome, broader society would be better off either with no legislation or different legislation. For example, a surtax on Sunday alcohol sales could reduce Sunday alcohol consumption as much as making it illegal. Instead of enriching bootleggers and imposing policing costs, the surtax could raise money to be spent on, say, property tax exemptions for churches and alcoholism treatment programs. Moreover, such a program could be balanced to reflect the religious beliefs and drinking habits of everyone, not just certain groups. From the religious point of the view, the bootleggers have not been cut out of the deal, the government has become the bootlegger.

Although the bootleggers and Baptists story has become a standard idea in regulatory economics, it has not been systematically validated as an empirical proposition. It is a catch-phrase useful in analyzing regulatory coalitions rather than an accepted principle of economics.

=== Types of interactions ===
In their 2014 book, Adam Smith (not to be confused with Scottish economist and philosopher Adam Smith) and Yandle expanded the original concept into four empirically distinguishable patterns of bootlegger-baptist interactions;

1. Covert pattern, where no organized moral constituency exists, and economic interests advance their aims by adopting the moral framing and rhetoric normally associated with baptists.
2. Noncooperative pattern, where bootleggers and baptists pursue the same regulatory objective independently.
3. Cooperative pattern, where bootleggers provide direct support, such as funding or platform, to baptist organizations whose advocacy gives legitimacy to the shared regulatory outcome.
4. Coordinated pattern, considered to be the most complex of the four, it is when political actors deliberately assemble the coalition for large-scale regulatory arrangements.

Smith and Yandle present the Affordable Care Act as a leading example of the coordinated dynamic, arguing that its design was supported by large retailers, insurers, and healthcare providers alongside advocates of the act in public interest.

== Examples ==
1) In 2015, liquor stores in the "wet counties" of Arkansas allied with local religious leaders to oppose statewide legalization of alcohol sales. Where the religious groups were opposed on moral grounds, the liquor stores were concerned over the potential loss of customers if rival stores were permitted to open in the "dry" counties of the state.

2) Willie Morris, the editor of Harper's Magazine in the 1960s, published a memoir of growing up in Mississippi. He wrote:

Mississippi was a dry state, one of the last in America, but its dryness was merely academic, a gesture to the preachers and the churches. My father would say that the only difference between Mississippi and its neighbor Tennessee, which was wet, was that in Tennessee a man could not buy liquor on Sunday. The Mississippi bootleggers, who theoretically operated "grocery stores," with ten or twelve cans of sardines and a few boxes of crackers for sale, stayed open at all hours, and would sell to anyone regardless of age or race. My father could work himself into a mild frenzy talking about this state of affairs; Mississippi, he would say, was the poorest state in the union, and in some ways the worst, and here it was depriving itself of tax money because the people who listened to the preachers did not have the common sense to understand what was going on. Every so often there would be a vote to determine whether liquor should be made legal. Then, for weeks before, the town would be filled with feverish campaign activity. People would quote the old saying, "As long as the people of Mississippi can stagger to the polls, they'll vote dry." A handful of people would come right out and say that liquor should be made legal, so that the bootleggers and the sheriffs would not be able to make all the money, and because the state legislature's "black-market tax" on whiskey, a pittance of a tax that actually contradicted the state constitution, was a shameful deceit. But these voices were few, and most of the campaigning was done by the preachers and the church groups. In their sermons the preachers would talk about the dangers of alcoholism, and the shame of all the liquor ads along the highways in Tennessee and Louisiana, and the temptations this offered the young people. Two or three weeks before the vote, the churches would hand out bumper stickers to put on cars; in big red letters they said, "For the sake of my family, vote dry." An older boy, the son of one of the most prosperous bootleggers, drove around town in a new Buick, with three of those bumper stickers plastered on front and back: "For the sake of my family, vote dry."

— Morris, Willie, North Toward Home (1967)

== Other applications ==
Bootleggers and Baptists has been invoked to explain nearly every political alliance for regulation in the United States in the last 30 years including the Clean Air Act, interstate trucking, state liquor stores, the Pure Food and Drug Act, environmental policy, regulation of genetically modified organisms, the North American Free Trade Agreement, environmental politics, gambling legislation, blood donation, wine regulation, and the tobacco settlement.

Legislation and treaties to reduce global warming often command support of both polluting countries and environmentalists. Yandle and Buck argue that a similar phenomenon took place in the battle over the Kyoto Protocol, where the "Baptist" environmental groups provided moral support while "bootlegger" corporations and nations worked in the background to seek economic advantages over their rivals.

== See also ==
- Crony capitalism
- Moonshine
- Regulatory capture
- Rum-running
