= Free-market environmentalism =

Political and economic philosophy

Free-market environmentalism is a type of environmentalism that argues that the free market, property rights, and tort law provide the best means of preserving the environment, internalizing pollution costs, and conserving resources. Free-market environmentalists therefore argue that the best way to protect the environment is to clarify and protect property rights. This allows parties to negotiate improvements in environmental quality. It also allows them to use torts to stop environmental harm. If affected parties can compel polluters to compensate them they will reduce or eliminate the externality.

Market proponents advocate changes to the legal system that empower affected parties to obtain such compensation. They further claim that governments have limited affected parties' ability to do so by complicating the tort system to benefit producers over others.

== Tenets ==
While environmental problems may be viewed as market failures, free market environmentalists argue that environmental problems arise because:

1. The state encodes, provides and enforces laws which override or obscure property rights and thus fail to protect them adequately.
2. Given the technological and legal context in which people operate, transaction costs are too high to allow parties to negotiate to a solution better for the environment.
3. Laws governing class or individual tort claims provide polluters with immunity from tort claims, or interfere with those claims in such a way as to make it difficult to legally sustain them.

Though many environmentalists blame markets for many of today's environmental problems, free-market environmentalists blame many of these problems on distortions of the market and the lack of markets. Government actions are blamed for a number of environmental detriments.

- A misunderstanding of the tragedy of the commons, which is seen as a fundamental problem for the environment. When land is held in common, anybody may use it. Since resources are consumable, this creates the incentive for entrepreneurs to use common resources before somebody else does. Many environmental resources are held by the government or in common, such as air, water, forests. A claimed problem with regulation is that it puts property into a political commons, where individuals try to appropriate public resources for their own gain, a phenomenon called rent-seeking.
- Tenure – Renters do not benefit from value accrued during their tenure and thus face an incentive to extract as much value as possible without conservation.
- Political allocation – Political information does not have the incentives that markets do to seek superior information (profit and loss). Though many participants provide input to governments, they can only make one decision. This means that governments create rules that are not well crafted for local situations. The government's strategy is that of anticipation, to hide from danger through regulations. A healthier society would use resilience, facing and overcoming risks.
- Perverse subsidies – Governments offer cross subsidies that distort price systems. This means that underconsumers and overconsumers are paying the same rates, so the underconsumer is overpaying and the overconsumer is underpaying. The incentive leads to more overconsumers and fewer underconsumers.
- Increased transaction costs – Governments may create rules that make it difficult to transfer rights in ways that benefit the environment. For example, in the western United States, many states have laws over water rights that make it difficult for environmental groups to purchase in-stream flows from farmers.

== Market tools ==
Markets are not perfect, and free-market environmentalists assert that market-based solutions will have their mistakes. Through strong feedback mechanisms such as risk, profit and loss, market-driven have strong incentives to learn from mistakes.

- Individual choice – Consumers have the incentive to maximize their satisfaction and try to find low cost, high value options. Markets allocate resources to the highest bidder. Producers make purchases on behalf of the consumer. Due to many actors in the market, there is no one-size-fits-all solution and entrepreneurs will seek to fulfill many values of society, including conservation.
- Entrepreneurship – Entrepreneurs seek value, problem-solve, and coordinate resources.
- Price system – When resources become scarce, prices rise. Rising prices incentivize entrepreneurs to find substitutions for these resources. These resources are often conserved. E.g. as prices for coal rise, consumers will use less and higher prices will drive substitution for different energy sources.
- Property rights – Owners face a strong incentive to take care of and protect their property. They must decide how much to use today and how much to use tomorrow. Everybody is trying to grow value. Corporate value and share price is based on their anticipated future profits. Owners with the possibility of transferring their property, either to an heir or through sale want their property to grow in value. Property rights encourage conservation and defend resources against depletion, since there is a strong incentive to maximize the value of the resource for the future.
- Common law – In order to have working property rights, you need a good system to defend them. When rights are weak, people will violate them. By creating a strong system, where common resources can be homesteaded, transferred, and defended against harm, resources can be protected, managed, allocated with the results that aggregate and balance humanity's needs and wants.

The market is a non-political allocation device. Many environmentalists proposals call to return resources from markets to become political problems.

== Ideological spectrum ==
=== Coasian bargaining ===
Some economists argue that, if industries internalized the costs of negative externalities, they would face an incentive to reduce them, perhaps even becoming enthusiastic about taking advantage of opportunities to improve profitability through lower costs. Moreover, economists claim this would lead to the optimal balance between the marginal benefits of pursuing an activity and the marginal cost of its environmental consequences. One well-known means of internalizing a negative consequence is to establish a property right over some phenomenon formerly in the public domain.

The Coase theorem is one extreme version of this logic. If property rights are well defined and if there are no transaction costs, then market participants can negotiate to a solution that internalizes the externality. Moreover, this solution will not depend on who is allocated the property right. For example, a paper mill and a resort might be on the same lake. Suppose the benefits to the resort of a clean lake outweigh the benefits to the mill of being able to pollute. If the mill has the right to pollute, the resort will pay it not to. If the resort has the right to a pollution-free lake, it will keep that right, as the mill will be unable to compensate it for its pollution. However, critics have charged that the "theorem" attributed to Coase is of extremely limited practicability because of its assumptions, including no transaction costs, and is ill-suited to real world externalities which have high bargaining costs due to many factors.

More generally, free-market environmentalists argue that transaction costs "count" as real costs. If the cost of re-allocating property rights exceeds the benefits of doing so, then it is actually optimal to stay in the status quo. This means the initial allocation of property rights is not neutral and also that it has important implications for efficiency. Nevertheless, given the existing property rights regime, costly changes to it are not necessarily efficient, even if in hindsight an alternative regime would have been better. But if there are opportunities for property rights to evolve, entrepreneurs can find them to create new wealth.

=== Geolibertarianism ===
Libertarian Georgists (or Geolibertarians) maintain a strong essential commitment to free markets but reject the Coasian solution in favor of land value taxation, wherein the economic rent of land is collected by the community and either equally distributed to adult residents in the form of universal basic income, called the citizen's dividend, or used to fund necessary functions of a minimal government. Under the LVT system, only landholders are taxed and on the basis of the market value of the earth in its unimproved state, that is to say, apart from the value of any structures or products of human labor. Geolibertarians regard the LVT as just compensation for a legal land title granting exclusive access to that which logically precedes and generates private capital, whose supply is inelastic, which properly belongs to all, and to which all have an equal right because it is vital to human existence and economic activity—the ground itself—and thus consider land value capture both morally imperative and a natural source of revenue.

Taxation of land values has been advocated by many classical economists and theorists of classical liberalism, but this approach was popularized as the Single Tax by political economist and public intellectual Henry George in the late 19th century. Geolibertarians generally also support Pigouvian taxes on pollution and fees as compensation for natural resource extraction, negative externalities which adversely affect land values in particular. Many argue the monopolization of land promotes idle land speculation, real estate bubbles, urban sprawl and artificially severe wealth inequality, while violating the Lockean proviso and denying others rightful access to the earth.

=== Anarcho-capitalism ===
Rothbardian anarcho-capitalists also reject the proposed Coasian solution as making invalid assumptions about the purely subjective notion of costs being measurable in monetary terms, and also of making unexamined and invalid value judgments (i.e., ethical judgments). (Wayback Machine PDF) The Rothbardians' solution is to recognize individuals' Lockean property rights, of which the Rothbardians maintain that Wertfreiheit (i.e., value-free) economic analysis demonstrates that this arrangement necessarily maximizes social utility. (Toward a Reconstruction of Utility and Welfare Economics PDF)

Murray Rothbard himself believed the term "free-market environmentalism" to be oxymoronic. On his view the unimproved natural environment, undeveloped and unowned, can in no sense be considered property until it is transformed via Lockean homesteading. Unlike geolibertarians and many classical liberals, however, Rothbard emphatically rejected Locke's proviso as inconsistent with his theory of property acquisition. Against environmentalism Rothbard said: "The problem is that environmentalists are not interested in efficiency or preserving private property....The environmentalists are acolytes and prisoners of a monstrous literally anti-human philosophy. They despise and condemn the human race, which by its very nature and in contrast to other creatures, changes and transforms the environment instead of being passively subjected to it....I have come to the conclusion that a 'free-market environmentalist' is an oxymoron. Scratch one and you get...an environmentalist."

=== Markets and ecosystems as spontaneous orders ===
Recent arguments in the academic literature have used Friedrich Hayek's concept of a spontaneous order to defend a broadly non-interventionist environmental policy. Hayek originally used the concept of a spontaneous order to argue against government intervention in the market. Like the market, ecosystems contain complex networks of information, involve an ongoing dynamic process, contain orders within orders, and the entire system operates without being directed by a conscious mind. On this analysis, species takes the place of price as a visible element of the system formed by a complex set of largely unknowable elements. Human ignorance about the countless interactions between the organisms of an ecosystem limits our ability to manipulate nature. Since humans rely on the ecosystem to sustain themselves, it is argued that we have an obligation to not disrupt such systems. This analysis of ecosystems as spontaneous orders does not rely on markets qualifying as spontaneous orders. As such, one need not endorse Hayek's analysis of markets to endorse ecosystems as spontaneous orders.

== Examples ==
Proponents of free-market environmentalism use the example of the recent destruction of the once prosperous Grand Banks fishery off Newfoundland. Once one of the world's most abundant fisheries, it has been almost completely depleted of fish. Those primarily responsible were large "factory-fishing" enterprises driven by the imperative to realize profits in a competitive global market. It is contended that if the fishery had been owned by a single entity, the owner would have had an interest in keeping a renewable supply of fish to maintain profits over the long term. The owner would thus have charged high fees to fish in the area, sharply reducing how many fish were caught. The owner also would have closely enforced rules on not catching young fish. Instead commercial ships from around the world raced to get the fish out of the water before competitors could, including catching fish that had not yet reproduced.

Another example is in the 19th century early gold miners in California developed a trade in rights to draw from water courses based on the doctrine of prior appropriation. This was curtailed in 1902 by the Newlands Reclamation Act which introduced subsidies for irrigation projects. This had the effect of sending a signal to farmers that water was inexpensive and abundant, leading to uneconomic use of a scarce resource. Increasing difficulties in meeting demand for water in the western United States have been blamed on the continuing establishment of governmental control and a return to tradable property rights has been proposed.

Supporters and participants in certain environmental management programs have argued that landowners are incentivized to ensure the restoration and upkeep of their land. In southern African countries such as Namibia, South Africa, and Zimbabwe privatization has led to a boom in wildlife tourism and double digit percentage gains for the population of wildlife species. For example, Namibia's private conservation lands saw an 80% increase in their wildlife populations. For cattle ranchers in Zimbabwe mixed populations of cattle and wild game were found to be more economically viable and ecologically friendly than ranchers who solely had land for cattle. In South Africa, ranches have been found to have better wildlife richness compared to state run areas and serve as a rare example where native herbivores are thriving.

== Notable free-market environmentalists ==
- Terry L. Anderson
- Jonathan H. Adler
- John Baden
- Ralph Borsodi
- John Curtis
- Bolton Hall
- Laura Jones (Fraser Institute)
- Robert F. Kennedy Jr.
- Gary Libecap
- Preston Manning
- Bruce Yandle

== Notable free-market environmentalist groups ==
Organizations support free-market environmentalism:

- Property and Environment Research Center (PERC) (United States)

== Criticisms ==
Critics argue that free-market environmentalists have no method of dealing with collective problems like environmental degradation and natural resource depletion because of their rejection of collective regulation and control. They see natural resources as too difficult to privatize (e.g. water), as well as legal responsibility for pollution and degrading biodiversity as too hard to trace.

== See also ==
- Eco-capitalism
- Ecological economics
- Enviro-Capitalists: Doing Good While Doing Well
- Environmental economics
- Foundation for Research on Economics and the Environment
- Green conservatism
- Green economy
- Green libertarianism
- Ecotax
- Natural capitalism
- Natural resource economics
- Physiocracy
- Property rights (economics)
- Waterkeeper Alliance
- Wise use

== Bibliography ==
- Anderson, T L & Leal, D R (2001) Free-market environmentalism, 2nd ed., ISBN 0312235038
- Grundfest, J.A. (1992). "The limited future of unlimited liability: a capital markets perspective". Yale Law Journal. 102 (2). The Yale Law Journal, Vol. 102, No. 2: 387–425. doi:10.2307/796841. JSTOR 796841.
- Hahnel, R. (2005). Economic Justice And Democracy: From Competition To Cooperation. Routledge. ISBN 0415933455.
- Hansmann, H.; Kraakman, R. (1991). "Toward unlimited shareholder liability for corporate torts". Yale Law Journal. 100 (7). The Yale Law Journal, Vol. 100, No. 7: 1879–1934. doi:10.2307/796812. JSTOR 796812.
- Stroup, Richard L. (2003) Eco-nomics: What Everyone Should Know About Economics and the Environment ISBN 1930865449
- Krugman, Paul (1999) "Earth in the balance sheet: economists go for the green" and "Taxes and traffic jams" reprinted in The Accidental Theorist ISBN 0140286861
- Ridley, M & Low, B S (1993) "Can selfishness save the environment?", The Atlantic Monthly vol. 272, pp. 76–86
- Simon, Julian (1998) The Ultimate Resource 2 ISBN 0691003815
