= Todd Zywicki =

American lawyer, legal scholar and educator

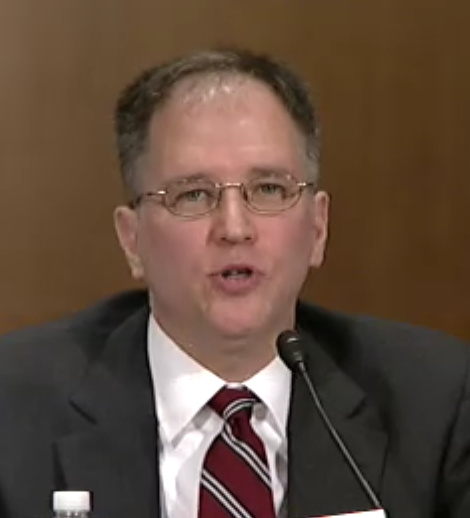
- Born: Todd Joseph Zywicki; January 18, 1966 (age 60); Pennsylvania, U.S.
- Education: Dartmouth College (BA); Clemson University (MA); University of Virginia (JD)
- Occupations: Lawyer; legal scholar
- Relatives: Tammy Zywicki (sister)
- Website: www.law.gmu.edu/faculty/directory/fulltime/zywicki_todd

Todd Joseph Zywicki (born January 18, 1966) is an American lawyer, legal scholar and educator. He is a George Mason University Foundation Professor of Law at the Antonin Scalia Law School, where he teaches in the areas of bankruptcy and contracts.

== Biography ==
Zywicki was born in Pennsylvania in 1966. Zywicki graduated from East Side High School in Greenville, South Carolina in 1984. Zywicki attended Dartmouth College, graduating in 1988 with a Bachelor of Arts degree cum Laude with High Honors in U.S. Government. At Dartmouth, he was a member of Zeta Psi fraternity. Zywicki attended Clemson University, graduating in 1990 with a Master of Arts degree in economics. Zywicki attended University of Virginia School of Law graduating in 1993 with a Juris Doctor. While Zywicki was attending Law School, his younger sister, Tammy, was brutally murdered. After last being seen alive in Illinois, her body was found in Missouri.

Prior to teaching at George Mason University, Zywicki taught at the Mississippi College School of Law, where he held a faculty position from 1996 to 1998. Zywicki was a visiting professor of law at Vanderbilt University Law School for the Fall 2007 Semester, Georgetown University Law Center for the 2004–05 academic year, and a visiting professor at Boston College in 2002. During the 2003–04 academic year, he served as the director of the Office of Policy Planning at the Federal Trade Commission, in which capacity he testified before the United States House of Representatives Subcommittee on Commerce, Trade, and Consumer Protection regarding reform issues.

== Memberships and affiliations ==
Zywicki is a member of the board of directors of the Bill of Rights Institute, and the governing board of the Financial Services Research Program at The George Washington University School of Business. He is chair of the academic advisory council of the Bill of Rights Institute, the McCormick Tribune Freedom Museum in Chicago as well as the forthcoming film, "We The People in IMAX". He serves on the advisory council for the Financial Services Research Program at The George Washington University School of Business, the executive committee for the Federalist Society's Financial Institutions and E-Commerce Practice Group, the advisory council of the Competitive Enterprise Institute, the Program Advisory Board of the Foundation for Research on Economics and the Environment, and the Board of Visitors of Ralston College.

Zywicki is also a senior fellow of the James Buchanan Center for Political Economy Program on Philosophy, Politics, and Economics at George Mason University, a senior fellow of the Goldwater Institute, a senior scholar of the Mercatus Center at George Mason University, and a fellow of the International Centre for Economic Research in Turin, Italy. During the Fall 2008 Semester, Professor Zywicki was the Searle Fellow of the George Mason University School of Law and was a 2008–09 W. Glenn Campbell and Rita Ricardo-Campbell National Fellow and the Arch W. Shaw National Fellow at the Hoover Institution on War, Revolution and Peace at Stanford University. He has lectured and consulted with government officials around the world, including Iceland, Italy, Japan, and Guatemala. In 2006, Zywicki was a member of the United States Department of Justice Study Group on "Identifying Fraud, Abuse and Errors in the United States Bankruptcy System". He was on the Board of Trustees of Dartmouth College from 2005 to 2009. Zywicki was a trustee of Yorktown University, a defunct conservative for-profit online university.

== Legal scholarship and activities ==
Zywicki has testified on numerous occasions in his personal capacity before committees and subcommittees of the United States Senate and United States House of Representatives on issues of bankruptcy and consumer credit. In 2005, he wrote at The Volokh Conspiracy that "the growth in subprime lending is not creating overwhelming debt burdens for low-income households."

During the run-up to the Bankruptcy Abuse Prevention and Consumer Protection Act (BAPCPA), a law that was heavily lobbied for by the financial services industry and that made it more difficult for consumers to discharge their credit card debts in bankruptcy, Professor Zywicki testified before Congress that the law was likely to reduce the costs of debt to all borrowers by reducing losses to credit card lenders:

[W]hen creditors are unable to collect debts because of bankruptcy, some of those losses are inevitably passed on to responsible Americans who live up to their financial obligations. . . . We all pay for bankruptcy abuse in higher down payments, higher interest rates, and higher costs for goods and services.

This bankruptcy 'tax' takes many forms. It is obviously reflected in higher interest rates.... It is [also] reflected in shorter grace periods for paying bills and higher penalty fees and late-charges for those who miss payments ... [R]educing the number of strategic bankruptcies will reduce the bankruptcy tax paid by every American family .... These reforms will make the bankruptcy system more fair, equitable, and efficient, not only for bankruptcy debtors and creditors, but for all Americans.

In his scholarly and popular writing, Professor Zywicki continues to write about issues that are of concern to the credit card industry, continues to suggest that the industry is price-competitive, and continues to argue that the interests of the credit card industry are closely aligned with those of its customers. He has recently argued against efforts to regulate the fees that credit card payment networks charge to merchants, saying that such regulation will harm consumers because credit card companies will try to recover the lost revenue from them. Professor Zywicki's positions have been challenged by financial engineers and legal scholars, including an economist whose work he has cited.

Zywicki has been editor of the Supreme Court Economic Review since 2006. He previously served as editor from 2001 to 2002. The Supreme Court Economic Review is ranked second among all law and economics journals in citation impact studies.

Zywicki clerked for Judge Jerry Edwin Smith of the U.S. Court of Appeals for the Fifth Circuit and worked as an associate at Alston & Bird in Atlanta, Georgia, where he practiced bankruptcy law. While attending law school, he was executive editor of the Virginia Tax Review and John M. Olin Scholar in Law and Economics.

Zywicki was a leading supporter of the Bankruptcy Abuse Prevention and Consumer Protection Act, which was enacted in 2005 with substantial bipartisan majorities in both houses of Congress. One judge faced with interpreting the law stated that one section was "one of many examples of poor drafting in the new bankruptcy law, which Professor Todd Zywicki assured the Senate Judiciary Committee was 'fine as it is,' adding, 'There is no word that I would change in this particular piece of legislation.'" In re Kane, 336 B.R. 477 (Bkrtcy. D. Nev. 2006). Zywicki responded that the quote was taken out of context, saying his comment referred to whether the bill had become obsolete after having been drafted eight years earlier, and not to whether it had technical glitches.

Zywicki is the author of more than 50 articles in law reviews and economics journals. He is a frequent commentator in print and broadcast media and a regular contributor to The Volokh Conspiracy blog. He is a frequent contributor to the media. In a column in The Wall Street Journal in December 2008, Zywicki criticized proposals to bail out the American auto industry, arguing that they should file Chapter 11 instead. In a column in The Wall Street Journal in February 2009, Zywicki criticized proposals to permit bankruptcy judges to modify mortgage contracts. He has also appeared frequently on television and radio.

Zywicki has been a prominent critic of the Consumer Financial Protection Bureau and Senator Elizabeth Warren, who had promoted the creation of the agency.

On August 3, 2021, Zywicki sued George Mason University over the university's COVID-19 vaccine and mask requirements, arguing that his natural immunity from a prior infection was sufficient in lieu of vaccination. He dropped the lawsuit after the university granted him a medical exemption.

He has also worked for the Global Economics Group since 2009 in the area of financial regulation.

In 2023, Zywicki filed an expert declaration for the defense in the prosecution of the fake Georgia Trump electors, arguing that the electors had "acted in a responsible, proper and lawful manner." Zywicki argued that the electors were following the precedent of the Kennedy electors in the 1960 presidential election, who met and sent their votes to the Electoral College after Richard Nixon had been declared the winner but while a recount was pending.
