= Society for the Rule of Law =

American political-legal advocacy group

The Society for the Rule of Law is a group of conservative and libertarian attorneys that was formed in opposition to President Donald Trump's behavior regarding the Justice Department and the news media. The organization describes itself as "dedicated to defending the Constitution and the Rule of Law." Founded in November 2018 by George Conway under the name Checks and Balances, it is composed of some members of the conservative-libertarian Federalist Society, which had assisted the Trump administration in selecting appointees for federal courts; charter members of the new organization included, Tom Ridge, Peter Keisler, Jonathan H. Adler, Orin Kerr, Lori S. Meyer, Paul McNulty, Phillip D. Brady, John B. Bellinger III, Carrie Cordero, Marisa C. Maleck, Alan Charles Raul, and Paul Rosenzweig, amongst others.

Organization member Keisler said the group had received an "overwhelmingly positive response", including from Federalist Society members, however, the formation of the group was sharply criticized by Federalist Society leader Leonard Leo, saying he found "the underlying premise of the group rather offensive".

On October 10, 2019, the group released a statement offering its legal reasoning for an "expeditious" impeachment probe into President Trump. Citing the Special Counsel's report, which highlights that the "Trump 2016 campaign was open to and enthusiastic about receiving Russian government-facilitated assistance to gain an advantage in the previous election", it outlined the recent facts regarding Trump's attempts to put pressure on Ukraine for his personal and political benefit. After the statement by Checks and Balances was published, organization member George Conway said that the White House letter (reported by the Daily Beast as mostly written by Trump), refusing to cooperate in the House of Representatives impeachment hearings, was "trash".

In November 2023, an opinion piece in The New York Times by George Conway, J. Michael Luttig, and Barbara Comstock announced that Checks and Balances had changed its name to The Society for the Rule of Law.

== See also ==
- Impeachment trial of Donald Trump following Impeachment inquiry against Donald Trump
- Timeline of Russian interference in the 2016 United States elections
- Timeline of Russian interference in the 2016 United States elections (July 2016 – election day)
- Never Trump Movement
