= Clark Perry Baldwin =

American serial killer

- Born: August 22, 1961; Charles City, Iowa, U.S.
- Died: July 18, 2025 (aged 63); Tennessee, U.S.
- Conviction: First degree murder
- Penalty: Life imprisonment

Details
- Victims: 3+
- Span of crimes: 1991–1992
- Country: United States
- States: Tennessee, Wyoming
- Date apprehended: May 6, 2020

Clark Perry Baldwin (August 22, 1961 – July 18, 2025) was an American serial killer who was linked via DNA to the murders of at least three women in Wyoming and Tennessee committed between 1991 and 1992.

After multiple delays, he was charged and convicted of the Tennessee murder, for which he was sentenced to life imprisonment. Prior to his extradition to Wyoming, Baldwin died from a heart attack.

== Early life ==
Clark Perry Baldwin was born on August 22, 1961, in Charles City, Iowa, to Lawrence and Betty Baldwin, both of whom were described as loving parents. In the early 1970s, the family moved to Nashua, Iowa, where Baldwin attended the Nashua-Plainfield Junior-Senior High School, graduating in 1979.

Following his graduation, Baldwin got a job as a truck driver for a company called Marten Transport. During this time, he traveled across multiple states and spent most of his free time in the company of prostitutes and pimps. In the mid-1980s, he got married, but continued to have intimate relations with other women. In 1988, one of the women gave birth to a daughter, but Baldwin's paternity was only confirmed in 2018.

Over the years, Baldwin lived in several cities, predominantly in Nashua, Waterloo and Springfield, Missouri.

=== Crimes and life prior to arrest ===
Baldwin's first confirmed crimes began in the early 1990s, when he started behaving aggressively towards women and prostitutes in particular. In February 1991, he was arrested for raping a 21-year-old hitchhiker named Mary Ann Newton in Wheeler County, Texas. After putting her in his truck, Baldwin threatened her with a gun, tied her mouth and legs, then beat, raped and tried to strangle her. However, Newton fought back fiercely, culminating in Baldwin releasing her of the restraints and offering to let her go. According to Newton, her assailant then gave her a handgun and offered her to shoot him, but she instead demanded that he let her go at the next possible opportunity. Baldwin then drove along until Newton stopped him at a gas station, threw the handgun back into the truck and called the police. Baldwin was interviewed concerning the incident, but the charges were eventually dismissed.

In 1997, Baldwin and two accomplices were arrested in Springfield, Missouri, for counterfeiting currency on his personal computer. He was convicted of this crime and spent 18 months in prison. After his release in September 1999, Baldwin returned to his parents' home in Nashua.

In the mid-2000s, Baldwin quit his job as a truck driver and started a business for manufacturing and selling candles. In 2008, a fire destroyed the building and damanged two neighboring ones, but the exact cause of the fire was never established. After this, Baldwin moved to Waterloo, where he made a living from low-skilled labor. Immediately prior to his arrest, he was unemployed and had financial difficulties, but was not known to exhibit any threatening behavior against others.

== Murders ==
On May 6, 2020, Baldwin was arrested at his home in Waterloo on several charges of murder. With the help of DNA testing, authorities linked him to three murders: 32-year-old Pamela Rose Aldridge McCall and two women whose identities were unknown at the time and were referred to as "Bitter Creek Betty" and "Sheridan County Jane Doe".

On March 10, 1991, McCall's body was found on the side of the I-65 near Spring Hill, Tennessee, about 30 kilometers south of Nashville. She had been raped and strangled. During the investigation of her murder, investigators found traces of semen on her pantyhose while examining the crime scene. At the time of her death, McCall was five months pregnant.

On March 1, 1992, the body of "Bitter Creek Betty" was found lying face down in the eponymous Bitter Creek rest stop on the west side of the I-80, approximately 40 kilometers east of Rock Springs, Wyoming. She was completely naked, but investigators found the victim's underwear and sweatpants nearby. She was wearing a gold wedding ring on one the ring finger of her left hand and a solid gold necklace around her neck. She also had a distinctive tattoo on her right breast, depicting a rose with stem and leaves. During the post-mortem examination, the coroner noted signs of strangulation, injuries to the face and jaw, as well as signs of sexual assault. He found it difficult to determine the time of death, stating that the woman could have been killed elsewhere and that the body could have been dumped at the crime scene between October 1991 and February 1992.

In April 1992, the body of the "Sheridan County Jane Doe", was found on the side of the I-90, approximately 5 kilometers south of the Wyoming-Montana border. She was found fully clothed, except for her socks and shoes. At the time of her death, she was approximately three months pregnant.

Initially, the murders were considered unrelated, but in 2012, DNA testing of the semen traces confirmed that the two Jane Does were killed by the same perpetrator. In April 2019, that same DNA linked them to the murder of Pamela McCall.

== Surveillance ==
Baldwin became a suspect in late 2019, after genealogists used public genetic genealogy websites to discover a match between the genotypic profile of an Iowa resident and that of the perpetrator. The circle of suspects was narrowed down to several people, all of whom were relatives of Baldwin. In early 2020, after investigators established his whereabouts, they monitored him for several days, collecting garbage bags he threw out in the trash.

After analyzing the scraps of food, they obtained a sample of his saliva and extracted DNA from it. In the spring of 2020, using DNA testing, Baldiwn was conclusively linked to the three murders and subsequently arrested.

== Trial, identification of victims, and death ==
Following his arrest, officials from both Tennessee and Wyoming held a meeting to determine where he would stand trial first, with the final conclusion being that Baldwin would first be extradited to Tennessee and then to Wyoming. However, the trial was delayed multiple times due to the COVID-19 pandemic, delaying his trial until early 2025.

In May 2022, "Bitter Creek Betty" was positively identified as a woman named Irene Vasquez, who was declared missing in 1990.

On May 2, 2025, a jury convicted Baldwin of murdering Pamela McCall and sentenced him to life imprisonment, after which he was detained at the Maury County Jail to await extradition to Wyoming. On July 17, authorities identified the Sheridan County Jane Doe as 21-year-old Cindi Arleen Estrada, a native of Torrance, California.

On the day after Estrada's identification, Baldwin died at a hospital in Tennessee due to complications of a heart attack he had suffered from two days earlier.

=== Possible further victims ===
After his arrest, Baldwin was suspected of being responsible for other murders due to his job as a long-haul truck driver. One of these murders was that of 21-year-old Tammy Zywicki, a student at Grinnell College in Iowa who was last seen alive on the I-80 in Illinois when her 1985 white Pontiac T-1000 broke down. While investigating her disappearance, a witness was found that claimed to have seen a girl resembling Zywicki on the side of the road conversing with a truck driver. Her body was found nine days later in rural Missouri. Baldwin was ruled out a few days after his arrest.

Another murder Baldwin was suspected of was the murder of 22-year-old Rhonda Knutson, whose body was found at a truck stop near Williamstown, Iowa, (unincorporated- formerly located south of New Hampton, Iowa) not far from where Baldwin was living at the time. Knutson was beaten to death at her workplace while working the night shift, but was not raped. A colleague later discovered her body, and according to him, the perpetrators were two truck drivers who were last seen entering the store. Facial composites were made of the two men, one of whom closely resembled Clark Perry Baldwin. However, he denied responsibility for the murder of Knutson until his death.

After his arrest in 2020, Baldwin's ex-wife told police that he had repeatedly mentioned that he had apparently strangled a girl in one of the western states sometime in the 1990s, and that he had disposed of her body along an interstate highway.

== See also ==
- List of serial killers in the United States
