= Murder of Tammy Zywicki =

1992 murder in U.S.

Tammy Jo Zywicki
- Born: March 13, 1971; Pleasant Hill, Pennsylvania, U.S.
- Disappeared: Mile marker 83 on Interstate 80 in Illinois
- Died: August 23–24, 1992 (aged 21)
- Cause of death: Homicide by stabbing
- Body discovered: Off Interstate 44 in Missouri between Springfield and Joplin
- Relatives: Todd Zywicki (brother)

Tammy Jo Zywicki (March 13, 1971 – August 23 or 24, 1992) was an American female murder victim from Marlton, New Jersey. Zywicki was driving back to Grinnell College for the start of her fall term when her vehicle, a white 1985 Pontiac T1000 with New Jersey license plates, broke down in Central Illinois. Zywicki was last seen standing over her stopped car on August 23. She was found dead in Southwestern Missouri on September 1.

== Life ==
Tammy Jo Zywicki was born in Pleasant Hill, Pennsylvania, in Lebanon County on March 13, 1971. Zywicki was one of 4 children of JoAnn and Hank Zywicki, with two older brothers and one younger brother. Zywicki grew up in Greenville, South Carolina, but at the time of her murder she was living in Marlton, New Jersey when not at college, where her parents had relocated after Tammy's high school graduation. In New Jersey, Zywicki held a summer job working at a location of Blockbuster. Zywicki graduated from Eastside High School in Greenville in 1989. Zywicki was described as athletic, upbeat, and energetic, with an interest in photography and playing soccer.

Zywicki attended Grinnell College as a double major in art history and Spanish. She spent her spring semester her junior year in Spain. She worked on the college's yearbook as a photographer.

The 2023 Eastside High School yearbook was dedicated to Zywicki, with a featured dedication page as well as a full page feature story about her contributions to the school along with samples of her photography. The story highlighted her talents and contributions to the school along with memories, saying "Tammy had the heart and view of an artist, which led her to being part of the 1988 and 1989 Aurea Aquila Yearbook staff as a photographer. She was a very gifted photographer, and was always able to capture the beauty of each shot she took (whether it was students working on deadlines for the school paper or taking a picture with her cat Zorro). Each of Tammy's photos told a story. Her passion in photography led her to dreaming of pursuing a career as a sports photographer and being accepted into the School of the Art Institute of Chicago. Tammy said during an interview 'I think the best thing about taking pictures was getting to see the negatives turn into pictures'. Tammy was the sort of person who was friendly to everyone. She was an upbeat beam of sunshine who was taken too soon. This page and this book are dedicated to her and her family."

== Death and discovery ==
On August 23, Zywicki left from Evanston, Illinois, (north of Chicago) after dropping her brother off at college there. Tammy Zywicki was headed for Grinnell College in Grinnell, Iowa, where she was due to complete her senior year. Tammy was going to college early with the intention to use the rest of her free time to take pictures of school athletes to feature in the yearbook. It was expected that Tammy would call her mother to check in upon her arrival at Grinnell. The car had been experiencing malfunctions throughout the trip but broke down after Tammy dropped off her brother, near North Utica, Illinois.

Zywicki had been last seen with her car at mile marker 83 on Interstate 80 in Central Illinois between 3:10 and 4pm on August 23. According to witnesses, a tractor-trailer truck was observed right next to the Zywicki Pontiac at these very times, described by witnesses as having a faded, rusty orange stripe around the center. The semi's driver was a Caucasian male between age 35–40 who was either at or just over six feet tall. The semi's driver, according to witnesses, had dark and bushy hair.

But later that day, Zywicki's 1985 Pontiac was discovered by an Illinois State Trooper and ticketed for abandonment; furthermore, the vehicle was towed by Illinois State Police the following day. Later that Monday evening, Tammy's mother, JoAnn Zywicki, informed the Illinois State Police, warning them her daughter hadn't arrived at the intended college. Zywicki's disappearance was not seriously investigated until several days after her mother initially reported her as missing. Originally, police suspected she had run off with a boyfriend, though there was no indication of Zywicki having a boyfriend at the time.

=== Discovery of the body ===
On September 1, 1992, Zywicki was found dead on the side of a rural stretch of Interstate Highway 44 in Lawrence County in southwestern Missouri between Springfield and Joplin. Zywicki was found in the same clothes she had last been seen in, and the identification was confirmed through dental records. The trucker who discovered Zywicki gave law enforcement two different stories for why he pulled over. One story was that he pulled over to urinate, and the other was that he pulled over to cover the bed with a tarp in preparation for rain. The trucker then reported smelling an unusual odor, and spotting a large bundle on the side of the road.

Zywicki's body was found wrapped in a red blanket sealed with duct tape, and she had been stabbed seven or eight times before she died. The medical examiner who examined Zywicki's body noted the strange dispersion of the stab wounds, clustered in a circle around Zywicki's heart. The stabbing had been performed with a small but sharp object, causing Zywicki to die of internal bleeding. According to Federal Bureau of Investigation and Illinois State Police, Zywicki had also been sexually assaulted. When Zywicki's body was found, some of her personal items were gone, including a St. Giles Soccer Club patch from Greenville, South Carolina, a Canon 35mm camera and a musical wrist watch. The watch is Lorus brand, with a green umbrella on its face and a green band. The watch plays the tune "Raindrops Keep Falling On My Head."

== Initial investigation ==
A flier was circulated by the FBI shortly after Zywicki's discovery, featuring information about Zywicki and the truck driver who was last seen with her. Several suspects were identified in relation to Tammy's case by law enforcement, but no arrests have ever been made in her case. In one case, a trucker named Lonnie Bierbrodt was questioned in the months following Zywicki's murder and had hair and fingerprints taken, but was released after no evidence tying him to the crime was found. This suspect died in 2002. Bierbrodt reportedly gave his wife a watch resembling Zywicki's distinctive watch, but the watch was never recovered.

== Cold case ==
Two armchair sleuths with no previous connection to Zywicki started a Facebook page called "Who Killed Tammy Zywicki". Zywicki's mother is in periodic contact with the administrators of the page.

In 2015, Illinois law enforcement announced that they had opened consultation with the Vidocq Society in Philadelphia. Zywicki's mother spoke publicly about finding reassurance in this move. An online petition was put together that same year by friends of Zywicki, requesting law enforcement to release more details from the investigation, in the hopes of generating new leads.

In 2019, citizens of Greenville, where Zywicki spent most of her childhood, in tandem with the Who Killed Tammy Zywicki Facebook page, organized an annual motorcycle ride known as the "Tammy Ride", which takes place on September 3.

Following his arrest in 2020, serial killer Clark Perry Baldwin, a trucker who killed at least three women, was briefly suspected in Zywicki's case, after a retired investigator on Zywicki's case reported to the La Salle News Tribune shortly after Baldwin's arrest, saying that Zywicki's killing fit the profile of Baldwin's previous murders. However, Illinois state police reported soon after that Baldwin was no longer a suspect. Law enforcement did not elaborate why Baldwin was removed from suspicion, but reaffirmed that the case would remain open. Additionally, multiple items of evidence from the case are being examined for DNA evidence.

Zywicki's case is still featured on the FBI's website, and a $50,000 reward is open for information that leads to the arrest of her killer. As of May 2023, Zywicki's murder has not been solved, nor have any prime suspects been arrested in the case. Throughout the years, JoAnn Zywicki has continued to speak to the press, along with other efforts to keep Tammy's case in the public consciousness. Hank Zywicki died in 2015.
