= Gary Libecap =

American economist (born 1946)

Gary D. Libecap
- Born: 1946 (age 79–80); Montana, United States
- Education: University of Montana (BA); University of Pennsylvania (MA, PhD)
- Scientific career
- Fields: Economics; Environmental economics Economic history Property rights
- Workplaces: University of California, Santa Barbara; NBER; Property and Environment Research Center
- Doctoral advisor: Oliver Williamson; Richard Easterlin
- Other academic advisors: Joseph D. Reid; Douglass C. North

Gary Don Libecap (born 1946) is an American economist who is currently an emeritus professor in the Department of Economics and the Bren School at the University of California, Santa Barbara. Libecap's specialty is environmental economics, and his research focuses on the role of property rights institutions in addressing the open access losses for natural resources such as fisheries and freshwater, as well as the role of water markets in encouraging efficient use and allocation. He has authored or co-authored over 200 peer-reviewed papers, lectured widely, and written articles that have appeared in the New York Times and the Wall Street Journal.

Born in 1946, Libecap received a BA in economics from the University of Montana in 1968, and a PhD in economics from the University of Pennsylvania in 1976; he also served in the U.S. Air Force from 1969 to 1973. He held positions at the University of New Mexico, Texas A&M University, and the University of Arizona, before joining the University of California, Santa Barbara, where he was eventually made a Distinguished Professor, and later a professor emeritus.

Libecap is a research associate at the NBER, and was a fellow at the Hoover Institution from 2005 to 2020. He is also a senior fellow at the Property and Environment Research Center in Bozeman, Montana. He served as President of the Western Economic Association International in 2005;President of the Economic History Association in 2006; and President of the International Society for the New Institutional Economics—Society for Institutional and Organizational Economics, 2005. Between 2010 and 2011, he served as the Pitt Professor of American History and Institutions at the University of Cambridge and 2019 Erskine Professor, University of Canterbury, New Zealand. He served on the editorial board of the Journal of Economic Behaviour & Organisation, and formerly was editor of the Journal of Economic History and on the editorial board of Explorations in Economic History.

== Appointed Positions ==
- Member, Global Think Tank on Wild Ocean Fisheries Management, World Wildlife Fund, 2015–2017.
- Advisory Committee: Ostrom Workshop, Indiana University, 2015–2017.
- Advisory Group: Water in the West, Stanford Woods Institute and Bill Lane Center, Stanford University, 2015–2017.
- Fellow, the Economics and Science Group, Australian National University, 2015–2017.
- Advisor Committee, UC Institute on Global Conflict and Cooperation, IGCC, 2013–16
- Member, Scientific Committee, International Center for Economic Research, Turin Italy, 2007–2014
- Member, Advisory Committee on Environmental Research and Education, National Science Foundation, 2005–08
- Member of various NSF research review panels.
- Board of Advisors, Ronald Coase Institute, 2000-

== Books ==
- Contracting for Property Rights. New York: Cambridge University Press, 1989.
- (ed. with Claudia Goldin) The Political Economy of Regulation: An Historical Analysis of Government and the Economy. University of Chicago Press and NBER, 1994.
- (with Ronald Johnson) The Federal Civil Service System and the Problem of Bureaucracy: The Economics and Politics of Institutional Change. University of Chicago Press and NBER, 1994.
- (with Lee Alston and Bernardo Mueller) Titles, Conflict and Land Use: The Development of Property Rights and Land Reform on the Brazilian Amazon Frontier. University of Michigan Press, 1999.
- (ed. with Price V. Fishback and Edward Zajac) Public Choice Essays in Honor of a Maverick Scholar: Gordon Tullock. Kluwer Academic, 2000.
- Owens Valley Revisited: A Reassessment of the West’s First Great Water Transfer. Stanford University Press, 2007.
- (ed. with Richard Steckel) The Economics of Climate Change: Adaptations Past and Present. University of Chicago Press and NBER. May, 2011.
- (with Terry L. Anderson) Environmental Markets: A Property Rights Approach. Cambridge University Press, 2014.
- (with Robert Glennon and Peter W. Culp) Shopping for Water: How the Market Can Mitigate Water Shortages in the American West. Washington DC: Island Press.
- ed. Ariel Dinar, American Agriculture, Water Resources, and Climate Change. Chicago: University of Chicago Press and NBER, 2023.
- Where's Coase? The Implications of Economic Property Rights or Rent-Seeking in Forming Institutions. Cambridge University Press. Forthcoming 2025

== Selected publications ==
- (with R. N. Johnson) "Contracting Problems and Regulation: The Case of the Fishery", American Economic Review, December, 1982.
- (with S. N. Wiggins) "Contractual Responses to the Common Pool: Prorationing of Crude Oil Production", American Economic Review, March, 1984.
- (with S. N. Wiggins) "Oil Field Unitization: Contractual Failure in the Presence of Imperfect Information", American Economic Review, June, 1985.
- (with S. N. Wiggins) "The Influence of Private Contractual Failure on Regulation: The Case of Oil Field Unitization", Journal of Political Economy, August, 1985.
- (with R. N. Johnson) "Bureaucratic Rules, Supervisor Behavior, and the Effect on Salaries in the Federal Government", Journal of Law, Economics, and Organization, March, 1989.]
- (with R. N. Johnson) "Public Sector Employee Voter Participation and Salaries", Public Choice, January, 1991.]
- (with R. N. Johnson) "Patronage to Merit and Control of the Federal Government Labor Force", Explorations in Economic History, January, 1994.
- (with R. N. Johnson) "Courts, A Protected Bureaucracy, and Reinventing Government", Arizona Law Review, Fall, 1995.]
- (with Lee Alston and Robert Schneider) “The Determinants and Impact of Property Rights: Land Titles on the Brazilian Frontier”, Journal of Law, Economics and Organization, April, 1996.
- “Common Property,” in Peter Newman, ed., The New Palgrave Dictionary of Economics and the Law, 1998.
- “Unitization,” in Peter Newman, ed., The New Palgrave Dictionary of Economics and the Law 1998.
- (with James Smith) “The Self-Enforcing Provisions of Oil and Gas Unit Operating Agreements: Theory and Evidence”, Journal of Law, Economics and Organization, July, 1999.
- (with Ronald Johnson) “Transactions Costs and Coalition Stability under Majority Rule”, Economic Inquiry, lead article, April, 2003.
- (with Zeynep Hansen) “Small Farms, Externalities, and the Dust Bowl of the 1930s”, Journal of Political Economy, June, 2004.
- “The Assignment of Property Rights on the Western Frontier: Lessons for Contemporary Environmental and Resource Policy”, Journal of Economic History. June, 2007.]
- (with Jedidiah Brewer, Robert Glennon, and Alan Ker) “Water Markets in the West: Prices, Trading, and Contractual Forms”, Economic Inquiry, April, 2008.]
- “Chinatown Revisited: Owens Valley and Los Angeles—Bargaining Costs and Fairness Perceptions of the First Major Water Rights Exchange”, Journal of Law, Economics and Organization, October, 2009.
- “Open-Access Losses and Delay in the Assignment of Property Rights”, Arizona Law Review, 2008.
- (with Terry Anderson and Ragnar Arnason) “Efficiency Advantages of Grandfathering in Rights-Based Fisheries Management”, Annual Review of Resource Economics, October, 2011.
- “Institutional Path Dependence in Adaptation to Climate: Coman’s “Some Unsettled Problems of Irrigation”, American Economic Review, February, 2011.
- (with Dean Lueck) “The Demarcation of Land and the Role of Coordinating Institutions”, Journal of Political Economy, June, 2011.
- (with Dean Lueck and Trevor O’Grady) "Large Scale Institutional Changes: Land Demarcation within the British Empire", Journal of Law and Economics, November, 2011.
- “Addressing Global Environmental Externalities: Transaction Costs Considerations”, Journal of Economic Literature, June, 2014.
- with Eric Edwards and Martin Fiszbein, “Property Rights to Land and Agricultural Organization: A United States and Argentina Comparison”. “Journal of Law and Economics” 65, February 2022.
- “Where’s Coase? Transaction Costs Reduction or Rent-Seeking in the Formation of Institutions.” International Review of Law and Economics, Special Issue in Honor of Oliver Williamson. 2025.
