= Richard L. Stroup =

American economist (1943–2021)

Richard Lyndell Stroup (1943–2021) was a free-market environmentalist and emeritus professor of economics at both North Carolina State University and Montana State University. He was co-founder of the Property and Environment Research Center (PERC) and a senior fellow. He was also a research fellow at the Independent Institute, adjunct scholar of the Cato Institute, and a member of the Mont Pèlerin Society. At Montana State University, he served as head of the Department of Agricultural Economics & Economics from 2003 to 2006. Stroup was director of the Office of Policy Analysis in the U.S. Department of the Interior from 1982 to 1984.

He was coauthor with James Gwartney and others of Economics: Public and Private Choice, an economics principles textbook now in its 17th edition. This textbook introduced public choice economics to a broad student audience. Public choice is the application of economic principles to governmental decision-making.

Among other writing, he contributed to Re-Thinking Green, edited Cutting Green Tape and was the author of Eco-Nomics: What Everyone Should Know about Economics and the Environment, which received the 2004 Sir Anthony Fisher Memorial Award. He was a coauthor of Common Sense Economics: What Everyone Should Know about Wealth and Prosperity.

Stroup contributed to the development of free market environmentalism and its academic forerunner, the New Resource Economics. He started with an article jointly written with John Baden, "Externality, Property Rights, and Management of National Forests" in the October 1973 issue of the Journal of Law and Economics. The article criticized the U. S. Forest Service's management of national forests and explored the possibility of private ownership of forests (including ownership by environmental groups).

Stroup received a Ph.D. in economics from the University of Washington, where he also received his bachelor's and master's degrees. He was married to Jane Shaw Stroup (Jane S. Shaw), chairperson of the James G. Martin Center for Academic Renewal (previously the John W. Pope Center for Higher Education Policy).

== Publications ==
- Gwartney, James D., Richard L. Stroup, Russell S. Sobel, and David A. McPherson. Economics: Private and Public Choice, 17th ed. Boston, MA: Cengage, 2022.
- Stroup, Richard L. Eco-Nomics: What Everyone Should Know About Economics and the Environment. Washington, DC: Cato Institute, 2003 and 2016. Received the Sir Antony Fisher International Memorial Award in 2004.
- Gwartney, James D., Richard L. Stroup, Dwight R. Lee, Tawni H. Ferrarini, and Joseph P. Calhoun, Common Sense Economics: What Everyone Should Know about Wealth and Prosperity. New York: St. Martin's Press, 2005, 2010, 2016.
- Stroup, Richard L. (2008). "Free-Market Environmentalism". In David R. Henderson (ed.). Concise Encyclopedia of Economics (2nd ed.). Indianapolis: Library of Economics and Liberty. ISBN 978-0865976658. OCLC 237794267.
- Stroup, Richard L. and Roger E. Meiners, contributing eds. Cutting Green Tape: Toxic Pollutants, Environmental Regulation and the Law. Oakland, CA: Independent Institute 1999, New York: Routledge, 2017.
- Stroup, Richard L. "Science and Public Policy," Regulation 27, no. 1 (Spring 2004): 3–4.
- Stroup, Richard L. Review of Out of Bounds, Out of Control by James Delong, in Independent Review, Vol. 8, No. 4 (Spring 2004).
- Stroup, Richard L. "Economic Freedom and Environmental Quality" in Mark A. Wynne, Harvey Rosenblum and Robert L. Formaini, eds., The Legacy of Milton and Rose Friedman's Free to Choose: Economic Liberalism at the Turn of the 21st Century. Dallas: Federal Reserve Bank of Dallas, 2004, pp. 73–92.
- Stroup, Richard L. "Toward a Better Forest Future: Contracting for Critters," in Forest Futures: Science, Politics, and Policy for the Next Century, edited by Karen Arabas and Joe Bowersox Lanham, Md.: Rowman & Littlefield, 2004.
- Stroup, Richard L. and Jane S. Shaw, "Technology and the Protection of Endangered Species," in The Half Life of Policy Rationales: How New Technology Affects Old Policy Issues, edited by Fred E. Foldvary and Daniel B. Klein. New York: New York University Press, 2003. pp. 243–255.
- Stroup, Richard L. "Superfund vs. Environmental Progress: Explaining a Disaster." Institute for Research on the Economics of Taxation, Studies in Social Cost, Regulation, and the Environment, 7. September 2001.
- Stroup, Richard L. "Preserving Wildlife, Usurping Private Property Rights," Environmental Science 6th ed., by Daniel D. Chiras. Sudbury, MA: Jones and Bartlett Publishers, 2001, Section 12-1, 228.
- Morris, Andrew P. and Richard L. Stroup. "Quartering Species: The 'Living Constitution,' the Third Amendment, and the Endangered Species Act," Environmental Law 30 (2000): 769–809.
- Yates, Andrew J., and Richard L. Stroup. "Media Coverage and EPA Pesticide Decisions," Public Choice 102 (2000): 297–312.
- Stroup, Richard L. "Free Riders and Collective Action Revisited," Independent Review IV (4), Spring 2000, pp. 485–500.
- Stroup, Richard L., and Matthew Brown. "Selling Artifacts: The Free Market Can Advance Archaeology If Developers have Control of the Relics They Find," Regulation 23, no. 4 (Winter 2000): 4–6.
- Stroup, Richard L. "Privatizing Public Lands: Market Solutions to Economic and Environmental Problems," Public Land and Resources Law Review 19 (1998): 79–101.
- Stroup, Richard L. "The Endangered Species Act: The Laffer Curve Strikes Again," Journal of Private Enterprise 14, Special Issue (1998): 48–62.
- Stroup, Richard L. "Superfund: The Shortcut that Failed," in Terry L. Anderson, ed., Breaking the Environmental Policy Gridlock, Stanford: Hoover Institution Press, 1997, pp. 115–139.
- Stroup, Richard L. "The Economics of Compensating Property Owners." Contemporary Economic Policy 15 (Oct. 1997): 55–65.
- Stroup, Richard L. "Property Rights, Justice, and Efficient Environmental Policy," Journal des Economistes et des Etudes Humaines 7, no. 2/3 (1996): 211–237 (Published 1997.)
