= Morrison v. National Australia Bank =

- Supreme Court of the United States

Argued March 29, 2010 Decided June 24, 2010
- Full case name: Robert Morrison, et al., Petitioners v. National Australia Bank Ltd., et al.
- Docket no.: 08-1191
- Citations: 561 U.S. 247 (more) 130 S. Ct. 2869; 177 L. Ed. 2d 535; 2010 U.S. LEXIS 5257; 78 U.S.L.W. 4700; Fed. Sec. L. Rep. (CCH) ¶ 95,776; 76 Fed. R. Serv. 3d (Callaghan) 1330; 22 Fla. L. Weekly Fed. S 575

Case history
- Prior: Motion to dismiss granted, In re Nat'l Australia Bank Sec. Litig., No. 03-cv-6537, 2006 WL 3844465 (S.D.N.Y. Oct. 25, 2006); affirmed sub nom. Morrison v. Nat'l Australia Bank Ltd., 547 F.3d 167 (2d Cir. 2008); cert. granted, 558 U.S. 1047 (2009).

Holding
- Section 10(b) of the Securities Exchange Act of 1934 does not provide a cause of action to foreign plaintiffs suing foreign and American defendants for misconduct in connection with securities traded on foreign exchanges.

Court membership
- Chief Justice John Roberts Associate Justices John P. Stevens · Antonin Scalia; Anthony Kennedy · Clarence Thomas; Ruth Bader Ginsburg · Stephen Breyer; Samuel Alito · Sonia Sotomayor

Case opinions
- Majority: Scalia, joined by Roberts, Kennedy, Thomas, Alito
- Concurrence: Breyer (in part)
- Concurrence: Stevens (in judgment), joined by Ginsburg
- Sotomayor took no part in the consideration or decision of the case.

Laws applied
- Securities Exchange Act of 1934 §10(b)
- Superseded by
- Dodd–Frank Wall Street Reform and Consumer Protection Act, Pub. L. No. 111-203, sec. 292P(b)(2), § 27(b), 124 Stat. 1376, 1862 (2010)

Morrison v. National Australia Bank, 561 U.S. 247 (2010), was a United States Supreme Court case concerning the extraterritorial effect of U.S. securities legislation. Morrison extinguished two species of securities class-action claims that had proliferated in preceding years: "foreign-cubed" claims, in which foreign plaintiffs sued foreign issuers for losses on transactions on foreign exchanges, and "foreign-squared" claims, brought by domestic plaintiffs against foreign issuers for losses on transactions on foreign exchanges.

== Background ==
The case concerned the 1998 purchase by National Australia Bank of a mortgage servicing company, HomeSide Lending, headquartered in Florida. In July 2001, NAB announced a US$0.45 billion (equivalent to $0.78 billion in 2025) write-down in assets due to losses associated with HomeSide Lending; and a further $1.75 billion (equivalent to $3.03 billion in 2025) write-down in September of that year. The root cause of the write-down was that the modelling done by HomeSide Lending to determine future revenues from mortgage fees was based on overly optimistic assumptions. The plaintiffs claimed that this was part of an intentional scheme to defraud committed by HomeSide's management. By the time the case reached the US Supreme Court, only Australian investors remained as plaintiffs. A US investor (Morrison, for whom the case was named) participated in earlier proceedings, but his case was thrown out for unrelated reasons.

The plaintiffs argued that the fact the alleged fraud occurred in Florida meant that it should be subject to US securities laws. The defendants argued that, since the alleged fraud related to trading in Australian securities, US securities laws did not apply.

== Opinion of the Court ==
The decision was unanimous for the defendants, with two concurring opinions (and Justice Sotomayor recusing herself, because she had been involved in the case at the Second Circuit). The majority opinion, by Scalia, held that since the plain language of section 10(b) only applies to US securities, it should not be read to apply to non-US securities, despite longstanding precedent, originating in the 2nd Circuit and subsequently adopted by other circuits as well, that §10(b) also applies to non-US securities.

The Court clarified a "longstanding principle of American law 'that legislation of Congress, unless a contrary intent appears, is meant to apply only within the territorial jurisdiction of the United States.'" It noted that "the Second Circuit believed that, because the Exchange Act is silent as to the extraterritorial application of §10(b), it was left to the court to 'discern' whether Congress would have wanted the statute to apply. This disregard of the presumption against extraterritoriality ... has been repeated over many decades by various courts of appeals.... That has produced a collection of tests for divining what Congress would have wanted, complex in formulation and unpredictable in application.... The results ... demonstrate the wisdom of the presumption against extraterritoriality. Rather than guess anew in each case, we apply the presumption in all cases, preserving a stable background against which Congress can legislate with predictable effects."

Stevens filed a partial concurrence, which Ginsburg joined, rejecting the overturning of the existing jurisprudence on section 10(b); at the same time, he held that in this particular case, the defendants should prevail, since both the plaintiffs and defendants were Australian, and the case would be better dealt with by the Australian court system – but unlike the majority, he would apply 10(b) to cases involving non-US securities, where there was a closer connection to the US (e.g. US plaintiffs).

== Aftermath ==
The Dodd–Frank Wall Street Reform and Consumer Protection Act of July 21, 2010, in its section 929P(b), allowed the SEC and DOJ extraterritorial jurisdiction, but this interpretation remains contested in the courts. In its section 929Y, the Act commissioned the SEC to study extending the permission to private actors. The study indicated a number of options for action to be taken by Congress, which in varying degrees would mitigate the decision.

In late 2010, Fabrice Tourre of Goldman Sachs asked for dismissal of an SEC suit against him based on the repercussions of the decision in this case, claiming his deals were outside the US and thus not subject to certain US laws.

== See also ==
- List of United States Supreme Court cases, volume 561
- Dodd–Frank Wall Street Reform and Consumer Protection Act
- Extraterritorial jurisdiction
- US corporate law
