= Terry L. Anderson =

American academic and writer

Terry Lee Anderson is an academic and author primarily focused on the intersection of economic and environmental issues in America. Anderson's works argue that market approaches can be both economically sound and environmentally sensitive. Influenced by the Austrian school of economic thought, his research helped launch the idea of free-market environmentalism and has prompted public debate over the proper role of government in managing natural resources.

Anderson received his B.S. from the University of Montana in 1968 and earned a PhD in economics from the University of Washington in 1972. Following graduation, he began a teaching career at Montana State University which spanned over 25 years, culminating in a professor emeritus position at the university. In 1980, Anderson, along with three colleagues who were also interested in environmental policy (Richard L. Stroup, John Baden and P.J. Hill), co-founded the Property and Environment Research Center (PERC), where he later became executive director and a William A. Dunn Distinguished Senior Fellow. Anderson is also a John and Jean De Nault Senior Fellow at the Hoover Institution, Stanford University.

Anderson is the author or editor of thirty-seven books. Among these, Free Market Environmentalism, co-authored with Donald Leal, received the 1992 Sir Antony Fisher International Memorial Award. Anderson and Donald Leal's most recent book, Free Market Environmentalism – The Next Generation, was published in 2015. His most recent publications are Environmental Markets: a Property Rights Approach and Tapping Water Markets. Other books include Greener Than Thou: Are You Really an Environmentalist? and Property Rights: A Practical Guide to Freedom and Prosperity, both co-authored with Laura Huggins. His book, with Peter J. Hill, The Not So Wild, Wild West: Property Rights on the Frontier, was awarded the 2005 Sir Antony Fisher International Memorial Award.

Anderson's research, which has also focused on Native American economies, recently resulted in a co-edited volume, Self-Determination: The Other Path for Native Americans. He has published widely in the popular press and professional journals, including the Wall Street Journal, the Christian Science Monitor, Fly Fisherman, Journal of Law and Economics, and Economic Inquiry. In March 2011, Anderson received the Liberalni Institute Annual Award in Prague, Czech Republic, for his "Contribution to the Proliferation of Liberal Thinking, and Making Ideas of Liberty, Private Property, Competition, and the Rule of Law Come True."(source?)

Anderson was an expert witness for the State of Montana in the youth climate change lawsuit Held v. Montana. His testimony was rejected by the judge, who wrote that Anderson's data "was not well-supported, contained errors, and was not given weight by the Court."

== Selected works ==
- Terry L. Anderson & Peter J. Hill (eds), The Not So Wild, Wild West: Property Rights on the Frontier, Stanford, California, Stanford Economics and Finance, 2004. ISBN 0804748543.
- Terry L. Anderson & Bruce Yandle (eds), Agriculture and the Environment – Searching for Greener Pastures, Stanford, California, Hoover Institution Press, 2001. ISBN 0817999124.
- Terry L. Anderson and Donald R. Leal, Free Market Environmentalism, New York, NY, Palgrave, 2001. (The original 1991 edition was published by Westview Press). ISBN 031223502X.
- Terry L. Anderson and Henry I. Miller (eds), The Greening of U.S. Foreign Policy, Stanford, California, Hoover Institution Press, 2000. ISBN 0817998624.
- Terry L. Anderson (ed), Political Environmentalism: Going Behind the Green Curtain, Stanford, California, Hoover Institution Press, 2000. ISBN 0817997520.
- Terry L. Anderson and Alexander James (eds), The Politics and Economics of Park Management, Lanham, MD, Rowman and Littlefield Publishers, 2001. ISBN 978-0742511569.
- Terry L. Anderson and Donald R. Leal, Enviro-Capitalists, Doing Good While Doing Well, Lanham, MD, Rowman and Littlefield Publishers, 1997. ISBN 0847683818.
- Terry L. Anderson and Pamela S. Snyder, Water Markets: Priming the Invisible Pump, Washington D.C., Cato, 1997. ISBN 1882577434.
- Terry L. Anderson (ed), Breaking the Environmental Policy Gridlock, Stanford, California, Hoover Institution Press, 1997. ISBN 0817994726.
- Terry L. Anderson and Peter J. Hill (eds), Water Marketing—The Next Generation, Lanham, MD, Rowman and Littlefield Publishers, 1997. ISBN 0847683974.
- Terry L. Anderson and Peter J. Hill (eds), Privatization Process: A Worldwide Perspective, Lanham, MD, Rowman and Littlefield Publishers, 1996. ISBN 0847681866.
- Terry L. Anderson, Sovereign Nations or Reservations? An Economic History of American Indians, San Francisco, Pacific Research Institute for Public Policy, 1995. ISBN 0936488816.
- Terry L. Anderson and Peter J. Hill (eds), Wildlife in the Marketplace Lanham, MD, Rowman and Littlefield Publishers, 1995. ISBN 084768024X.
