= Joseph D. Reid =

American economics professor active 1965–

Joseph D. Reid is an American retired professor of economics with specializations in economic history and development economics. A graduate of the University of Chicago (MBA 1965, MA 1970, PhD 1974), he taught at multiple universities, including his alma mater and George Mason University. Reid has published considerable work in the field American economic history, with emphasis on agricultural and early American history. Two such examples are “Sharecropping and Agricultural Uncertainty” and “Economic Burden: Spark to the American Revolution?”

== Economic Burden: Spark to the American Revolution? ==
“Economic Burden: Spark to the American Revolution?” examines the generally accepted claim that financial burdens on the American colonists in the prerevolutionary era were one of the causal factors that drove the colonists to the overthrow British rule. Reid analyzes this claim by estimating the wealth and income of the colonists and comparing those figures to the tax rate and burdensome trade regulations, such as the Acts of Trade and Navigation. This legislature, among other things, made it necessary that all foreign trade with the colonies go through England.

Reid comes to the conclusion that the net burden on imports were not likely to have been more than two to three percent. Compared with other nations, colonists experienced less of a tax burden than anyone and had a higher standard of living. However, most of the economic burden experienced by the colonies came in the form of lost trade. Additionally, the being under British rule gave the colonialists many benefits, such as military protection from the Native Americans. Ultimately, Reid concludes that “conflicting economic interests sufficed to start the American Revolution.”
