= Jonathan H. Adler =

American legal scholar

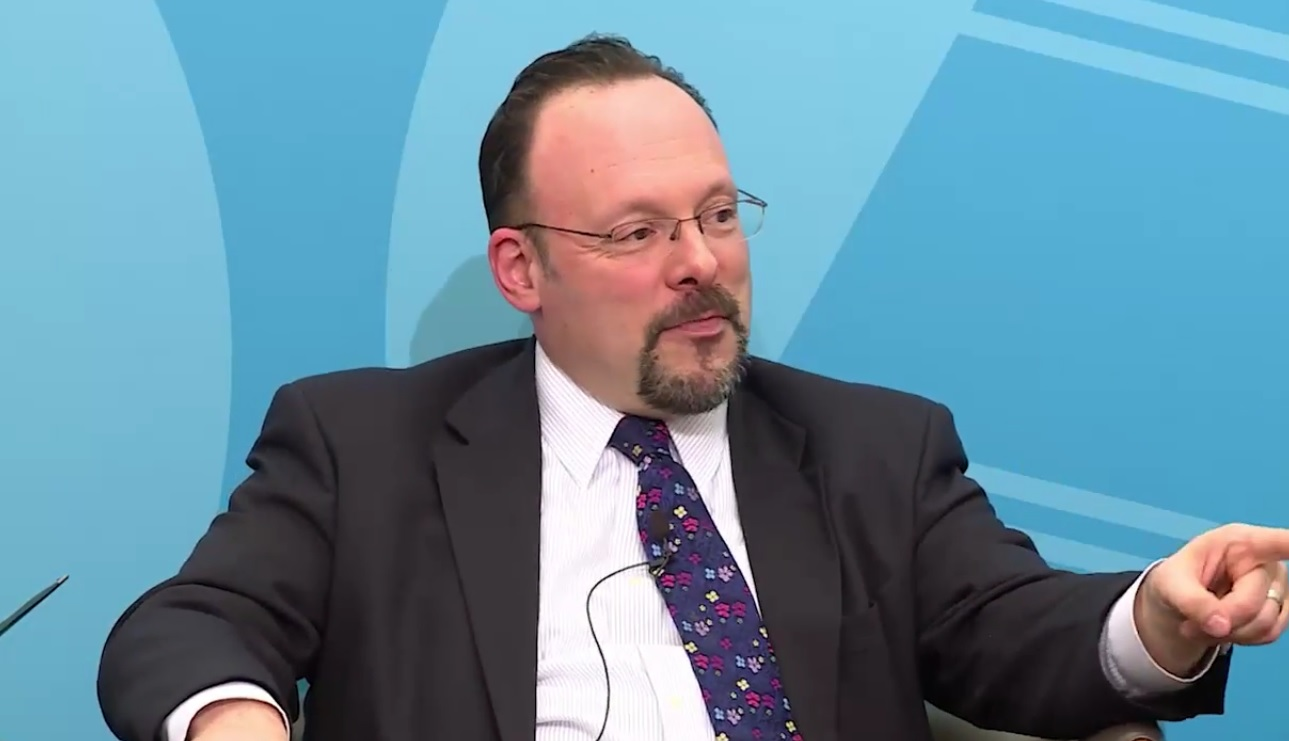
- Adler in 2017
- Born: Philadelphia, Pennsylvania, U.S.

Academic background
- Education: Yale University (BA); George Mason University (JD)

Academic work
- Discipline: Administrative law Constitutional law Environmental law
- Institutions: Competitive Enterprise Institute; William & Mary Law School; Cato Institute

Jonathan H. Adler is a conservative American legal commentator and law professor at William & Mary Law School. His research is also credited with inspiring litigation that challenged the Obama Administration's implementation of the Affordable Care Act, resulting in the Supreme Court's decision in King v. Burwell.

== Early life and education ==
Adler was born in Philadelphia. He graduated from Friends' Central School in Wynnewood, Pennsylvania, then studied history at Yale University, graduating in 1991 with a B.A., magna cum laude. From 1991 to 2000, Adler was a policy analyst at the Competitive Enterprise Institute, a libertarian think tank in Washington, DC. He attended the George Mason University School of Law as an evening student, becoming an editor of the George Mason Law Review. He graduated in 2000 ranked first in his class with a J.D., summa cum laude.

== Career ==
After law school, Adler was a law clerk for Judge David B. Sentelle of the U.S. Court of Appeals for the District of Columbia Circuit from 2000 to 2001. From 1991 to 2000, he worked at the conservative Competitive Enterprise Institute, where he directed the institute's environmental studies program, and worked on environmental policy matters. Although a proponent of "free-market environmentalism," Adler has also endorsed the imposition of a carbon tax and other measures to address the problem of climate change. He is also credited with helping to convince some former climate change deniers to accept the scientific evidence for global warming and the associated threat. Adler is currently one of the most cited law professors in the fields of administrative and environmental law.

Adler supported former Republican Tennessee Senator Fred Thompson in the 2008 presidential election. In 2012, Adler headed a screening committee appointed by Ohio governor John Kasich to assist him in selecting an appointee to fill an open seat on the Ohio Supreme Court. Adler again participated in the selection process to fill an open Ohio Supreme Court seat in 2017. Hs has also served on the Bipartisan Judicial Advisory Commission appointed by Ohio Senators Sherrod Brown and Rob Portman to advise on federal district court nominations.

In 2018, Adler was a founding member of Checks and Balances. As part of Checks and Balances, Adler has joined multiple statements criticizing former President Trump and defending rule of law values.

=== Affordable Care Act litigation ===
Adler's research and writing on the Affordable Care Act is credited with inspiring litigation that led to a U.S. Supreme Court challenge to the lawfulness of tax credits in states that failed to create their own health insurance exchanges. Adler first wrote an article for a 2011 health care symposium in which he argued that the text of the Affordable Care Act did not authorize tax credits in states that refused to set up their own health insurance exchanges. At the time, this did not seem like a significant observation as the Supreme Court had not yet decided NFIB v. Sebelius and it appeared that most states would voluntarily create their own exchanges.

As states started to resist implementing the Affordable Care Act, Adler co-authored several pieces with Michael Cannon of the Cato Institute, arguing that an IRS rule authorizing tax credits in states that did not create their own exchanges would be unlawful. Adler and Cannon's arguments were controversial, and prompted significant academic response. Adler and Cannon's work also prompted several lawsuits challenging the lawfulness of the tax credits, including Halbig v. Sebelius and King v. Burwell.

Adler and Cannon filed amicus briefs defending their research in several of the cases. In the end, however, the U.S. Supreme Court rejected Adler and Cannon's interpretation by a 6–3 vote in King v. Burwell. Adler's scholarship has also been relied upon in other Supreme Court cases, and was cited by Chief Justice Roberts in his City of Arlington v. FCC dissent and by Justice Gorsuch in Kisor v. Wilkie.

=== Case Western University School of Law ===
Before joining the faculty at William & Mary Law School, Adler was tenured professor at Case Western Reserve University School of Law in Cleveland, where he taught courses in environmental, regulatory, and constitutional law. He was the director of the law school's Coleman P. Burke Center for Environmental Regulation. In 2011, Adler was named the inaugural holder of the Johan Verheij Memorial Professorship at CWRU.

Adler is a contributing editor to the conservative National Review Online and a contributor to "The Volokh Conspiracy". He blogged anonymously under the pseudonym "Juan Non-Volokh" at "The Volokh Conspiracy" until May 1, 2006.

Adler serves on the advisory board of the NFIB Legal Foundation, and the Environmental Law Reporter and ELI Press Advisory Board of the Environmental Law Institute.

In 2004, Adler received the Paul M. Bator Award. In 2007, the Case Western Reserve University Law Alumni Association awarded Adler their annual "Distinguished Teacher Award."

== Personal life ==
In 2001, Adler moved to Cleveland, Ohio, where he met his wife, Christina.

== Books ==
- Marijuana Federalism: Uncle Sam and Mary Jane (2020), ISBN 978-0815737896
- Business and the Roberts Court, Editor (2016), ISBN 978-0199859344
- A Conspiracy Against Obamacare: The Volokh Conspiracy and the Health Care Case, co-author (2013), ISBN 978-1137363732
- Rebuilding the Ark: New Perspectives on Endangered Species Act Reform (2011), ISBN 978-0844743912
- Ecology, Liberty & Property: A Free Market Environmental Reader, Editor (2000) ISBN 978-1889865027
- The Costs of Kyoto: Climate Change Policy and Its Implications, Editor (1997), ISBN 978-1889865010
- Environmentalism at the Crossroads: Green Activism in America (1995), ISBN 978-0865875708
