= John Baden =

American political analyst

John A. Baden is founder and chairman of the Foundation for Research on Economics and the Environment (FREE) based in Bozeman, Montana. In addition to FREE. he cofounded the Property and Environment Research Center (PERC), the Environmental Management MBA program at the University of Washington, and Warriors and Quiet Waters. He has taught at Indiana University, Montana State University, Utah State University, and the University of Washington. Baden and his wife, Ramona Marotz-Badem, own a ranch in Gallatin Gateway, outside Bozeman, Montana.

In 1977 Baden co-authored Managing the Commons with Garrett Hardin, the author of the essay "The Tragedy of the Commons". The book, which is currently out of print, is a collection of articles exploring the themes raised in Hardin's original essay.

== Bibliography ==
Table of Contents of Managing the Commons, by Garrett Hardin and John Baden (editors)

1. What Marx Missed, Garrett Hardin
2. On the Checks to Population, William Forster Lloyd
3. The Tragedy of the Commons, Garrett Hardin
4. Intuition First, Then Rigor, Garrett Hardin
5. An Algebraic Theory of the Commons, H.V. Muhsam
6. A Model of the Commons, Jay M. Anderson
7. Denial and Disguise, Garrett Hardin
8. The Tragedy of the Commons Revisited, Beryl L. Crowe
9. An Operational Analysis of "Responsibility", Garrett Hardin
10. Killing the Goose, Daniel Fife
11. The Economics of Overexploitation, Colin W. Clark
12. A Test of the Tragedy of the Commons, James A. Wilson
13. Ethical Implications of Carrying Capacity, Garrett Hardin
14. Rewards of Pejoristic Thinking, Garrett Hardin
15. A Primer for the Management of Common Pool Resources, John Baden
16. The Social Costs of Reducing Social Cost, Gordon Tullock
17. A Theory for Institutional Analysis of Common Pool Problems, Vincent Ostrom and Elinor Ostrom
18. Collective Action and the Tragedy of the Commons, Elinor Ostrom
19. Communes and the Logic of the Commons, Kari Bullock and John Baden
20. From Free Grass to Fences: Transforming the Commons of the American West, Terry L. Anderson and P. J. Hill
21. Environmental Resource Management: Public or Private? Robert L. Bish
22. Property Rights, Environmental Quality, and the Management of National Forests, John Baden and Richard Stroup
23. Neospartan Hedonists, Adult Toy Aficionados, and the Rationing of Public Lands, John Baden
24. Population, Ethnicity, and Public Goods: The Logic of Interest-Group Strategy, John Baden
25. Living on a Lifeboat, Garrett Hardin
26. Commons and Community: The Idea of a Public, Kenneth E. Boulding
