= Bruce Yandle =

American economist

- Born: Bruce Yandle; August 12, 1933 (age 91)

Academic background
- Education: Mercer University (BA); Georgia State University (MBA, PhD)

Academic work
- Discipline: Economics
- School or tradition: Public choice
- Institutions: Federal Trade Commission; Clemson University; Mercatus Center
- Notable ideas: Bootleggers and Baptists

Bruce Yandle (born August 12, 1933) is Dean Emeritus of Clemson University's College of Business and Behavioral Science and Alumni Distinguished Professor of Economics Emeritus at Clemson. He is a Distinguished Adjunct Professor of Economics at the Mercatus Center, a faculty member with George Mason University's Capitol Hill Campus, and a Senior Fellow with the Property and Environment Research Center (PERC). He has served as executive director of the Federal Trade Commission in Washington, D.C., and served as senior economist on the President's Council on Wage and Price Stability from 1976 to 1978.

== Biography ==
Yandle received his bachelor's degree from Mercer University and his MBA and PhD from Georgia State University. His main research interests are public choice, regulation, and free-market environmentalism. He has been president of the Association of Private Enterprise Education, member and chairman of the South Carolina State Board of Economic Advisors, and member and chairman of the Spartanburg Methodist College board of trustees. He produces a quarterly newsletter on the economy distributed by George Mason University's Mercatus Center.

He was the first to put forth the story of the bootlegger and the Baptist, which describes how economic and ethical interests ally with one another to promote regulation, even though the two groups would never agree or collaborate otherwise.

Prior to starting his career in academia, he had a fifteen-year career in the industrial machinery business. He lives with his wife in Clemson, South Carolina.

== Publications ==
- Bootleggers and Baptists: How Economic Forces and Moral Persuasion Interact to Shape Regulatory Politics ISBN 978-1939709363
- Taking the Environment Seriously ISBN 978-0847680542
- The Political Limits of Environmental Regulation: Tracking the Unicorn ISBN 978-0899304311
- Land Rights ISBN 978-0847680290
- Common Law and Common Sense for the Environment ISBN 978-0847686735
- Regulation by Litigation ISBN 978-0300120028
